= Bimbhaktra Bhani Svastivatana =

- Princess of Siam
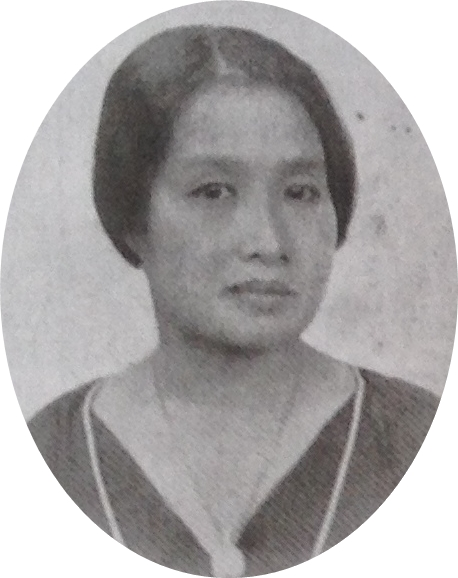
- Born: December 22, 1892; Bangkok, Siam
- Died: August 22, 1934 (aged 41); Bangkok, Siam
- English: Her Serene Highness Princess Bimbhaktra Bhani Svastivatana; Thai: หม่อมเจ้าพิมพักตร์ภาณี สวัสดิวัตน์
- House: Svastivatana family (Chakri Dynasty)
- Father: Prince Svasti Sobhana, the Prince of Svastivatana Visishtha
- Mother: Mom Lamul ( Pisolyabut )

Princess Bimbhaktra Bhani Svastivatana (Thai: พิมพักตร์ภาณี; RTGS: Pimphakphani; complete title: Her Serene Highness Princess (Mom Chao) Bimbhaktra Bhani Svastivatana, Thai: หม่อมเจ้าพิมพักตร์ภาณี สวัสดิวัตน์; 22 December 1855 – 22 August 1934) was a Princess of Siam, a member of Siamese royal family and a member House of Svastivatana, a royal house which was originated by her father and descends from Chakri Dynasty and half-sister of Queen Rambhai Barni.

Princess Bimbhaktra Bhani Svastivatana was daughter of Prince Svasti Sobhana, the Prince of Svastivatana Visishtha and Mom Lamul ( Pisolyabut ) Svastivatana na Ayudhaya. She had 2 sisters and 1 younger brother.

1. Princess Dhasani Nonglaksana Svastivatana
2. Princess Bimbhaktra Bhani Svastivatana
3. Prince Chalermsrisvastivatana Svastivatana
4. Princess Nonglaksana Dhasani Svastivatana
