= Dhasani Nonglaksana Svastivatana =

- Princess of Siam
- Born: March 26, 1889; Bangkok, Siam
- Died: May 28, 1901 (aged 12); Bangkok, Siam
Names
- English: Her Serene Highness Princess Dhasani Nonglaksana Svastivatana; Thai: หม่อมเจ้าทัศนีนงลักษณ์ สวัสดิวัตน์
- House: Svastivatana family (Chakri Dynasty)
- Father: Prince Svasti Sobhana, the Prince Svastivatana Visishtha
- Mother: Mom Lamul ( Pisolyabut )

Princess Dhasani Nonglaksana (Thai: ทัศนีนงลักษณ์; RTGS: Thatsani Nonglak complete title: Her Serene Highness Princess (Mom Chao) Dhasani Nonglaksana Thai: หม่อมเจ้าทัศนีนงลักษณ์ สวัสดิวัตน์; RTGS: Thatsani Nonglak Sawatdiwat) is a Princess of Siam, a member of Siamese royal family, and a member House of Svastivatana, a royal house which originated by Her father and descends from Chakri Dynasty and half-sister of Queen Rambhai Barni of Siam.
