= Nonglaksana Dhasani Svastivatana =

- Princess of Siam
- Born: 5 April 1900; Bangkok, Siam
- Died: 31 March 1940 (aged 39); Bangkok, Siam
- Burial: Wat Makut Kasattriyaram
- Spouse: Prince Laichaluthong Thongyai
- House: Svastivatana family (Chakri Dynasty)
- Father: Prince Svasti Sobhana, the Prince Svastivatana Visishtha
- Mother: Mom Lamul ( Pisolyabut )

Princess Nonglaksana Dhasani Thai: นงลักษณ์ทัศนี; RTGS: Nonglak Thatsani complete title: Her Serene Highness Princess (Mom Chao) Nonglaksana Dhasani Svastivatana Thai: หม่อมเจ้านงลักษณ์ทัศนี สวัสดิวัตน์; RTGS: Nonglak Thatsani Sawatdiwat) (5 April 1900 – 31 March 1940) was a Princess of Siam, a member of the Siamese royal family and a member of the House of Svastivatana, a royal house which was originated by her father and descends from the Chakri Dynasty. She was a half-sister of Queen Rambhai Barni of Siam.

== Early life and family ==
Princess Nonglaksana Dhasani was born on 5 April 1900 in Bangkok, Siam, as the daughter of Prince Svasti Sobhana, the Prince Svastivatana Visishtha and Mom Lamul (Pisolyabut). Her father, Prince Svasti Sobhana, was a son of King Mongkut (Rama IV) and founded the House of Svastivatana, making Princess Nonglaksana Dhasani a granddaughter of King Mongkut.

As a member of the extensive Svastivatana family, she was one of 48 children (22 sons and 26 daughters) born to Prince Svasti Sobhana from his ten wives and consorts. The House of Svastivatana became one of the prominent royal houses in Siam, with several members holding important positions in the government and military.

== Death and legacy ==
Princess Nonglaksana Dhasani died on 31 March 1940 in Bangkok at the age of 39. Her death was marked by a royal cremation ceremony held at Wat Makut Kasattriyaram, reflecting her status as a member of the royal family. A commemorative book titled "ไม่ศูนย์, แต่ไปก่อน" (Not Zero, But Gone Before) was published for her cremation ceremony, which is now preserved in the Thammasat University Digital Collections.

As a member of the House of Svastivatana, Princess Nonglaksana Dhasani was part of the generation that witnessed significant changes in Siam, including the transition from absolute monarchy to constitutional monarchy in 1932. Her family connections, particularly her relationship to Queen Rambhai Barni, placed her within the inner circle of the royal family during a transformative period in Thai history.
