= Aristide J. G. Papineau =

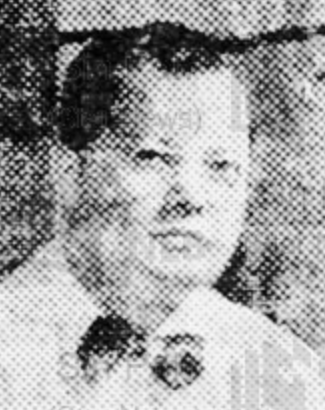
Papineau in 1950

Aristide Joseph Gustav Papineau (28 September 1915 – 1998) was the founder and director of a prominent advertising agency in Singapore and a guidebook writer.

== Early life and education ==
Papineau was born in Singapore on 28 September 1915 to a French father and an Egypt-born Italian of both German and Italian descent. His father, a seaman, died shortly after the end of World War I and his mother died of Typhoid in 1924, after which he and his siblings began living with their grandmother. Papineau studied at the St. Joseph's Institution, graduating from the school in 1931.

== Career ==
Papineau began working at the General Electric Company as a junior clerk. He remained in this position before he became an assistant manager at the Radio Department at the start of World War II. Following the end of the Japanese Occupation of Singapore, Papineau established Papineau Studios, an advertising agency, in 1946. He claimed to have done so as he "found promotion as a monthly paid employee too slow". He served as the head of the firm, which was also a publisher. The firm published the Papineau's Guide to Singapore series and the Proceedings of the Alumni Association of the King Edward VII College of Medicine, a medical journal. The "rapidly expanding" business moved into new premises on Orchard Road at the end of 1950. The Singapore Standard stated that the Guide to Singapore was "by far the most attractive guide to the city yet produced by a local publisher and printer. The guide was updated with a new edition annually. A review of the 1955 edition of the guide in The Straits Times stated: "Residents and tourists alike will find in this handy book most things they may want to know about Singapore.

In June 1955, the company relocated to larger premises in the newly completed Clemenceau House. By then, the firm, which had 20 employees, had become "one of the biggest advertising concerns in Malaya." It handled a "substantial portion" of advertising copy in the English, Chinese, Tamil and Malay language newspapers in the region. In 1962, the firm began publishing Guide to Kuala Lumpur, which was also edited by Papineau. A reviewer from The Straits Times wrote: "Although comprehensive it is handy." At some point, he split off the publishing section of his company into its own firm, named Andre Publications. By 1963, his firm had been renamed Papineau Advertising Ltd. At the 1963 Annual Advertising Awards, organised by the Creative Circle Singapore, advertisements produced by the firm won first place in the Black and White Photography category, first place in the Brochures category and second place in the Packaging category. According to the organisation, the growth of Papineau Advertising Ltd., which was "ranked among the leading agencies in Malaysia and is one of the few locally-owned advertising agencies", could be attributed to the "success of clients whose businesses have expanded during the time the Agency has been operating for them", as well as to "recommendation." The agency won first place in the Packaging category in the 1966 Advertising Awards.

In May 1968, it was announced that the advertising agency was being voluntarily wound up. However, Papineau continued to operate Andre Publications, under which he began publishing Papineau's Guide to ASEAN and Papineau's Guide to Hong Kong. Guides were also produced for Bangkok, Malaysia, Jakarta, Bali, the Philippines and Sri Lanka. In 1979, it was announced that Jack Chia-MPH would be acquiring the publication rights for the guidebook series on 1 April.

== Personal life ==
Papineau married Rose Caulfield James, the daughter of Joseph Caulfield James, at the Cathedral of the Good Shepherd on 16 December 1941. They had two sons. After selling the publication rights to his guidebook series, Papineau and his wife retired to Perth, Australia, residing in the suburb of Ardross. He died there in 1998.
