= Kannikakaew =

- Princess Khattiyakanlaya
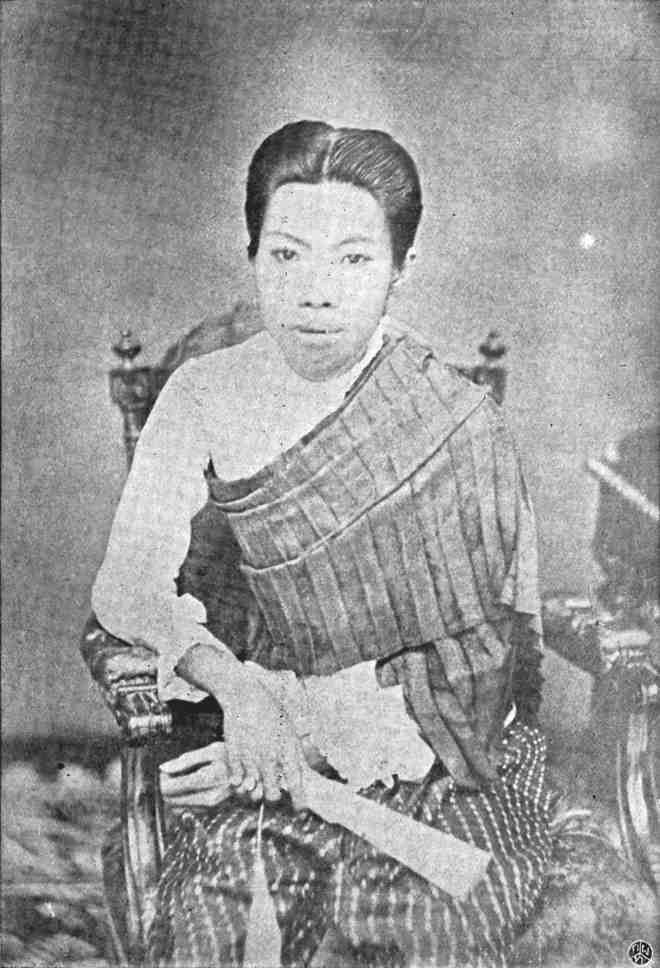
- Born: 10 December 1855; Bangkok, Siam
- Died: 13 May 1882 (aged 26); Bangkok, Siam
- House: Chakri Dynasty
- Father: Mongkut (Rama IV)
- Mother: Phannarai

Princess Kannikakaew, the Princess Khattiyakanlaya (Thai: กรรณิกาแก้ว; RTGS: Kannika Kaeo; 10 December 1855 – 13 May 1882) was the Princess of Siam (later Thailand). She was a member of Siamese royal family and was a daughter of King Mongkut and Princess Phannarai. She was a half-sister (different mother) of King Chulalongkorn and had one younger brother, Prince Narisara Nuvadtivongs.
