= Abha Barni =

- Princess of Siam
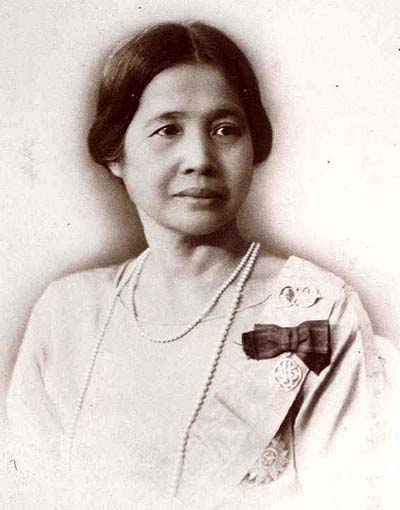
- Princess Abha Barni c. 1930s
- Born: March 28, 1874; Bangkok, Thailand
- Died: August 6, 1938 (aged 64); Bangkok, Thailand
- Spouse: Prince Svasti Sobhana, the Prince of Svastivatana Visishtha
- Issue: Prince Seri Savatdikamol Svastivatana; Prince Sobhana Bharadaya Svastivatana; Princess Rambai Barni Svastivatana; Prince Mai Svastivatana; Prince Daeng Svastivatana; Prince Nandiyavat Svastivatana; Prince Orachun Chitsanu Svastivatana; Prince Yuditya Sathian Svastivatana
- House: Chakri Dynasty
- Father: Gagananga Yukala, The Prince Bijitprijakara
- Mother: Mom Sun Gagananga Na Ayutthaya

Princess Abha Barni (Note: Thai: อาภาพรรณี; RTGS: Aphaphanni, formerly Princess Abha Barni Gagananga Thai: อาภาพรรณี คัคณางค์; RTGS: Aphaphanni Khakkanang) (28 March 1874 - 6 August 1938) was a wife of Prince Svasti Sobhana and became Princess Abha Barni Svastivatana. She is the daughter of Rambai Barni, the queen of Thailand and wife of her son-in-law Prajadhipok.

== Biography ==
Princess Abha Barni Gagananga was born on 28 March 1876, to Gagananga Yukala, Prince Bijitprijakara (a son of King Mongkut and consort Phueng) and Mom Sun Gagananga Na Ayutthaya. She had 5 siblings younger sister and younger brother. Princess Klang Gagananga, Princess Chavi Vilaya Gagananga, Prince Noi Ganganang, Prince Klang Gagananga, and Prince Pridiyakara Gagananga

She was known for her beauty. Chulalongkorn once said jokingly when he had a daughter in 1877 named Suddha Dibyaratana, with Sukhumala Marasri that "ฉันไม่แพ้เธอแล้ว" meaning that he doesn't lose beauty with her anymore.

In 1929, Prajadhipok appointed Abha Barni to the rank of Her Royal Highness, as she was the mother of Rambai Barni. However, following the Siamese revolution of 1932 led by Khana Ratsadon, she, and her husband Svasti Sobhana and other royals, went into exile on Penang Island.

Princess Abha Barni died on 6 August 1938 at the age of 64. Her royal funeral was held at Wat Thepsirinthrawat.

== Issue ==
Princess Abha Barni married Svastiratana Kulyavadhana, son of Mongkut. The couple had nine children together. Prince Seri Svastikamol Svastivatana, Prince Sobhon Bharadaya Svastivatana who is married with Princess Mayurachatra, Mom Tuaengnuan and Mom Prathueng Svativatana Na Ayudhya, Queen Rambai Barni, who is the Queen of Thailand when married to Prajadhipok, Prince Mai, Prince Duaeng, Prince Nanyadivat Svastivatana who is married with Mom Chao Suvabhab Berabanna Vudhijaya, Prince Orachun Jitsanu Svastivatana who is married with Princess Chandrakanmani, Prince Rodramabhat Svastivatana, and Prince Yuditya Sathira Svastivatana, who is married with Mom Rajawongse Battaratridhot Devakula.

== Honours ==
- Dame Grand Cross (First Class) of the Most Illustrious Order of Chula Chom Klao (1929)
- Companion (Third Class, lower grade) of the Most Illustrious Order of Chula Chom Klao (1893)
- King Rama VI Royal Cypher Medal, 3rd Class (1923)
- King Rama VII Royal Cypher Medal, 1st Class (1926)
