= Phannarai =

Thai royal consort (1838–1914)

Phannarai; พรรณราย
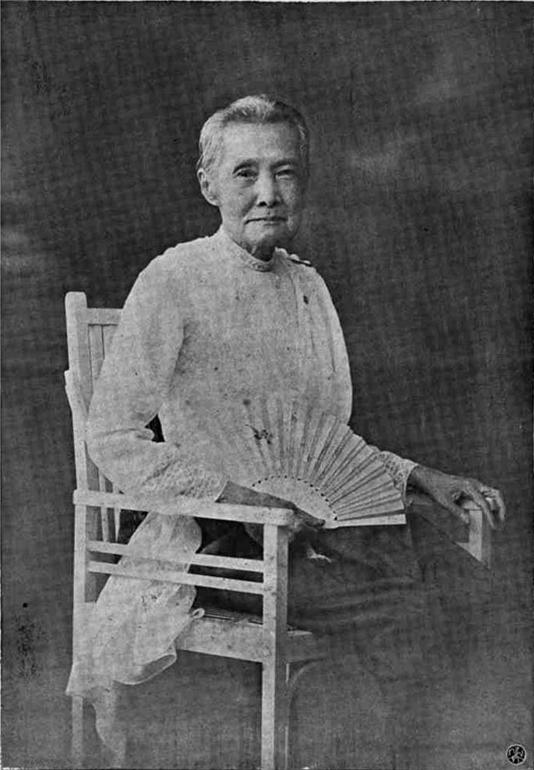

Consort of the Siamese monarch
- Tenure: 1855 – 1 October 1868
- Born: Chae Siriwong; 9 May 1838; Bangkok, Siam
- Died: 22 June 1914 (aged 76); Bangkok, Siam
- Spouse: Mongkut (Rama IV)
- Issue: Kannikakaew; Narisara Nuwattiwong
- Dynasty: Chakri
- Father: Siriwong
- Mother: Kim Saechio

Phannarai (Thai: พรรณราย; 9 May 1838 – 22 June 1914), formerly Princess Chae Siriwong (แฉ่ ศิริวงศ์), was one of the consorts of Mongkut of Siam, fourth King of the Chakri dynasty.

Princess Chae Siriwongse was a daughter of Prince Siriwong, the Prince Mattayaphithak (a son of Nangklao) and Lady Kim. Princess Chae and her sister, Princess Ramphoei Siriwong, became the consorts of King Mongkut in 1851 (Princess Ramphoei later became Queen Debsirindra). When her sister died in 1861, she assumed the position as the senior consort of Mongkut.

Although she was not elevated to the rank of queen, she ruled over the court ladies and her position as a queen was observed during various banquets for foreign emissaries. The character of Lady Thiang in The King and I is loosely based on her. Anna Leonowens came to the royal court in 1862 and left in 1867, a period of six years in which she was in charge of Lady Phannarai's children and the other children of King Mongkut.

With Mongkut, Princess Phannarai bore:

- Princess Kannikakaew, Krom Khun Khattiyakanlaya (1855–1882)
- Prince Chitchareon, Krom Phraya Narisara Nuwattiwong (1863–1947)

As she was the aunt of Chulalongkorn (Rama V) (Queen Debsirindra's son), Mom Chao Chae was elevated to Phra Ong Chao Phannarai in 1900. She died in 1914.
