= Wat Benchamabophit =

Buddhist temple in Bangkok, Thailand

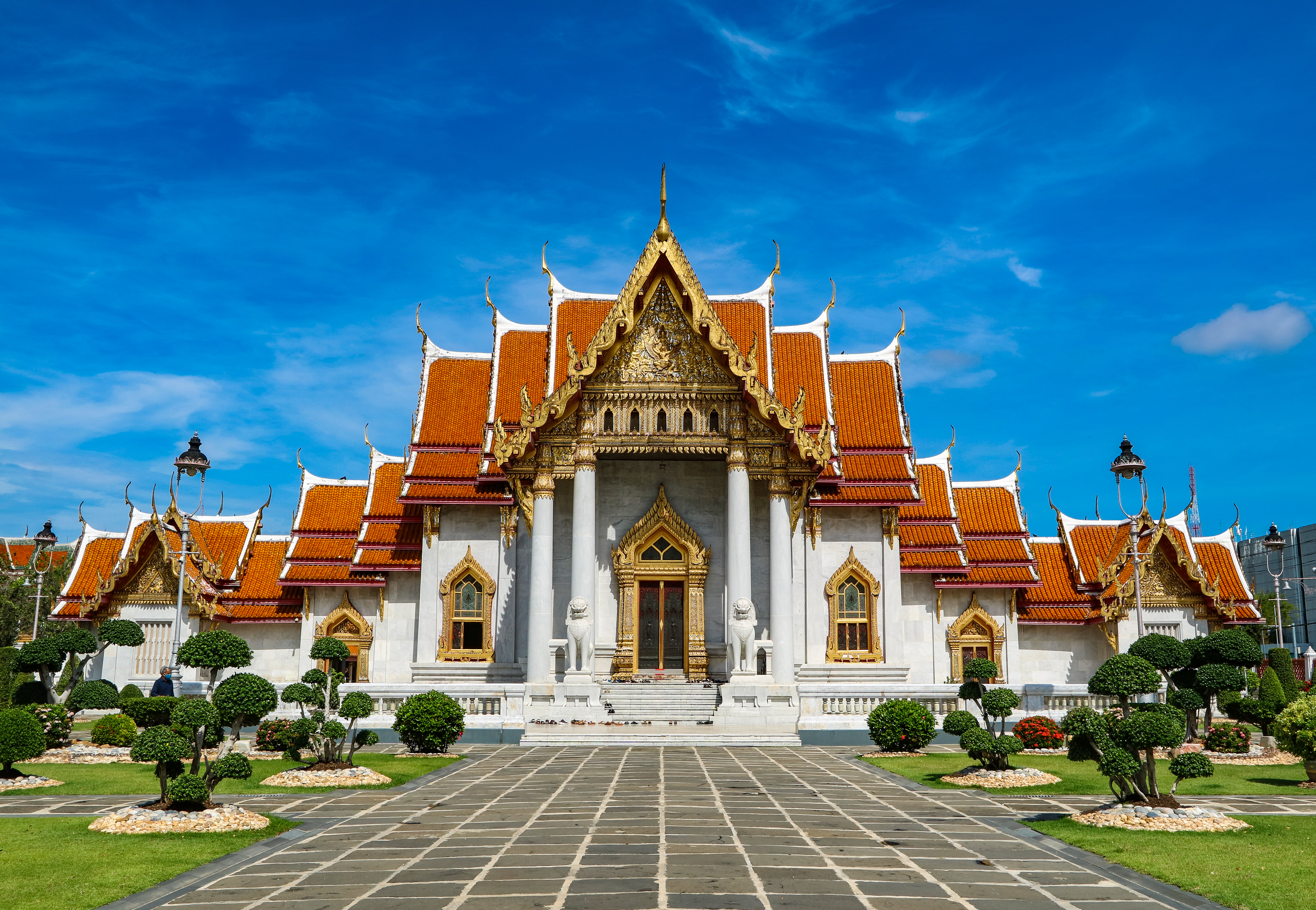

- Location in Bangkok

Religion
- Affiliation: Theravada Buddhism

Location
- Location: Dusit District, Bangkok
- Country: Thailand
- Interactive map of Wat Benchamabophit
- Coordinates: 13°45′59.7″N 100°30′50.7″E

Architecture
- Architect: Prince Narisara Nuwattiwong
- Completed: 1911; 115 years ago

Wat Benchamabophit Dusitvanaram (Thai: วัดเบญจมบพิตรดุสิตวนาราม;) is a Buddhist temple (wat) located in the Dusit District of Bangkok, Thailand. Also known as the Marble Temple, it is one of the city's most renowned religious landmarks and a major tourist attraction. The temple is celebrated for its refined architectural composition, exemplifying Bangkok's ornate style with high gables, multi-tiered roofs, and elaborate finials. Its layout and decorative program reflect a synthesis of traditional Thai aesthetics with subtle European influences introduced during the reign of Chulalongkorn.

== Construction ==
Construction of the temple began in 1899 at the request of King Chulalongkorn after building his palace nearby. The temple's name literally means 'the Temple of the fifth King located near Dusit Palace'. It was designed by Prince Naris, a half-brother of the king, and is built of Italian marble. It has display of Carrara marble pillars, a marble courtyard and two large singhas (lions) guarding the entrance to the bot. The interiors are decorated with crossbeams of lacquer and gold, and in shallow niches in the walls of paintings of important stupas all over the country. The cloister around the assembly hall houses 52 images of Buddha.

== The temple ==
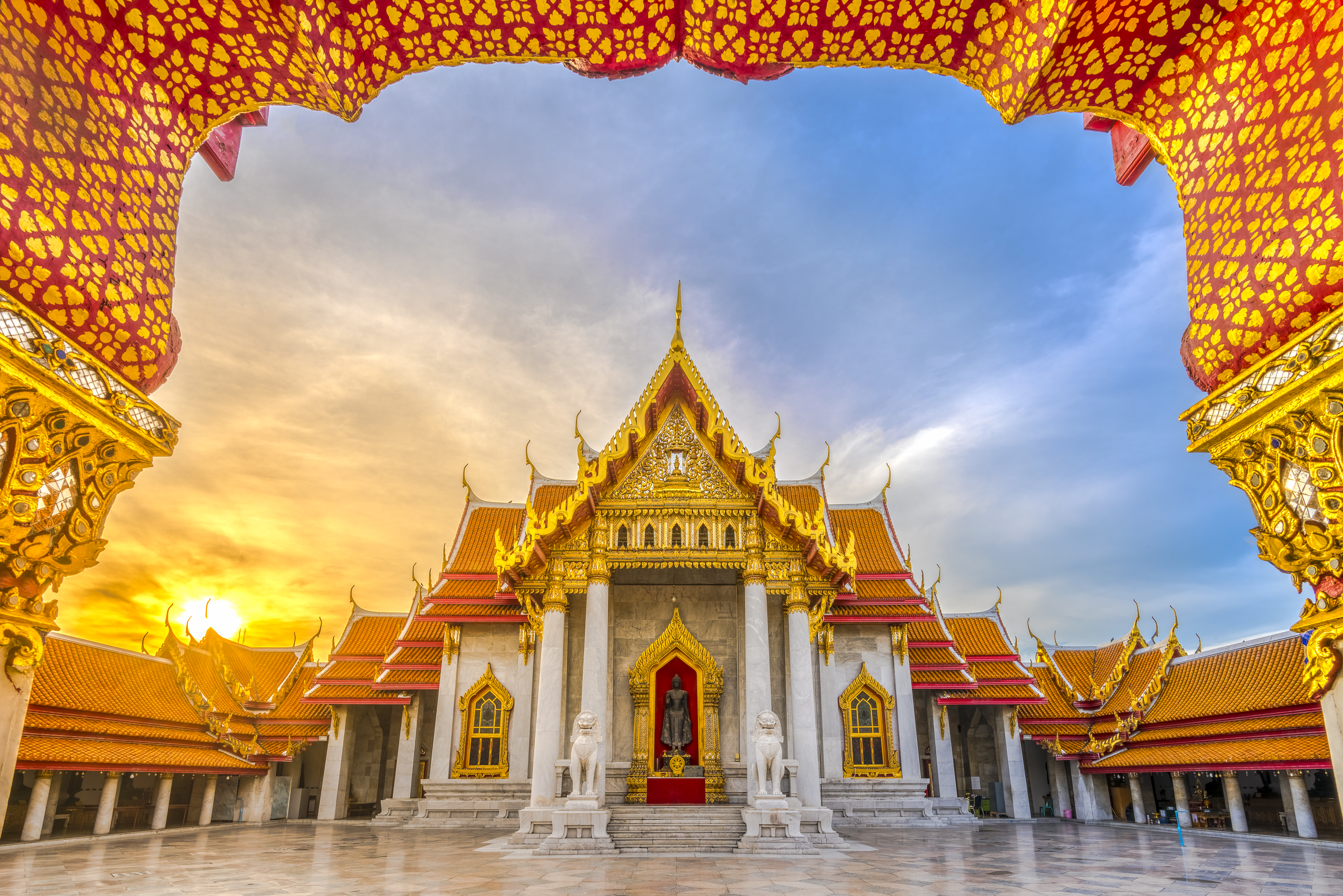
The Ordination Hall

The ordination hall (ubosot) was designed and supervised by Prince Narisara Nuwattiwong in a cruciform plan, with an elongated eastern porch and side porches linking to the surrounding cloister. Its design combines traditional Thai and Khmer-inspired forms with Western elements: multi-tiered, ornamented roofs and carved gilt pediments on each façade follow Thai convention, while the cloister, barred blind windows and boundary stones (sema) show Khmer influence. The hall stands within a balustraded enclosure, with lotus-bud and Dharmachakra boundary markers set in pink and grey granite paving. Italian marble facing and stained-glass panels above the windows, which admit coloured light into the interior in a manner reminiscent of Christian churches, reflect Western influence.

== Replica of Phra Phuttha Chinnarat ==
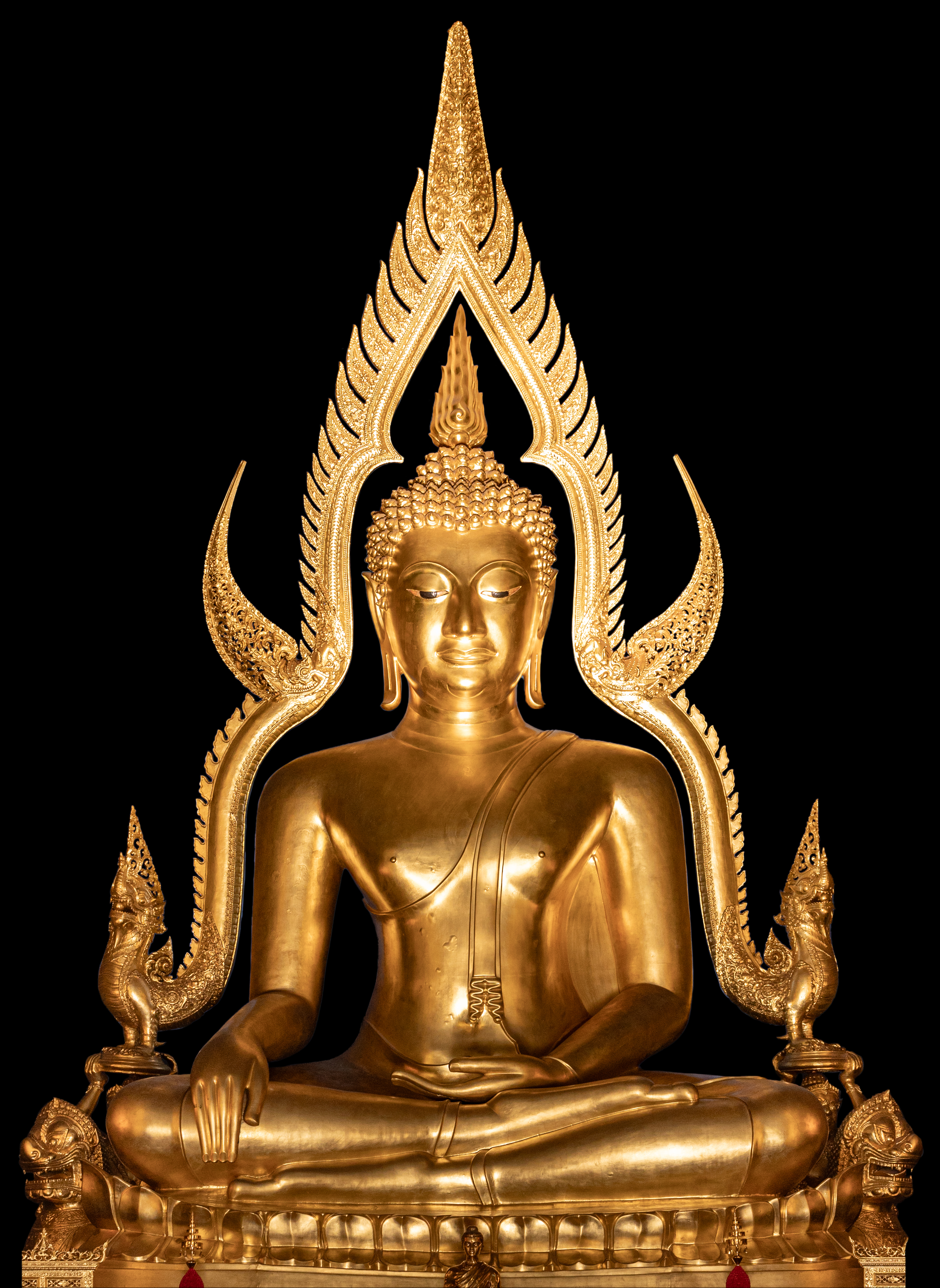
Replica of Phra Phuttha Chinnarat inside the ubosot

Inside the ordination hall stands the principal Buddha image, a Sukhothai-style statue known as Phra Buddhajinaraja. Modelled on the original at Wat Phra Si Rattana Mahathat in Phitsanulok, it was cast in 1920 and is a copy of Phra Buddha Chinarat, the renowned Buddha image enshrined in Phitsanulok in northern Thailand. The ashes of King Chulalongkorn are interred beneath the statue.

The replica of Phra Phuttha Chinnarat was commissioned by King Chulalongkorn (Rama V), who wished to install a Buddha image of exceptional beauty as the principal image of the ubosot. He held particular admiration for the original image at Wat Phra Si Rattana Mahathat, which he had visited with his father, King Mongkut (Rama IV), during his novice ordination in 1866. King Chulalongkorn assigned Prince Damrong Rajanubhab to supervise the casting, with Phra Prasit Pattima as the principal craftsman. The image was cast in Phitsanulok using melted, decommissioned brass cannons; the casting ceremony began on 20 October 1901, and the completed image was enshrined at Wat Benchamabophit on 13 December 1901, followed by an eye-opening ritual and consecration.

The replica belongs to the Sukhothai "Phra Phuttha Chinnarat" subgroup. It depicts the Buddha in the māra-vijaya posture, with an egg-shaped face, small curls of hair, a flame-like aureole, broad shoulders and a narrow waist. A slender strip of the sanghati descends to the navel and splits into two inward-curving tips, while the fingers of the right hand are of equal length.

In the gallery surrounding the ordination hall are 52 Buddha statues, each displaying a different mudra (gesture), collected by Prince Damrong Rajanubhab for his king. The temple complex also contains the Benchamabophit National Museum. The image of the temple's façade appears on the reverse of the five-baht coin of the Thai currency, and the temple served as the tenth and final elimination pit stop on The Amazing Race 9.

== Canal ==
Along the side of the marble ubosot of Wat Benchamabophit runs a small canal (khlong) crossed by three bridges: Saphan Phra Rup (สะพานพระรูป), Saphan Thuai (สะพานถ้วย), and Saphan Ngan (สะพานเงิน).

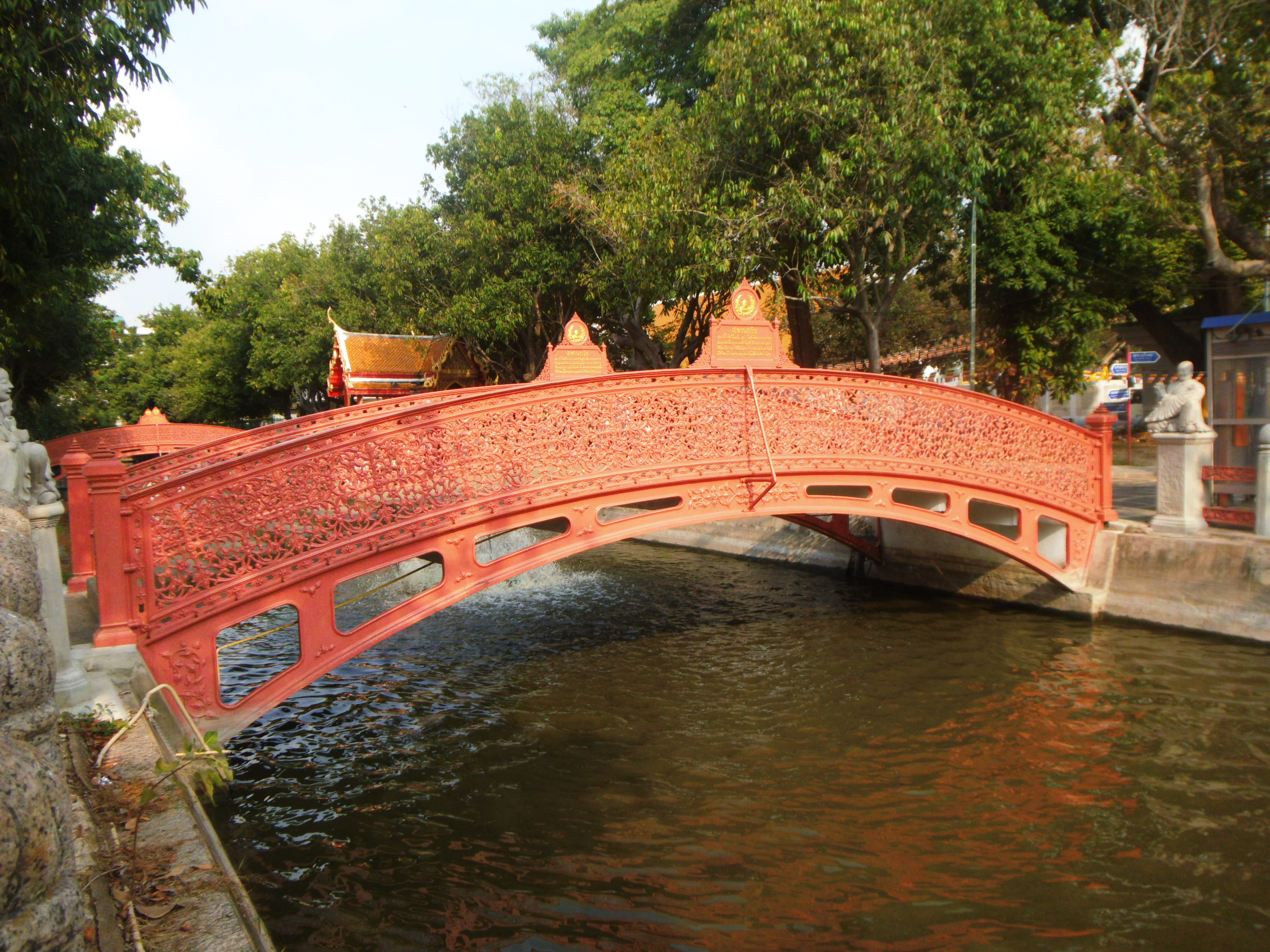
Bridge over the canal beside the marble ubosot.

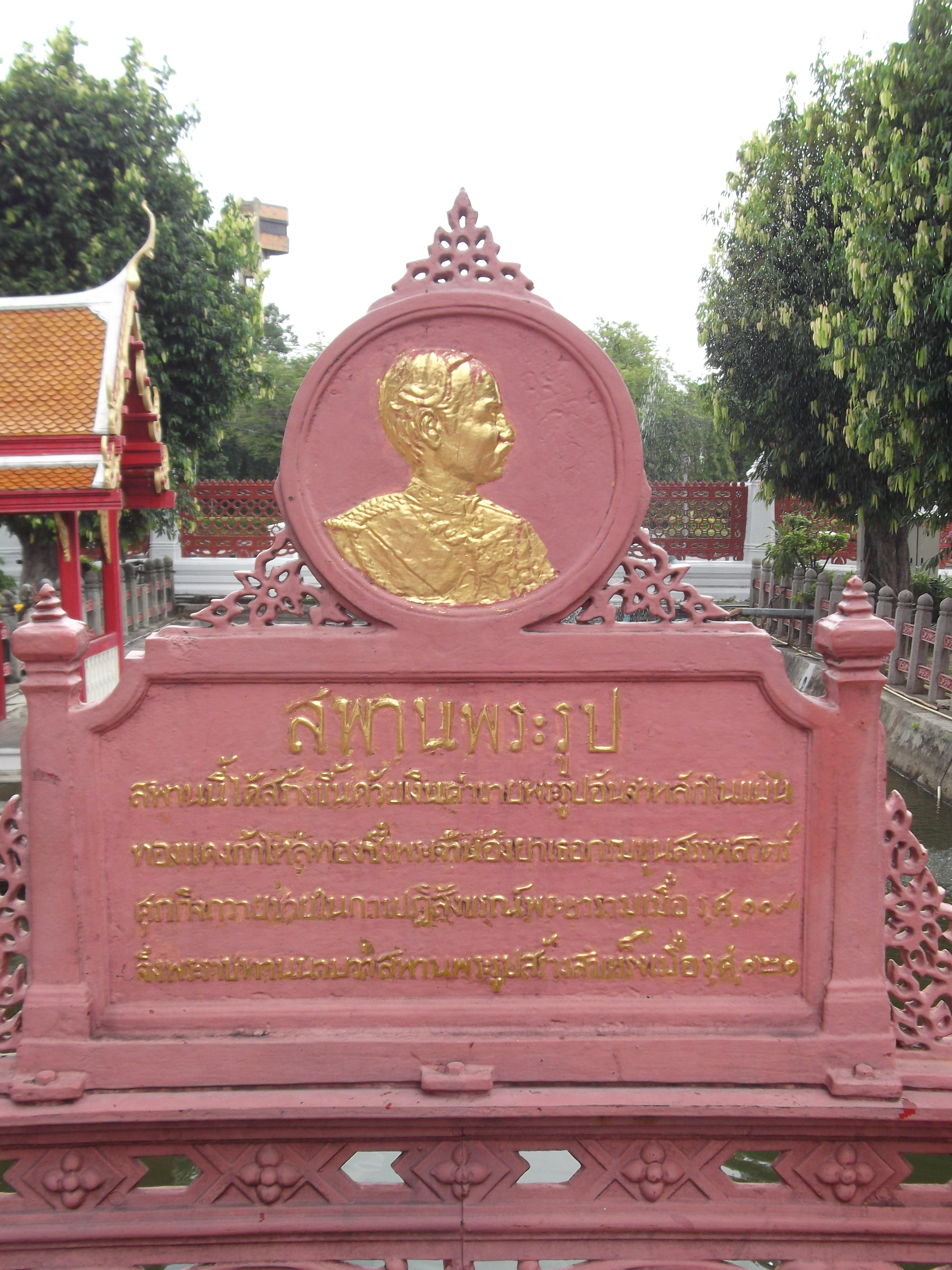
Saphan Phra Rup: plaque noting the bridge was funded by Prince Sanphasat Suphakit from proceeds of selling gilded embossed copper plaques; built in R.S. 119 (1900) and completed in R.S. 121 (1902).

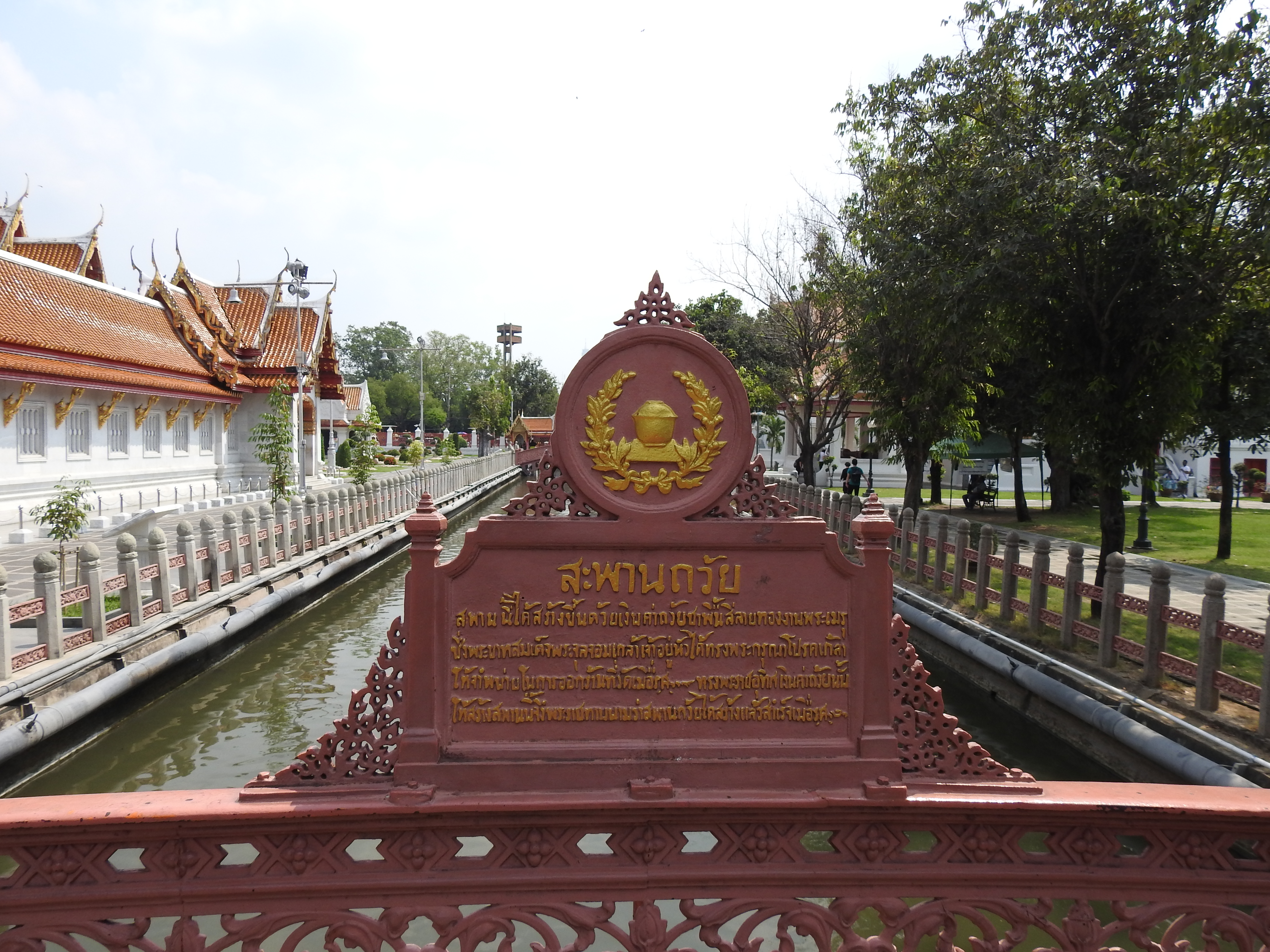
Inscription on Saphan Thuai (Cup Bridge): funded by proceeds from the sale of gilded tea cups from the royal cremation ceremony; dedicated by King Chulalongkorn (Rama V) in R.S. 119 (1900) and completed in R.S. 121 (1902).

== Worship and festivals ==
Merit makers come to the monks of the temple for getting alms every morning. Between 06:00–07:30 in the morning, monks line up on Nakhon Pathom with their bowls to receive donations of curry, rice, lotus buds, incense, toiletries and other essentials. The evening candlelight procession around the bot during the Buddhist festivals of Magha Puja (in February) and Visakha Puja (in May) are common at this temple.

== Protection ==
In 2005, the temple was submitted to UNESCO for consideration as a future World Heritage Site.

== Gallery ==
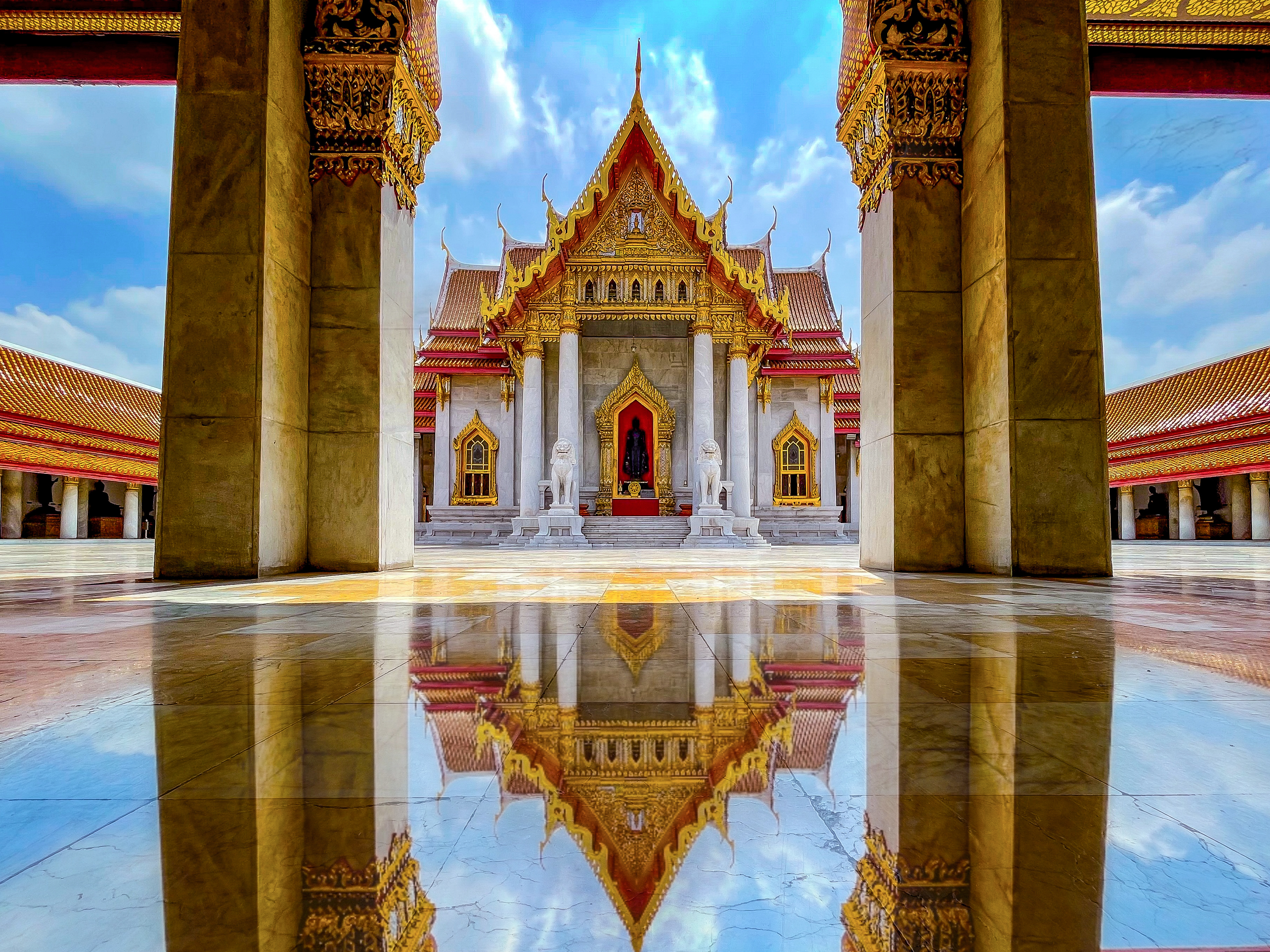
The marble ordination hall (ubosot)

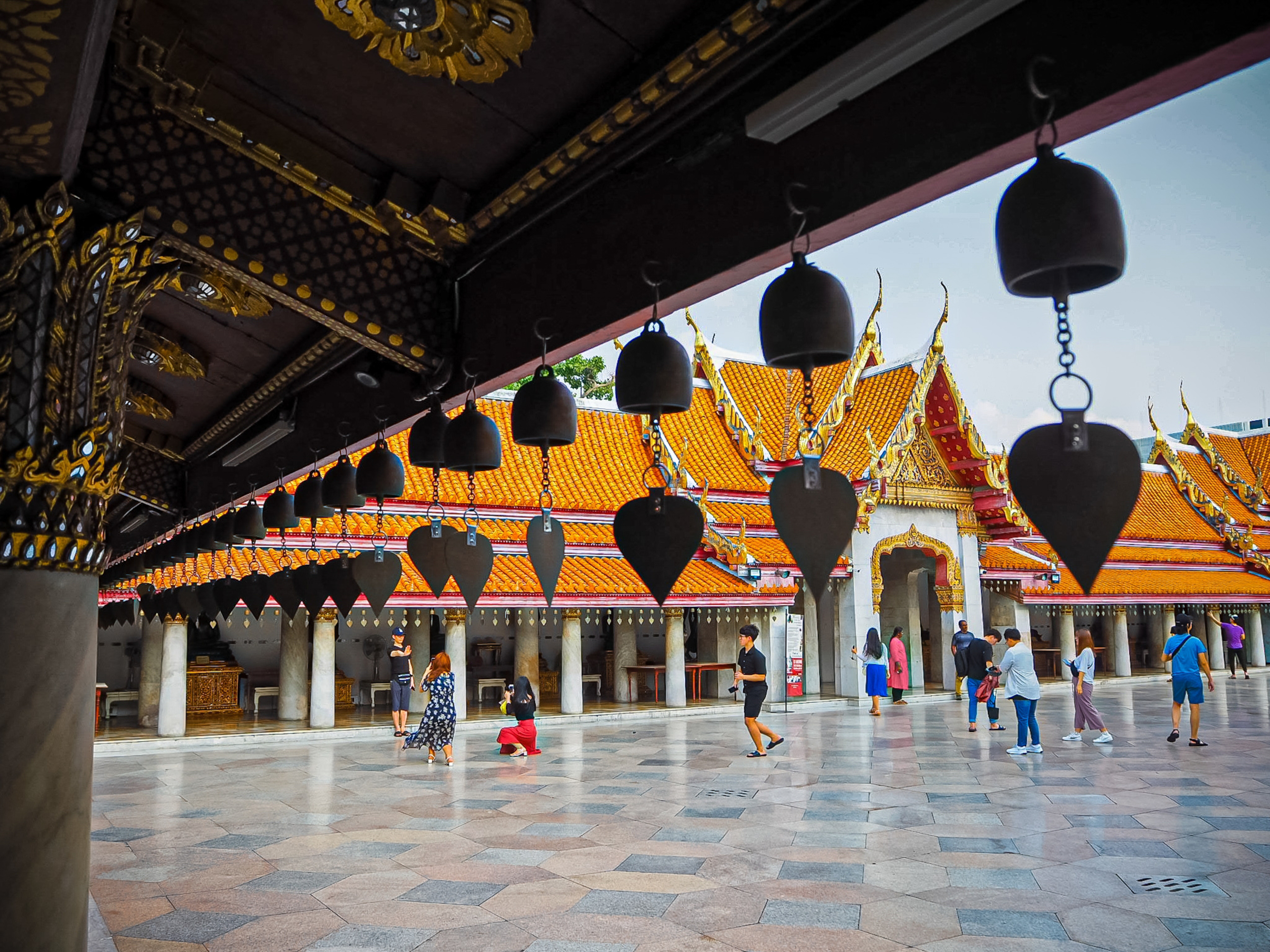
The cloister, with rows of hanging bells along the eaves.

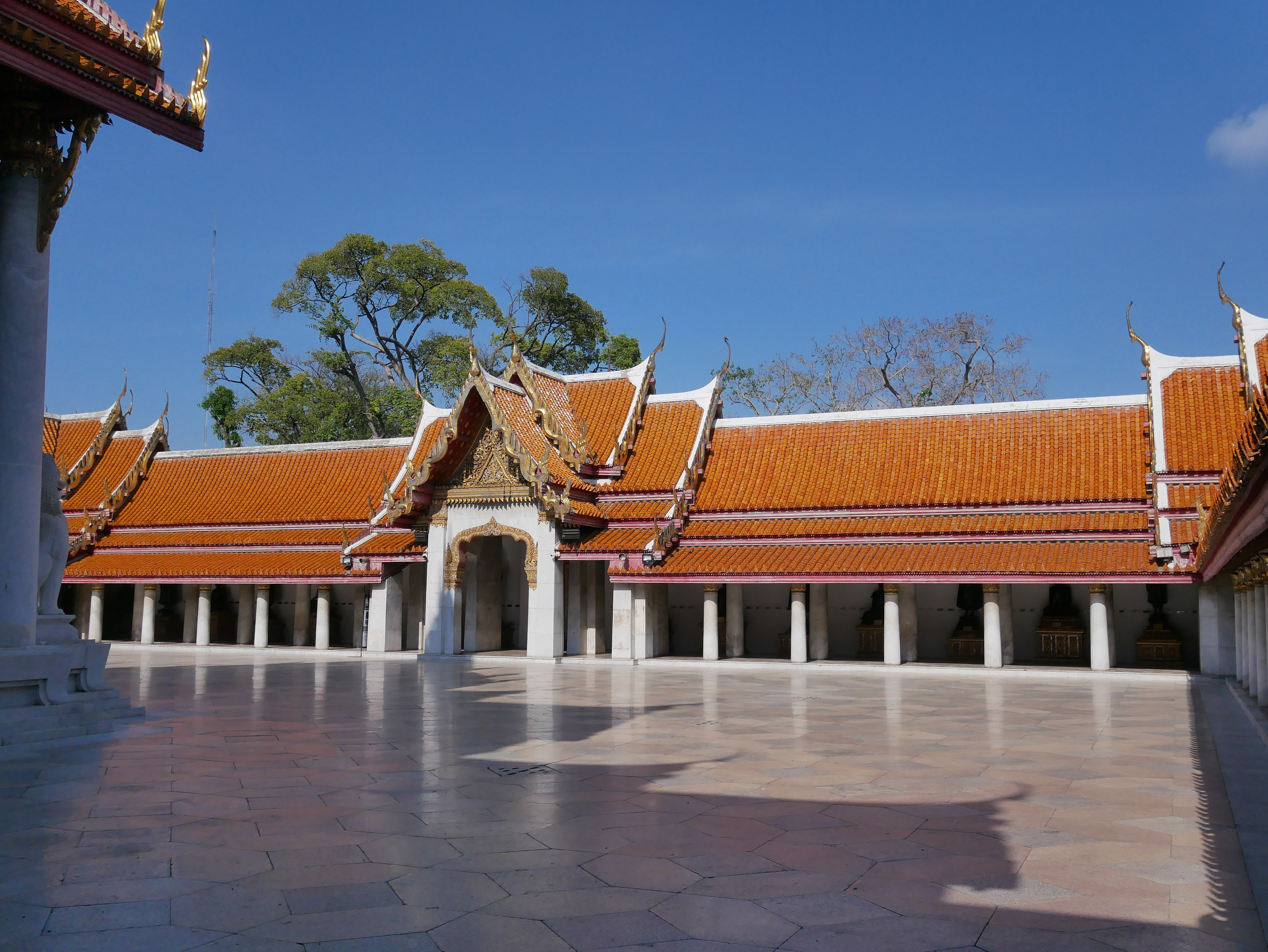
The cloister

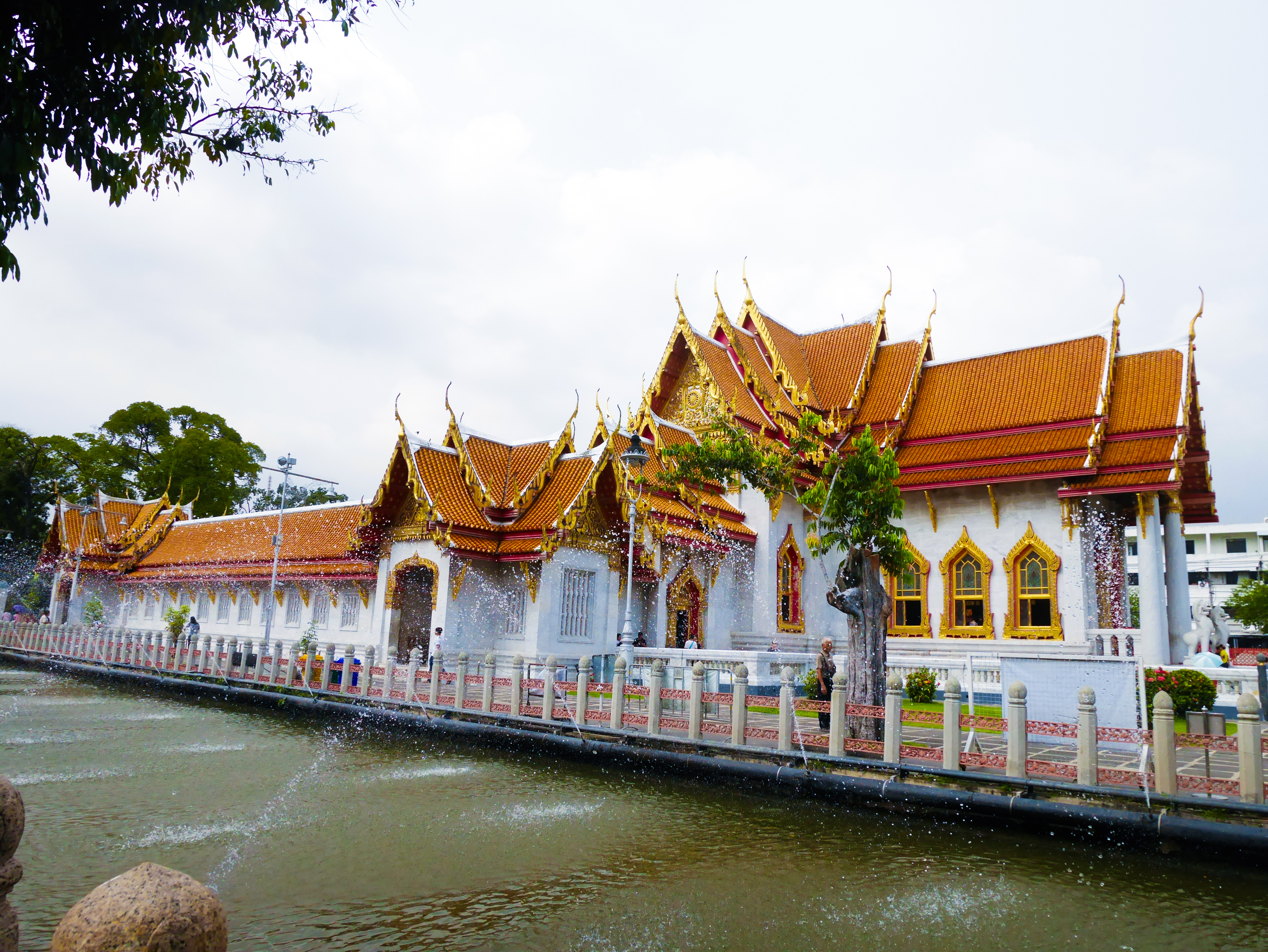
khlong and the ubosot

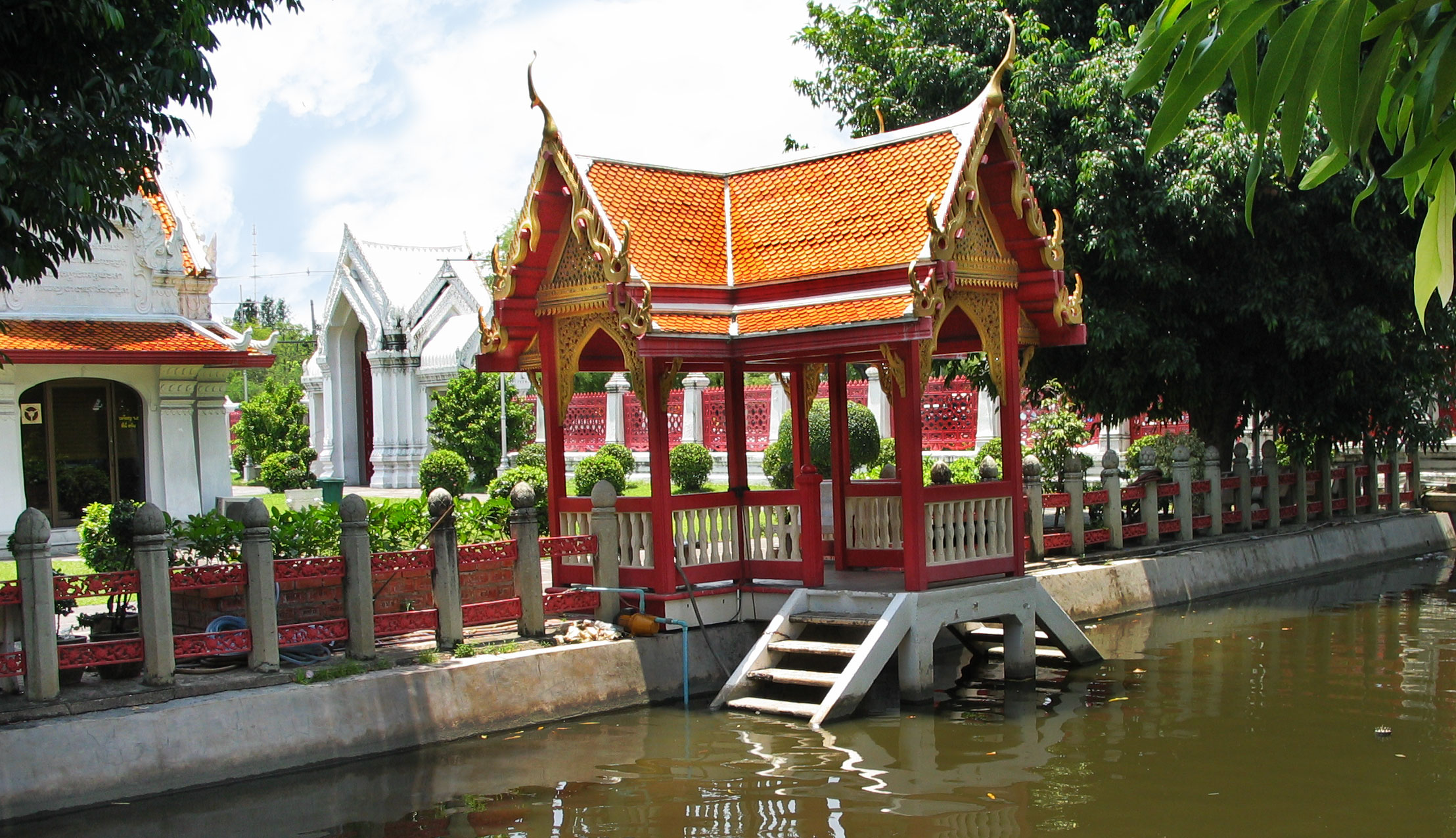
"Sala Nam" at khlong in temple compound

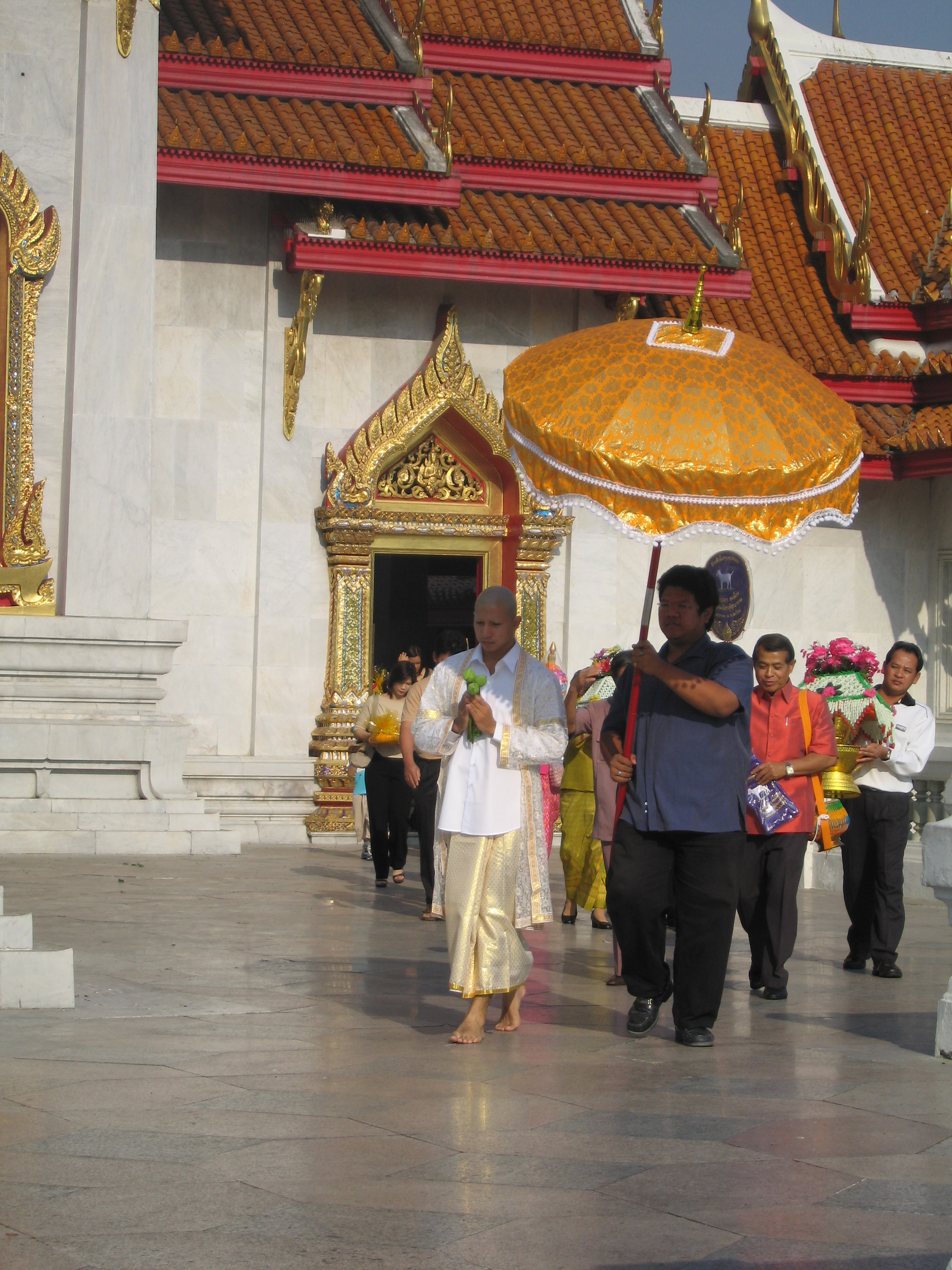
A new monk is ordained in the temple, January 2005

Monks as seen from the outside (photography is not permitted inside the temple)

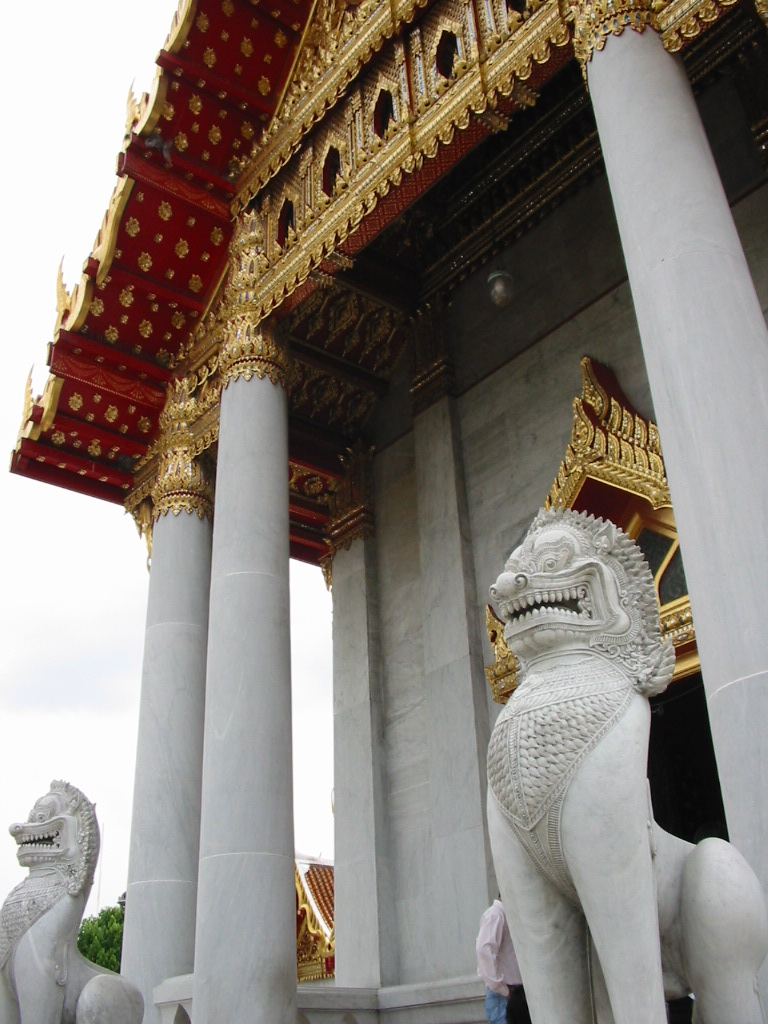
In front of The Marble Temple

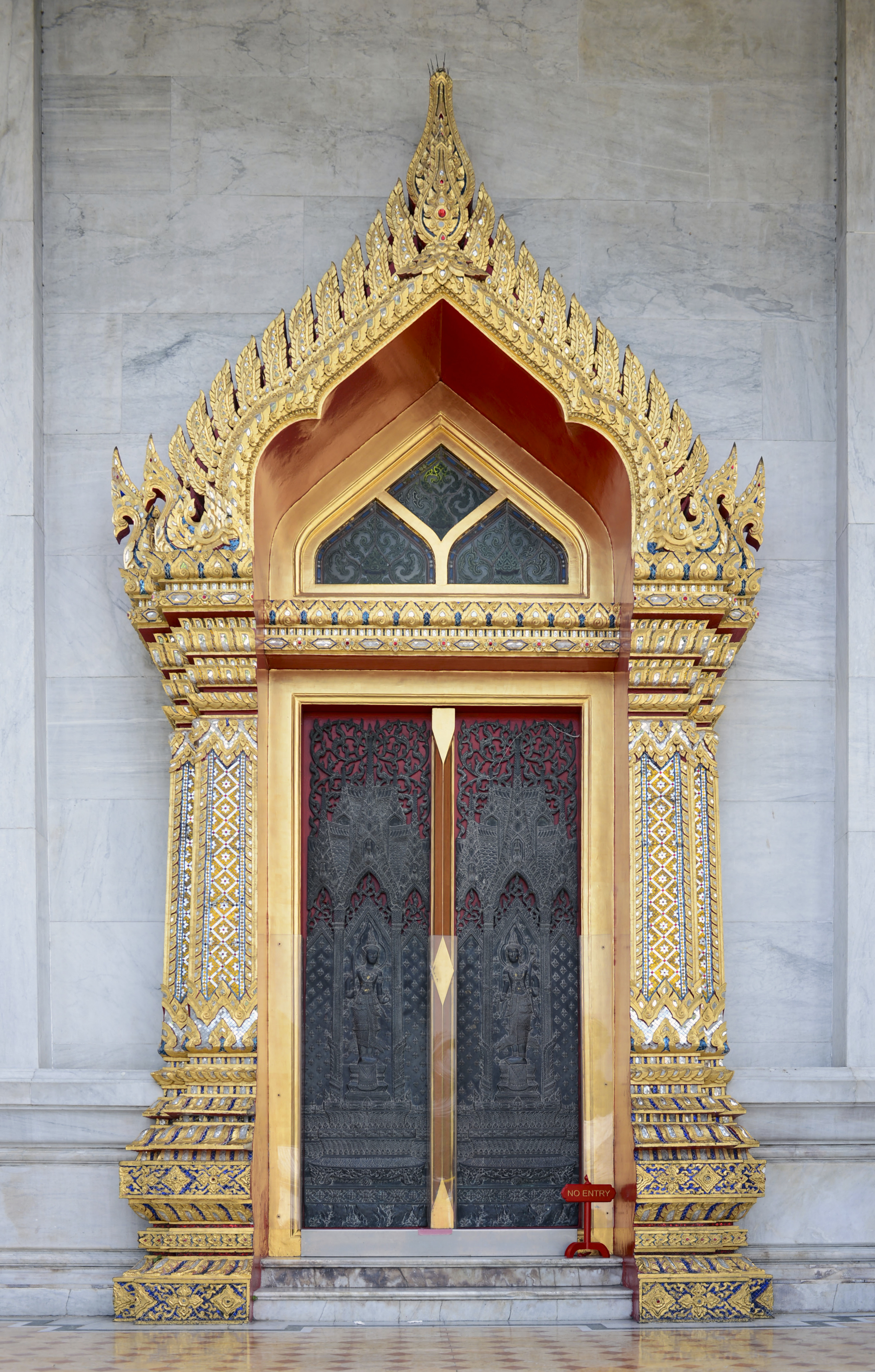
The temple door with elaborate design

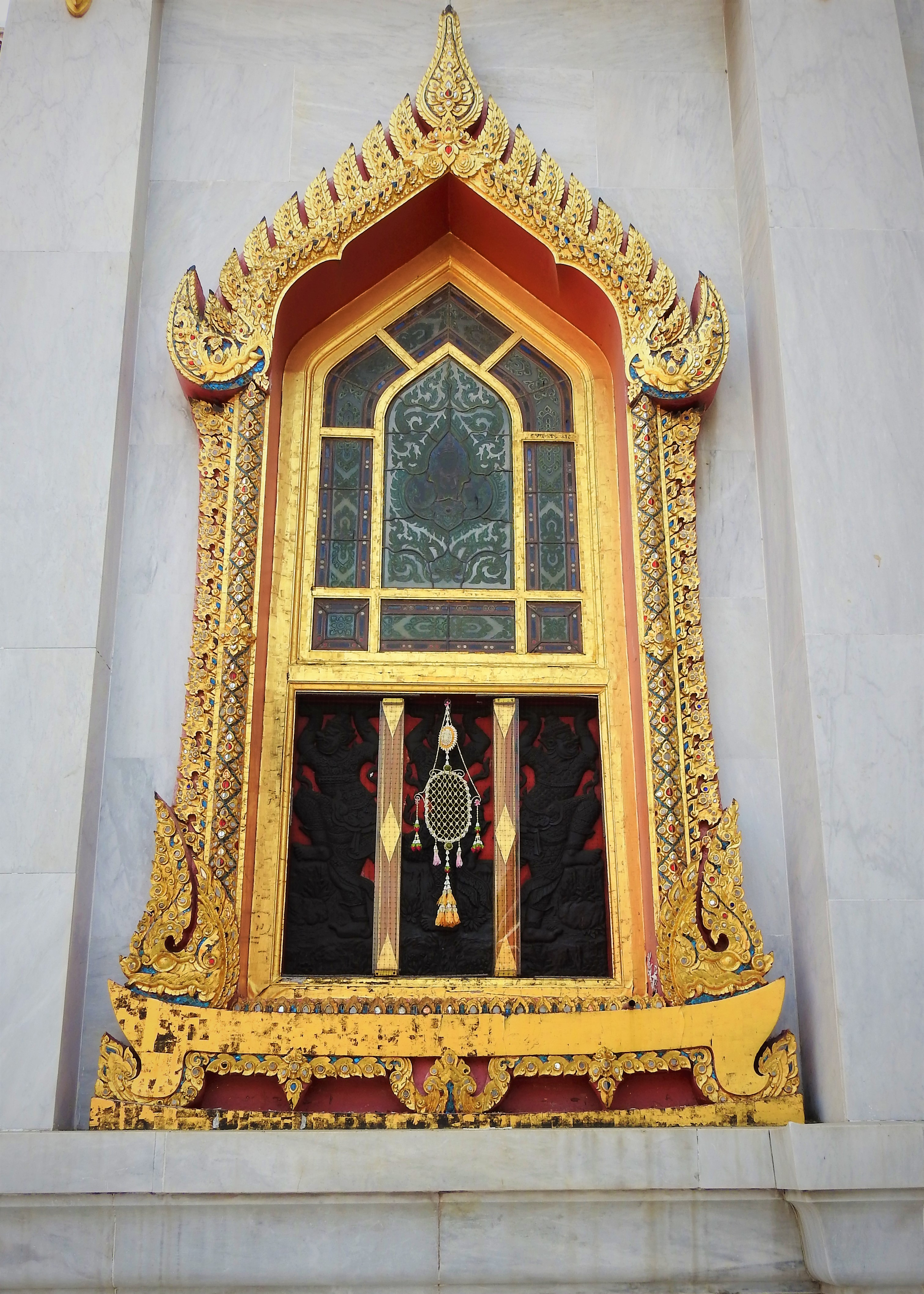
Window with Thai-style ornamentation

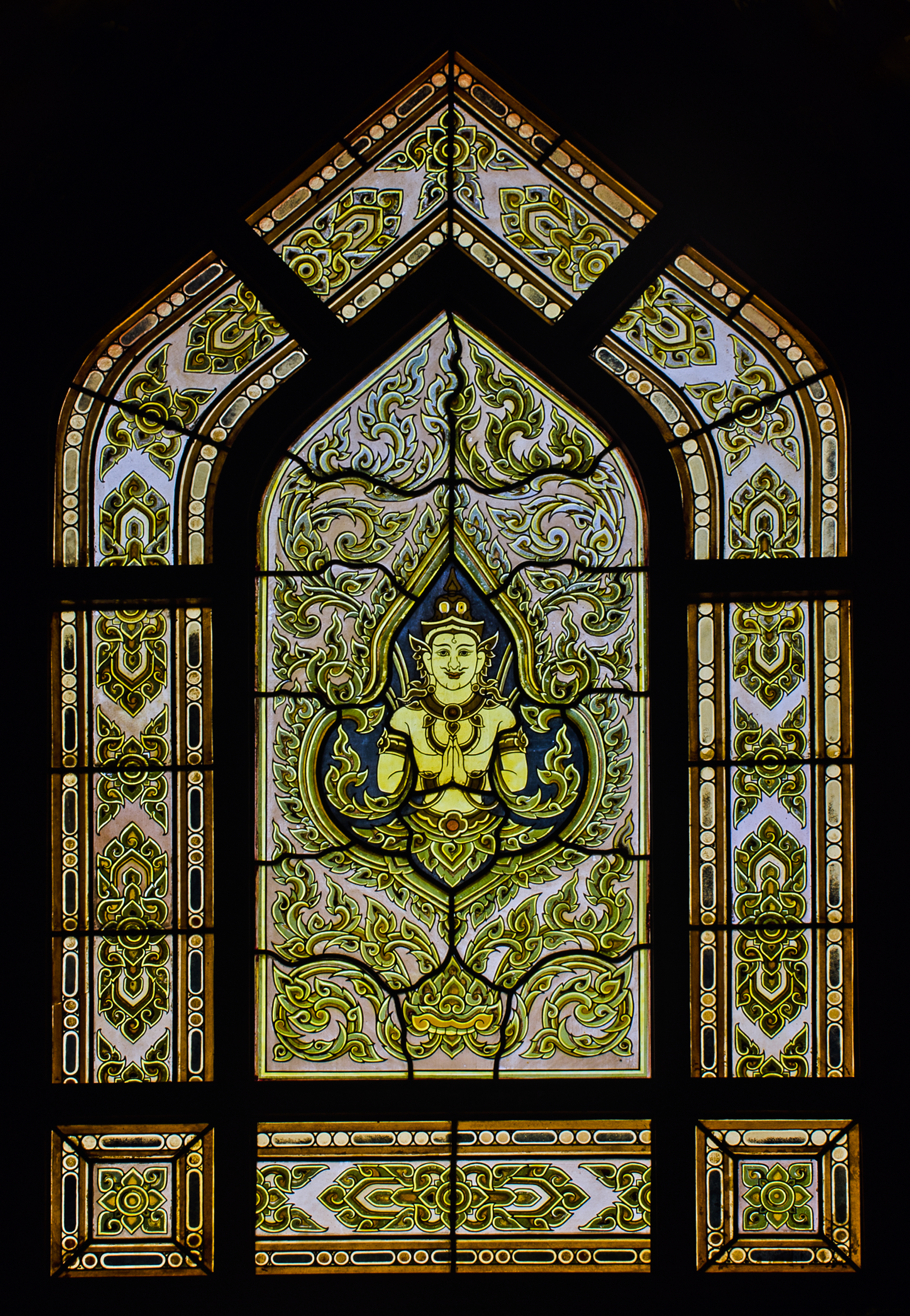
Interior stained glass windows of the Ubosot

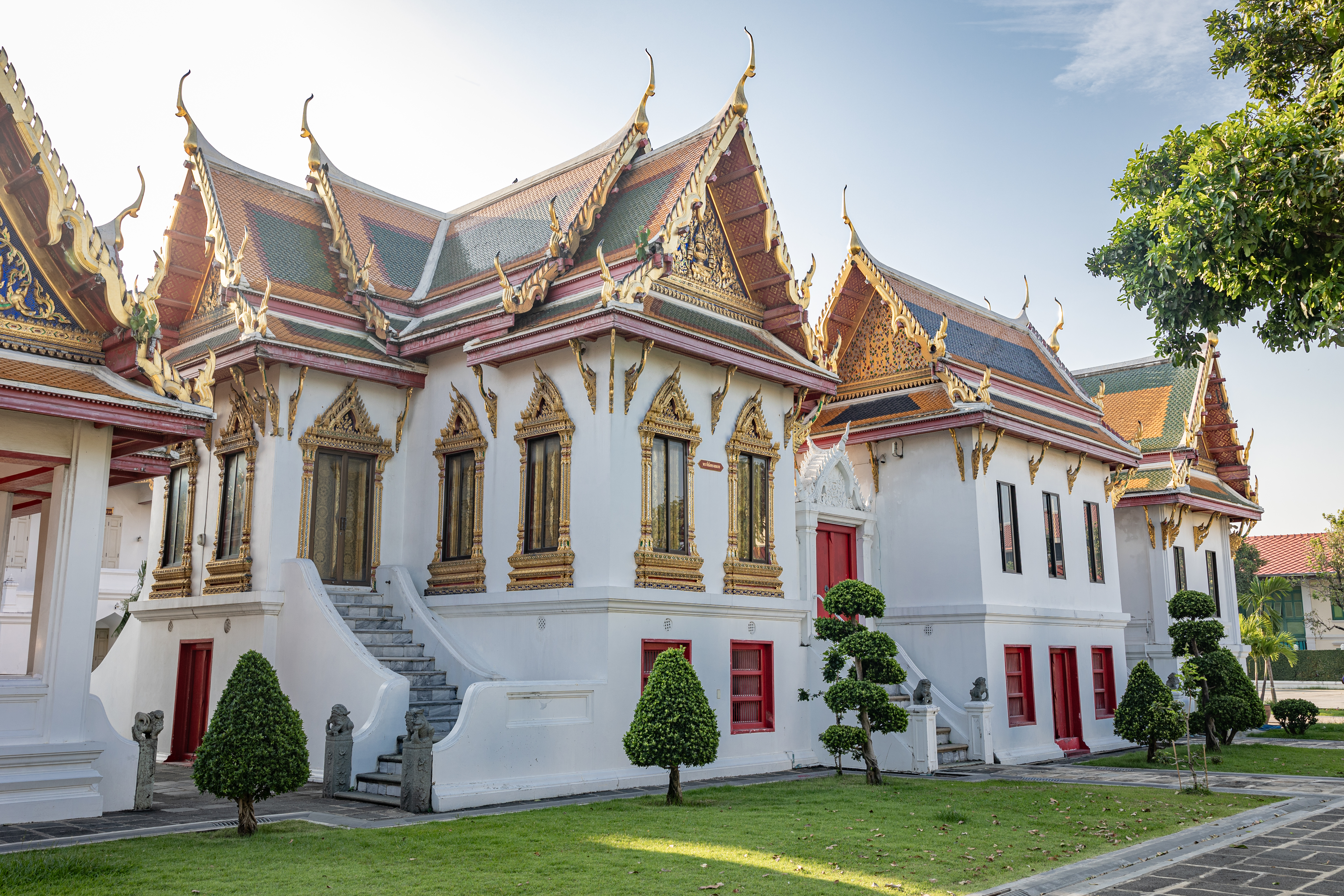
Phra Thinang Song Phanot, a royal pavilion within Wat Benchamabophit

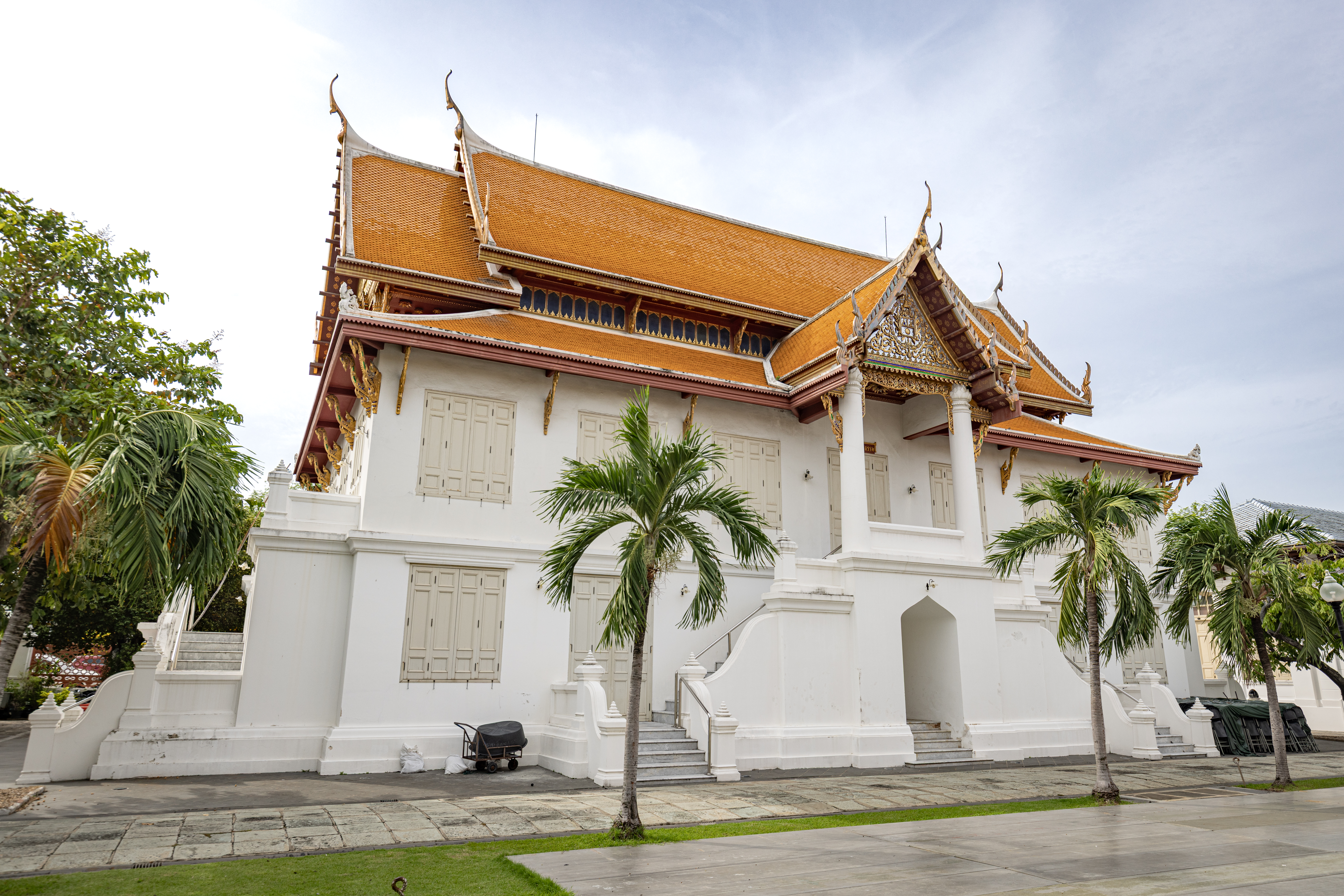
Phra Thinang Song Tham, a royal pavilion within Wat Benchamabophit

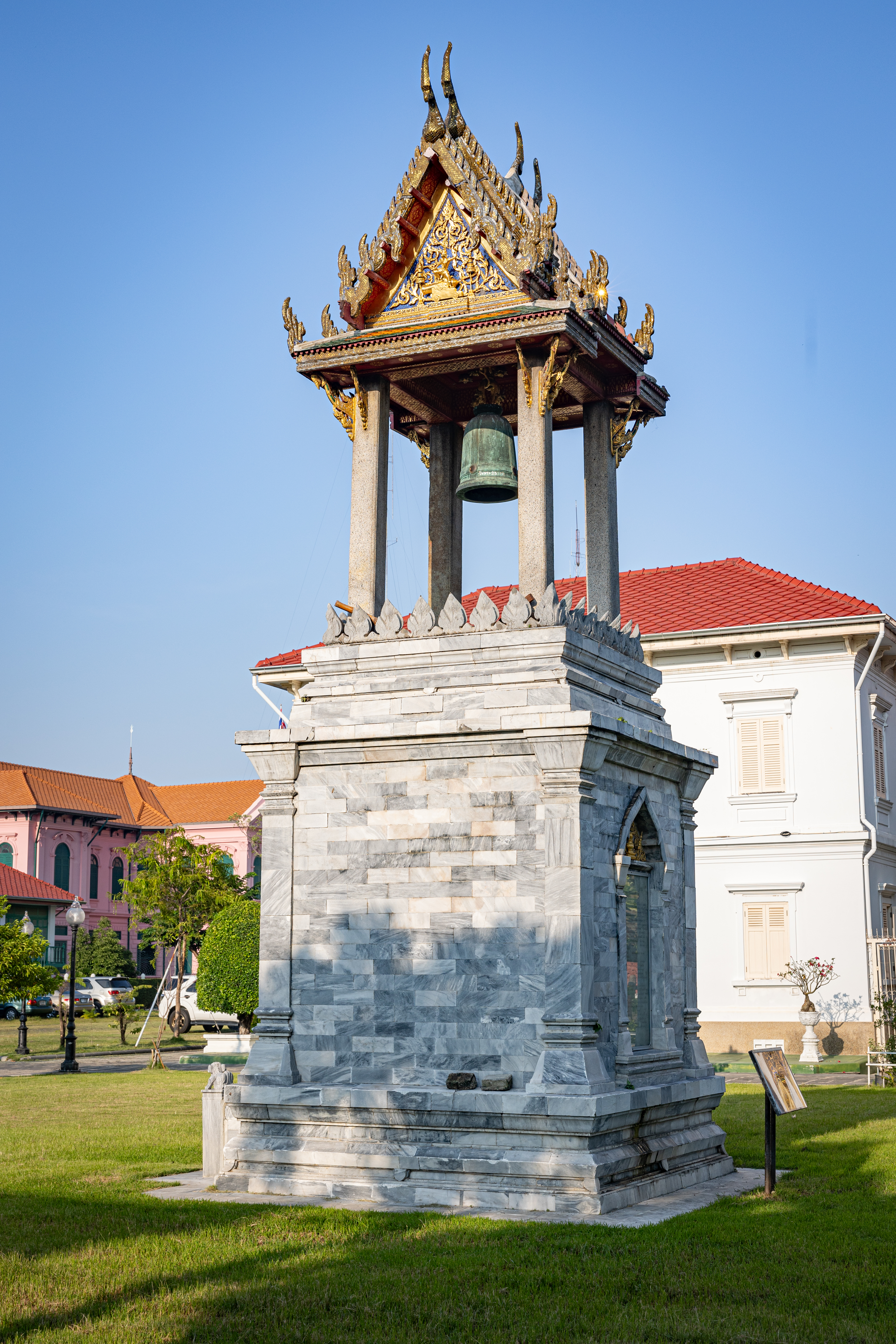
Bowarawong Bell Tower
