= Chavi Vilaya Gagananga =

- Princess of Siam
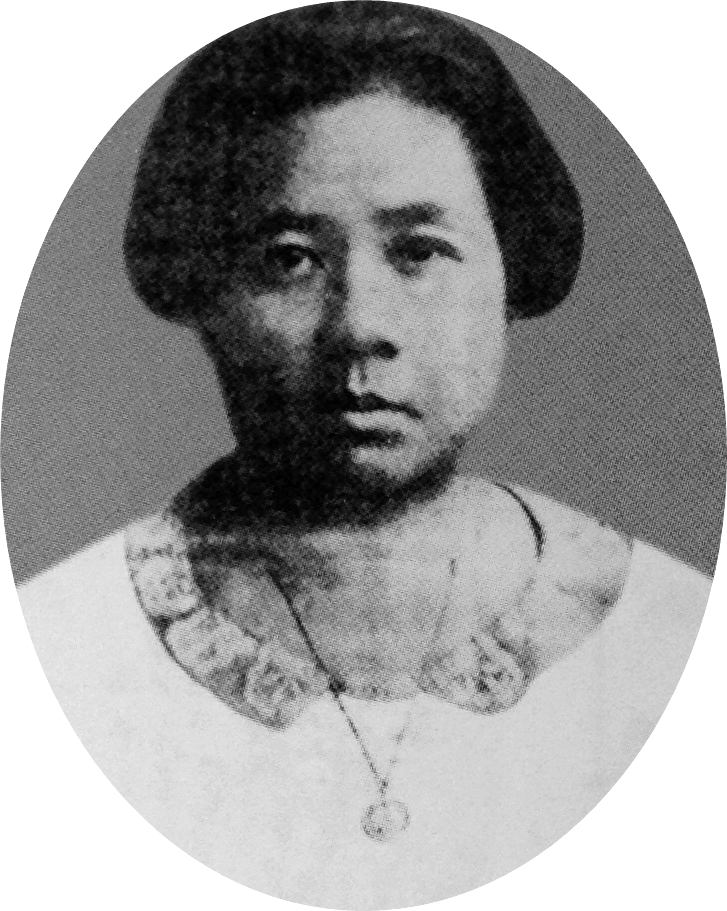
- Born: 29 March 1881; Bangkok, Siam
- Died: 14 November 1930 (aged 49); Bangkok, Siam
- Spouse: Prince Svasti Sobhana, the Prince Svastivatana Visishtha
- Issue: 11 children
- House: Chakri Dynasty
- Father: Gagananga Yukala, The Prince Bijitprijakara
- Mother: Mom Sun Gagananga Na Ayudhya

Chavi Vilaya Gagananga (Thai: ฉวีวิลัย คัคณางค์ ; RTGS: Chawi wilai Khakkanang :complete title: Her Serene Highness Princess (Mom Chao) Chavi Vilaya Gagananga Thai: ฉวีวิลัย คัคณางค์ ; 29 March 1881 – 14 November 1930) is a Princess of Siam, a member of Siamese royal family and a member of House of Gagananga a royal house which was originated by her father, Prince Gagananga Yukala and descends from Chakri Dynasty.

== Issue ==
She had 11 children with Prince Svasti Sobhana;

- Prince Birayot Yugala Svastivatana (16 January 1907 - 29 May 1976) Married with Mom Esther Svastivatana na Ayudhya
- Princess Rassadit Svastivatana (21 July 1909 - 23 August 1996) Married with Prince Samai Chalerm Kritakara, son of Prince Nares Varariddhi
- Princess Bussadi Vilas Svastivatana (5 February 1910 - 8 August 1957)
- Princess Phongphas Mani Svastivatana (2 October 1912 - 26 March 1983) Married with Prince Karvik Chakrabandhu
- Prince Kokasatriya Svastivatana (27 January 1913 - 15 May 1970) Married with Mom Nelly Svastivatana na Ayudhya
- Princess Phongsri Vilaya Svastivatana (23 April 1915 - 8 July 1994)
- Prince Lolitai Svastivatana (16 April 1916 - 1918)
- Princess Sida Damruang Svastivatana (2 August 1918 - 25 August 1990) Married with Prince Kamalisan Chumbol
- Princess Madri Sobhana Svastivatana (11 December 1919 - 15 July 2003) Married with Fuen Dulyachinda
- Prince Nangakul Svasdi Svastivatana (20 March 1920 - 12 September 1964)
- Princess Visakha Nujchavi Svastivatana (18 July 1922 - 30 October 2012) Married with Boshuku Utagawa
