= Srisiddhi Thongjaya =

- Prince Siridhaj Sangkas
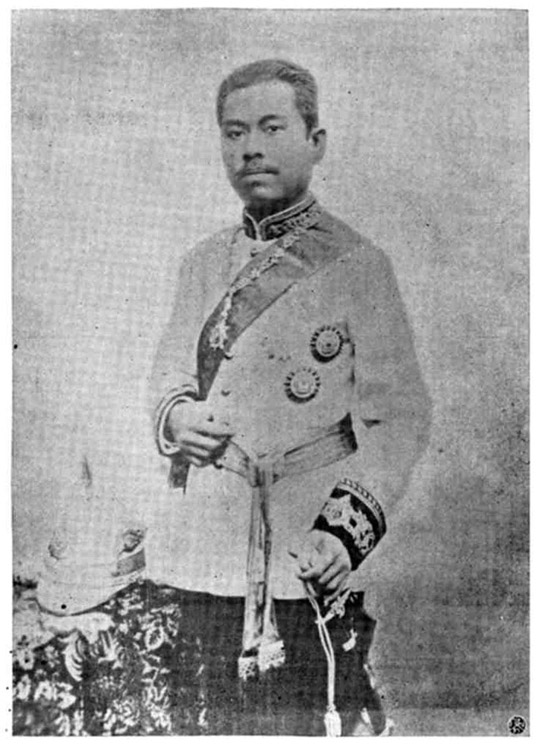
- Born: 16 October 1857; Bangkok, Siam
- Died: 11 March 1910 (aged 52); Bangkok, Siam
- Spouse: Um Thipphawat; Sa-ngiam Na Nagara; Phuean
Names
- Srisiddhi Thongjaya, the Prince Siridhaj Sangkas
- House: House of Sridavaj (Chakri Dynasty)
- Father: Mongkut (Rama IV)
- Mother: Bua Na Nagara

Minister of Royal Treasury
- In office 1894–1896
- Preceded by: Narisara Nuwattiwong
- Succeeded by: Jayanta Mongkol

2nd Director General of the Supreme Court of Thailand
- In office 1889 – 1912
- Monarchs: Chulalongkorn; Vajiravudh
- Preceded by: Gagananga Yukala
- Succeeded by: Svasti Sobhana

Prince Srisiddhi Thongjaya, the Prince Siridhaj Sangkas (Thai: ศรีสิทธิธงไชย; RTGS: Si Sitthi Thongchai; 16 October 1857 – 11 March 1910) was a Prince of Siam. As a son of King Mongkut and Chao Chom Manda Bua, he was a member of Siamese royal family.

His mother was a daughter of Chao Phraya Nakhon Noi, a son of King Taksin. He was given full name as Phra Chao Borom Wong Ther Phra Ong Chao Srisiddhi Thongjaya Krom Khun Siridhaj Sangkas (Thai: พระเจ้าบรมวงศ์เธอ พระองค์เจ้าศรีสิทธิธงไชย กรมขุนสิริธัชสังกาศ).

He had 4 siblings: 1 elder brother, 1 younger sister, and 2 younger brothers:

1. Prince Chalermlaksanaloet
2. Princess Oradaya Debkanya
3. Prince Vadhananuwongse
4. Prince Damrongrit

He was the minister of Finance from 1894 to 1896.
