= Jayanta Mongkol =

- Prince Mahisara Rajaharudaya
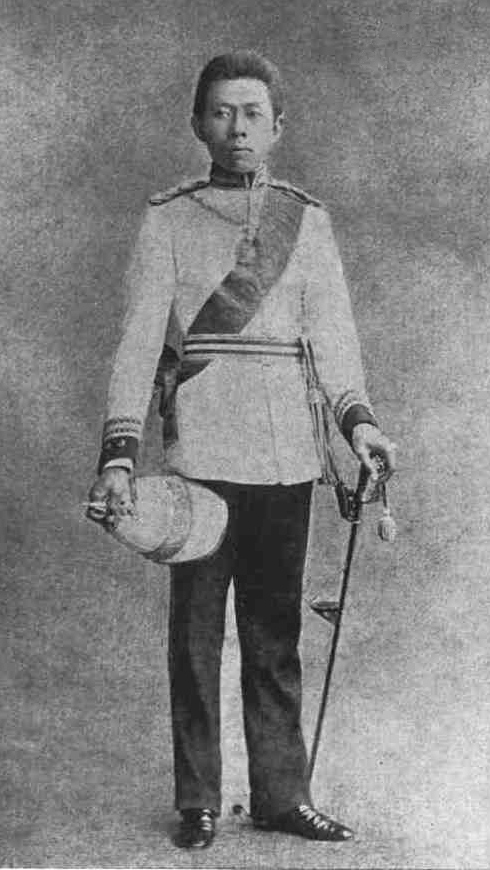
- Born: 30 January 1866; Bangkok, Siam
- Died: 15 April 1907 (aged 41); Bangkok, Siam
- Spouse: Suphangphak Charunrot; Noi Yuktasevwi; Klip Chukawirot; Hia Yuktasewi; Suan Yuktasewi
- Issue: 13 sons and daughters
- House: Jayanta (Chakri dynasty)
- Father: Mongkut (Rama IV)
- Mother: Concubine Huang

Minister of Royal Treasury
- In office 26 August 1896 – 1 June 1906
- Preceded by: Srisiddhi Thongjaya
- Succeeded by: Koed Bunnag

Jayanta Mongkol, the Prince Mahisara Rajaharudaya (Thai: พระองค์เจ้าไชยันตมงคล กรมหมื่นมหิศรราชหฤทัย; RTGS: Phra-ongchao Chaiyantamongkhon Krommamuen Mahisonratchaharuethai; 30 January 1866 – 15 April 1907) was a son of King Mongkut, Rama IV, and his Royal Consort Huang. He was 13 years younger than his brother, Chulalongkorn, who would become Rama V. The prince was a leading member of the progressive clique known as the "Young Siam", on whom King Chulalongkorn relied for support in his efforts to reform the country. At the king's insistence, the younger members of his family and extended family were all educated in Western ways, sometimes attending schools abroad.

== Biography ==
Prince Jayanta began his public career with the Royal Guard and was later transferred to a civilian post in the Bureau of the Royal Secretariat. In 1895, Prince Jayanta was given the royal title Prince Mahisara Rajaharudaya, and was promoted to a very high position in the Siamese court. There was a major shuffle of ministerial posts, with eight of the 12 minister positions going to members of the Young Siam. In 1896 the Prince was put in charge of the Ministry of Treasury (later Finance Ministry), which had recently absorbed the Ministry of Agriculture. In 1897, when HM King Rama V embarked on a nine-month tour of Europe, Prince Jayanta, as the Minister of Treasury, accompanied him and saw first-hand the government administration of several European states, and the important role banks played in developing the economy and promoting international trade.

Upon returning home, the Prince assumed the task of developing international trade relations and bringing Siam's business practices in line with those in Europe. There was certainly a great need for an indigenous bank but the Prince realised that founding a bank would take time and expertise, while at the same time, there would be resistance from the established foreign banking community. The Prince also turned his attention to further reforming the awkward pod duang currency into a European-style metric system, involving just two units (1 baht equivalent to 100 satang). The reform made bookkeeping much easier and paved the way for the introduction of Siamese banknotes in 1902. Having succeeded with his currency reforms, Prince Jayanta went on to launch a small Siamese-owned private trust in 1904 called the Book Club. Three years later, this trust was the foundation for Siam's first commercial bank, Siam Commercial Bank, Limited, which was launched under a royal charter on the Prince's birthday, 30 January, in 1907. Because of his achievements, he is widely acknowledged as the 'Father of Thai Banking'.

== Honours ==
=== National honours ===
- Knight of the Most Illustrious Order of the Royal House of Chakri (1892)
- Knight Grand Cross (First Class) of the Most Illustrious Order of Chula Chom Klao (1893)
- Knight Grand Cross (First Class) of the Most Exalted Order of the White Elephant (1893)
- Knight Grand Cross (First Class) of the Most Noble Order of the Crown of Thailand (1891)
- Knight Grand Commander (Second Class, upper grade) of the Most Illustrious Order of Chula Chom Klao (1887)
- Knight Commander (Second Class) of the Most Exalted Order of the White Elephant (1892)
- Knight Commander (Second Class) of the Most Noble Order of the Crown of Thailand (1890)
- Dushdi Mala Medal (1893)
- King Rama IV Royal Cypher Medal, 3rd Class (1904)
- King Rama V Royal Cypher Medal, 1st Class (1901)

=== Foreign honours ===
- Kingdom of Italy:
  - Knight Grand Cross of the Order of Saints Maurice and Lazarus (1896)

== Literature ==
- Century of Growth: The First 100 years of Siam Commercial Bank. Singapore: Editions Didier Millet, 2007.
