= Joseph Caulfield James =

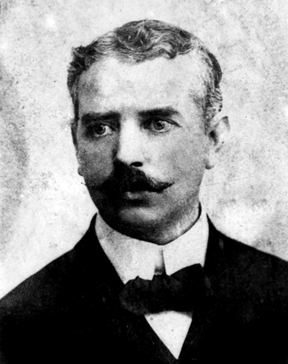
Joseph Caulfeild James

Joseph Caulfeild James (6 July 1860 – 6 July 1925) was an English teacher from Birkenhead, England. He was the principal tutor to Prince Vajiravudh of Siam, who later became king of Siam.

== Royal tutor ==
Caulfeild James, an Englishman of Irish descent, arrived in Bangkok in 1887 for a position teaching English at Assumption College. After a short period there, he was engaged inside the Grand Palace as the full-time English tutor to three princes; Prince Vajiravudh, Prince Chakrabongse Bhuvanath and Prince Nandiyavat Svasti.

Caulfeild James accompanied Prince Nandiyavat Svasti to Europe. For some years, James continued to be one of the tutors in the Grand Palace, and in 1898, he was appointed headmaster of the Rajakumari College inside the Grand Palace.

== Royal Bangkok Sports Club ==
After leaving his royal duties Caulfield James became Honorary Secretary of the Bangkok Docking Club. In 1901, the Bangkok Docking Club developed into the present-day Royal Bangkok Sports Club. With the help of Caulfeild James, the Royal Bangkok Sports Club emerged from being a purely horse-racing club to the broader sporting club that it is to this day. He eventually became Chairman and then Honorary Vice President of the club in 1912 to 1915.
