= Nandiyavat Svastivatana =

Nanyadivat Svastivatana
- Mom Chao (Thai: หม่อมเจ้า)
- Born: 25 April 1909; Bangkok, Siam
- Died: 18 October 1958 (aged 49); Bangkok, Thailand
- Spouse: Suvabavabraobarn Vudhijaya
- Issue: M. R. Suvananda Svastivatana; M. R. Rambi Abha Svastivatana; M. R. Vudhisavat Svastivatana; M. R. Sudanan Svastivatana; M. R. Phera Barni Svastivatana
Names
- Nonyadivat Svastivatana
- Thai: นนทิยาวัด สวัสดิวัตน์
- House: Svastivatana family (Chakri Dynasty)
- Father: Prince Svasti Sobhana, the Prince Svastivatana Visishtha
- Mother: Abha Barni

Prince Nandiyavat Svastivatana (also known as Nandiyavat Svasti) was a member of the Thai Royal Family and grandson to King Rama IV.

== Education ==
As a young man, Prince Nandiyavat graduated from Worcester Academy, Worcester, Massachusetts in 1927.

== Political careers ==
Prince Nandiyavat Svastivatana was appointed Deputy Minister of Foreign Affairs in the government of Prime Minister Thawan Thamrongnawasawat.
