= Gagananga Yukala =

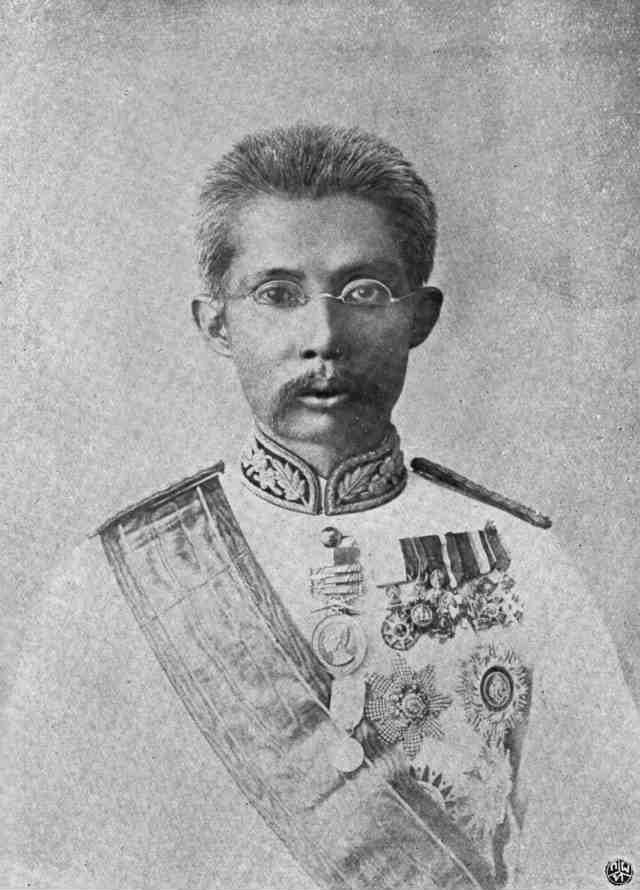

1st Director General of the Supreme Court of Thailand
- In office 1885–1889
- Monarch: Chulalongkorn
- Preceded by: Office Established
- Succeeded by: Srisiddhi Thongjaya

Personal details
- Born: October 29, 1855 Bangkok, Siam
- Died: March 11, 1909 (aged 53) Bangkok, Siam
- Spouses: Sun Gagananga na Ayudhya; Sumittra na Chiengmai
- Children: Princess Aphaphanni; Princess Klang; Princess Chawiwilai; Prince Noi; Prince Klang; Prince Pridiyakon
- Parent(s): Mongkut (Rama IV); Phueng Indravimala
- Relatives: Chakri Dynasty

Gagananga Yukala, the Prince Bijitprijakara (Thai: คัคณางค์ยุคล; RTGS: Khakkhanang Yukhon) was a prince of Siam (later Thailand). He was a member of Siamese royal family and was a son of King Mongkut and Phueng Indravimala

== Life ==
Prince Gangananga Yukala was born on 29 October 1855 in Bangkok Siam (later Thailand), and was a son of King Mongkut and Phueng Indravimala. He served as the second Minister of Justice of Siam from 1894 to 1896. Prince Gangananga Yukala died on 13 March 1909 at the age 53.

== Thai royal decoration ==
- Knight Grand Cordon with Chain of the Order of the Royal House of Chakri
- The Ancient and Auspicious of Order of the Nine Gems
- Knight Grand Cross (First Class) of The Most Illustrious Order of Chula Chom Klao
- King Rama IV Royal Cypher Medal (First Class)
- Chakrabarti Mala Medal (ร.จ.พ.)

Gagananga Yukala House of Gagananga Cadet branch of the House of Chakri Born: 29 October 1855 Died: 11 March 1909
Political offices
Preceded by Svasti Sobhana	Minister of Justice; 1894–1896	Succeeded by Raphi Phatthanasak
Legal offices
First	Director-general of the Supreme Court of Siam; 1885	Vacant Title next held by Srisiddhi Thongjaya
