= Narisara Nuwattiwong =

Chitcharoen จิตรเจริญ
- Prince Narisara Nuwattiwong
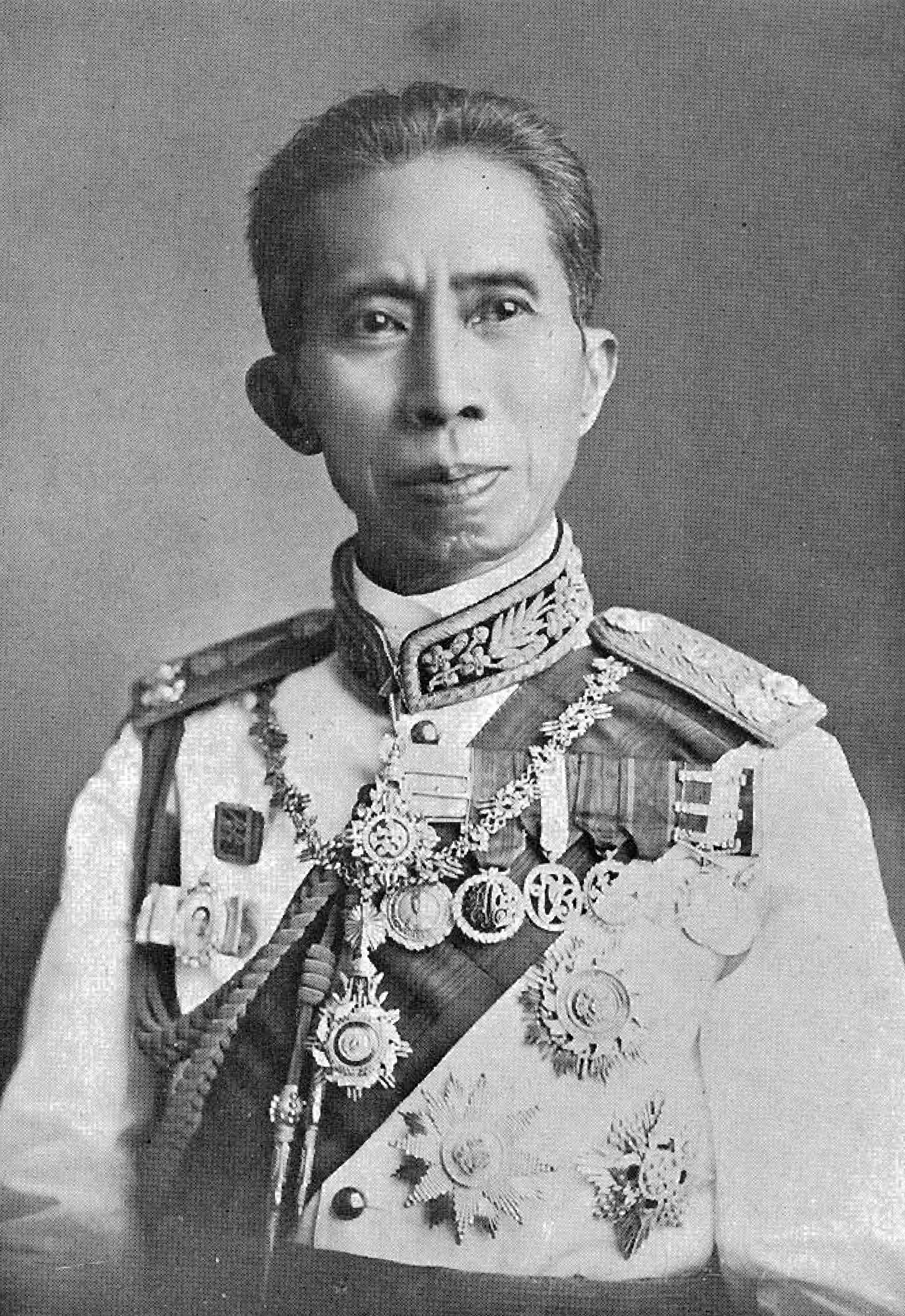
- Born: 28 April 1863; Grand Palace, Phra Nakhon, Bangkok, Siam
- Died: 10 March 1947 (aged 83); Bangkok, Siam
- Spouse: Ratchawong Pluem Siriwong; Malai Sewatam; Ratchawong To Ngon-rot
- Issue: 9 sons and daughters: Mom Chao Pluemchit Chittraphong; Mom Chao Ai; Mom Chao Charoenchai; Mom Chao Sam; Mom Chao Pralomchit; Mom Chao Duangchit; Mom Chao Yachai; Mom Chao Phlao-rot; Mom Chao Konnika
- House: Chitrabhongse (Chakri)
- Father: Mongkut (Rama IV)
- Mother: Phannarai (Chae Siriwong)

Minister of Royal Treasury
- In office 21 March 1892 – 23 December 1894
- Preceded by: Chaturonrasmi
- Succeeded by: Srisiddhi Thongjaya

Minister of Defence
- In office 1894–1899
- Preceded by: Phum Srichaiyant
- Succeeded by: Thongkhongkonhyai

Chief of the Joint Operations Department
- In office 1896–1899
- Preceded by: Bhanurangsi Savangwongse
- Succeeded by: Bhanurangsi Savangwongse

Commander of the Navy Department
- In office 1898–1899
- Preceded by: Kachornchratwongse
- Succeeded by: Prachak Silapakhom

Prince Chitcharoen, the Prince Narisara Nuwattiwong (Thai: นริศรานุวัดติวงศ์ RTGS: Naritsaranuwattiwong; 28 April 1863 – 10 March 1947), Prince Naris (นริศ) for short, né Chitcharoen (จิตรเจริญ), was a member of the royal family of Siam (now Thailand), minister, general and scholar. A polymath, he became known as "the great craftsman of Siam" and "the prince master". The anniversary of his birth, 28 April, is celebrated in Thailand as "Prince Naris Day".

== Early life ==
Prince Narisara Nuwattiwong was born on 28 April 1863 in Bangkok, Thailand. He was the son of Pannarai and King Rama IV (also known as King Mongkut). Prince Nuwattiwong was educated by Western missionaries who encouraged his interest in the fine arts.

== Career ==
=== Government ===
Prince Narisara Nuwattiwong was appointed the Director of Public Works, Town and Country Planning for the Ministry of the Interior. He worked on Thailand's early urban planning and became an Art Advisor for the Royal Institute of Thailand. His other jobs included working for the Ministry of the Treasury, the Ministry of War, and the Ministry of the Palace. From 1892 to 1894, he served as Minister of the Treasury.

From 1894 to 1899, he was the Minister of War. During his tenure, the former Kalahom department (dating back to the 15th century) was radically modernised based on Western models. From 1896 to 1899, Prince Naris—who was both a general of the army and an admiral—additionally held the position of the Commander of the Department of Military Operation, the highest military position in the Siamese Army of that time. From 1898 to 1899 he was also the Commander of the Navy Department and therefore commanding officer of the Siamese Navy.

Prince Naris served as Regent of Siam from 1934 to 1935, substituting for his nephew King Prajadhipok (Rama VII) who resided in England during the treatment of an eye condition. After Prajadhipok's definite abdication in 1935 and the choice of 9-year-old Ananda Mahidol as the new king, Naris declined the request to continue as regent, pointing to his old age.

=== Design ===
When Prince Naris began his art endeavours, there was no Siamese concept of design. Thailand had no art museum, and the arts were not taught at universities. Prince Naris worked with Siamese craftsmen and Italian artists on royal commissions to create Siamese "art".

As Thailand began to modernize, it created its first European-style government ministries. Narisara was assigned to design the crest for these newly created ministries. Each crest he designed was different, representing the role of each group.

==== Architecture ====
Wat Benchamabophit (the Marble Temple) was the first temple in Thailand to use marble in its construction. This temple has been described as a defining example of a modern Buddhist temple by the Western Ministries of Architecture.

The Wat Benchamabophit School is next to Wat Benjamabophit. Unlike the temple, the school was built in Western style. Phraubosotwatrachativas is another temple made of marble, but the style of this building combines Western and Thai styles. The temple contains oil paintings that were inspired by art found in Western medieval churches.

==== Music ====
- "Sansoen Phra Barami" or Royal Anthem
- "Khamen Sai Yok"

== Family ==
Prince Naris was married three times. His first wife was Mom Rajawongse Pluem Sirivongse (หม่อมราชวงศ์ปลื้ม ศิริวงศ์), with whom he had one daughter:

- Princess Pluemchit Chitrabongse (หม่อมเจ้าปลื้มจิต จิตรพงศ์)

After the death of his first wife, Prince Naris married Mom Malai Chitrabongse Na Ayudhaya (née Sewatam) (หม่อมมาลัย เศวตามร์), with whom he had two sons:

- Prince Ai Chitrabongse (หม่อมเจ้าอ้าย จิตรพงศ์)
- Prince Charoenchai Chitrabongse (หม่อมเจ้าเจริญใจ จิตรพงศ์)

After the death of his second wife, the prince remarried one last time, marrying Mom Rajawongse To Ngon-rot (หม่อมราชวงศ์โต งอนรถ). They had a total of six children, of whom five were male:

- Prince Sam Chitrabongse (หม่อมเจ้าสาม จิตรพงศ์)
- Princess Pralomchit Chitrabongse (หม่อมเจ้าประโลมจิตร จิตรพงศ์)
- Princess Duangchit Chitrabongse (หม่อมเจ้าดวงจิตร จิตรพงศ์)
- Prince Yachai Chitrabongse (หม่อมเจ้ายาใจ จิตรพงศ์)
- Prince Phlao-rot Chitrabongse (หม่อมเจ้าเพลารถ จิตรพงศ์)
- Princess Konnika Chitrabongse (หม่อมเจ้าหญิงกรณิกา จิตรพงศ์)

== Death ==
Naris died on 10 March 1947 from a stroke. His funeral was held publicly at Sanam Luang. His cremation pyre was similar to the royal funeral pyre of Ananda Mahidol.

== Honours ==
National honours

- Knight of the Order of the Royal House of Chakri
- Knight of the Order of the Nine Gems
- Knight Grand Cordon of the Order of Chula Chom Klao
- Knight of the Ratana Varabhorn Order of Merit
- Knight Grand Cordon of the Order of the White Elephant
- Knight Grand Cordon of the Order of the Crown of Thailand
- Dushdi Mala Medal Pin of Services to the Monarch (Military)
- Dushdi Mala Medal Pin of Arts and Science (Military)
- Chakra Mala Medal
- Saradul Mala Medal
- King Rama IV Royal Cypher Medal, 2nd Class
- King Rama V Royal Cypher Medal, 1st Class
- King Rama VI Royal Cypher Medal, 1st Class
- King Rama VII Royal Cypher Medal, 1st Class
- King Rama VIII Royal Cypher Medal, 1st Class
- Rajini Medal

Foreign Honours

- Knight Grand Cross of the Order of the Crown of Italy

Narisara Nuwattiwong House of Chitrabhongse Cadet branch of the House of Chakri Born: 28 April 1863 Died: 10 March 1947
Military offices
Preceded by Prabporapak	Commander of the Navy Department; 1898 – 1899	Succeeded by Prachaksinlapakhom
Preceded by Bhanubandhu Vongsevoradej	Chief of the Joint Operations Department; 1896 – 1899	Succeeded by Chirapravati Voradej
Political offices
Preceded by Chakkrabatradipongse	Minister of Treasury; 1892 – 1894	Succeeded by Siridhaj Sangkas
Preceded by Rattanathibes	Minister of Defence; 1894 – 1899	Succeeded by Prachaksinlapakhom
