= Rambai Barni =

Queen of Siam from 1925 to 1935

Rambai Barni; รำไพพรรณี
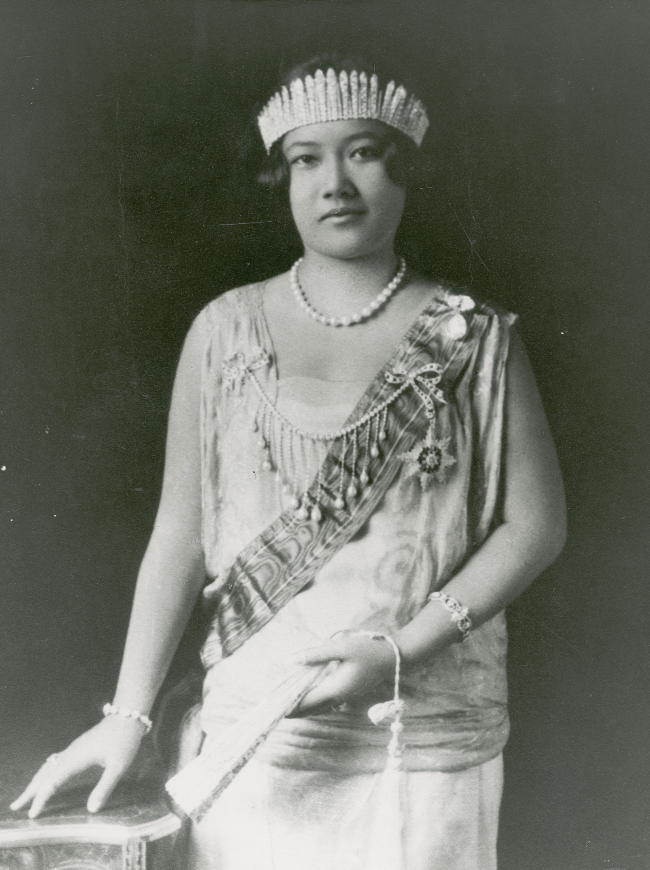
- Queen Rambai Barni in 1926

Queen consort of Siam
- Tenure: 25 November 1925 – 2 March 1935
- Coronation: 25 February 1926
- Born: Rambai Barni Svastivatana; 20 December 1904; Bangkok, Siam
- Died: 22 May 1984 (aged 79); Bangkok, Thailand
- Burial: 9 April 1985; Sanam Luang, Bangkok
- Spouse: Prajadhipok (Rama VII) (m. 1918; died 1941)
- House: Svastivatana
- Dynasty: Chakri
- Father: Svasti Sobhana
- Mother: Abha Barni Gagananga
- Religion: Theravada Buddhism

Rambai Barni (Thai: รำไพพรรณี, RTGS: Ramphaiphanni, pronounced [rām.pʰāj.pʰān.nīː]), formerly Rambai Barni Svastivatana (Thai: รำไพพรรณี สวัสดิวัตน์, RTGS: Ramphaiphanni Sawatdiwat; born 20 December 1904 – 22 May 1984), was Queen of Siam as the wife of King Prajadhipok of Siam.

== Early life ==
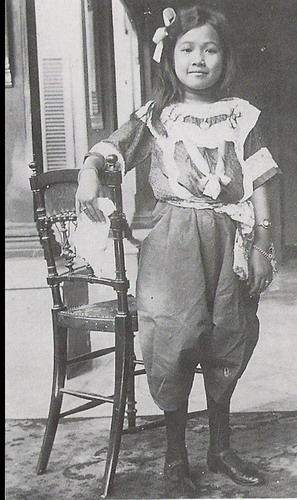
Rambai Barni as a child

Princess Rambai Barni Svastivatana was born on 20 December 1904, to Prince Svasti Sobhana, the Prince of Svastivatana Visishta (a son of King Mongkut and Princess Piyamavadi) and Princess Abha Barni Gaganang. She was given the nickname Thanying Na (Princess Na, Thai: ท่านหญิงนา). At the age of two, she began to receive education from her aunt Queen Saovabha Phongsri at Dusit Palace.

After the death of King Chulalongkorn in 1910, she was moved to the Grand Palace, where she studied at the Rajini School (or Queen's School) set up by Queen Saovabha. During this period she became very close to her cousin, Queen Saovabha's youngest son, Prince Prajadhipok Sakdidej, the Prince of Sukhothai. In 1917, after completing his studies abroad and the customary period of monasticism, Prince Prajadhipok and Princess Rambai Barni were married at Bang Pa-In Palace and given the blessings of her new brother-in-law, King Vajiravudh. The couple lived at the prince's Bangkok residence, Sukhothai Palace.

== Queen ==
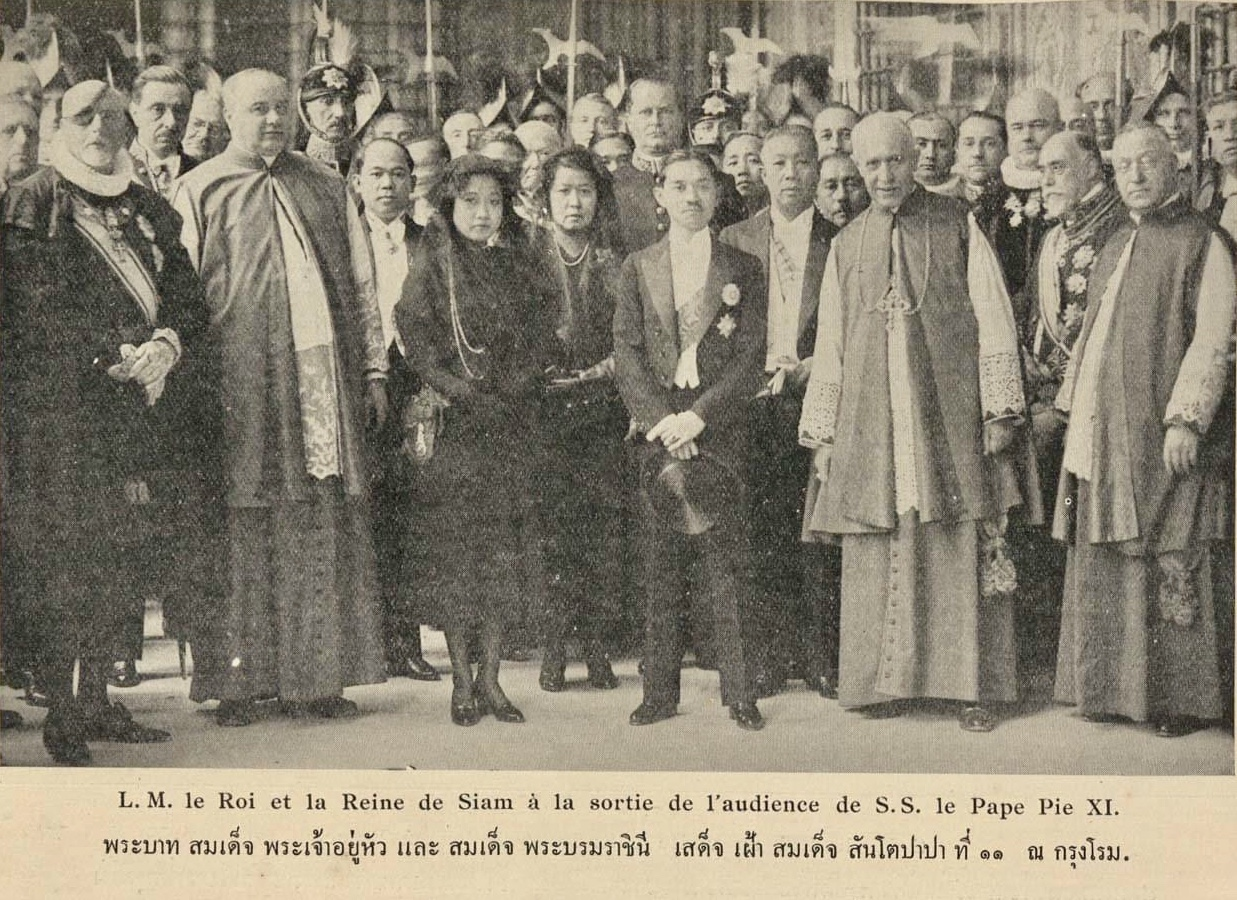
King Rama VII and Queen Rambhai Barni after an audience with Pope Pius XI at Vatican City, 1934

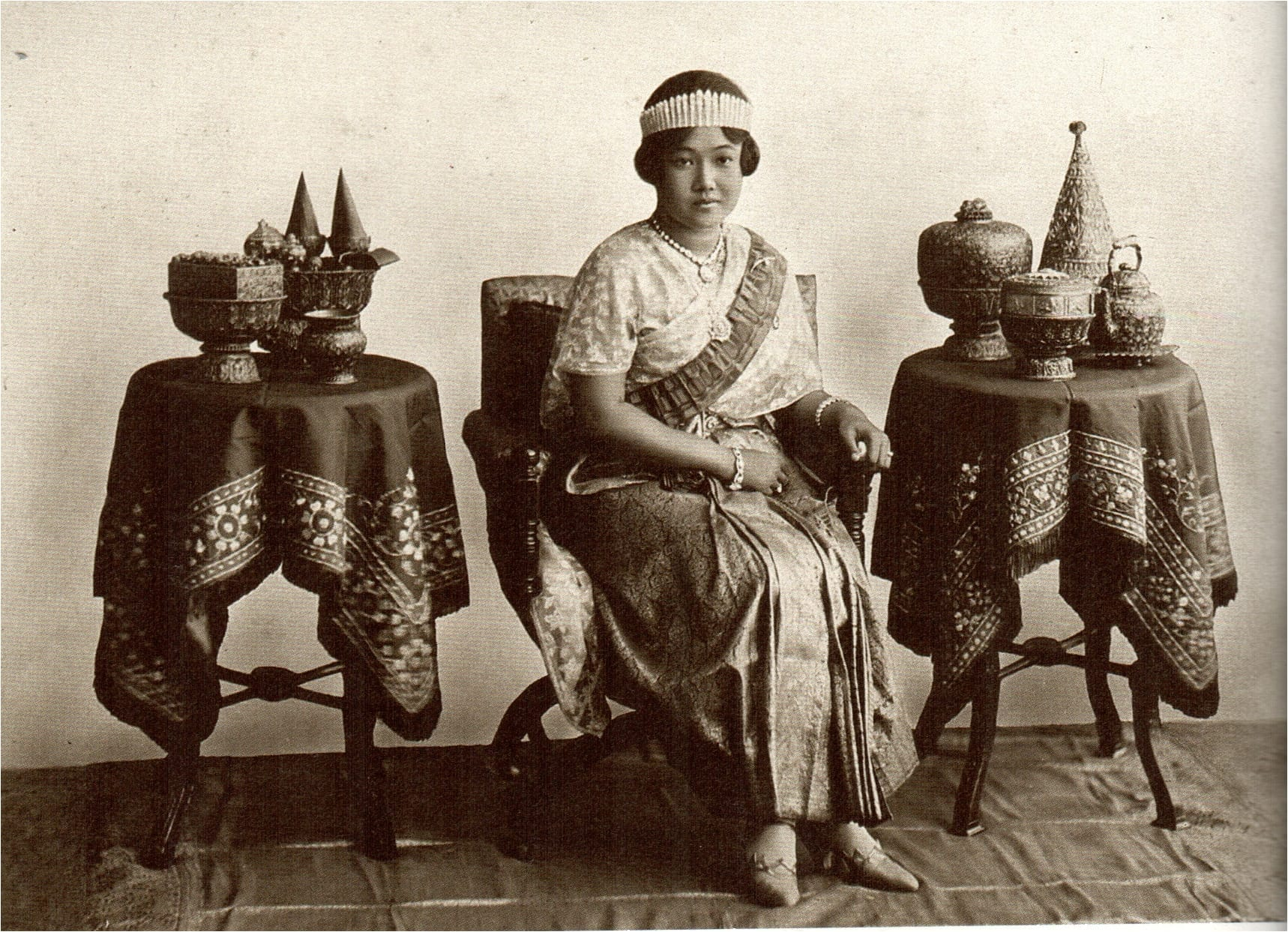
Queen Rambai Barni of Siam in 1925

In 1925, King Vajiravudh died without leaving any male issue (his only daughter, Princess Bejaratana Rajasuda, was born a day earlier and palace law dictated that the throne must pass to the next male full-sibling of the king). The crown was then passed on to his younger brother and heir. Princess Rambai Barni's husband ascended the throne as King Prajadhipok (or Rama VII), she was immediately invested with title of Queen Consort of Siam after her husband's own coronation ceremony. Prajadhipok followed his brother's abandonment of polygamy and instead had one queen. Both the king and queen received modern European educations in their youth. Once they inherited the throne they set about modernizing the institution of monarchy, copying European dress and customs.

The king and queen spent most of their time away from Bangkok, preferring instead to stay at the beach resort town of Hua Hin in Prachuap Khiri Khan Province at a palace called Klai Kangwon (Thai: วังไกลกังวล) (or "far from worries"), which they had built. It was here in June 1932 that the royal couple was told of the revolution instigated by the Khana Ratsadon, which demanded of the absolutist king a constitution for the people of Siam. The event would be a turning point for Rambai Barni and her husband, as the absolute rule of the House of Chakri was replaced by a constitutional regime.

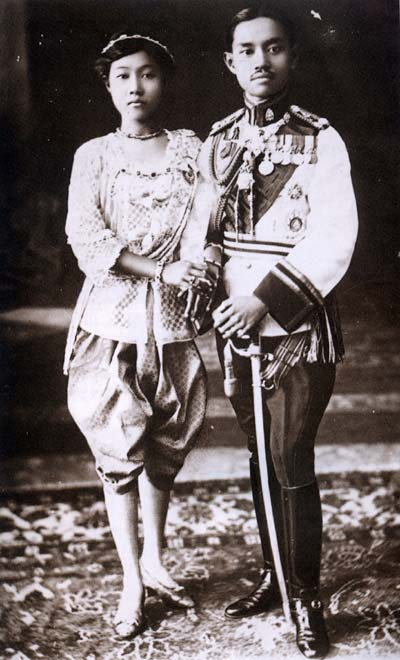
The Queen and her husband, King Prajadhipok (Rama VII)

In the early stages of the constitutional monarchy, the King and the royalists seemed to be able to compromise with Khana Ratsadon. The constitutional bill which was drafted by Pridi Banomyong and intended to be a permanent one was made temporary. The new constitution restored some of the monarch's lost power and status. Among them were introduction of unelected half of the House of Representatives and royal veto power. The country's first prime minister Phraya Manopakorn Nititada was a conservative and royalist nobleman.

The compromise broke down quickly. He did not contest when his interpretation of Pridi's economic plan, which also aim on land reform and seizure of royal land, was released with his signature. The King played a role in the coup d'état of April 1933 where the House was ordered to close by the Prime Minister. He signed an order to execute Khana Ratsadon leaders. But Khana Ratsadon's military wing leader Phraya Phahol Phonphayuhasena ousted the government and restored its power.

He played an active role in an anti-revolutionary network, which also aim to assassinate Khana Ratsadon's leaders.

In October 1933, the maverick Prince Boworadej, a former minister of defence, led an armed revolt against the government. In the Boworadet Rebellion, he mobilised several provincial garrisons and marched on Bangkok, occupying the Don Muang aerodrome. Prince Boworadej accused the government of being disrespectful to the monarch and of promoting communism, and demanded that government leaders resign. The rebellion ultimately failed.

The King did not directly supported the rebellion, but there was a check from the treasury to Boworadej. The insurrection diminished the king's prestige. When the revolt began, Prajadhipok immediately informed the government that he regretted the strife and civil disturbances. The royal couple then took refuge at Songkhla, in the far south. The king's withdrawal from the scene was interpreted by the Khana Ratsadorn as a failure to do his duty. By not throwing his full support behind government forces, he had undermined their trust in him.

In 1933, the couple left Siam for Europe where the king was due to have an eye operation in England. Despite the long distance the king continued to fight with his government back in Bangkok, through letters and telegrams. The fight came to a head when the government refused to accept Prajadhipok's ancient power of pardon. The king first threatened, but when he was ignored, decided to abdicate his throne on 2 March 1935. He was succeeded by his nephew Ananda Mahidol. The couple settled in Surrey, first at Knowle House, then at Glen Pammant.

== Life in exile ==
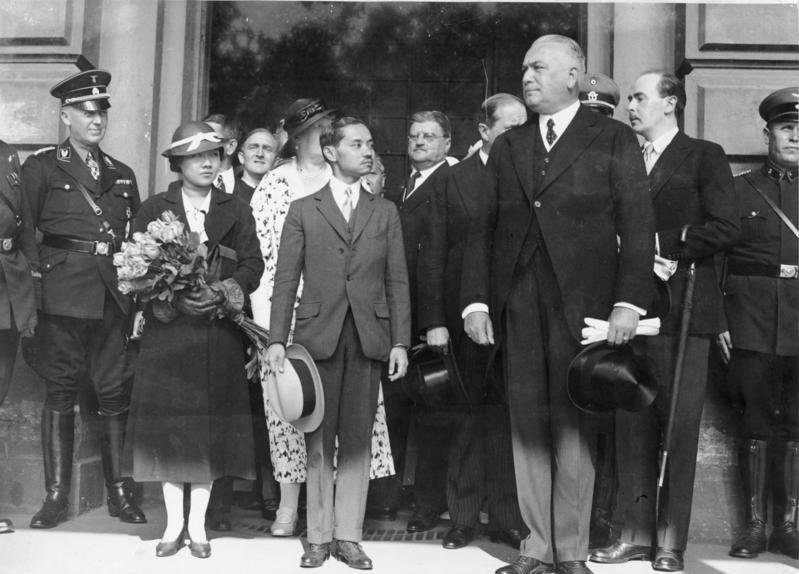
King Rama VII and Queen Rambai Barni in Berlin.

The couple moved again to Vane Court, the oldest house in the village of Biddenden in Kent. They led a peaceful life there, gardening in the morning and the king writing his autobiography in the afternoon. In 1938 the royal couple moved again to Compton House, in the village of Wentworth in Virginia Water, Surrey. The couple had no children, but adopted the infant son of one of Prajadhipok's deceased brothers. (The stepson, Prince Jirasakdi, would later serve as a RAF fighter pilot during the Battle of Britain. He died on duty in 1942.)

Due to active bombing by the German Luftwaffe in 1940, the couple again moved, first to a small house in Devon, and then to Lake Vyrnwy Hotel in Powys, Wales, where the former king suffered a heart attack. King Prajadhipok eventually died from heart failure on 30 May 1941.

== Leader of the resistance ==
After the King's death, the queen became more involved in politics. In December 1941 the Japanese Empire invaded and occupied Thailand. The Japanese government forced the Thai government to declare war on both the United Kingdom and the United States. Regent Pridi Banomyong built the anti-Japanese underground, the Free Thai Movement ("Seri Thai") network, in Thailand. The Free Thai Movement was set up partially by Thai exiles living abroad. The movement included many diplomats, students, and members of the royal family.

The queen and her brother, Prince Subhasvastiwongse Snith Svastivatana, made clear their Free Thai sympathies and used their connections to assist like-minded students in organising a resistance movement in the UK. She was among the four women who volunteered for non-military tasks with the Free Thai. Despite not being an official member, the queen assisted the movement through fund raising and lobbying influential ministers.

== Return and death ==
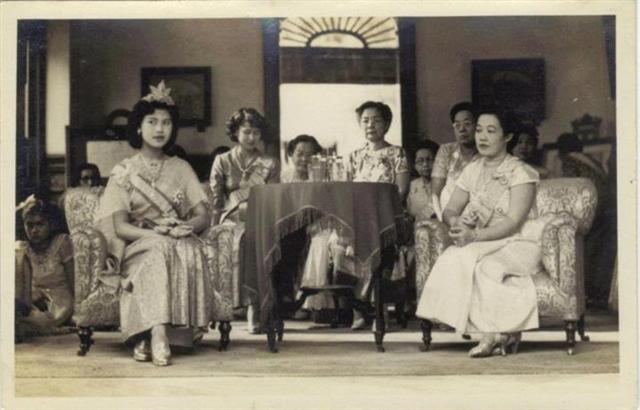
Queen Sirikit (Far left), Princess Galyani Vadhana (center), Princess Hemvadi, Princess Adisaya Suriyabha, Princess Adorn Dibyanibha and Queen Rambhai Barni (right) in 1950

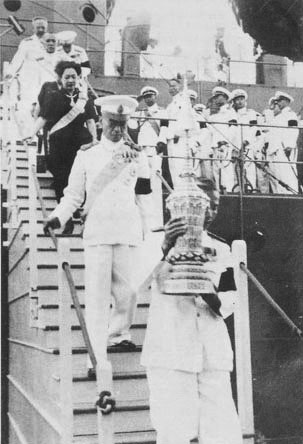
Queen Rambhai Barni bringing King Prajadhipok's ashes back to Thailand, 1949

On the morning of 9 June 1946, the young King Ananda Mahidol was found dead in his bed in the Baromphiman Mansion in the Grand Palace, dead from a gunshot wound to his head. In October 1946, a commission ruled that the King's death could not have been accidental, but that neither suicide nor murder was satisfactorily proved. Sulak Sivaraksa, a prominent conservative and monarchist, wrote that Pridi's role in the event was he protected responsible royals, and prevented the arrest of a person who destroyed the evidence. However, when his government cannot solve the case, his political opponents quickly put the blame on him; some went so far as to branding him as the mastermind behind the assassination.

Pridi's opponents composed of royalist, conservative and military camps. On 8 November 1947, army troops seized various government installations in Bangkok. The coup, led by Lieutenant General Phin Choonhavan and Colonel Kat Katsongkhram, ousted Thamrong's government, which is the political ally of Pridi. He spent a week hiding in Admiral Sindhu Songkhramchai's headquarters. On 20 November, he was spirited to Singapore by British and US agents. The 1947 coup marked the return to power of Field Marshal Plaek Phibunsongkhram, and the end of Khana Ratsadon's role in Thai politics. (At this time, Phibun was often considered in the military camp.)

In 1948, the royalist government made a law that increase the power to control the Crown Property by the monarch as the restoration of their political power and assets, which was taken to the state property by the People Party from the Siamese revolution of 1932. Additionally, former Queen Rambai Barni was returned the 6 million baht that the People Party seized.

The coup inadvertently led to the draft and signing of the 1947 Constitution and 1949 Constitution. The most Royalist constitutions to date, it gave the monarchy back almost all of the powers that were taken away from it by the 1932 Revolution. They were similar to the constitution draft by King Prajadhipok before the 1932.

In 1949, the queen was invited to return to Thailand, bringing with her the king's ashes. After her return she continued to carry out many official duties on behalf of the new king, Bhumibol Adulyadej. She spent the rest of her life at Sukhothai Palace, dying in 1984 at the age of 79. She was cremated in a grand royal funeral presided over by her nephew the king at Sanam Luang in front of the Grand Palace.

== Taxon named in her honor ==
Mugilogobius rambaiae is named in honor of Her Majesty Rambai Barni (1904-1984), the former Queen of Siam; As an interesting aside, in 1934 a water-color painting showing several life-size renderings of this goby in its natural habitat was given to her majesty.

Rambai Barni House of Svastivatana Cadet branch of the House of Chakri Born: 20 December 1904 Died: 22 May 1984
Thai royalty
| Vacant Title last held by Praphai Sucharitakul | Queen consort of Siam; 1925–1935 | Vacant Title next held by Sirikit Kitiyakara |
