= Svasti Sobhana =

Siamese prince, first Minister of Justice

- Prince Svastivatana Visishtha
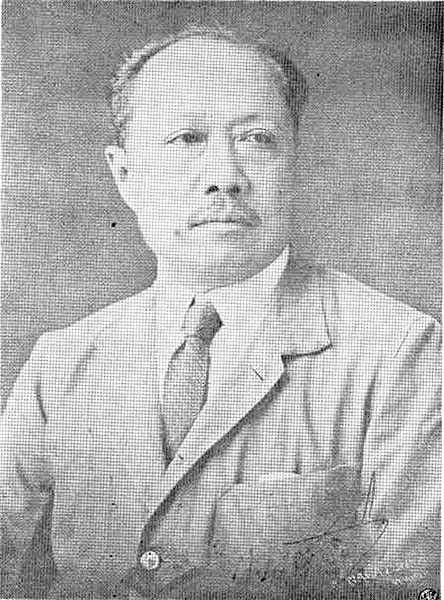
- Born: 22 December 1865; Bangkok, Siam
- Died: December 10, 1935 (aged 69); Penang, Strait Settlements
- Spouse: Aphaphanni Khakkhanang; Chawiwilai Khakkhanang; Lamun Phisanlayabut; Hun Phisanlayabut; Si Phisanlayabut; Sa-ngiam Sanidwongs; Sutchai; Re Bunnak; Lap Bunnak; Phong Bunyarattaphan
- Issue: 48, including Rambai Barni
Names
- Svastivatana Visihta
- House: Svastivatana (Chakri dynasty)
- Father: Mongkut (Rama IV)
- Mother: Piam Sucharitakul

Prince Svasti Sobhana, the Prince Svastivatana Visishtha (Note: The Prince's name was Svasti Sobhana. He held the rank and title of Somdet Krommaphra Svastivatana Visishtha.) (Thai: สมเด็จพระเจ้าบรมวงศ์เธอ พระองค์เจ้าสวัสดิโสภณ กรมพระสวัสดิวัดนวิศิษฎ์, RTGS: Somdet Phrachao Borommawongthoe Phra-ongchao Sawatdisophon Krommaphra Sawatdiwat Wisit; 22 December 1865 – 10 December 1935) was a son of King Mongkut (Rama IV) and Princess Consort Piam. As the sixtieth child of King Mongkut, he also had the same parents as the 3 queens of King Chulalongkorn, Queen Sunandha Kumariratana, Queen Savang Vadhana and Queen Saovabha Bhongsi. He was the father of Queen Rambai Barni.

He was educated at Balliol College, Oxford and later became the first Minister of Justice of Siam.

== Honours ==
- Grand Cross of the Order of the Dannebrog, 31 July 1894 (Denmark)
- Grand Cordon of the Royal Order of Leopold, 1897 (Belgium)
- Grand Cross of the Royal Hungarian Order of St. Stephen, 1897 (Austria-Hungary)
- Knight of the Royal Order of the Seraphim, 14 July 1897 (Sweden-Norway)
- Knight of the Order of the Elephant, 25 July 1897 (Denmark)
- Grand Cross of the Albert Order, with Golden Star, 1897 (Kingdom of Saxony)
- Grand Cross of the Order of the Crown of Italy, 1898 (Kingdom of Italy)

== Notes ==
Svasti Sobhana House of Svastivatana Cadet branch of the House of Chakri Born: 22 December 1865 Died: 10 December 1935
Political offices
First	Minister of Justice; 1891–1894	Succeeded by Gagananga Yukala
Legal offices
Vacant Title last held by Srisiddhi Thongjaya	Director-general of the Supreme Court of Siam; 1912–1918	Succeeded by Chaophraya Mahithorn
