= List of children of Mongkut =

The following is a list of children of King Mongkut. He had 82 children, 39 sons and 43 daughters from 35 wives.

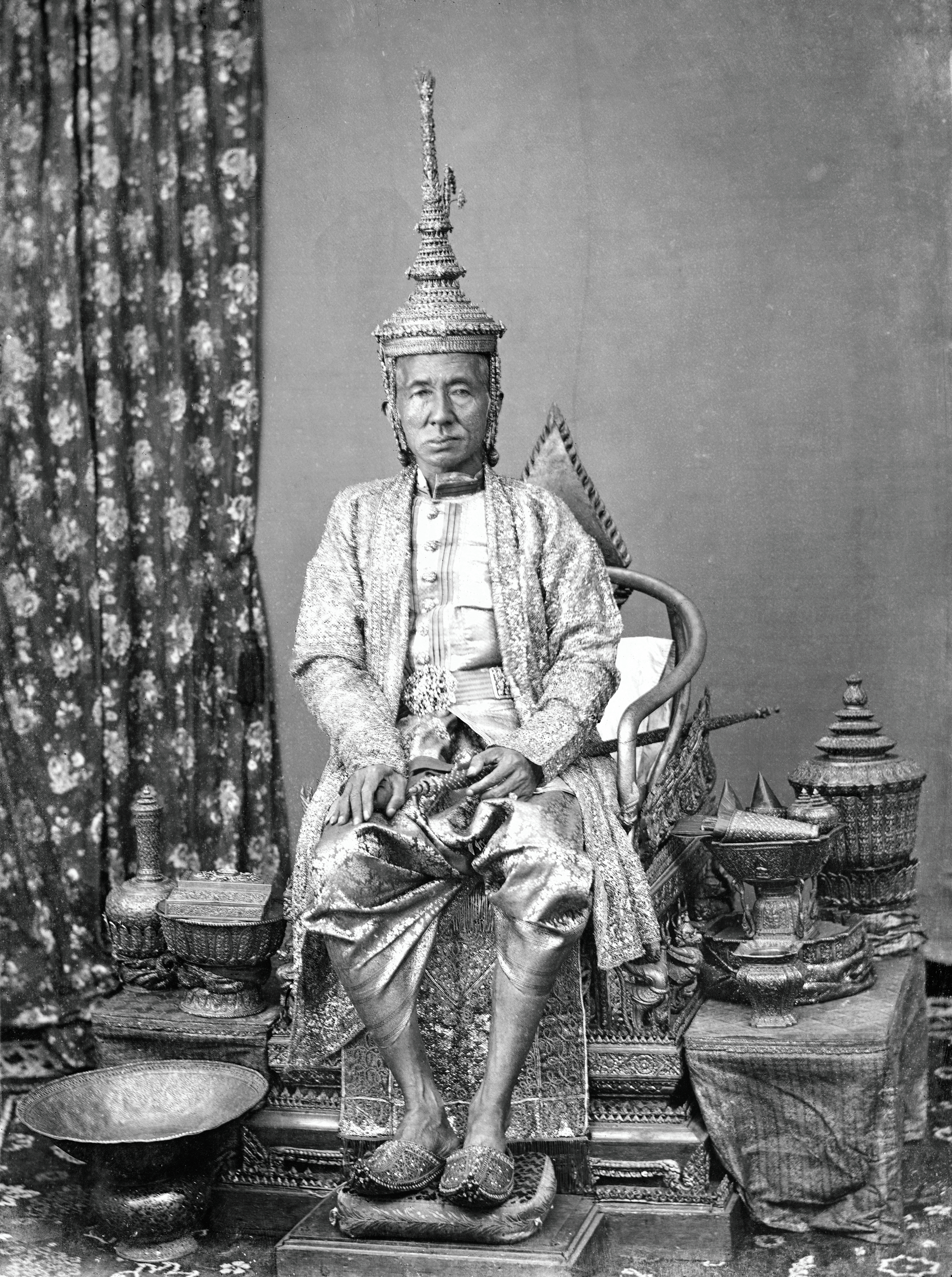
King Mongkut of Siam (1804–1868)

== Ancestry ==
Ancestors of List of children of Mongkut

8. (=14.) Thongdi, Prince Father of Siam
4. Rama I of Siam
9. (=15.) Yok
2. Rama II of Siam
10. Thong Na Bangxang
5. Nak Na Bangxang
11. Princess Rupsirisobhak Mahanagnari
1. Rama IV of Siam
6. Ngeon Sae-tan
3. Princess Bunrot of Siam
14. (=8.) Thongdi, Prince Father of Siam
7. Kaew, Princess Sri Sudarak
15. (=9.) Yok

Portrait	Name	Parents	Birth	Death
	King Mongkut มกุฎสมมติวงศ์	King Buddha Loetla Nabhalai; Princess Bunrot	18 October 1804	1 October 1868

== List of consorts ==
No.	Portrait	Name	Parents	Birth	Death	Children	Notes
Royal Consorts
1		Princess Somanass Waddhanawathy โสมนัสวัฒนาวดี	Prince Lakkhananukhun; Ngiu Suvarnadat	21 December 1834	10 October 1852	Somanass	
2		Princess Ramphoei Siriwong รำเพย ศิริวงศ์	Sirivonge, Prince Matayaphitaksa; Noi	17 July 1834	9 September 1862	Chulalongkorn; Chandrmondol; Chaturonrasmi; Bhanurangsi Savangwongse	
3		Princess Chae Siriwong แฉ่ ศิริวงศ์	Sirivonge, Prince Matayaphitaksa; Kim Sae-chio	9 May 1838	22 June 1914	Kannikakaew; Chitracharoen	
Royal Concubines
4		Noi น้อย	Prince Thadsaphai of Thonburi	24 October 1805		Nobavongse; Supratishtha	
5		Phae Dharmasaroja แพ ธรรมสโรช	Phra Samran Haruthai; Tao Songkandan		5 November 1861	Yingyaowalak; Bhaktra Bimalabarna; Kashemsanta Sobhaga; Manusyanagamanob; Banchob Benchama	
6		Tao Indravimala เต่า อินทรวิมล	Phraya Rajasongkram	1832	1890	Daksinavat; Gagananga Yukala; Jumbalasomboj	
7		Chan Suksathit จันทร์ สุขสถิต	Phraya Phiphit Sombat		24 February 1905	Daksinajar; Manyabhadhorn; Sukhasvasti; Kashemsri Subhayok	
8		Tieng Rojanadis เที่ยง โรจนดิศ	Phraya Abphantrikamat; Klay	27 December 1831	24 January 1913	Somavadi Srirattanarajadhida; Sawetra Voralap; Srinaga Svasti; Kamalasana Loesarga; Kanokvanna Lekha; Unnamed daughter; Jayanujit; Khaekhaiduang; Charun Ritdhidej; Puangsoi Sa-ang	
9		Talab Punyaratabandhu ตลับ บุณยรัตพันธุ์	Chao Phraya Phutharalai			Unnamed daughter; Dvithavalyalabh; Kap Kanok-rat	
10		Aiam เอี่ยม				Sri Phatthana	
11		Kes Svetasreni เกศ เศวตเศรณี	Luang Sundornkosa	1819	9 July 1915	Praphatson	
12		Princess Yeam (Cambojarajsudaduang) of Cambodia นักเยี่ยม (พระองค์เจ้ากำโพชราชสุดาดวง)	King Norodom of Cambodia; Nom	1851		None	
13		Princess Ploy of Cambodia นักพลอย	King Norodom of Cambodia			None	
14		Princess Safiah of Lingga ตนกูสุเบีย	Sultan Muhammed II Muazzam Shah of Riau-Lingga Sultanate; Tengku Kelsum Lebar Putih of Terengganu	1838	16 January 1894	None	
15		Sonklin Kashaseniya ซ่อนกลิ่น คชเสนี	Phraya Damrong Ratchapalakanta	1835	13 November 1925	Nares Varariddhi	
16		Khian Sirivanda เขียน สิริวันต์	On Sivanda	1842	14 April 1941	Narathip Praphanphong	
17		Chum Rodchanadisara ชุ่ม โรจนดิศ	Phraya Upphandarikamadaya	1844	1923	Damrong Rajanubhab	
18		Princess Piyamavadi Sri Bajarindra Mata (Piam Sucharitakul) สมเด็จพระปิยมาวดี ศรีพัชรินทรมาตา (เปี่ยม สุจริตกุล)	Lord Asa Samdaeng	1838	1904	Unakan Ananta Norajaya; Devawongse Varopakarn; Sunandha Kumariratana; Savang Vadhana; Saovabha Phongsri; Svasti Sobhana	
19		Em Nakornthap เอม นาครทรรพ	Luang Prani Prachachon	1839	5 February 1913	Anonganobbakhun	

== List of children ==
No.	Portrait	Name	Mother	Birth	Death	Notes
1		Nobavongse, the Prince Mahesvara Shivavilas นภวงศ์	Chao Chom Manda Noi	6 March 1822	25 July 1867	
2		Supratishtha, the Prince Vishnunatha Nibhadhorn สุประดิษฐ์	Chao Chom Manda Noi	26 May 1824	4 December 1862	
3		Princess Yingyaowalak Agrarajasuda ยิ่งเยาวลักษณ์ อรรคราชสุดา	Phae Dharmasaroja	21 January 1852	February 1886	
4		Prince Daksinavat ทักษิณาวัฏ	Chao Chom Manda Phueng	10 July 1852	1853	
5		Prince Somanass โสมนัส	Somanass Waddhanawathy	21 August 1852	21 August 1852	
6		Princess Daksinajar Naradhirajaputri ทักษิณชา นราธิราชบุตรี	Chan Suksathit	18 September 1852	13 September 1906	
7		Somavadi Sriratanarajadhita, the Princess Samorarattanasirijeshtha โสมาวดี ศรีรัตนราชธิดา	Tieng Rojanadis	19 November 1852	4 May 1931	
8		Unnamed daughter	Talap Punyaratabandhu	22 March 1853	29 March 1853	
9		King Chulalongkorn จุฬาลงกรณ์	Debsirindra	20 September 1853	23 October 1910	
10		Princess Sriphatthana ศรีพัฒนา	Chao Chom Manda Iam	30 November 1853	8 June 1873	
11		Prince Svetravoralabh เสวตรวรลาภ	Tieng Rojanadis	5 May 1854	18 December 1856	
12		Princess Prabhasra ประภัศร	Chao Chom Manda Kes	11 May 1854	29 June 1926	
13		Princess Bhaktra Bimalabarna พักตร์พิมลพรรณ	Phae Dharmasaroja	25 October 1854	18 October 1909	
14		Princess Manyabhadhorn มัณยาภาธร	Chan Suksathit	22 November 1854	26 October 1885	
15		Prince Daeng แดง	Samli Bunnag	19 March 1855	19 May 1855	
16		Chandornmondon Sobhon Bhagiawati, the Princess Visuddhikrasatri จันทรมณฑล	Debsirindra	24 April 1855	14 May 1863	
17		Kritabhinihara, the Prince Naresr Varariddhi กฤษดาภินิหาร	Chao Chom Manda Klin	7 May 1855	10 August 1952	
18		Prince ChaloemLakshnaloet เฉลิมลักษณเลิศ	Bua Na Nagara	26 June 1855	13 July 1856	
19		Princess Srinaga Svati ศรีนาคสวาดิ	Tieng Rojanadis	14 July 1855	7 August 1913	
20		Gagananga Yukala, the Prince Bijitprijakara คัคณางค์ยุคล	Chao Chom Manda Pheung	29 October 1855	11 March 1909	
21		Kannikakaew, the Princess Kattiyakalaya กรรณิกาแก้ว	Princess Chae Siriwongse	10 December 1855	31 May 1882	
22		Unnamed daughter	Chao Chom Manda Malai	5 February 1856	6 February 1856	
23		Sukhasvasti, the Prince Adisorn Udomdej ศุขสวัสดี	Chao Chom Manda Chan	14 March 1856	16 April 1925	
24		Dvithavalyalabh, the Prince Bhudharesdhamrongsak ทวีถวัลยลาภ	Talap Punyaratabandhu	15 March 1856	8 December 1897	
25		Thongkong Kon Yai, the Prince Prachak Silapakhom ทองกองก้อนใหญ่	Chao Chom Manda Sangwan	5 April 1856	25 January 1924	
26		Kashemsanta Sobhaga, the Prince Phromwaranurak เกษมสันต์โสภาคย์	Phae Dharmasaroja	18 August 1856	4 January 1924	
27		Kamalasna Loesan, the Prince Rajasaktisamosorn กมลาสน์เลอสรรค์	Tieng Rojanadis	3 November 1856	13 November 1931	
28		Chaturonrasmi, the Prince Chakkrabatradipongse จาตุรนตรัศมี	Debsirindra	13 January 1857	11 April 1900	
29		Prince Unakan Anantanorajaya อุณากรรณอนันตนรไชย	Piam Sucharitakul	20 February 1857	29 March 1873	
30		Kashemsri Subhayok, the Prince Tivakarawongse Pravati เกษมศรีศุภโยค	Chao Chom Manda Chan	17 August 1857	3 January 1915	
31		Princess Khiao เขียว	Samli Bunnag	21 August 1857	22 August 1857	
32		Princess Samoe Samaihansa เสมอสมัยหรรษา	Chao Chom Manda Malai	2 October 1857	24 February 1874	
33		Srisiddhi Thongjaya, the Prince Siridhaj Sangkas ศรีสิทธิธงไชย	Chao Chom Manda Bua	16 October 1857	11 March 1910	
34		Thongtham Thavalyavongse, the Prince Sanbasatrasubhakij ทองแถมถวัลยวงศ์	Sangwal Na Ratchasima	7 October 1857	16 April 1919	
35		Princess Anonganobbakhun อนงค์นพคุณ	Chao Chom Manda Aim	18 November 1857	22 March 1883	
36		Princess Kanokvanna Lekha กนกวรรณเลขา	Tieng Rojanadis	21 December 1857	29 June 1918	
37		Chumpolsombhoj, the Prince Sanbasiddhiprasong ชุมพลสมโภช	Chao Chom Manda Phueng	29 December 1857	3 April 1922	
38		Princess Arunvadi อรุณวดี	Chao Chom Manda Run Supanimitr	13 January 1858	26 August 1933	
39		Princess Vaniratanakanya วาณีรัตนกัญญา	Kaew Buronsiri	27 January 1858	25 January 1935	
40		Princess Mondha Nobharatana มณฑานพรัตน์	Mod Indravimala	5 May 1858	2 June 1861	
41		Prince Kabkanokrat กาพย์กนกรัตน์	Talap Punyaratabandhu	10 May 1858	17 May 1879	
42		Devan Udayavongse, the Prince Devavongse Varopakarn เทวัญอุไทยวงศ์	Piam Sucharitakul	27 November 1858	28 June 1923	
43		Princess Oradaya Debkanya อรไทยเทพกัญญา	Chao Chom Manda Bua	18 September 1859	4 April 1906	
44		Unnamed daughter	Tieng Rojanadis	30 November 1859	7 December 1859	
45		Bhanurangsi Savangwongse, the Prince Banubandhu Vongsevoradej ภาณุรังษีสว่างวงศ์	Debsirindra	11 January 1860	13 June 1928	
46		Princess Bussabongboekban บุษบงเบิกบาน	Samli Bunnag	1 March 1860	6 June 1876	
47		Manusyanagamanob, the Prince Vajirananavarorasa มนุษยนาคมานพ	Phae Dharmasaroja	12 April 1860	2 August 1921	10th Supreme Patriarch of Siam (1910-1921)
48		Prince Charoenrungrasi เจริญรุ่งราษี	Sangwal Na Ratchasima	21 August 1860	1864	
49		Svastipravatti, the Prince Sommot Amarabandhu สวัสดิประวัติ	Chao Chom Manda Hun	7 September 1860	21 April 1915	
50		Queen Sunanda Kumariratana สุนันทากุมารีรัตน์	Piam Sucharitakul	10 November 1860	31 May 1880	
51		Chandradat Chudhadharn, the Prince Vividhavannapreecha จันทรทัตจุฑาธาร	Mod Indravimala	11 December 1860	10 October 1932	
52		Queen Sukhumala Marasri สุขุมาลมารศรี	Samli Bunnag	10 May 1861	9 July 1927	
53		Princess Nariratana นารีรัตนา	Chao Chom Manda Duangkham	17 August 1861	6 June 1925	
54		Chaiyanuchit, the Prince Bongsadisramahip ไชยานุชิต	Tieng Rojanadis	27 August 1861	28 January 1936	
55		Princess Banchopbenchama บรรจบเบญจมา	Phae Dharmasaroja	5 November 1861	13 September 1892	
56		Voravanakara, the Prince Naradhip Prapanpongse วรวรรณากร	Khian Sirivan	20 November 1861	11 October 1931	
57		Tisavarakumarn, the Prince Damrong Rajanubhab ดิศวรกุมาร	Chao Chom Manda Chum	21 June 1862	1 December 1943	
58		Princess Nongkhran Udomdee นงคราญอุดมดี	Chao Chom Manda Pheng	12 July 1862	20 November 1931	
59		Prince Srisaovabhang ศรีเสาวภางค์	Chao Chom Manda Hem	28 July 1862	11 October 1889	
60		Queen Savang Vadhana of Siam สว่างวัฒนา	Piam Sucharitakul	10 September 1862	17 December 1955	
61		Sonapandit, the Prince Bidyalabha Prueddhidhata โสณบัณฑิต	Wat Ngamsombat	1 April 1863	28 October 1923	
62		Chitcharoen, the Prince Narisara Nuwattiwong จิตรเจริญ	Princess Chae Siriwongse	28 April 1863	10 March 1947	
63		Vaddhananuvongse, the Prince Marubongse Siribaddhana วัฒนานุวงศ์	Chao Chom Manda Bua	27 May 1863	5 April 1923	
64		Princess Kanchanakara กาญจนากร	Sangwal Na Ratchasima	8 June 1863	20 September 1932	
65		Princess Busabanbuaphan บุษบันบัวผัน	Chao Chom Manda Huang	15 October 1863	1 June 1939	
66		Queen Saovabha Phongsri of Siam เสาวภาผ่องศรี	Piam Sucharitakul	1 January 1864	20 October 1919	
67		Princess Khaekhaiduang แขไขดวง	Tieng Rojanadis	11 January 1864	19 August 1929	
68		Nabhabhorn Prabha, the Princess Dibayaratana Kiritkulini นภาพรประภา	Samli Bunnag	13 May 1864	19 July 1958	
69		Prince Damrongrit ดำรงฤทธิ์	Chao Chom Manda Bua	14 January 1865	10 January 1867	
70		Princess Prasansisai ประสานศรีใส	Mom Rajavongse Saeng Palakavangsa	3 March 1865	4 July 1907	
71		Princess Prapalrasmi ประพาฬรัศมี	Chao Chom Manda Soon	11 May 1865	20 July 1903	
72		Prince Charunriddhidej จรูญฤทธิเดช	Tieng Rojanadis	23 May 1865	1 June 1865	
73		Princess Saovabagyabanna เสาวภาคย์พรรณ	Chao Chom Manda Wah	25 May 1865	2 March 1895	
74		Princess Pradisthasari ประดิษฐาสารี	Chao Chom Manda Duangkham	19 July 1865	18 March 1962	
75		Svasti Sobhana, the Prince Svastivatana Visishtha สวัสดิโสภณ	Piam Sucharitakul	22 December 1865	10 December 1935	
76		Jayanta Mongkol, the Prince Mahisara Rajaharudaya ไชยันตมงคล	Chao Chom Manda Huang	30 January 1866	15 April 1907	
77		Princess Puangsoi Sa-ang พวงสร้อยสอางค์	Tieng Rojanadis	30 September 1866	23 April 1950	
78		Princess Praphai Si Sa-ard ประไพศรีสอาด	Mom Rajavongse Saeng Palakavangsa	24 May 1867	18 May 1910	
79		Unnamed daughter	Chao Chom Manda Choei	24 November 1867	24 November 1867	
80		Buddhapradistha พุทธาประดิษฐา	Phum Na Ratchasima	30 September 1866	23 April 1950	
81		Unnamed daughter	Chao Chom Manda Im	18 August 1868	18 August 1868	
82		Princess Charoenkamala Suksavati เจริญกมลสุขสวัสดิ์	Chao Chom Manda Huang	23 March 1869	7 October 1874	
