= Vani Rattanakanya =

Siamese princess (1858–1936)

Vanirattanakanya
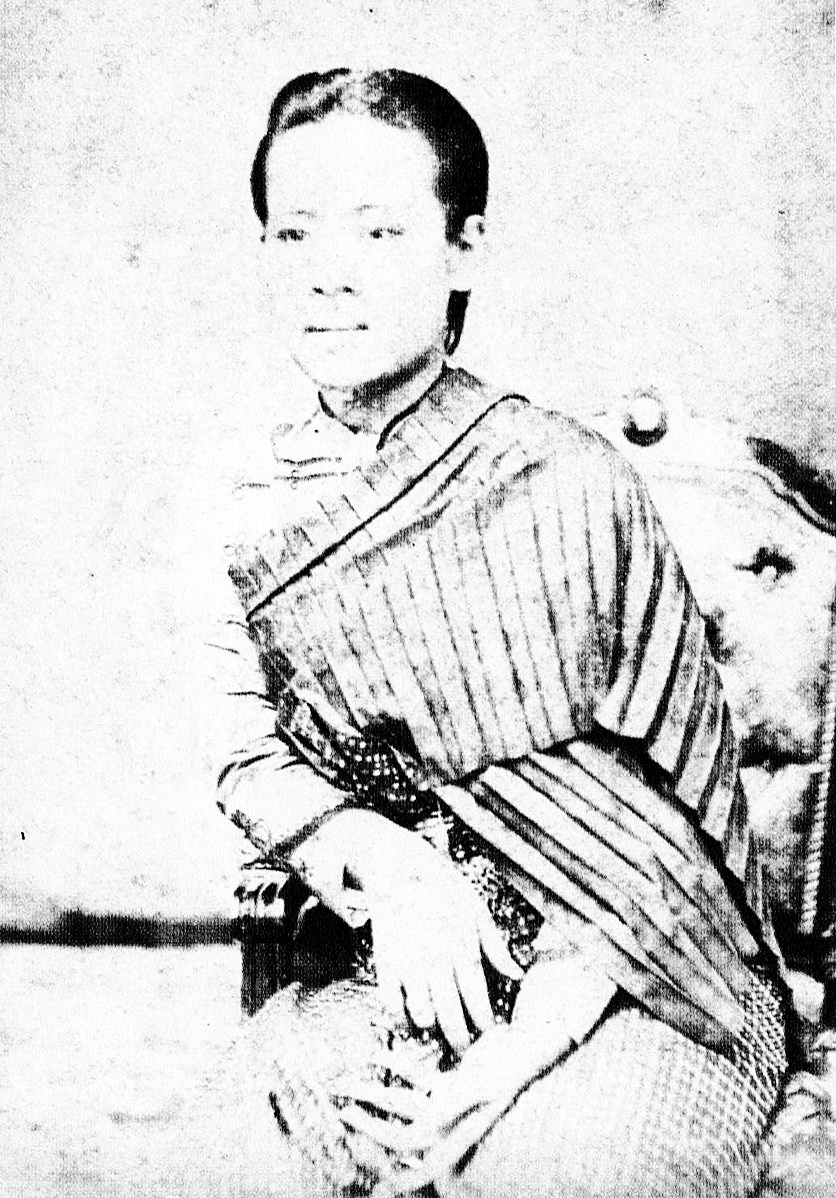
- Princess Vani Rattanakanya
- Born: January 27, 1858; Bangkok, Siam
- Died: January 25, 1936 (aged 77); Bangkok, Siam
- House: Chakri Dynasty
- Father: Mongkut (Rama IV)
- Mother: Kaew Buronsiri

Princess Vanirattanakanya (Thai: วาณีรัตนกัญญา;RTGS: Wanirattanakanya; 27 January 1858 – 26 January 1936) was a princess of Siam (later Thailand). She was a member of the Siamese royal family, a daughter of King Mongkut and Chao Chom Manda Kaew Buronsiri.

Her mother was Chao Chom Manda Kaew Buronsiri. She was given the full name Phra Chao Borom Wong Ther Phra Ong Chao Vanirattanakanya (Thai: พระเจ้าบรมวงศ์เธอ พระองค์เจ้าวาณีรัตนกัญญา).

Princess Vanirattanakanya died on 25 January 1936 at the age 77.

== Royal decoration ==
- เครื่องราชอิสริยาภรณ์จุลจอมเกล้า ชั้นทุติยจุลจอมเกล้าวิเศษ (ฝ่ายใน) (ท.จ.ว.)
- เหรียญรัตนาภรณ์ รัชกาลที่ 4 ชั้นที่ 3 (ม.ป.ร.3)
- เหรียญรัตนาภรณ์ รัชกาลที่ 5 ชั้นที่ 3 (จ.ป.ร.3)
- เหรียญรัตนาภรณ์ รัชกาลที่ 6 ชั้นที่ 2 (ว.ป.ร.2)
- เหรียญรัตนาภรณ์ รัชกาลที่ 7 ชั้นที่ 2 (ป.ป.ร.2)

== Titles ==
- Her Royal Highness Princess Vaniratanakanya 1858-1868
- Her Royal Highness Princess Vanirattanakanya, the princess of sister 1868-1910
- Her Royal Highness Princess Vanirattanakanya 1910-1936

Vani Rattanakanya Chakri dynasty Born: 27 January 1858 Died: 25 January 1936
Order of precedence
Preceded by Princess Arunvadi	Eldest Royal Member of the Chakri Dynasty; 1933–1936	Succeeded by The Prince Bongsadisramahip
