= Kashemsri Subhayok =

- Prince Divakaravongse Pravati
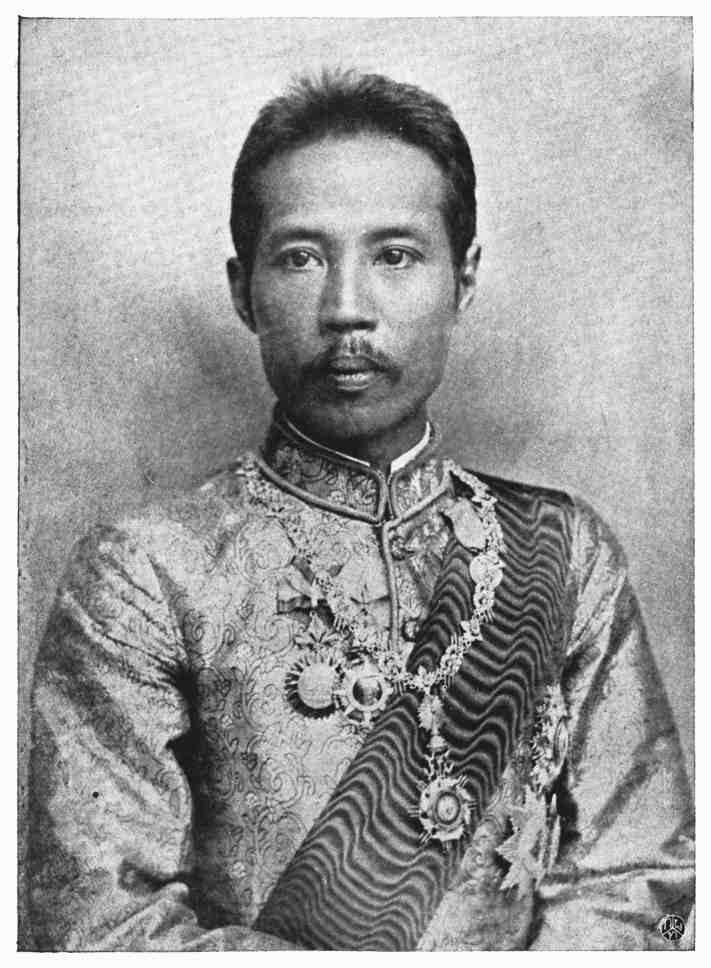
- Born: 17 August 1857; Bangkok, Siam
- Died: 3 January 1915 (aged 57); Bangkok, Siam
- Spouse: Princess Prasansap Singhara; Phoem Sarobon; Phlat; Lamai Panikkabut; Pao; Son Phuangnak; Chaem; Choei; Chuea; Waen Panikkabut
- Issue: 30 children (18 sons, 12 daughters)
- House: Kashemsri family (Chakri Dynasty)
- Father: Mongkut (Rama IV)
- Mother: Chao Chom Manda Chan

Prince Kashemsri Subhayok, the Prince Divakaravongse Pravati [RTGS: Kasemsi Supphayok, the Prince Thiwakon Wongprawat] (พระเจ้าบรมวงศ์เธอ พระองค์เจ้าเกษมศรีศุภโยค กรมหมื่นทิวากรวงศ์ประวัติ), was the thirtieth child of King Rama IV of Thailand, and the fourth child born to Chao Chom Manda Chan, a royal consort of the King, born on 17 August 1857. He was known for his artistic, poetic, and architectural contributions, and served as a privy councillor during the reign of his brother King Chulalongkorn.

King Rama V elevated his royal rank to Kromma Muen (กรมหมื่น), and granted him the titular name of Divakaravongse Pravati (ทิวากรวงศ์ประวัติ) in 1896.

He is the founder of the House of Kashemsri (ราชสกุลเกษมศรี)

Prince Kashemsri Subhayok died in the reign of King Rama VI, on 3 January 1915 at the age of 57 due to illness. King Vajiravudh (Rama VI) presided over the initial funeral rites, before ordering that the prince's body be kept in a ceremonial urn for one year of prayer as was customary for Siamese royals of higher rank. The king also decreed that government officials would observe the funeral of the late prince by wearing mourning attire for fifteen days. After the rites concluded, King Vajiravudh presided over the prince's cremation at Wat Benchamabophit on 11 June 1916. The prince's remains were interred within the royal cloisters surrounding the chedi of Wat Makut Kasattriyaram, the temple of his father King Mongkut. Since then, many members of the House of Kashemsri have chosen to have their remains interred within Wat Makut as well.

== Issue ==
Prince Kashemsri Subhayok had 10 consorts:

1. Mom Poem Kshemasrī na Ayudhya (née Sarobol)
2. Mom Plad Kshemasrī na Ayudhya
3. Mom Lamai Kshemasrī na Ayudhya (née Panikbudh)
4. Mom Pao Kshemasrī na Ayudhya
5. Mom Chao (HSH Princess) Prasansap Kshemasrī na Ayudhya (née Sinharā), a daughter of HRH Prince Singhara, The Prince Bondinpaisansopon Thikachonchoetprayun
6. Mom Son Kshemasrī na Ayudhya (née Puangnak)
7. Mom Cham Kshemasrī na Ayudhya
8. Mom Choey Kshemasrī na Ayudhya
9. Mom Chua Kshemasrī na Ayudhya
10. Mom Waen Kshemasrī na Ayudhya (née Panikbudh)

The prince had 30 children, with 18 sons and 12 daughters.

| Portrait | Name | Mother | Birth | Death | Spouse(s) |
|---|---|---|---|---|---|
| | 1. Mom Chao Padhipatkasemsri | 1st of Mom Poem | March 1872 | 27 November 1924 | Mom Rod; Mom Nueong (Panyarachun) |
| | 2. Mom Chao Mao | 2nd of Mom Poem | 1873 | 27 December 1875 | |
| | 3. Mom Chao Sombatboon | Mom Plad | May 1874 | 3 May 1923 | Mom Chamroen (Panikbudh); Mom Phu |
| | 4. Mom Chao Naen; Elevated to: Phra Ong Chao (HH Prince) Suprayok-Kasem in 1921 | 3rd of Mom Poem | 29 August 1874 | 1932 | Mom Khao (Suranandana); Mom Nuam (Sekarit); Mom Peung (Suranandana) |
| | 5. Mom Chao Pakamal | 1st of Mom Lamai | 1 June 1881 | 27 February 1925 | |
| | 6. Mom Chao Viladh Rampai | Mom Pao | April 1883 | 2 October 1908 | Mom Chao (HSH Princess) Anuchatsuksawat Sukhavasti |
| | 7. Male Mom Chao (Unknown Name) | | 1885 | 26 November 1891 | |
| | 8. Mom Chao Bhunsrikasem | Mom Chao Prasansap | 14 November 1886 | 25 September 1963 | Mom Chao (HSH Princess) Suksrisamon Kshemasrī; Mom Nom |
| | 9. Mom Chao Prapason | 1st of Mom Son | 29 October 1890 | 15 October 1933 | Mom Prapas (Hongsakul) |
| | 10. Mom Chao Trakanchok | 2nd of Mom Lamai | 1890 | 1 March 1904 | |
| | 11. Mom Chao Sombhop | Mom Cham | 7 August 1891 | 24 September 1963 | Mom Yuan (Laksanapranai) |
| | 12. Mom Chao Puek (Male) | | Unknown | Unknown | |
| | 13. Mom Chao Chitapoktawi | 3rd of Mom Lamai | 10 October 1893 | 16 November 1946 | Mom Pon (Laohasedhi) |
| | 14. Mom Chao Lek (Male) | 2nd in Mom Son | 1 January 1893 | 6 May 1894 | |
| | 15. Female Mom Chao (Unknown Name) | | 7 September 1894 | 2 July 1895 | |
| | 16. Mom Chao Wattayakara | 3rd of Mom Son | 28 August 1895 | 14 April 1974 | Mom La-ong (Suksatit); Mom Saiyud (Tawetikul) |
| | 17. Mom Chao Akabandh | 1st of Mom Choey | June 1895 | October 1918 | |
| | 18. Mom Chao Suksrisamon | 4th of Mom Lamai | 11 October 1895 | 16 December 1944 | Mom Chao Bhunsrikasem |
| | 19. Mom Chao Uthaipongse | 1st of Mom Chua | 10 August 1895 | 12 February 1957 | Mom Chao (HSH Princess) Suebsuksawat Sukhavasti |
| | 20. Male Mom Chao (Unknown Name) | | Unknown | 1896 | |
| | 21. Mom Chao Somsong | 4th of Mom Son | 17 September 1898 | 22 February 1942 | Mom Chao (HSH Princess) Nikaradevan Devakula |
| | 22. Mom Chao Ithiponpongse | 1st of Mom Waen | 15 January 1898 | 8 December 1964 | Mom Kasonbubha (Akmanont) |
| | 23. Mom Chao Wilaiwan | 2nd of Mom Chua | 4 July 1898 | 20 January 1946 | Mom Chao (HSH Princess) Suebsuksawat Sukhavasti |
| | 24. Mom Chao Tu (Female) | | Unknown | 2 October 1908 | |
| | 25. Mom Chao Samosonkasem | 5th of Mom Lamai | 16 May 1902 | 23 April 1989 | Mom Chao (HSH Princess) Kaekaicharasri Devakula |
| | 26. Mom Chao Mantana | 2nd of Mom Choey | 20 May 1902 | 23 July 1945 | |
| | 27. Mom Chao Vongkae | 5th of Mom Son | 1 May 1902 | 18 September 1996 | Mom Chao (HSH Princess) Niwadhawongse Kshemasanta |
| | 28. Mom Chao Mongkolyok | 2nd of Mom Waen | 29 June 1910 | 12 July 1930 | |
| | 29. (Mom Chao) Kasem Saovabha; Lost royal rank upon marriage to a commoner | 3rd of Mom Waen | 8 June 1914 | 29 January 2002 | Pierre (Unknown Translation of Foreign Surname) |
| | 30. Mom Chao Bunsalokasem | 4th of Mom Waen | 12 January 1915 | 26 December 1997 | Mom Srisombat (Akmanont) |

== Honours ==
- The Most Illustrious Order of the Royal House of Chakri (Knight)
- King Rama IV Royal Cypher Medal Class 2 (ม.ป.ร.2)
