= Puangsoi Sa-ang =

Siamese princess (1866–1950)

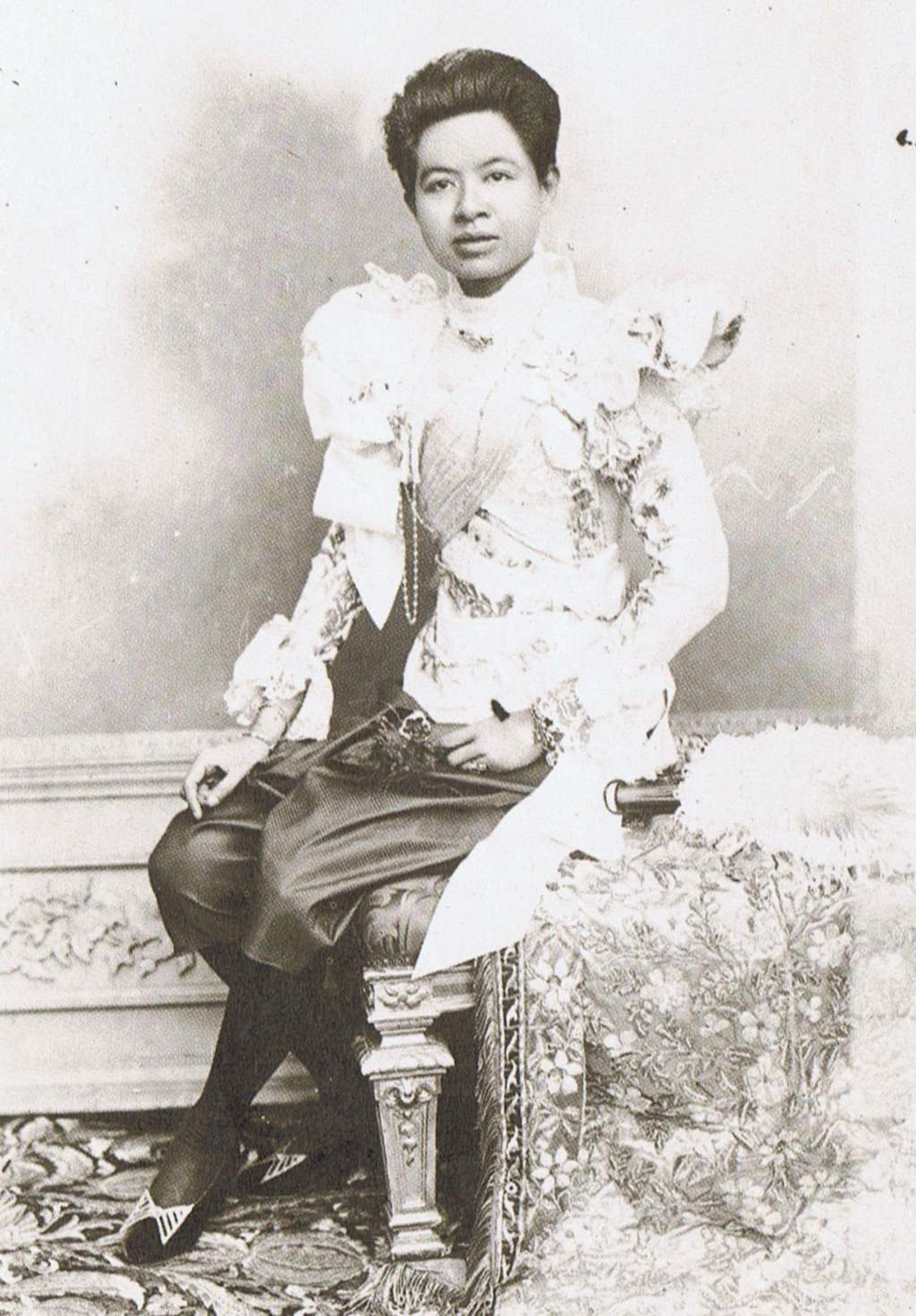
- Born: 30 September 1866; Bangkok, Siam
- Died: 23 April 1950 (aged 83); Bangkok, Thailand
Names
- Her Royal Highness Princess Puangsoi Sa-ang
- House: Chakri Dynasty
- Father: Mongkut (Rama IV)
- Mother: Tieng Rojanadis

Princess Puangsoi Sa-ang (Thai: พวงสร้อยสอางค์; 30 September 1866 – 23 April 1950) was a member of Siamese royal family. She was a daughter of King Mongkut and Concubine Tieng Rojadis and half-sister of Chulalongkorn.

Her mother was Chao Chom Manda Tieng Rojanadis (daughter of Phraya Abbhantrikamat and Klai Rojanadis). She was given full name as Phra Chao Borom Wong Ther Phra Ong Chao Phuangsoi Sa-ang (Thai: พระเจ้าบรมวงศ์เธอ พระองค์เจ้าพวงสร้อยสอางค์).

== Honors ==
- Knight Grand Commander (Second Class, higher grade) of the Most Illustrious Order of Chula Chom Klao
- King Mongkut's Royal Cypher Medal
- King Chulalongkorn's Royal Cypher Medal
- King Rama VI Royal Cypher Medal (First Class)
- King Rama VII Royal Cypher Medal (First Class)
- King Mongkut's Royal Cypher Medal
