= Daksinajar =

Daksinajar Naradhirajbutri
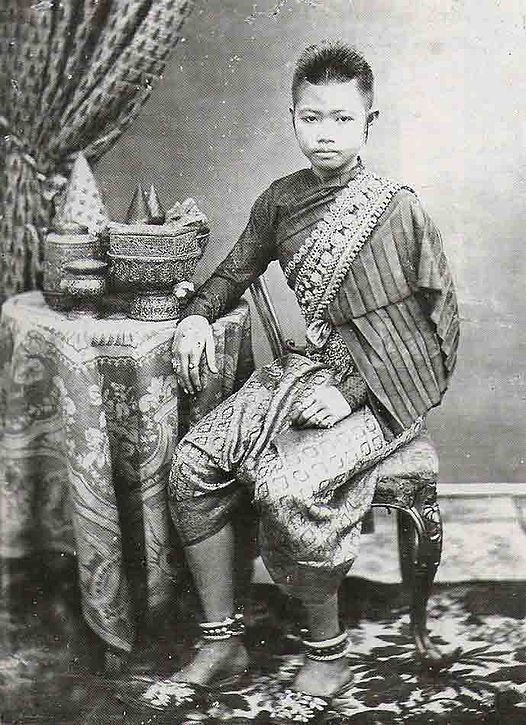

Consort of the Siamese monarch
- Tenure: 1871
- Born: Phra Chao Luk Thoe Phra Ong Chao Daksinajar Naradhirajbutri; 18 September 1852; Bangkok, Siam
- Died: 13 September 1906 (aged 53); Bangkok, Siam
- Spouse: Chulalongkorn (Rama V)
- Dynasty: Chakri
- Father: Mongkut (Rama IV)
- Mother: Consort Chan Suksathit

Daksinajar Naradhirajbutri (Thai: ทักษิณชา นราธิราชบุตรี, RTGS: Thaksinacha Narathiratbuttri, Dakṣiṇajā Narādhirājaputrī; 18 September 1852 – 13 September 1906) was a consort of her half-brother Chulalongkorn, the King of Siam.

She was a member of Siamese royal family and a daughter of King Mongkut and Chan Suksathit, one of Mongkut's concubines. She was married to her agnatic half brother, King Chulalongkorn, in circa 1871. Later, she was styled as princess consort.
