= Kanokvanna Lekha =

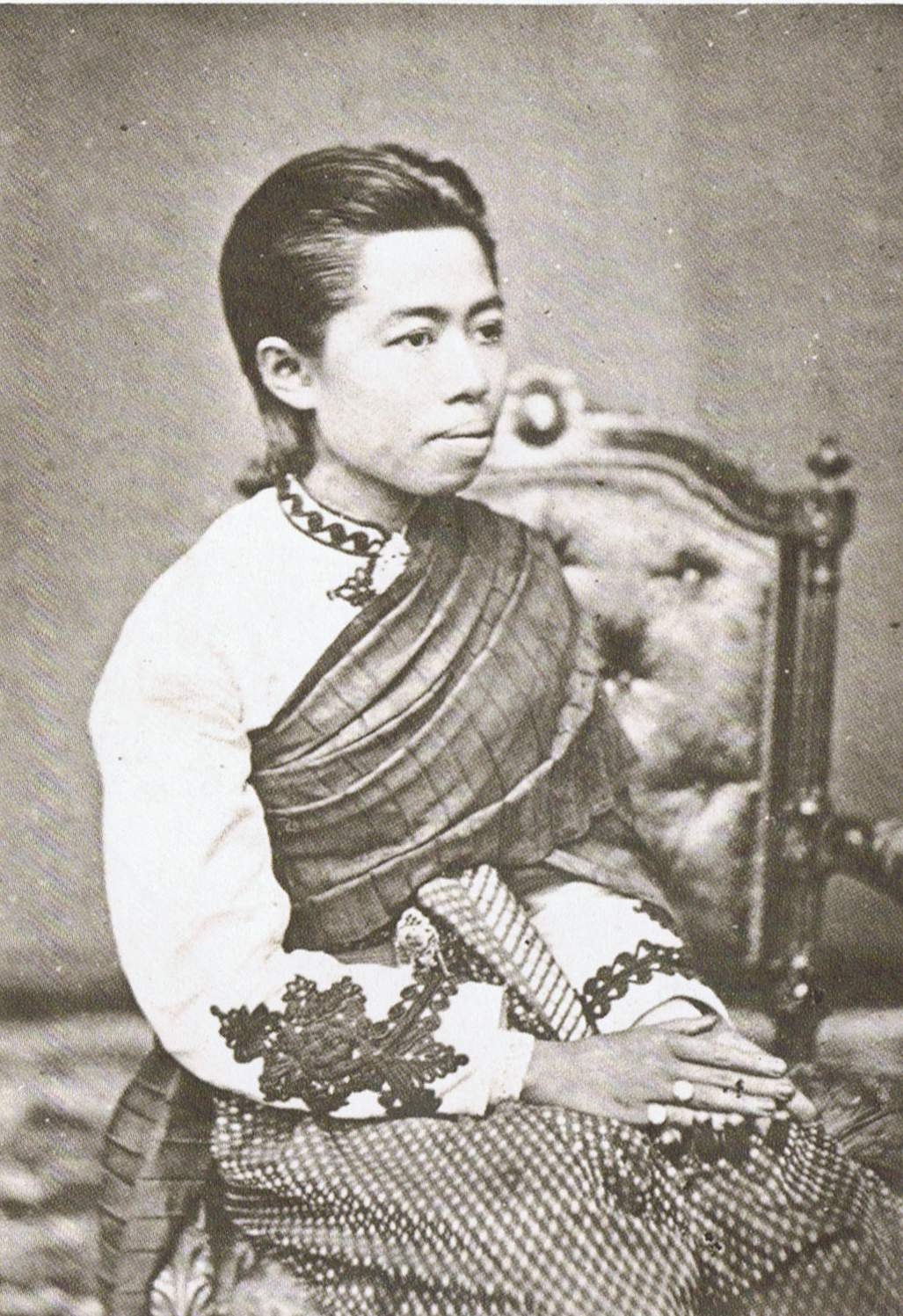
- Born: 21 December 1857; Bangkok, Siam
- Died: 29 June 1918 (aged 60); Bangkok, Siam
Names
- Kanokvanna Lekha
- House: Chakri Dynasty
- Father: Mongkut (Rama IV)
- Mother: Tieng Rojanadis

Princess Kanokvanna Lekha (Thai: กนกวรรณเลขา; RTGS: Kanokwan Lekha; 21 December 1857 - 29 June 1918) was a Princess of Siam (later Thailand). She was a member of the Siamese royal family, a daughter of King Mongkut and Chao Chom Manda Tieng Rojanadis.

Her mother was Tieng Rojanadis (is a daughter of Dis Rojanadis and Klai Rojanadis). Her full name given by her father was Phra Chao Borom wong Ther Phra Ong Chao Kanokvanna Lekha (Thai: พระเจ้าบรมวงศ์เธอ พระองค์เจ้ากนกวรรณเลขา).

Princess Kanokvanna Lekha died 29 June 1916 at the age 60.
