= Manyabhadhorn =

Prince of Siam (Thailand)

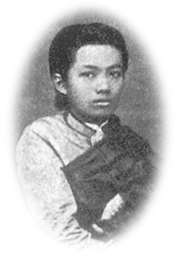
- Born: 22 November 1854; Bangkok, Siam
- Died: 26 October 1885 (aged 30); Bangkok, Siam
Names
- Manyabhadhorn
- House: Chakri Dynasty
- Father: Mongkut (Rama IV)
- Mother: Chan Suksathit

Princess Manyabhadhorn (Thai: มัณยาภาธร ; RTGS: Manyaphathon; 22 September 1854 – 26 October 1885) was a Princess of Siam (now Thailand). She was a member of Siamese royal family is a daughter of King Mongkut and Chao Chom Manda Chan and half-sister of King Chulalongkorn.

Her mother was Chao Chom Manda Chan Suksathit. She was the daughter of Suk Suksathit. She was a given full name by her father as Phra Chao Borom Wong Ther Phra Ong Chao Manyabhadhorn (Thai: พระเจ้าบรมวงศ์เธอ พระองค์เจ้ามัณยาภาธร).

Princess Manyabhadhorn died 26 October 1885 at the age of 30.
