= Kanchanakara =

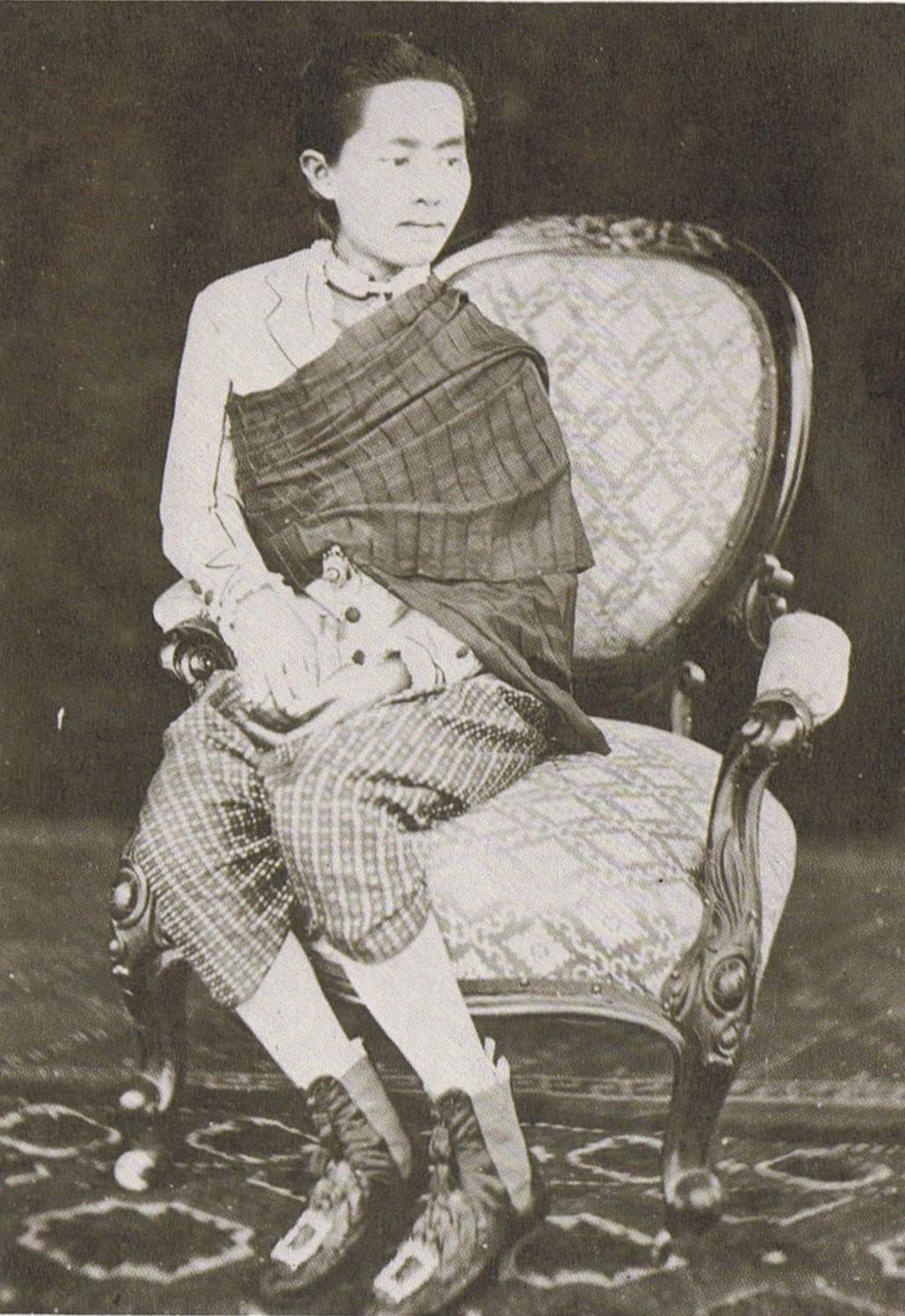
- Born: 8 June 1863; Bangkok, Siam
- Died: 20 September 1932 (aged 69); Bangkok, Siam
Names
- Kanchanakara
- House: Chakri Dynasty
- Father: Mongkut (Rama IV)
- Mother: Sangwal Na Ratchasima

Princess Kanchanakara (Thai: กาญจนากร; RTGS: Kanchanakon; 8 June 1863 - 20 September 1932) was a Princess of Siam (later Thailand). She was a member of the Siamese royal family, born to King Mongkut Rama IV of Siam and Chao Chom Manda Sangwal.

Her mother was Chao Chom Manda Sangwal (daughter of Thongkham Na Ratchasima and Noi Na Ratchasima (Panikabutra). Her full name was Phra Chao Borom Wong Ther Phra Ong Chao Kanchanakara (Thai: พระเจ้าบรมวงศ์วงศ์เธอ พระองค์เจ้ากาญจนากร).

Princess Kanchanakara died on September 20, 1932 at the age of 69.
