= Srinaga Svati =

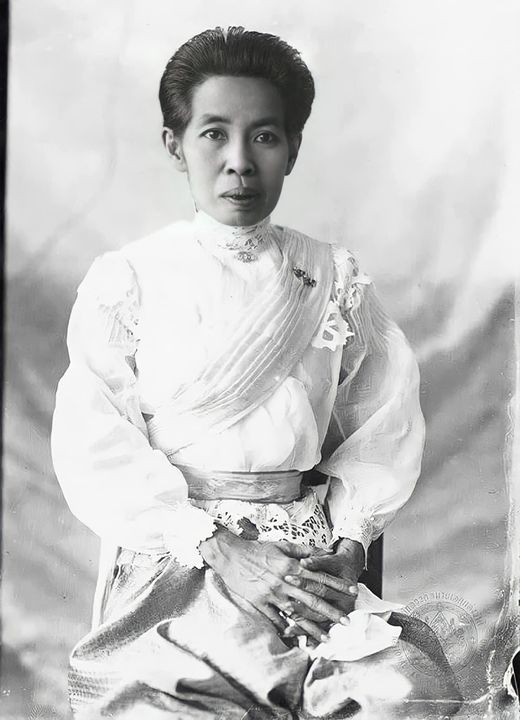
- Born: July 14, 1855; Bangkok, Siam
- Died: August 7, 1913 (aged 58); Bangkok, Siam
Names
- Srinaga Svati
- House: Chakri Dynasty
- Father: Mongkut (Rama IV)
- Mother: Tieng Rojanadis

Princess Srinaga Svati (Thai: ศรีนาคสวาดิ; RTGS: Sinak Sawat; 14 July 1855 – 7 August 1913) was a princess of Siam (later Thailand). She was a member of Siamese royal family is a daughter of King Mongkut (Rama IV) of Siam and Chao Chom Manda Tieng.

Her mother was Chao Chom Manda Tieng (daughter of Dis Rojanadis and Klai Rojanadis). She was given the full name as Phra Chao Borom Wong Ther Phra Ong Chao Srinaga Svati (Thai: พระเจ้าบรมวงศ์เธอ พระองค์เจ้าศรีนาคสวาดิ).

Princess Srinaga Svati died on 7 August 1913 at the age of 58.
