= Arunvadi =

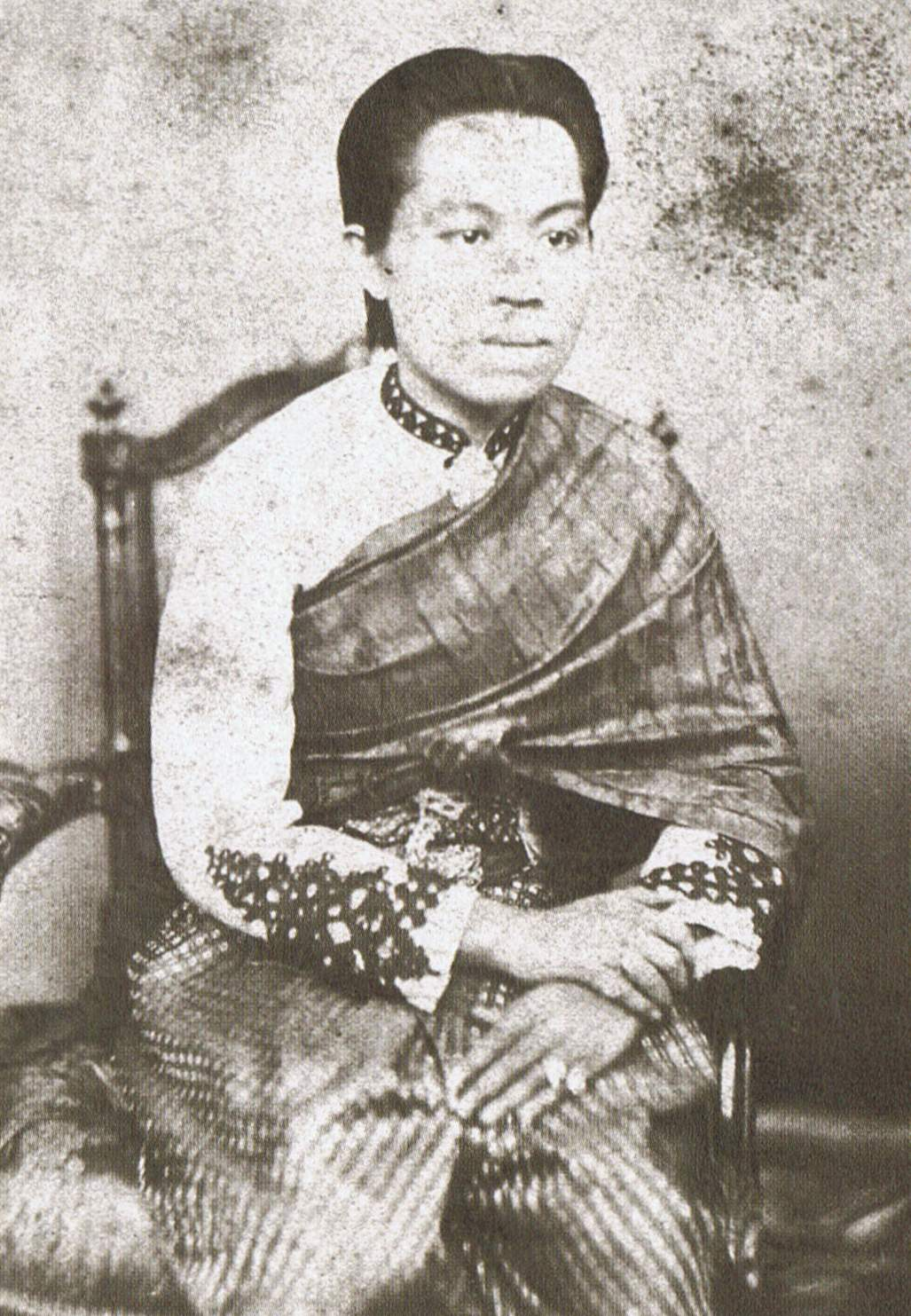
- Born: June 13, 1857; Bangkok, Siam
- Died: August 26, 1933 (aged 76); Bangkok, Siam
- Phra Chao Borom Wong Ther Phra Ong Chao Arunvadi
- House: Chakri dynasty
- Father: Mongkut (Rama IV)
- Mother: Chao Chom Manda Run Supanimitr

Princess Arunvadi (Thai: อรุณวดี; 13 June 1857 - 26 August 1933) was a princess of Siam (later Thailand). She was a member of the Siamese royal family and a daughter of King Mongkut of Siam and Chao Chom Manda Run.

Her mother was Chao Chom Manda Run Supanimitr (a daughter of Kratai Supanimitr and Cham Supanimitr). She was given the full name Phra Chao Borom Wong Ther Phra Ong Chao Arunvadi (Thai: พระเจ้าบรมวงศ์เธอ พระองค์เจ้าอรุณวดี).

She died on August 26, 1933, at the age of 76.

== Honours ==
- Dame Grand Commander (Second Class, upper grade) of the Most Illustrious Order of Chula Chom Klao (1899)
- Dame Commander (Second Class, lower grade) of the Most Illustrious Order of Chula Chom Klao (1893)
- King Rama IV Royal Cypher Medal, 3rd Class (1904)
- King Rama V Royal Cypher Medal, 3rd Class (1908)
- King Rama VI Royal Cypher Medal, 2nd Class (1913)
- King Rama VII Royal Cypher Medal, 2nd Class (1926)

Arunvadi Chakri dynasty Born: 13 June 1857 Died: 26 August 1933
Order of precedence
| Preceded by The Princess Samorarattanasirijeshtha | Eldest Royal Member of the Chakri Dynasty; 1931–1933 | Succeeded by Princess Vanirattanakanya |
