= Somavadi Srirattanarajadhida =

Somavadi Srirattanadhida
- Princess Samoraratana Sirijeshtha
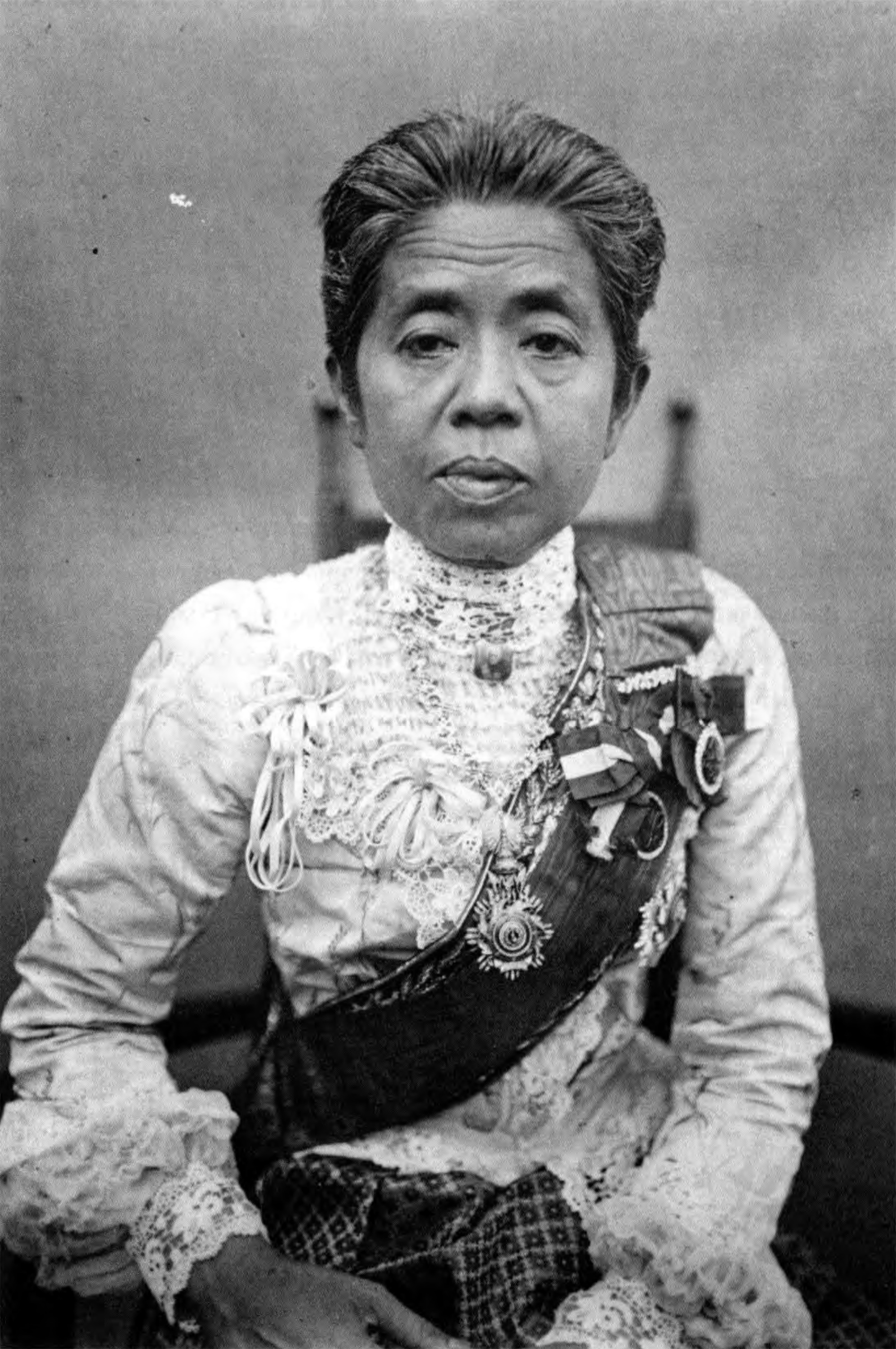
- Born: 19 November 1852; Bangkok, Siam
- Died: 4 May 1931 (aged 78); Bangkok, Siam
- House: Chakri Dynasty
- Father: Mongkut (Rama IV)
- Mother: Tieng Rojanadis

Princess Somavadi Sriratanarajadhida, the Princess Samoraratana Sirijeshtha (Thai: โสมาวดี ศรีรัตนราชธิดา; RTGS: Somawadi Si Rattanaratchathida 19 November 1852 - 4 May 1931) was a Princess of Siam (later Thailand). She was a member of the Siamese royal family and daughter of King Mongkut and Chao Chom Manda Tieng.

Her mother was Chao Chom Manda Tieng (a daughter of Dis Rojanadis and Klai Rojanadis). She was given the full name Phra Chao Borom Wong Ther Phra Ong Chao Somavadi Srirattanarajadhida Krom Luang Samoraratana Sirijeshtha (Thai: พระเจ้าบรมวงศ์เธอ พระองค์เจ้าโสมาวดี ศรีรัตนราชธิดา กรมหลวงสมรรัตนสิริเชษฐ์).

Princess Somavadi died on 4 May 1931 at the age 78.

Somavadi Srirattanarajadhida Chakri dynasty Born: 19 November 1852 Died: 4 May 1931
Order of precedence
Preceded by Princess Maenkhian	Eldest Royal Member of the Chakri Dynasty; 1913–1931	Succeeded by Princess Arunvadi
