= Khaekhaiduang =

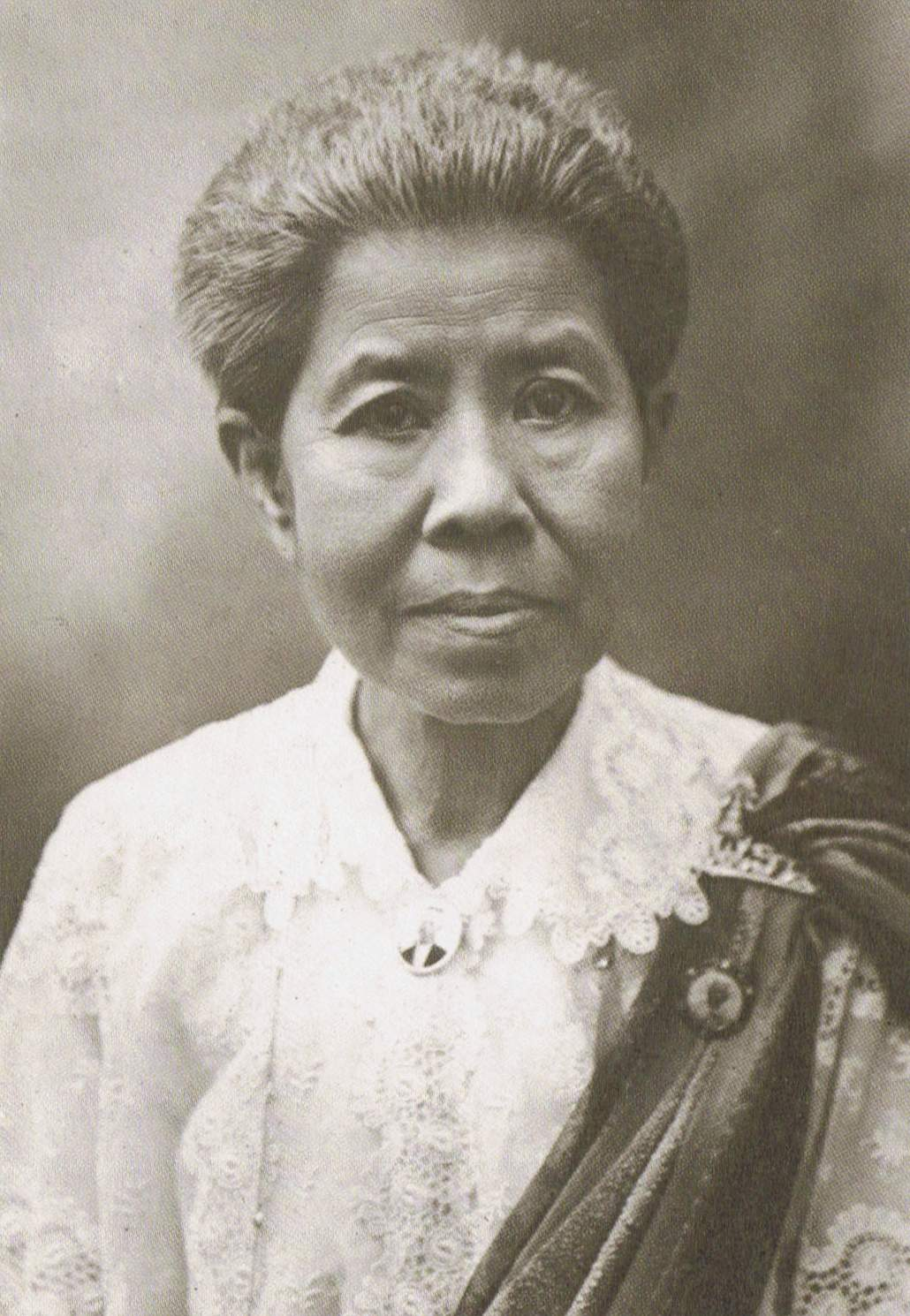
- Born: 11 January 1863; Bangkok, Siam
- Died: 19 August 1929 (aged 66); Bangkok, Siam
Names
- Phra Chao Borom Wong Ther Phra Ong Chao Khaekhaiduang
- House: Chakri Dynasty
- Father: Mongkut (Rama IV)
- Mother: Tieng Rojanadis
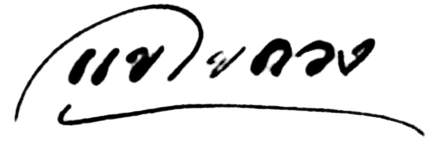
- Signature

Princess Khaekhaiduang (Thai: แขไขดวง; 11 January 1863 - 19 August 1929) was a Princess of Siam (later Thailand). She was a member of the Siamese royal family and was a daughter of King Mongkut and Consort Tieng.

Her mother was Chao Chom Manda Tieng (daughter of Dis Rojanadis and Khai Rojanadis), She was given the full name Phra Chao Borom Wong Ther Phra Ong Chao Khaekhaiduang (Thai: พระเจ้าบรมวงศ์เธอ พระองค์เจ้าแขไขดวง).

Princess Khaekhaiduang died on 19 August 1929 at the age of 66.
