= Mondha Nobharatana =

- Born: 5 May 1858; Bangkok, Siam
- Died: 2 June 1861 (aged 3); Bangkok, Siam
Names
- Mondha Nobharatana
- House: Chakri Dynasty
- Father: Mongkut (Rama IV)
- Mother: Mod Indravimala

Princess Mondha Nobharatana (Thai: มณฑานพรัตน์ RTGS: Montha Noppharat; 5 May 1858 – 2 June 1861) was a Princess of Siam (later Thailand). She was a member of the Siamese royal family and was a daughter of King Mongkut of Siam and Chao Chom Manda Mod Indravimala.

Her mother was The Noble Consort (Chao Chom Manda) Mod (a daughter of In Indravimala). She was given her full name by her father - Phra Borom Wong Ther Phra Ong Chao Mondha Nobharatana (Thai: พระเจ้าบรมวงศ์เธอ พระองค์เจ้ามณฑานพรัตน์). She had one younger brother, Prince Chandradat Chudadhan.

Princess Mondha Nobharatana died on 2 June 1861, aged 3.

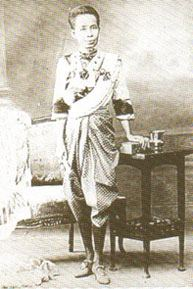
The Noble Consort (Chao Chom Manda) Mod
