= Somanass Waddhanawathy =

Queen of Siam from 1851 to 1852

Somanass Waddhanawathy; โสมนัสวัฒนาวดี
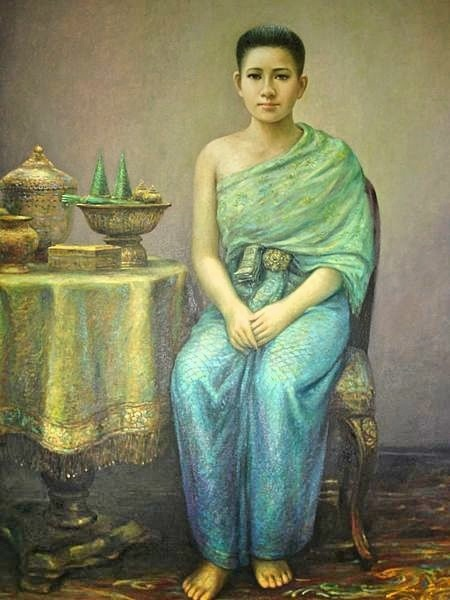

Queen consort of Siam
- Tenure: 2 April 1851 – 10 October 1852
- Born: Princess Somanass; 21 December 1834; Bangkok, Siam
- Died: 10 October 1852 (aged 17); Bangkok, Siam
- Spouse: Mongkut (Rama IV)
- Issue: Prince Somanass
Posthumous name
- Somdet Phra Nang Chao Somanass Waddhanawathy
- Dynasty: Chakri
- Father: Prince Lakkhananukhun
- Mother: Ngiu Suvarnadat
- Religion: Theravada Buddhism

Somanass Waddhanawathy (Thai: โสมนัสวัฒนาวดี; Thai pronunciation: [sǒː.má(ʔ).nát.wát.tʰà(ʔ).nāː.wá(ʔ).diː]; RTGS: Somanat Watthanawadi; 1834–1852) was the first consort of Mongkut, the King of Siam, and the queen consort, though for only nine months.

== Life ==
Princess Somanass was a daughter of Prince Lakkhananukhun (son of Nangklao) and Ngiu Suvarnadat. Since her father, as a son of the king and of a royal concubine, was Phra Ong Chao (second-rank prince), Somanass was destined to be Mom Chao (third-rank princess). However, King Nangklao (Rama III) who was her grandfather, specially granted her the title of Phra Ong Chao (second-rank princess).

In 1851, upon his coronation, Mongkut married Princess Somanass, making her the queen. In 1852, she gave birth to a prince, Somdet Chaofa Somanass, but he died shortly after he was born; Queen Somanass herself died two months later.

== Ancestors ==
Ancestors of Somanass Waddhanawathy

16. Buddha Yodfa Chulaloke (Rama I)
8. Buddha Loetla Nabhalai (Rama II)
17. Amarindra
4. Nangklao (Rama III)
18. Lord Nonthaburisrimahauthayan (Bunchan)
9. Princess Sri Sulalai
19. Pheng
2. Prince Lakkhananukhun
10. Muang
5. Bang
11.
1. Somanass Waddhanawathy
6. Thongsuk Suvarnadat
3. Ngiu Suvarnadat
7. Thongchan Suvarnadat

Somanass Waddhanawathy House of Chakri Born: 21 December 1834 Died: 10 October 1852
Thai royalty
Vacant Title last held by Sri Suriyendra as consort	Queen consort of Siam; 1851–1852	Succeeded by Ramphoei Siriwong
