= Devawongse Varoprakar =

Devan Udayawongse
- Prince Devawongse Varoprakar
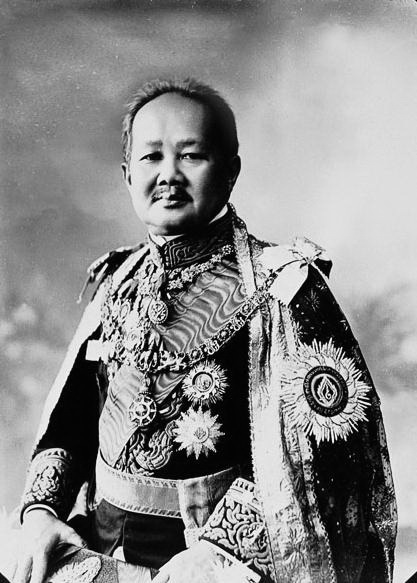

Minister of Foreign Affairs
- In office: 12 June 1885 – 28 June 1923
- Predecessor: Tuam Bunnag
- Successor: Traidos Praband
- Born: 27 November 1858; Bangkok, Siam
- Died: 28 June 1923 (aged 64); Bangkok, Siam
- Spouse: Yai Sucharitakul; Lamai Xuto; Muean; Pun; Op Amatyakul; Phuk Chandrasen; Chan
- Issue: 48 sons and daughters
- House: Devakula family (Chakri Dynasty)
- Father: Mongkut (Rama IV)
- Mother: Piam Sucharitakul

Devan Udayawongse, the Prince Devawongse Varoprakar (Thai: สมเด็จพระเจ้าบรมวงศ์เธอ พระองค์เจ้าเทวัญอุไทยวงศ์ กรมพระยาเทวะวงศ์วโรปการ, RTGS: Thewawong Worapakan; 27 November 1858 – 28 June 1923) was a Siamese prince and diplomat during the reigns of Rama V and Rama VI.

Born as son of King Mongkut and Princess Consort Piam with the given name Prince Devan Udayawongse (เทวัญอุไทยวงศ์; RTGS: Thewan-u-thaiwong), he had the same parents as the three queens of King Chulalongkorn, Queen Sunandha Kumariratana, Queen Savang Vadhana and Queen Saovabha Bhongsi. Prince Devawongse Varoprakar was the 42nd child of King Mongkut's 82 children.

He is the founder of the House of Devakula (ราชสกุลเทวกุล) and was also known for naming the solar calendar months after the zodiac signs.

== Life ==
Prince Devavongse Varoprakar was born in Bangkok's Grand Palace on 27 November 1858 to King Mongkut, Rama IV of Siam and Princess Consort Piyamavadi (Piam Sucharitakul). He was their second child and their second son of the total 6 children which were

1. Prince Unakan Ananta Norajaya
2. Prince Devan Udayawongse (Later Prince Devawongse Varoprakar)
3. Princess Sunandha Kumariratana (Later Queen Sunandha Kumariratana)
4. Princess Savang Vadhana (Later Queen Sri Savarindira, the Queen Grandmother)
5. Princess Saovabha Bongsi (Later Queen Sri Bajarindra, the Queen Mother)
6. Prince Svasti Sobhana (Later Prince Svastivatana Visishta).

As a child, he had studied both Thai literature then ordained, and later studied English course in the Grand Palace. He first worked in the royal court of King Chulalongkorn, Rama V of Siam as an officer in the royal audit office, at the age of 17. He was promoted to be the King's private secretary in the foreign affairs, then be the King's Principal Secretary, as well the director of the comptroller general. Moreover, he was bestowed the royal nobility title of Krom Muean Devawongse Varoprakar in 1881.

At the age of 27, when Chao Phraya Phanuwongse Mahakosa Thobodi (Tuam Bunnag) had resigned, he was promoted to be the Minister of Foreign Affairs in which role he started to establish modern diplomatic methods and policies. He was known by foreign diplomats and officials as "Prince Dewan of Siam".

As the Siamese King's delegate to the Golden Jubilee of Queen Victoria, he had visited many countries and observed the administrative patterns and methods of each country. As a result, the Siamese royal court was evolved since then as the modern royal administrative system was set with 12 formal ministries in 1892. In the international relation and politics, he had played the major role in several incidents during that time including all the treaties with many countries and the French Indochina-Siamese conflict; as well the domestic issues and issues involving the royal court.

He had asked the King's permission to settle the permanent office of the ministry outside his residence, and the permanent embassies abroad, first in London then Paris and more. Later, he was bestowed the royal title of Krom Luang Devawongse Varoprakar in 1886. King Rama V informally called Prince Devan as his "right hand".

During the reign of King Vajiravudh, Rama VI of Siam, who was the child of his maternal younger sister, Queen Sri Bajarindra, the Queen Mother, he was delegated to work as the Head of the King's administration (Prime Minister) and was awarded the title of Krom Phra Devawongse Varoprakar, in 1911. He was also delegated many positions of the royal court of King Rama VI such as the chairman of the minister council.

Later in 1916 he was one of few princes of Siam who was not born to the Queen but bestowed the royal title of Somdet Krom Phraya Devawongse Varoprakar, of which the rank of Somdet Krom Phraya is the highest rank for the prince who works in the Siamese royal court and normally preserved for Chao Fa (children born to the Queen) or Prince Supreme Patriarch only.

At the age of 64 Prince Devawongse died due to sepsis from a carbuncle (abscess), complicated by his diabetes, at Devavesma palace, his residence, on 28 June 1923. His funeral was held in his residence, and the royal cremation ceremony, presided over by King Rama VI, who mourned him with traditional all-white dress, was held at Sanam Luang .

== Institute of Foreign Affairs ==
The Devawongse Varopakarn Institute of Foreign Affairs (DVIFA) named after the former minister Devawongse Varoprakar and is supervised by the Ministry of Foreign Affairs.

== Ancestors ==
Ancestors of Devawongse Varoprakar

8. Buddha Yodfa Chulaloke
4. Buddha Loetla Nabhalai
9. Nak Na Bangxang
2. Mongkut
10. Ngoen Sae-tan
5. Bunrot
11. Kaeo, Princess Si Sudarak
1. Devan Udayawongse, Prince Devawongse Varoprakar
6. Taeng Sucharitakul, Luang Asasamdaeng
3. Piam Sucharitakul
7. Nak, Thao Sucharitthamrong

Devawongse Varoprakar House of Devakula Cadet branch of the House of Chakri Born: 27 November 1858 Died: 28 June 1923
Political offices
Preceded by Chao Phraya Phanuwong Mahakosathibodi	Minister of Foreign Affairs; 1885–1923	Vacant Title next held by Devawongse Varodaya
