= Kanit Sarasin =

Thai host and actor

Kanit Sarasin (born 25 December 1964), nicknamed Pe, is a Thai host and actor.

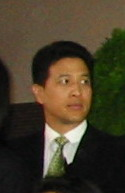
Kanit Sarasin at Star Entertainment awards 2007

He is the youngest son of Pao and Thawika Sarasin. He graduated from Chulalongkorn University Demonstration School, Chiang Mai University and Boston University. He has 2 sons named Gorawit and Anapat.

After He graduated, he worked in Charoen Pokphand, Standard Chartered PLC. He is an actor and the host of the TV programs named Are You Smarter than a 5th Grader? and Metrosexual

== See also ==
- Sarasin family
