= Alabaster (disambiguation) =

Alabaster is a name applied to certain minerals. Alabaster may also refer to:

== Places ==
- Alabaster, Alabama, United States, a city
- Alabaster Township, Michigan, United States
- Lake Alabaster, South Island, New Zealand

== Literature ==
- Alabaster (manga), a 1970 manga by Osamu Tezuka
- Alabaster (short story collection), a book containing stories by Caitlín R. Kiernan
- Alabaster (play), a 2017 play by Audrey Cefaly

== Music ==
- "Alabaster", a song by Emma Pollock from her 2016 album In Search of Harperfield
- "Alabaster", a song by Foals from Total Life Forever
- "Alabaster", a song by Rend Collective Experiment from Homemade Worship by Handmade People
- "Alabaster", a song by All Them Witches from their 2017 album Sleeping Through the War
- "Alabaster", a song by Andrew Huang from his 2019 album Alabaster
- "Alabaster", a song by Andrew Bird from his 2020 album Hark!

== Other uses ==
- Alabaster (surname), an English surname
- USS Alabaster, a World War II coastal patrol yacht
- Alabaster, one of the shades of white
