= Henry Alabaster =

British diplomat

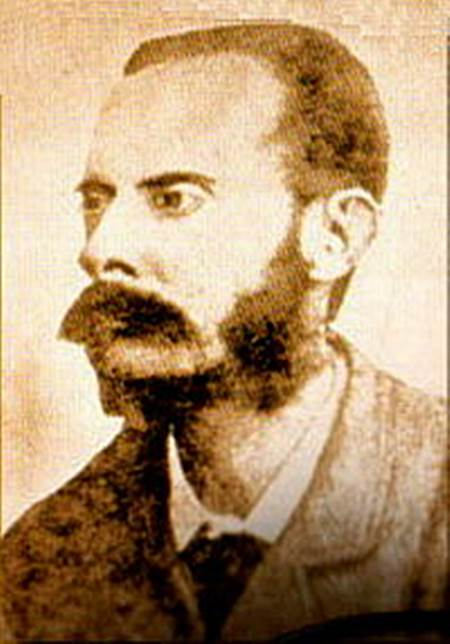
- Born: 22 May 1836; Hastings, England
- Died: 9 August 1884 (aged 48); Bangkok, Thailand
- Occupations: Diplomat, royal advisor
- Notable work: The Wheel of the Law
- Parent(s): James Chaloner Alabaster; Harriet Woodman
- Relatives: Chaloner Alabaster (brother); Mary Ann Criddle (aunt); Siddhi Savetsila (grandson)

Henry Alabaster (22 May 1836 – 9 August 1884) was a British-born diplomat who became an advisor to King Chulalongkorn of Siam.

== Early life and family ==
Henry Alabaster was born in 1836, the son of James Chaloner Alabaster and Harriet Woodman. His paternal aunt, Mary Ann Criddle, was a notable artist, while his younger brother Chaloner Alabaster was an English diplomat and administrator in China. He was educated at King's College London.

== Consular service in Siam ==
Alabaster first came to Siam in 1856 as an interpreter in British service, during the reign of King Mongkut (Rama IV). He later became the acting consul, during which time he worked closely with the king, including on the building of the first modern road in Thailand, Charoen Krung Road. He resigned from consular service after a dispute with Somdet Chaophraya Sri Suriwongse, and returned to Britain, where he completed his 1871 book The Wheel of the Law, a study of Buddhism which incorporated a translation of Chaophraya Thiphakorawong's Nangsue Sadaeng Kitchanukit.

== Return to Siam ==
Alabaster returned to Siam in 1873 to serve as private secretary to King Chulalongkorn (Rama V). He oversaw many modernization efforts at this time, many of Thailand’s firsts. This included the building of roads, bridges and libraries (Thailand’s first road, Charoen Krung, was overseen by Alabaster), the founding of the national museum, post office and the royal cartography service, and sending the sons and daughters of royalty and high-ranking positions abroad for study. One of his roles was Director of the Royal Museum and Garden; he sent botanical specimens to China for his brother Chaloner, an amateur plant collector. He was the first director of the kingdom's map-making division, established in 1875, and had teams of surveyors develop maps for use in building roads and telegraphs as well as protecting territorial waters.

== Death ==
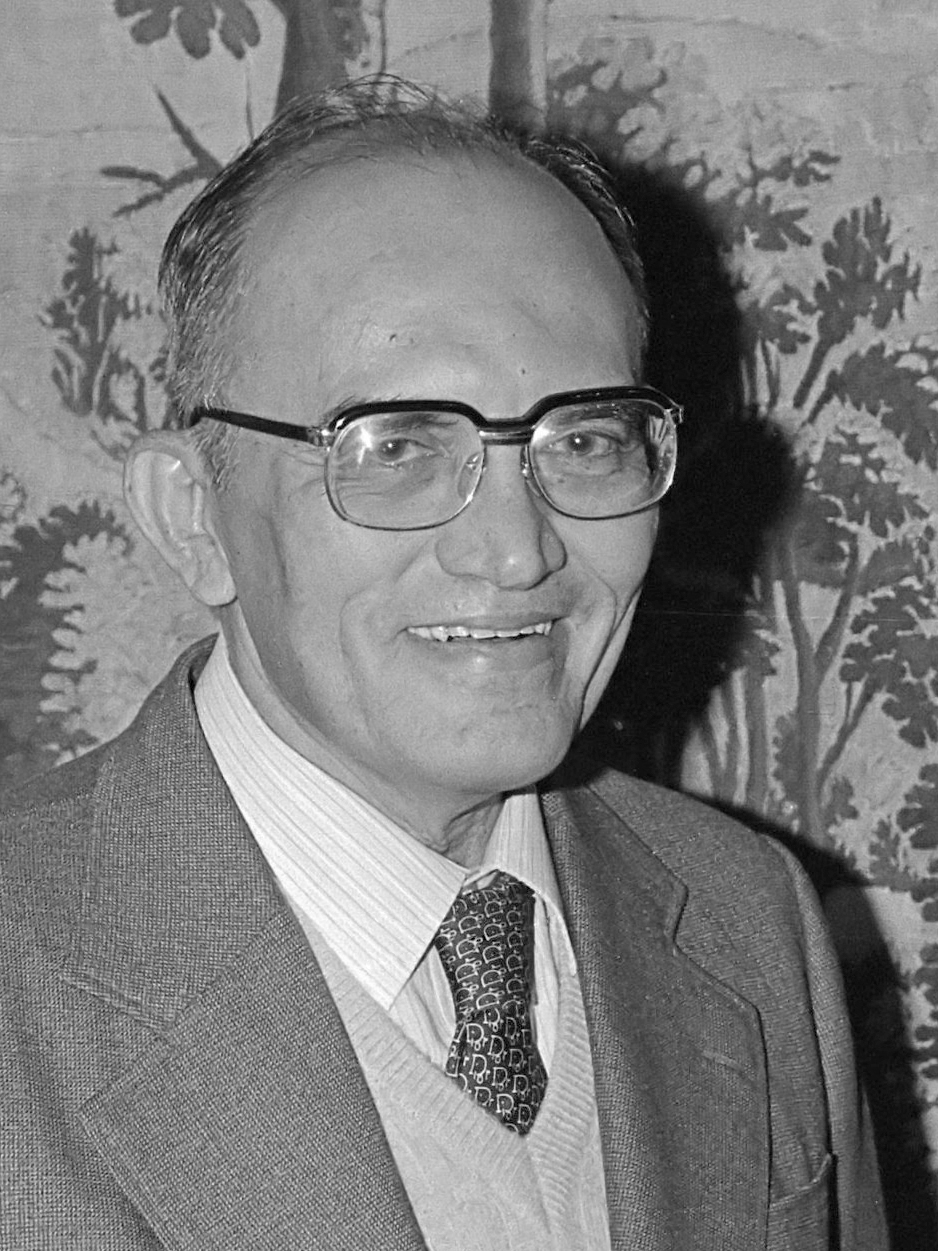
His grandson, Air Chief Marshal Siddhi Savetsila

Alabaster died in 1884, at the age of 48, three days after suffering paralysis of his lower jaw. He remained in his position until his death, when he was buried with the full honors of a Phraya in Bangkok Protestant Cemetery. His monument there, erected by order of Chulalongkorn himself, is considered the finest in the cemetery. While well-regarded by the Thais, he was disparaged by the British Foreign Office as "a good for nothing fellow who was dismissed," likely due to his efforts at keeping Siam from becoming a British colony.

== Descendants ==
Alabaster married Palacia Emma Fahey in 1865; they had four children. He also married a Thai woman, Perm, during his second sojourn in Siam; they had two sons, both of whom held the rank of Phraya. His descendants were given the Thai surname of Savetsila, meaning "white stone" (analogous to the meaning of the word "alabaster"). He was the paternal grandfather of Air Chief Marshal Siddhi Savetsila, who was Minister of Foreign Affairs from 1980 to 1990.
