= National Security Council (Thailand) =

- สภาความมั่นคงแห่งชาติ

Agency overview
- Formed: 11 December 1910; 115 years ago
- Jurisdiction: Government of Thailand
- Headquarters: Government House 1 Phitsanulok Road Dusit, Bangkok, Thailand
- Agency executives: Anutin Charnvirakul, Chairperson; General Chaiyapruek Duangprapat, Secretary-General
- Parent agency: Office of the Prime Minister
- Website: nsc.go.th

The National Security Council (NSC, Thai: สภาความมั่นคงแห่งชาติ), served by its operating body the Office of the National Security Council (Thai: สำนักงานสภาความมั่นคงแห่งชาติ), is the principal Thai national security and intelligence forum used by the Prime Minister and Cabinet of Thailand for coordinating security and defense policies for Thailand.

The National Security Council has an office that performs secretarial duties for the council, the Office of the National Security Council. the Office of the National Security Council has an administration system under the Office of the Prime Minister but receive orders directly under the Prime Minister.

== History ==
The National Security Council was established by the initiative of King Rama VI, whose purpose was to have a military mission to defend the country. Therefore, a council was formed on 11 December 1910, with the King as the chairman and the Chief-of-Staff of the Royal Thai Army as the Secretary-General of the council. Its duty was to provide recommendations and policies to protect the country during World War I.

On 27 July 1927, there was an amendment to the composition and authority and a new name: “the National Defense Council” until 14 July 1932, after the Siamese revolution of 1932, the National Defense Council was dissolved.

Later on 11 January 1944 during World War II, "the War Council" was established by issuing the War Council Act, which was the first Act regarding the National Security Council. Still, it was canceled because "the National Defense Council" was established instead by issuing the National Defense Council Act on 10 September 1944.

On 31 January 1956, a new National Defense Council Act was issued, repealing the old Act and remaining in use until the repeal of the National Defense Council Act, 1956, and the promulgation of the National Security Council Act, B.E. 1959 marks a change from the "National Defense Council" has been the "National Security Council (NSC)" until today.

One of the main responsibilities of the NSC since its inception has been to solve problems in the South Thailand insurgency, immigrant, Border control, Transnational crime and terrorism, including using the NSC to manage emergency situations such as political demonstration and disasters.

The NSC has created the Institute of Security Studies (ISS) to serve as an internal think tank tasked with spreading security expertise and advancing research on security policies.

Under Prime Minister Prayut Chan-o-cha, NSC has been used as the main agency in dealing with COVID-19 pandemic in Thailand, with the establishment of the Centre for COVID-19 Situation Administration (CCSA) Operations Center, with the NSC secretary-general as director to integrate all agencies in the country to deal with COVID-19. This situation causes Health security to be classified as one of the security that the National Security Council gives importance to as national security. During Russian invasion of Ukraine in 2022 which resulted in an energy and food crisis in Thailand, Prime Minister Prayut Chan-o-cha has used NSC as the main agency in preparing plans to deal with energy and food crises in the short, medium, and long term.

In 2025, Prime Minister Paetongtarn Shinawatra use the NSC as a mechanism for collaboration between security agencies to address scam city along the Myanmar–Thailand border. It is additionally used as a mechanism for deciding on the disconnection of electrical service, oil transportation and internet signals to scam city areas, preventing those areas from utilizing Thailand for the commission of crimes. Following the 2025 Cambodia–Thailand border conflict, Prime Minister Paetongtarn called a meeting of the NSC to find a resolution to the tense situation along the border. After extensive deliberations, the NSC resolved that the Royal Thai Army and the Ministry of Foreign Affairs would jointly be responsible for addressing the issue. Their approach must adhere to the principle of protecting national sovereignty while simultaneously maintaining optimal relations with neighboring countries. The NSC mechanism for resolving border conflicts remained in use under Prime Minister Anutin Charnvirakul.

== Membership ==
According to the provisions under the National Security Council Act B.E. 2559 (2016), Section 6 stipulates the establishment of the National Security Council, which consists of 11 ex officio members as follows:

Structure of the Thai National Security Council
Chairman	Prime Minister
Vice-chairman	Deputy Prime Minister for Security Affairs
Regular attendees	Minister of Defence; Minister of Finance; Minister of Foreign Affairs; Minister of Transport; Minister of Digital Economy and Society; Minister of Interior; Minister of Justice; Chief of Defence Forces; Secretary-General of the National Security Council
Additional participants	Minister, Government officials, and/or experts deemed appropriate to invite to give opinions and vote at the meeting

In each meeting of the National Security Council, ministers, heads of government agencies, and/or experts, other than the council members, may be invited to participate on a temporary basis as ad hoc members. This applies if there are matters under consideration for which their opinions and votes are deemed appropriate for the meeting.

== Secretariat ==
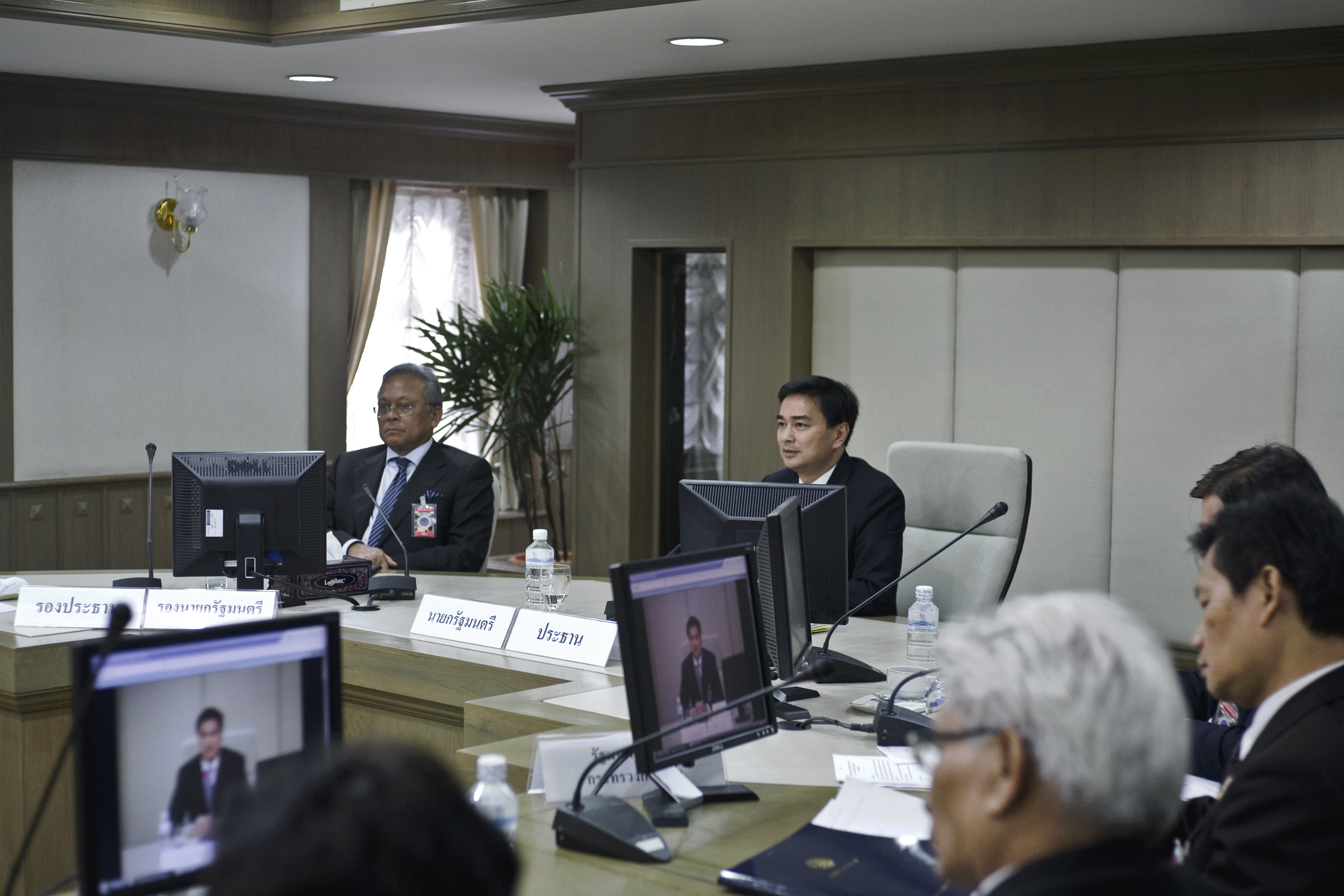
NSC meeting under Prime Minister Abhisit Vejjajiva at NSC Office in 2009

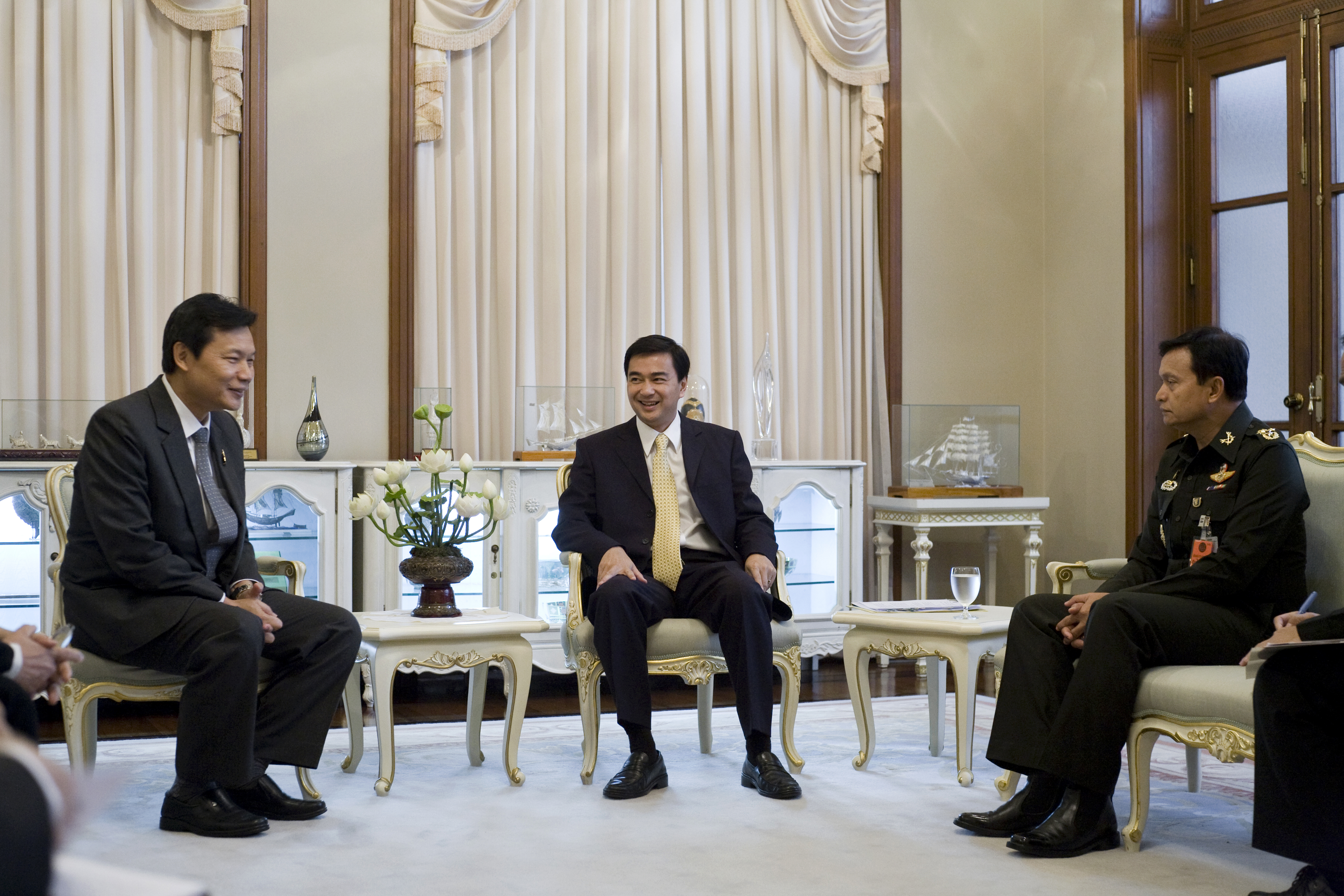
Secretary-General Thawil Pliensri (left) exchange the security situation with Prime Minister Abhisit Vejjajiva (center) at Thai-Khu-Fah Building, Government House in 2009

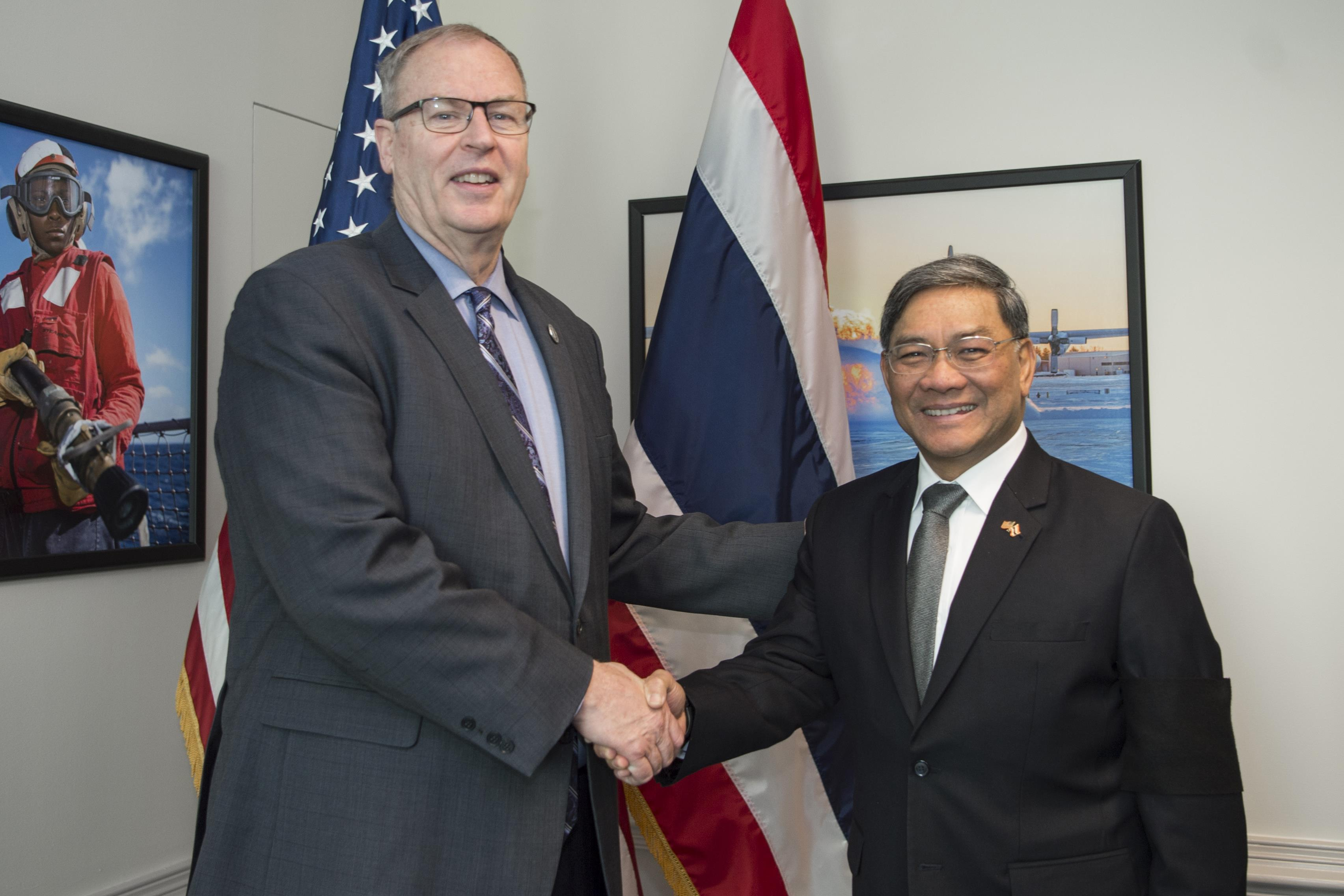
Secretary-General Thaweep Netniyom with Deputy Defense Secretary Robert O. Work at The Pentagon in 2017

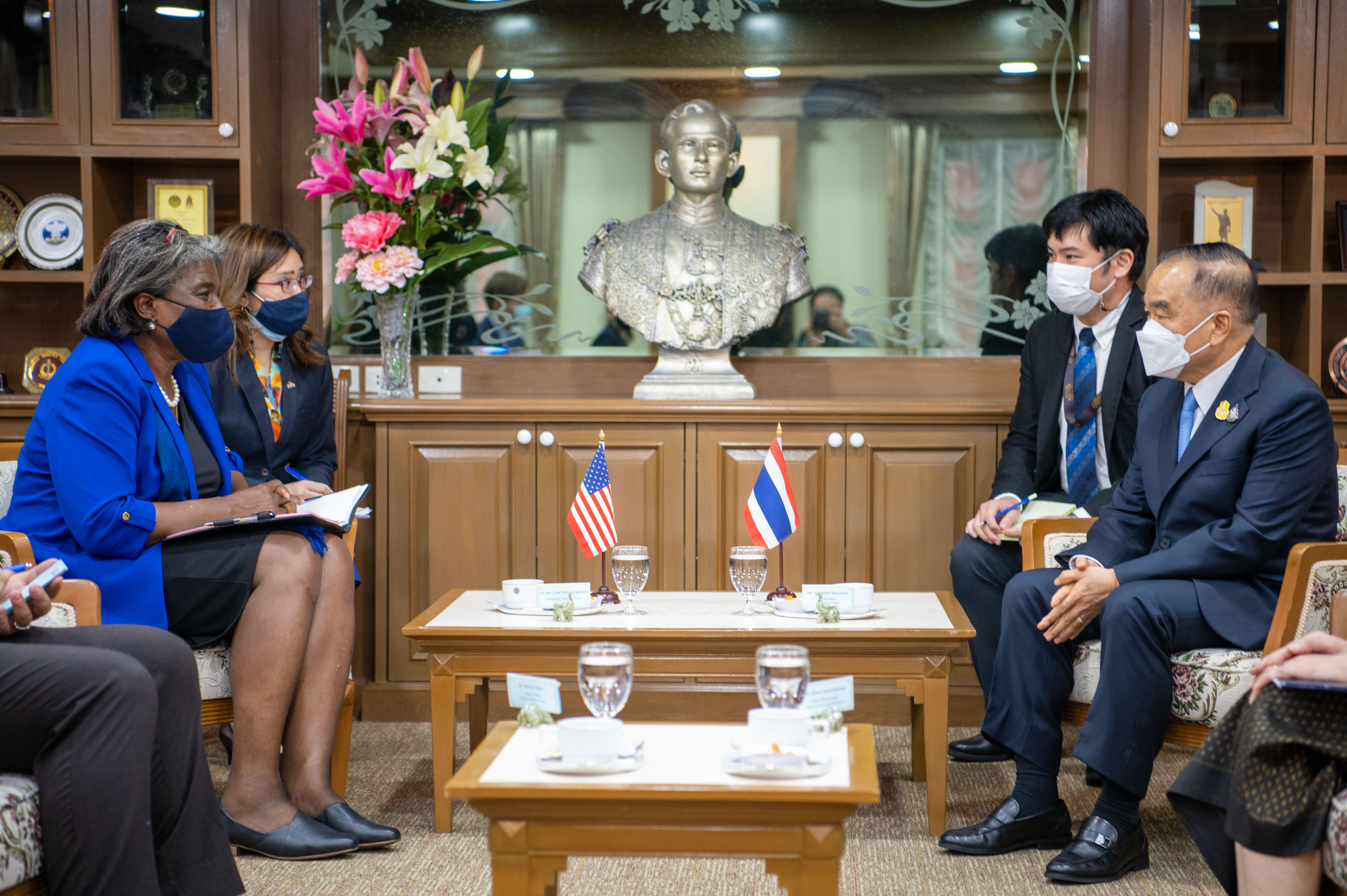
Secretary-General Natthaphon Narkphanit (right) met with U.S. Ambassador to UN Linda Thomas-Greenfield at NSC Office in 2021

The Office of the National Security Council (NSC Office) plays a vital role in Thailand's security efforts. It provides administrative support to the National Security Council and is responsible for crafting policies and action plans to address various threats to the nation's interests. This includes monitoring security assessments, analyzing strategic security changes, identifying threats, and evaluating national power in both domestic and international security contexts.

The office operates with a workforce of approximately 300 civil servants and government employees. To ensure operational diversity, the NSC directly recruited its core staff, while transferring others from various government agencies. The internal divisions are responsible for critical missions—including domestic and international security, intelligence, border and maritime affairs, the Southern border, transnational threats and security policy. Each division is led by a director with a rank equivalent to a ministerial-level deputy director-general.

The NSC office is situated within the Government House of Thailand.

=== Lists of NSC Secretary-General ===
The Secretary-General of the National Security Council is the highest executive of the Office of the National Security Council. Secretary-General of the National Security Council often serves as the counterpart of National Security Advisor of the United States.

#	Years	Name
1	1959–1962	Luang Wichitwathakan
2	1962–1968	Phraya Srivisanvaja
3	1968–1973	General Jira Vichitsongkram
4	1973–1974	General Lek Naewmalee
5	1974–1980	Air Chief Marshal Siddhi Savetsila
6	1980–1986	Squadron Leader Prasong Soonsiri
7	1986–1991	Suwit Suthanukul
8	1991–1996	General Jarun Kullawanit
9	1996–1998	General Boonsak Kamhaengrit
10	1998–2002	Kachadpai Burutpas
11	2002–2006	General Vinai Pattiyakul
12	2006–2007	Prakit Prachaonpachanuk
13	2007–2008	Lieutenant General Siripong Boonpat
14	2008–2011	Lieutenant General Surapol Puenaiyaka
15	2008–2011	Thawil Pliensri
-	2011–2012	Police General Wichien Podposri
-	2012–2014	Lieutenant General Paradon Patanathabutr
15(2)	2014	Thawil Pliensri
16	2014–2015	Anusit Kunakorn
17	2015–2017	General Thaweep Netniyom
18	2017–2019	General Wallop Raksanoh
19	2019–2020	General Somsak Roongsita
20	2020–2021	General Natthaphon Narkphanit
21	2021–2023	General Supoj Malaniyom
22	2024	Police General Roy Ingkhapairoj
23	2024–2026	Chatchai Bangchuad
24	2026–	General Chaiyapruek Duangprapat
25		
26		
27		
28		
29		
30		

#	Years	Name
31		
