= Alabaster (surname) =

Alabaster is an English surname, originally meaning someone who provided armed service with a crossbow/arbalest. Notable people with the surname include:

- Chaloner Alabaster (1838–1898) British consular officer in China (brother of Henry)
- C. Grenville Alabaster (1880–1958) Attorney General of Hong Kong
- Gren Alabaster (born 1933) New Zealand cricketer (brother of Jack)
- Henry Alabaster (1836–1884) British advisor to King Rama V of Thailand (brother of Chaloner)
- Jack Alabaster (1930–2024) New Zealand cricketer (brother of Gren)
- Martin Alabaster (born 1958) British Royal Navy admiral
- William Alabaster (1567–1640) poet, playwright, and religious writer
