= Pao Sarasin =

Thai politician and police officer

Police General Pao Sarasin เภา สารสิน
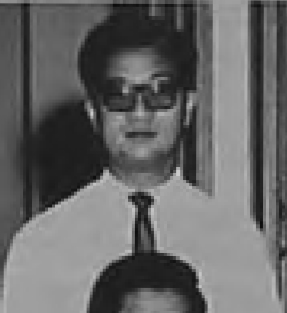

Deputy Prime Minister of Thailand
- In office 10 June 1992 – 22 September 1992
- Prime Minister: Anand Panyarachun
- In office 2 March 1991 – 23 March 1992
- Prime Minister: Anand Panyarachun

Minister of Interior
- In office 10 June 1992 – 22 September 1992
- Prime Minister: Anand Panyarachun
- Preceded by: Anan Kintha
- Succeeded by: Chavalit Yongchaiyudh

Director-General of the Royal Thai Police
- In office 1987–1989
- Preceded by: Narong Mahanon
- Succeeded by: Sawang Teerasawat

Personal details
- Born: 18 July 1929 Bangkok, Thailand
- Died: 7 March 2013 (aged 83) Bangkok, Thailand
- Spouse: Thawika Sarasin
- Children: 3
- Education: Vajiravudh College; Wilbraham Academy; Johns Hopkins University
- Profession: Policeman; Politician

Police General Pao Sarasin (c. 1929 – March 7, 2013) was a Thai politician and former police officer. Sarasin served as the Deputy Prime Minister of Thailand, as well as the country's Interior Minister, in 1992.

== Early life and education ==
Pao Sarasin was the son of former Prime Minister of Thailand Pote Sarasin and his wife, Thanpuying Siri Sarasin. He was one of three brothers, including Pong Sarasin and Arsa Sarasin. Pao Sarasin graduated from Vajiravudh College, a boarding school in Bangkok. He then moved to the United States, where he received a bachelor's degree in chemistry from Johns Hopkins University and a second bachelor's degree from the University of California in criminology.

== Careers ==
Sarasin enlisted the Royal Thai Police in 1954, rising to the rank of police general during his career. He served as the Chief of the force's Office of the Narcotics Control Board from 1978 until 1983. In 1987, he became the Chief of the Royal Thai Police.

In 1992, Sarasin briefly held the posts of Deputy Prime Minister and Interior Minister under the Royal Thai Army military junta and the post-coup government of former Prime Minister Anand Panyarachun.

During his later life, Sarasin served as the council presidents of both Mae Fah Luang University in Chiang Rai province and Khon Kaen University in Khon Kaen province.

== Death ==
Pao Sarasin died at Siriraj Hospital in Bangkok after a month-long hospitalization for a blood infection on March 7, 2013, at the age of 83. A royal bathing rite ceremony for Sarasin was held at the Wat Benchamabophit with Princess Maha Chakri Sirindhorn in attendance representing the royal family. He was survived by his wife, Thapuying Tawika Sarasin, and three sons, including Thai television host, Kanit Sarasin.

== Honours ==
=== Foreign honours ===
- Malaysia : Honorary Commander of the Order of Loyalty to the Crown of Malaysia (P.S.M.) (1988)
- Malaysia : Honorary Commander of the Order of the Defender of the Realm (P.M.N.) (1993)

== See also ==
- Sarasin family

Political offices
Vacant Title last held by Booneua Prasertsuwan; Chalermpan Srivikorn; Kosol Krairerk; Mana Rattanakoset; Arthit Kamlang-ek	Deputy Prime Minister of Thailand; 1991–1992 with Sango Aunakul (1991–1992); Meechai Ruchuphan (1991–1992)	Vacant Title next held by Meechai Ruchuphan; Narong Wongwan; Somboon Rahong; Montree Pongpanich; Samak Sundaravej
Preceded by Anan Kintha	Minister of Interior; 1992	Vacant Title next held by Chavalit Yongchaiyudh
Police appointments
Preceded by Narong Mahanon	Director-General of the Royal Thai Police; 1987–1989	Succeeded by Sawang Teerasawat
Civic offices
Preceded by Pramook Sawasdimongkol	Secretary-General of the Narcotics Control Board; 1977–1982	Succeeded by Chavalit Yodmani
