= Piyamavadi =

Thai princess

Piyamavadi Sri Bajarindra Mata
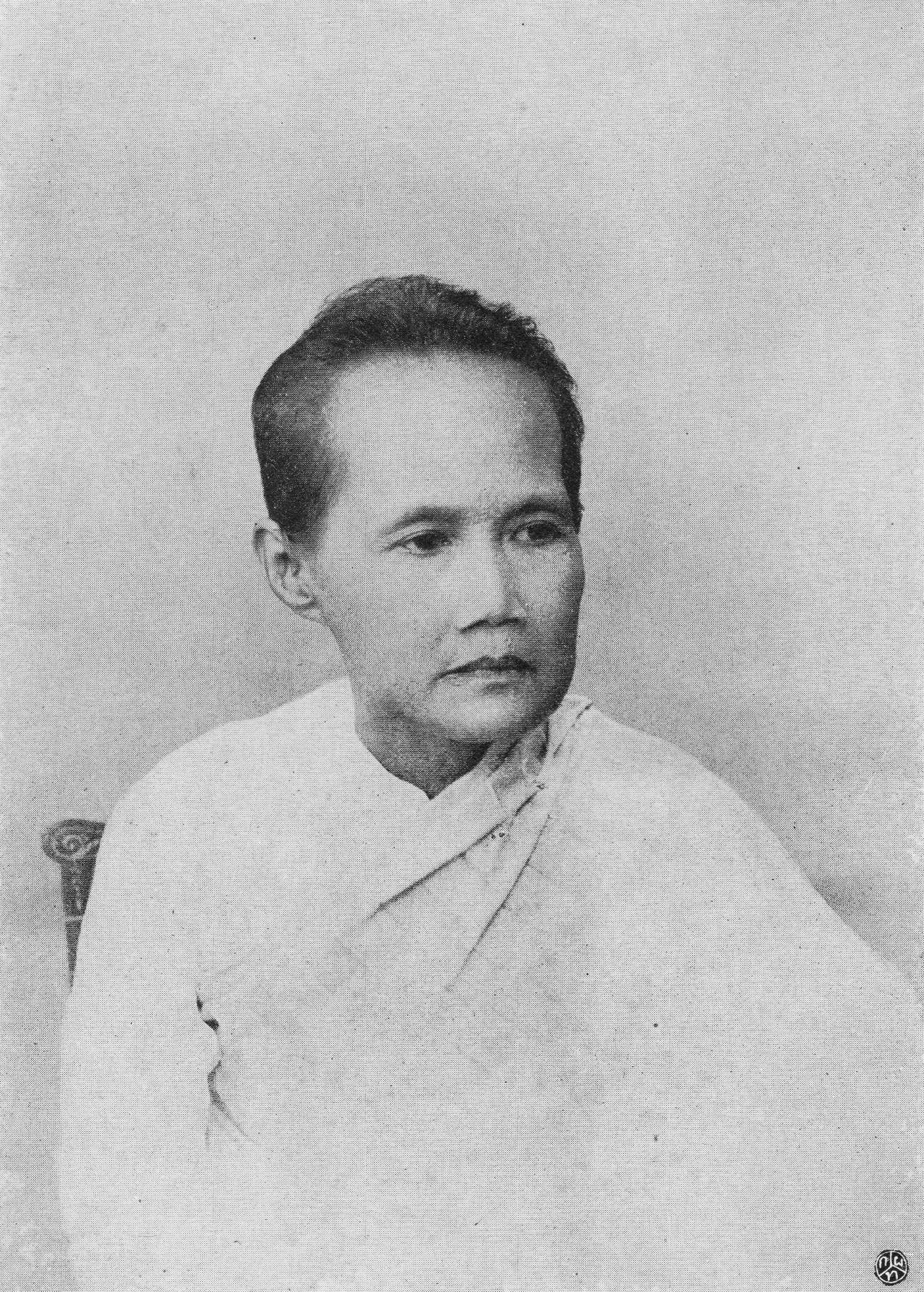
- Born: Piam; 5 March 1838; Siam
- Died: 3 April 1904 (aged 66); Bangkok, Siam
- Spouse: Mongkut (Rama IV)
- Issue: Prince Unakan Ananta Norajaya; Prince Devawongse Varopakarn; Queen Sunandha Kumariratana; Queen Savang Vadhana; Queen Saovabha Phongsri; Prince Svasti Sobhana
- House: Chakri Dynasty
- Father: Lord Asa Samdaeng (Taeng Suchritakul)
- Mother: Dame Sucharitthamrong (Nag Sucharitakul)

Princess Piyamavadi Sri Bajarindra Mata (Thai: สมเด็จพระปิยมาวดี ศรีพัชรินทรมาตา; RTGS: Piyamawadi Siphatcharin Mata) or Chao Khun Chom Manda Piam (Thai: เจ้าคุณจอมมารดาเปี่ยม) née Piam Sucharitakul (Thai: เปี่ยม สุจริตกุล; RTGS: Piam Sucharitakun), was one of the royal wives of King Mongkut. All three of her daughters became queens.

Her father was the original caretaker of King Mongkut while he ordained, and he passed in the first year of the reign of King Mongkut. Thus the King patronized his family, bestowed the title Thao (Dame) to his wife, gave her the duties, and sponsored his children.

When her grandson, Crown Prince Maha Vajiravudh (Rama VI) acceded to the throne to be King Vajiravudh, he promoted her become to the princess of Thailand as Her Royal Highness Princess Piyamavadi Sri Bajarindra Mata (meaning: Piam, Princess Mother of Queen Sri Bajarindra). after she died.

She had six children with King Mongkut:

1. Prince Unakan Ananta Norajaya
2. Prince Devan Uthayawongse (Later Prince Devavongse Varoprakarn)
3. Princess Sunandha Kumariratana (Later Queen Sunandha Kumariratana)
4. Princess Savang Vadhana (Later Queen Sri Savarindira, the Queen Grandmother)
5. Princess Saovabha Bongsi (Later Queen Sri Bajarindra, the Queen Mother)
6. Prince Svasti Sobhana (Later Prince Svastivatana Visishta)
