= Natthaphon Narkphanit =

Thai politician and military officer (born 1961)

General Natthaphon Narkphanit MVM PCh
- ณัฐพล นาคพาณิชย์
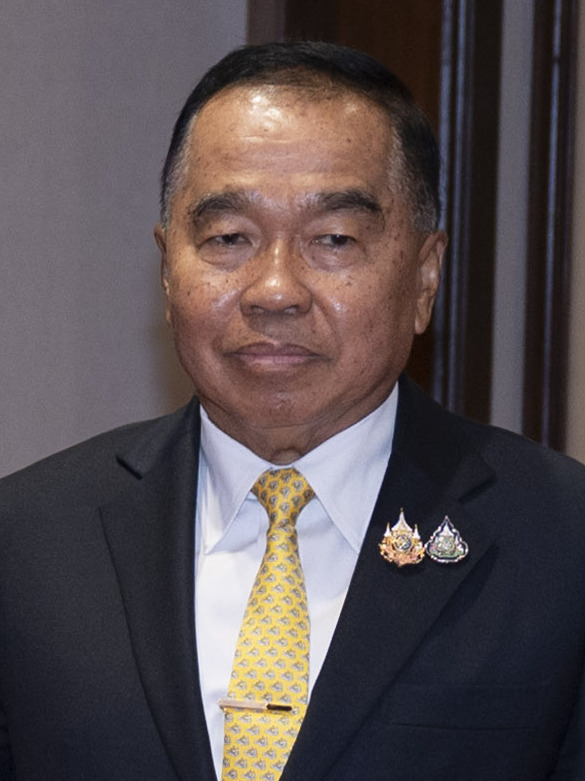
- Natthaphon in 2024

Minister of Defence
- In office 19 September 2025 – 30 March 2026; Acting: 30 June – 19 September 2025
- Prime Minister: Paetongtarn Shinawatra; Suriya Juangroongruangkit (acting); Phumtham Wechayachai (acting); Anutin Charnvirakul
- Preceded by: Phumtham Wechayachai
- Succeeded by: Adul Boonthamcharoen

Deputy Minister of Defence
- In office 3 September 2024 – 19 September 2025
- Prime Minister: Paetongtarn Shinawatra
- Minister: Phumtham Wechayachai
- Preceded by: Chaichan Changmongkol
- Succeeded by: Adul Boonthamcharoen

Secretary-General of the National Security Council
- In office 1 October 2020 – 30 September 2021
- Prime Minister: Prayut Chan-o-cha
- Preceded by: Somsak Roongsita
- Succeeded by: Supoj Malaniyom

Personal details
- Born: 13 February 1961 (age 65) Ratchaburi, Thailand
- Party: Independent
- Spouse: Vanida Narkphanit
- Children: 2
- Education: Chulachomklao Royal Military Academy

Military service
- Allegiance: Thailand
- Branch/service: Royal Thai Army
- Years of service: 1988–2020
- Rank: General

Natthaphon Narkphanit (Thai: ณัฐพล นาคพาณิชย์, RTGS: Natthaphon Nakphanit; born 13 February 1961) is a Thai politician and retired military officer. He was recognized for his work in national security management under the government of General Prayut Chan-o-cha in solving the problem of the spread of COVID-19 and dealing with political rallies in 2020–2021 Thai protests that affect security.

== Early life and education ==
Natthaphon Nakphanit was born on February 13, 1961. He graduated from the Armed Forces Academies Preparatory School (Class 20) and then Chulachomklao Royal Military Academy (Class 31). He also studied at the Royal Thai Army Command and General Staff College and the National Defence College of Thailand.

== Career ==
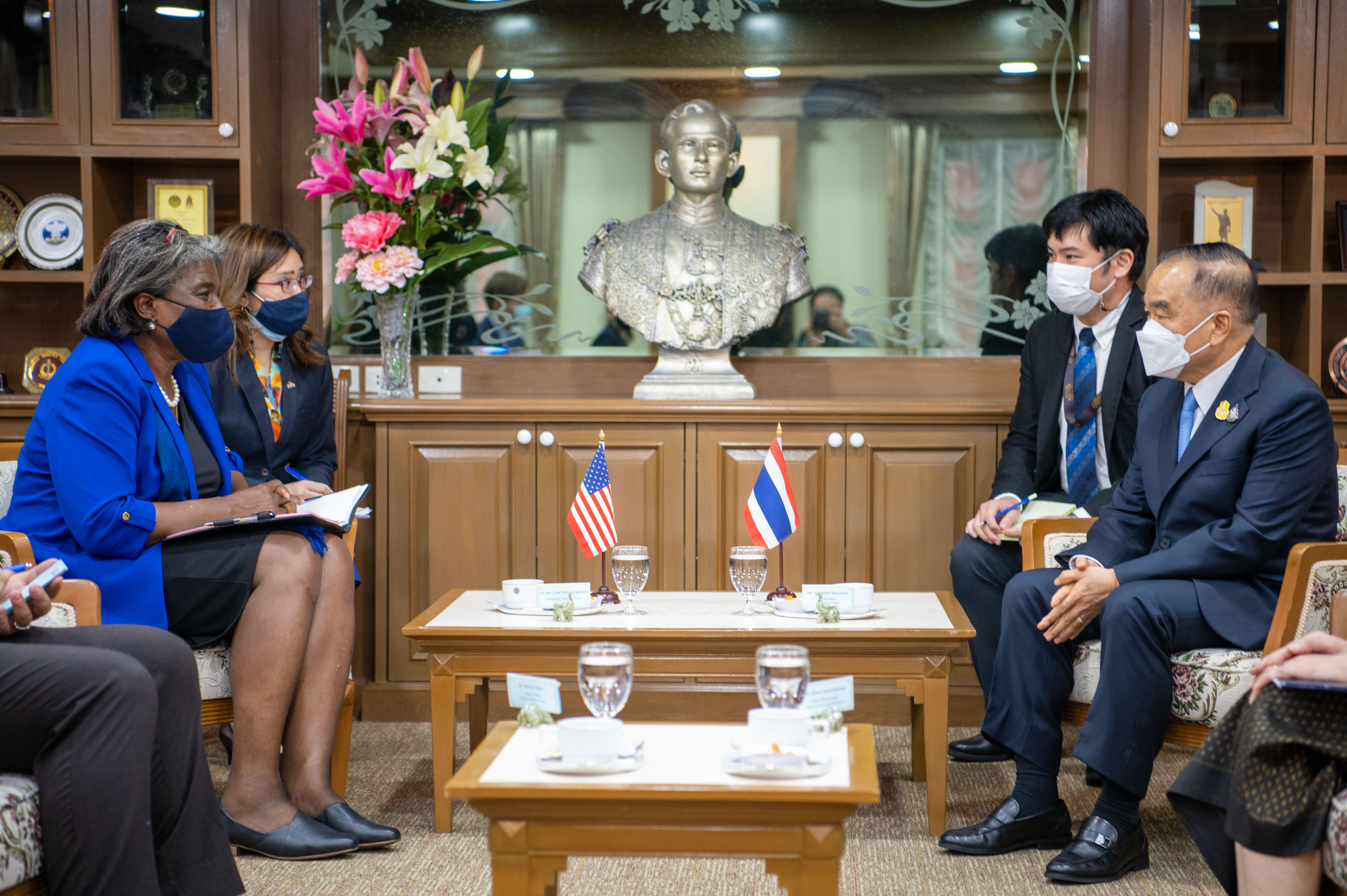
NSC Secretary-General Nattaphon (right) with US ambassador to the UN, Linda Thomas-Greenfield discussed working together on the COVID-19 response, human rights, and regional humanitarian challenges in 2021

Natthaphon previously served in the Royal Thai Army as a Light Weapons Company Commander of 2nd Infantry Battalion, 31st Infantry Regiment, King Bhumibol's Guard in 1988, later became a teacher at the Royal Thai Army Command and General Staff College and Royal Thai Army War College.

He was the Director of the Directorate of Operations in 2015 and became the Deputy Chief of Staff of the Army in 2016.

The following year he became Chief of Staff of the Army and was Deputy Commander-in-Chief of the Royal Thai Army from 2018 to 2020, then transferred to be Secretary-General of the National Security Council in 2020. He played a huge role in solving the problem of the spread of COVID-19 pandemic in Thailand as Vice Chairman of the Ad hoc committee considering the relaxation of enforcement of measures to prevent and stop the spread of COVID-19 and is also the main leader in the Centre for COVID-19 Situation Administration (CCSA). He is also the one who developed the role of the National Security Council to be able to deal with a wider variety of threats to the country, such as the threat from COVID-19.

== Political career ==
After retiring from government service, he was appointed Advisor to the Prime Minister Prayut Chan-o-cha.

In September 2023, he was appointed Secretary to the Minister of Defense Sutin Klungsang and a year later, he was appointed Deputy Minister of Defense in the Paetongtarn Shinawatra Government.

Natthaphon played a significant role as a military leader in the government's efforts to resolve the 2025 Cambodia–Thailand border conflict. He tried to get Thailand and Cambodia to use bilateral negotiation mechanisms to resolve the issue, although he was criticized for being indecisive in the matter.

On September 19, 2025, Natthaphon was appointed Minister of Defense in the Anutin Charnvirakul government.

== Honours ==
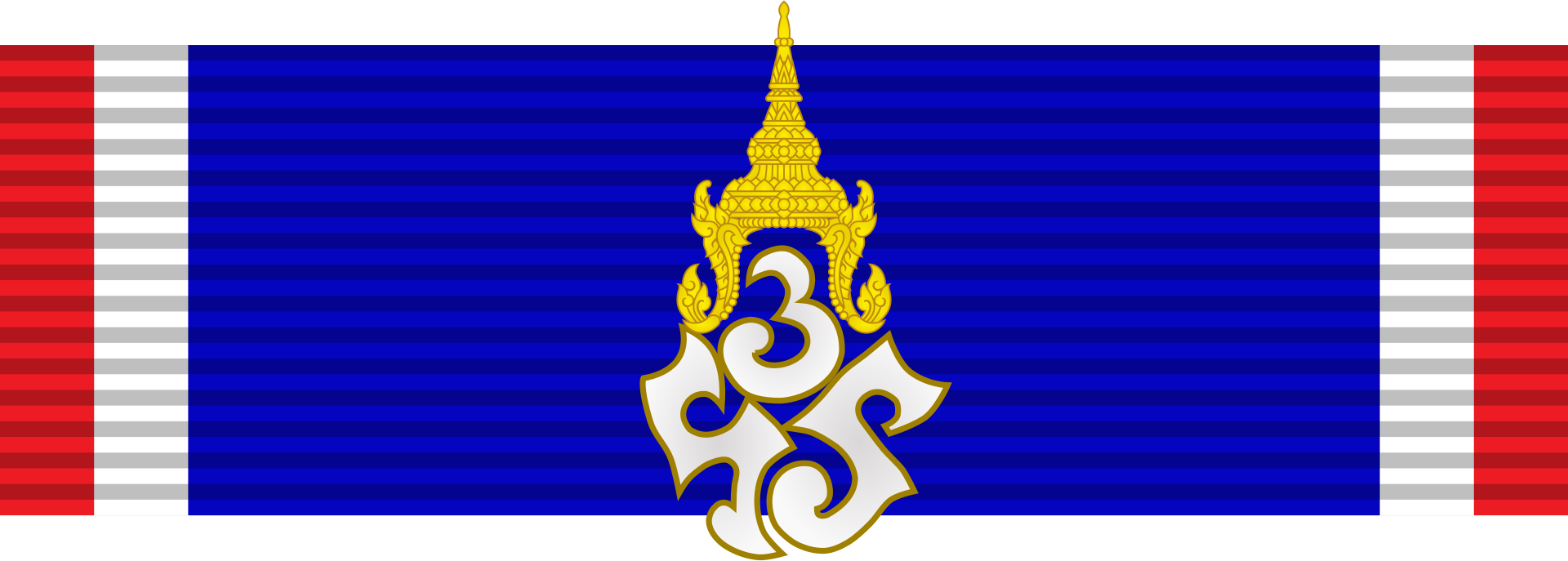
- 2020 – Knight Grand Cordon (Special Class) of The Most Noble Order of the Crown of Thailand
- 2014 – Knight Grand Cross (First Class) of The Most Exalted Order of the White Elephant
- 1986 – Freemen Safeguarding Medal (Second Class, Second Category)
- 1988 – Border Service Medal
- 1996 – Chakra Mala Medal
