= Pote Sarasin =

Prime Minister of Thailand (1905–2000)

Pote Sarasin PCh MPCh MVM
- พจน์ สารสิน
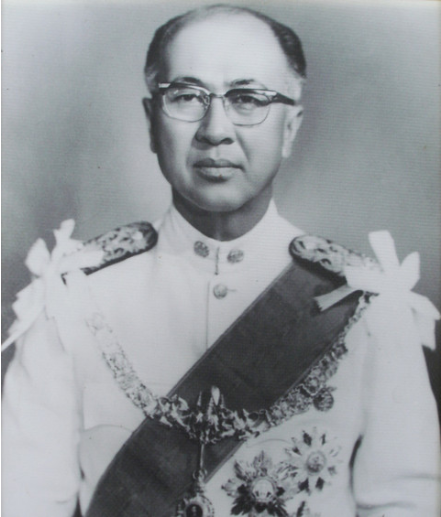
- Pote in 1968

9th Prime Minister of Thailand
- In office 21 September 1957 – 1 January 1958
- Monarch: Bhumibol Adulyadej
- Preceded by: Plaek Phibunsongkhram; Sarit Thanarat (de facto)
- Succeeded by: Thanom Kittikachorn

Deputy Prime Minister of Thailand
- In office 9 March 1969 – 17 November 1971
- Prime Minister: Thanom Kittikachorn
Ministerial offices 1949–1971
Minister of National Development
In office 11 December 1963 – 17 November 1971
| Prime Minister | Thanom Kittikachorn |
| Preceded by | Sahorda Weerathien |
| Succeeded by | Office abolished |
Minister of Commerce
In office 10 February 1968 – 7 March 1969
| Prime Minister | Thanom Kittikachorn |
| Preceded by | Sunthorn Hongladarom |
| Succeeded by | Boonchana Atthakorn |
Minister of Finance
In office 23 September 1957 – 26 September 1957
| Prime Minister | Himself |
| Preceded by | Warakan Bancha |
| Succeeded by | Serm Vinicchayakul |
Minister of Foreign Affairs
In office 13 October 1949 – 1 March 1950
| Prime Minister | Plaek Phibunsongkhram |
| Preceded by | Plaek Phibunsongkhram |
| Succeeded by | Warakan Bancha |

Secretary General of SEATO
- In office 10 January 1958 – 13 December 1963
- Preceded by: William Worth (Acting)
- Succeeded by: William Worth (Acting)
- In office 5 September 1957 – 22 September 1957
- Preceded by: Office established
- Succeeded by: William Worth (Acting)

Personal details
- Born: Wee Pote (Note: At that time, Thailand did not have surnames, Wee is Hainanese surname.); 25 March 1905 Bangkok, Krung Thep, Siam (now Bang Rak, Bangkok, Thailand)
- Died: 28 September 2000 (aged 95) Bumrungrad International Hospital, Watthana, Bangkok, Thailand
- Party: United Thai People's Party
- Spouse: Thanpuying Siri Sarasin
- Children: 6
- Education: Wilbraham Academy
- Profession: Lawyer; diplomat; politician

Pote Sarasin (Note: Thai: พจน์ สารสิน; RTGS: Phot Sarasin; pronounced [pʰót sǎː.rā.sǐn]) (25 March 1905 – 28 September 2000) was Prime Minister of Thailand from September 1957 to December 1957. He belonged to the influential Sarasin family, and also served as foreign minister from 1949 to 1950, as well as ambassador to the United States. In September 1957, when Sarit Thanarat seized power in a military coup, he appointed Pote as the Prime Minister of Thailand. He resigned in December 1957. Pote also served as the first Secretary General of the Southeast Asia Treaty Organization from September 1957 until 1963.

== Early life and education ==
Pote Sarasin was born in 1905 to a Hainanese Thai Chinese family of rice merchants and landowners in Bangkok. His father Wee Thian Hee was a doctor and rice merchant. Pote attended Bangkok Christian College before being sent to Wilbraham Academy, a boarding school in Wilbraham, Massachusetts, United States. He later studied law in the United Kingdom and was called to the bar at Middle Temple in London. From 1933 to 1945, he practised as an attorney in Bangkok.

== Political career ==
A close friend of the temporarily disempowered prime minister Plaek Phibunsongkhram, Pote provided financial aid to the field marshal after his release from prison in 1946. In return, Phibun had Pote appointed deputy minister of foreign affairs in 1948.

As foreign minister, Pote was a wilful opponent of Phibun's attempts to recognise the French-backed Bảo Đại of Vietnam, a stance that had the full support of parliament, the press, and much of the government. Pote recognised Bảo Đại's lack of popular appeal, doubted any chance of success, and suspected that the Vietnamese might turn hostile, explaining to a New York Times reporter that "if they [the Thais] backed Bảo Đại and he failed, the animosity of the people of the country Vietnam would be turned against the Siamese." In the end, Phibun discarded months of Foreign Ministry recommendations and, on 28 February 1950, issued formal recognition of the royal governments of Laos, Cambodia and Vietnam. Embittered, Pote resigned. It was the only time a Thai foreign minister resigned on a matter of principle. Shortly afterward, he became ambassador to Washington once again.

On 21 September 1957, Sarit chose Pote to head the coup-installed government, mainly because the American-educated diplomat had good relations with the Americans. Under him, largely free and fair elections were held in December. He resigned from the premiership that same month to resume his post as Secretary General of SEATO.

== Family ==
Pote was a scion of the Sarasin family, one of Bangkok's oldest and wealthiest assimilated Chinese families. The Sarasins had always cultivated good relations with the bureaucratic elite of the 19th century, and by the early 1950s held substantial interests in real estate and rice trading. His father, Wee Thian Hee, was the son of a Hainanese doctor and pharmacist who had immigrated to Bangkok in the early 19th century.

Pote had three sons: Pong, deputy prime minister of Thailand and a leading businessman, Police General Pao, who once served as the Chief of the Royal Thai Police, and Arsa, who, like his father, was the foreign ministers of Thailand and also served as the late King Bhumibol's Principal Private Secretary. All three sons—Pong, Arsa and Pao—have served as Deputy Prime Ministers of Thailand.

== Notes ==
Political offices
| Preceded by Plaek Phibunsongkhram | Prime Minister of Thailand; 1957 | Succeeded by Thanom Kittikachorn |
