= Prasong Soonsiri =

Thai politician

Squadron Leader Prasong Soonsiri
- ประสงค์ สุ่นศิริ
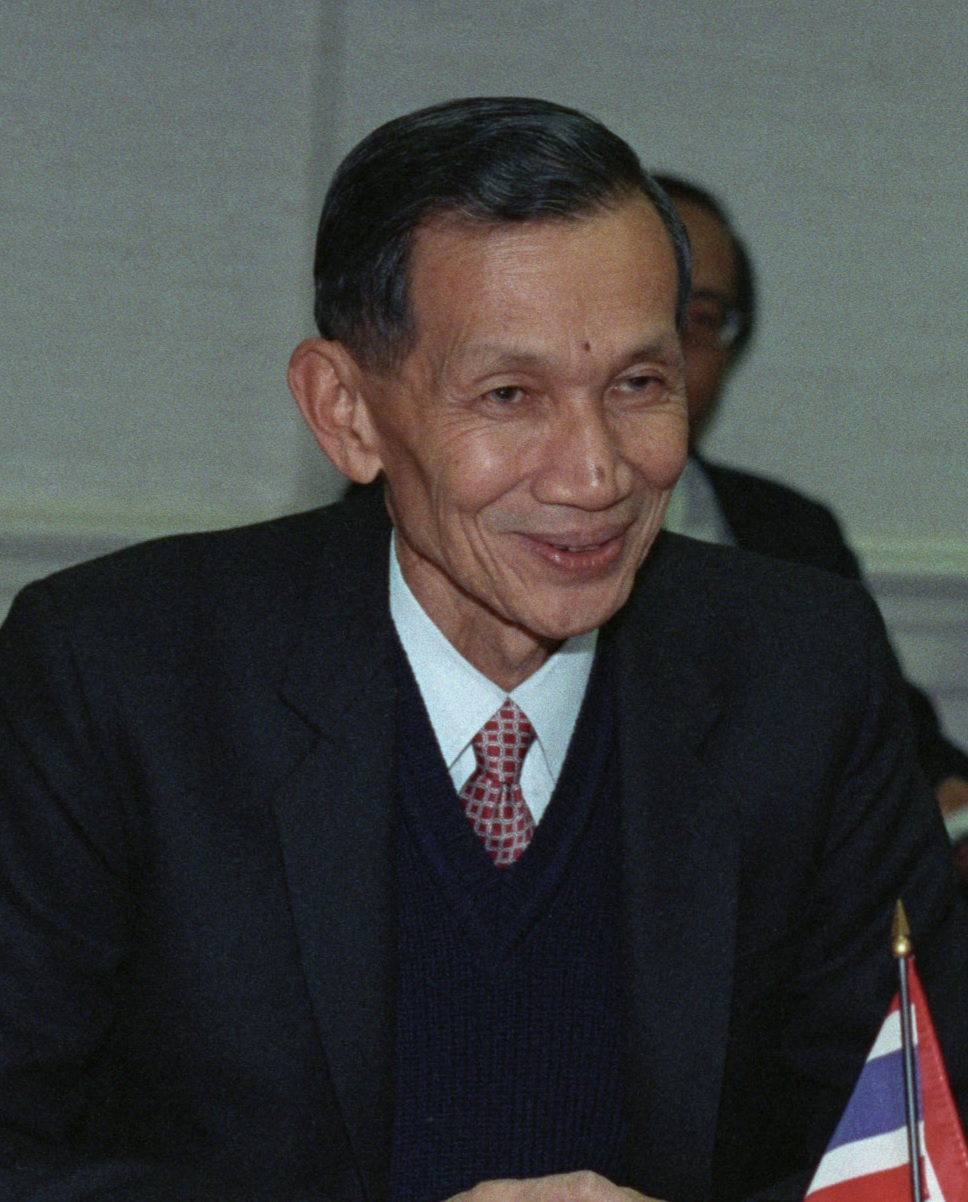
- Prasong Soonsiri in 1993

Minister of Foreign Affairs
- In office 2 October 1992 – 25 October 1994
- Prime Minister: Chuan Leekpai
- Preceded by: Arsa Sarasin
- Succeeded by: Thaksin Shinawatra

Secretary-General to the Prime Minister
- In office 15 August 1986 – 4 August 1988
- Prime Minister: Prem Tinsulanonda
- Preceded by: Chantarakub Sirisut
- Succeeded by: Panya Singhasakda

Secretary-General of the National Security Council
- In office 31 January 1980 – 14 August 1986
- Prime Minister: Prem Tinsulanonda
- Preceded by: Siddhi Savetsila
- Succeeded by: Suwit Suthanukul

Personal details
- Born: 11 August 1927 (age 99) Ratchaburi, Thailand
- Party: New Aspiration Party
- Spouse: Sukon Soonsiri
- Education: Bansomdejchaopraya Rajabhat University

Military service
- Allegiance: Thailand
- Branch/service: Royal Thai Air Force
- Rank: Squadron Leader

Prasong Soonsiri (Thai: ประสงค์ สุ่นศิริ, RTGS: Prasong Sunsiri; born 11 August 1927) is a Thai politician, and former Royal Thai Air Force squadron leader, Thai Foreign Minister, and Secretary-General of the National Security Council.

== Education and careers ==
Prasong started his civil service as a teacher at Ratchaburi boarding school later transferred to military service at the Directorate of Intelligence, Royal Thai Air Force to the rank of a Pilot Officer. He was a close confidant following Siddhi Savetsila to the Air Force Security Bureau. From then in 1966, he received a scholarship to study intelligence at the United States Air Force.

Upon returning, he moved to the Office of the National Security Council and in 1980, was the Secretary-General of the National Security Council, following the retirement of Siddhi Savetsila. In 1986, he resigned from the Secretary-General of the National Security Council, to be Secretary-General to the Prime Minister Prem Tinsulanonda.

His image of the will of the intelligence expert resulting in the nickname of "CIA of Thailand" and got another nickname, "Co-Prime Minister" from Prem's secretary-general.

== Critics ==
Prasong has been a long-time critic of Thaksin Shinawatra since Thaksin's entry into politics in 1994. Thaksin joined the Palang Dharma Party in late 1994 under the invitation of Chamlong Srimuang, who had just reclaimed the position of party leader from Boonchu Rojanastien. In a subsequent purge of Boonchu-affiliated PDP Cabinet ministers, Thaksin was appointed Foreign Minister, replacing Prasong Soonsiri.

Prasong was a central figure in the 19 September 2006 Thai military coup that overthrew Thaksin Shinawatra's elected government. Prasong had developed plans for a military coup as early as July 2006. A palace insider and favorite of King Bhumibol Adulyadej, Prasong was later appointed by the junta to the National Legislative Assembly.

== Honours ==
Prasong has received the following decorations and awards in the Honours System of Thailand:

- Knight Grand Cordon (Special Class) of the Most Noble Order of the Crown of Thailand
- Knight Grand Cordon (Special Class) of the Most Exalted Order of the White Elephant
- Grand Companion of the Most Illustrious Order of Chula Chom Klao

== See also ==
- 2006 Thailand coup
