= Kannabhorn Bejaratana =

Princess of Siam, daughter of Chulalongkorn

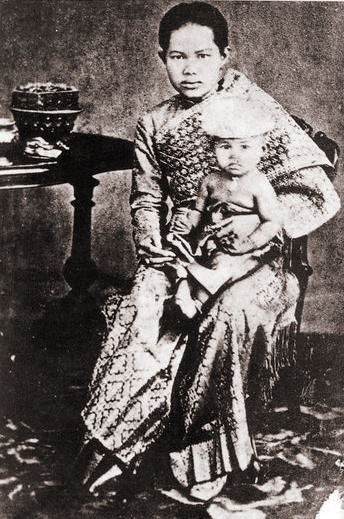
- Princess Kannabhorn Bejaratana with her mother, Queen Sunanda Kumariratana
- Born: 12 August 1878; Grand Palace, Bangkok, Siam
- Died: 31 May 1880 (aged 1); Pak Kret, Nonthaburi, Siam
Names
- Her Royal Highness Princess Kannabhorn Bejaratana Sohbhandasaniyalak Akaravorarajakumari
- House: Chakri dynasty
- Father: Chulalongkorn (Rama V)
- Mother: Sunanda Kumariratana

Kannabhorn Bejaratana (Thai: กรรณาภรณ์เพ็ชรรัตน์; RTGS: Kannaphonphetcharat; 12 August 1878 – 31 May 1880), was a Princess of Siam (later Thailand). She was a member of the Siamese Royal Family. She was a daughter of King Chulalongkorn. She was given her full name, Kannabhorn Bejaratana Sohbhangdasaniyalak Akaravorarajakumari (Thai: กรรณาภรณ์เพ็ชรรัตน์ โสภางคทัศนิยลักษณ์ อรรควรราชกุมารี; RTGS: Kannaphonphetcharat Sophangthatsaniyalak Akkhaworaratchakumari) by her father.

Her mother was Queen Sunanda Kumariratana, Queen Consort, who was also a half-sister of King Chulalongkorn. She drowned with her mother and her unborn sibling when the royal boat capsized while on the way to the Bang Pa-In Royal Palace. It is a common myth that commoners were unable to touch the queen on pain of death, preventing the rescue of the princess and her mother; this is false. The King's diary records that boatmen dived into the water, pulled the queen and her daughter from the entangling curtains, and carried them to another boat, where attendants worked in vain to resuscitate them.

Her royal cremation ceremony was held together with her mother's at Sanam Luang, presided over by King Chulalongkorn.
