= Pong Sarasin =

Thai businessman and politician (1927–2021)

Pong Sarasin MPCh MWM ThChW
- พงส์ สารสิน
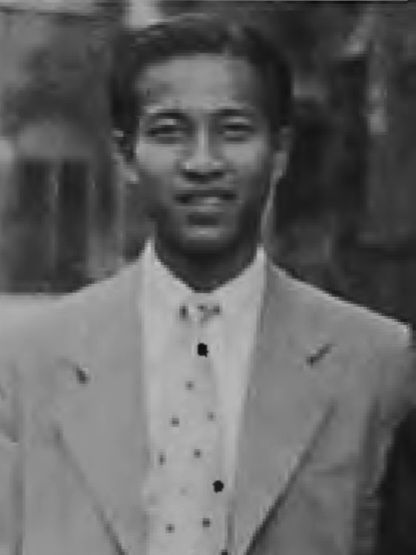

Deputy Prime Minister of Thailand
- In office 4 August 1988 – 9 December 1990
- Prime Minister: Chatichai Choonhavan
- In office 5 August 1986 – 3 August 1988
- Prime Minister: Prem Tinsulanonda

Personal details
- Born: 16 July 1927 Bangkok, Thailand
- Died: 3 February 2021 (aged 93) Bangkok, Thailand
- Party: Social Action Party
- Spouse: Malinee Sarasin
- Children: 3
- Profession: Politician

Pong Sarasin (Thai: พงส์ สารสิน; 16 July 1927 – 3 February 2021) was a Thai businessman and politician, who served under Major General Chatichai Choonhavan's cabinet, acting as Deputy Prime Minister along with General Tienchai Sirisumpan in 1988.

== Family ==
Pong was a scion of the wealthy Sarasin family, one of Bangkok's oldest assimilated Thai-Chinese business clans. Pong, although he was a leading member of Thailand's Social Action Party, is frequently associated with his politically active family: Pong was the son of former Prime Minister and SEATO Secretary-General Pote Sarasin; he is the brother of former Police Chief General and Interior Minister Pao Sarasin, as well as the brother of Arsa Sarasin, the former Foreign Minister and chief secretary of late King Bhumibol Adulyadej's office.

== Careers ==
Pong started working at Bank of Thailand but resigned to work at the Department of Administrative Intelligence in the middle of the years 1952 to 1957, before resigning to work for Thainamthip Co. Ltd., where he started as an assistant manager. Later, Pong entered politics by becoming a member of the National Legislative Assembly in 1973 and later becoming a Senator in 1976. Later, together with Kukrit Pramoj he founded the Social Action Party and served as party secretary in 1984, running for the election of Khon Kaen House of Representatives in the 1986 election and was elected consecutively until 1988 for a total of 2 terms.

== Honours ==
- Grand Commander of the Most Illustrious Order of Chula Chom Klao (ท.จ.ว.)
- Knight Grand Cordon (Special Class) of the Most Exalted Order of the White Elephant (ม.ป.ช.)
- Knight Grand Cordon (Special Class) of the Most Noble Order of the Crown of Thailand (ม.ว.ม.)

== Death ==
Pong Sarasin died on 3 February 2021 with an old disease at the age of 93.
