= Unakan Ananta Norajaya =

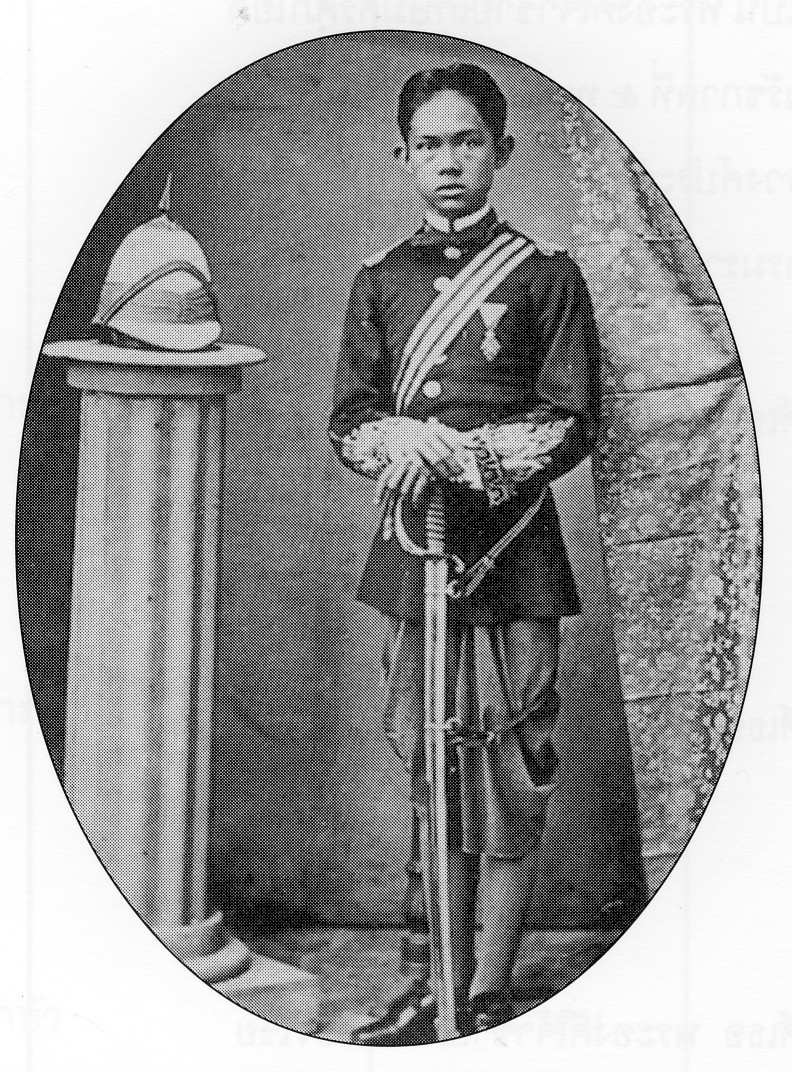
- Born: 20 February 1856; Bangkok, Siam
- Died: March 29, 1873 (aged 17); Bangkok, Siam
Names
- His Royal Highness Prince Unakan Ananta Norajaya
- House: Chakri Dynasty
- Father: Mongkut (Rama IV)
- Mother: Piam Sucharitakul

Unakan Ananta Norajaya (Thai: พระเจ้าบรมวงศ์เธอ พระองค์เจ้าอุณากรรณอนันตนรไชย; RTGS: Phrachao Borom wong Phra Ong Chao Unakan Ananta Norachai; 20 February 1856 – 29 March 1873) His Royal Highness Prince Ananta Norajaya he was a son of King Mongkut (Rama IV) and consort Piam Sucharitakul.

He had the same parents as the three queens of King Chulalongkorn: Queen Sunandha Kumariratana, Queen Savang Vadhana and Queen Saovabha Bhongsi. Unakan Ananta Norajaya was the 29nd child of King Mongkut.

He have a one son :

His serene Highness Prince (name not known) was born on July 17, 1873, and died on July 19, 1874, when he was only 1 year old.

Prince Unakan Ananta Norajaya died on 29 March 1873 at the age 17.
