= Thian Hee Sarasin =

Thai doctor (1848–1925)

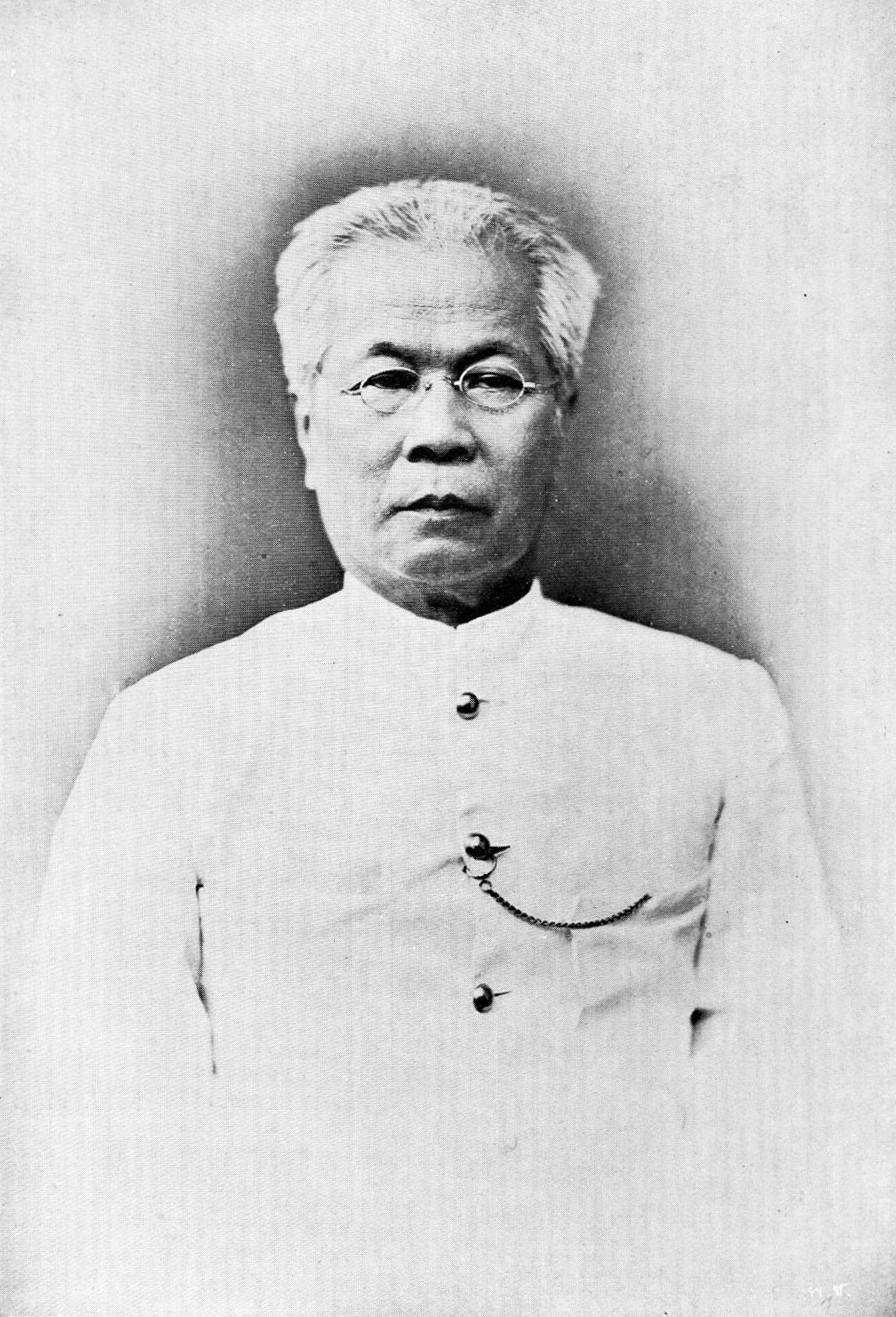
Thian Hee

Thian Hee Sarasin (Thai: เทียนฮี้ สารสิน, romanised: Thianhi Sarasin; 1848–1925) (Note: Chinese name: Wee Thian Hee (黄天喜)) was a Chinese-Thai medical doctor and merchant. Born in Thailand to a Chinese father, he came from a line of wealthy rice traders and pharmacists who had emigrated from Hainan Province, China, to reside in the largely mercantile Thonburi across the river from Bangkok. At a young age he was taken to the US by a missionary to pursue his studies. He is noted as being the first Thai person to have studied in the US. He finished his studies in medicine at Columbia University in 1871, and returned to Thailand as the country's first ever medical doctor.

He became a prominent military doctor and accompanied the army on expeditions to Laos under Chaophraya Surasakmontri during the Haw Wars of 1865–1890. Malaria proved to be a more formidable foe than the Haw and Thian Hee was largely occupied with administering quinine to afflicted troops. A photograph now on view at Vimanmek Mansion depicts Thian Hee handing the last bottle of quinine to the commanding general to prove the scarcity of their supplies. Among his activities in Laos as part of an occupational force was the imposition of a partially successful ban on the practice of using witch doctors and witchcraft to heal the local populace of illnesses.

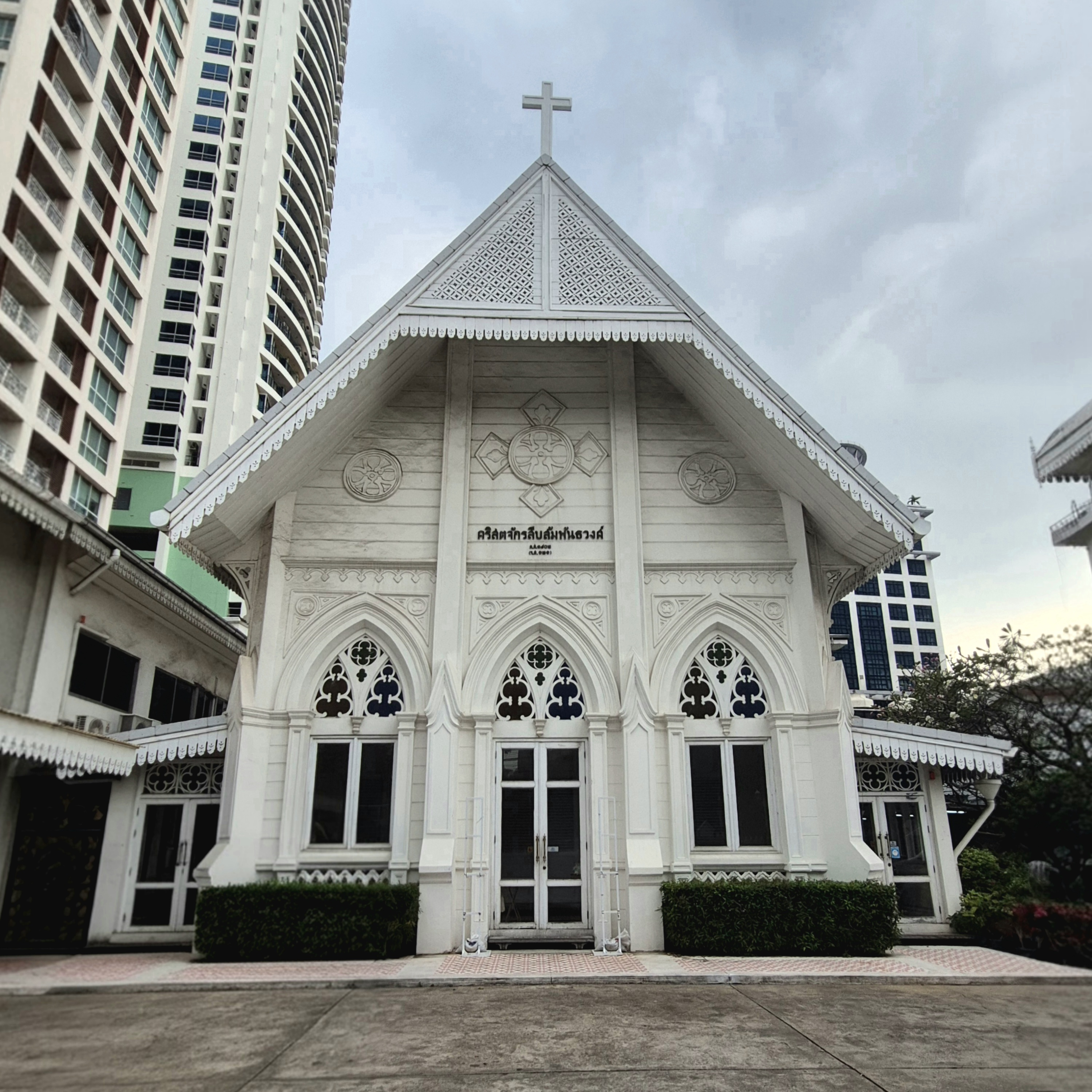
Suebsampantawong Church

Thian Hee later returned to his family profession as a rice trader and became one of the country's most influential merchants. He acted as a financial advisor to Queen Savang Vadhana, often serving as intermediary between the palace and the generally insular Chinese merchant community. He amassed wealth as a co-founder of Siam Cement, a conglomerate now the second largest company in Thailand. As an act of gratitude to the missionary who had supported him as a child, Thian Hee funded the construction of Thailand's fourth Presbyterian church, Suebsamphanthawong Church, in 1902 on his own plot of land in the Si Lom subdistrict of Bangkok. In 1925, following his death, he was interred next to the church in a mausoleum in the family cemetery.

Thian Hee was the founder of the influential Sarasin family. One of his sons, Pote Sarasin, became the first secretary general of SEATO (Southeast Asia Treaty Organisation) and the ninth prime minister of Thailand.

Thian Hee's official title was Phraya Sarasinsawamiphakh. The title of "phraya" is now obsolete. It was the second-highest feudal title a person could be granted and is the equivalent of "marquis" in the West.
