= Devawongse Varodaya =

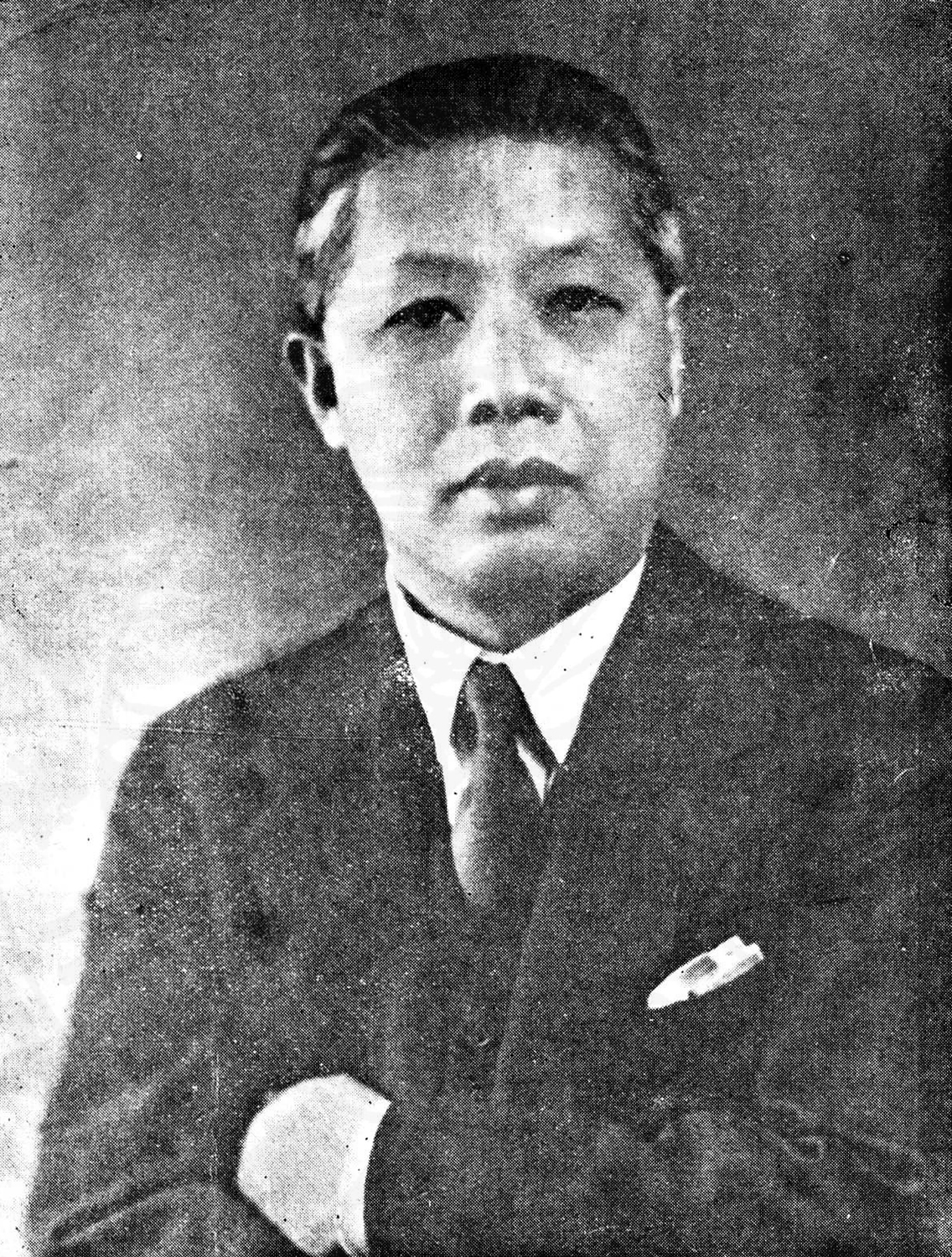

Siamese Minister of Foreign Affairs
- In office: 1 April 1924 – 29 June 1932
- Predecessor: Prince Devawongse Varopakarn
- Successor: Phraya Srivisaravaja (Tianliang Huntrakul)
- Born: 11 August 1883
- Died: 5 February 1943 (aged 59)
- Spouse: Pian Devakula na Ayudhya (Bunnag)
- House: Devakula family (Chakri dynasty)
- Father: Prince Devawongse Varopakarn
- Mother: Mom Lamai Devakula na Ayudhya

His Highness Prince Devawongse Varodaya, formerly known as Traidos Prabandh (11 September 1883 – 5 February 1943) was a former Thai Minister of Foreign Affairs and privy councillor.

== Biography ==
He was born the son of Prince Devawongse Varopakarn and Mom Lamai Devakula na Ayudhya, and was born as HSH Prince Traidos Prabandh Devakula. He served as the Siamese Minister to Washington D.C. between 1912 and 1913, then served as the Ambassador to Denmark between 1914 and 1921 while also concurrently acting as the Ambassador to Germany between 1913 and 1917. On 28 June 1919, he and Prince Jarunsakdi Kridakara were the Siamese representatives to Versailles at the end of the First World War. There, they signed the Treaty of Versailles on behalf of Siam.

During the reign of King Rama VI, he was elevated to His Highness (Phra Ong Chao) Prince Traidos Prabandh on 11 November 1922. When his father the Prince Devawongse Varopakarn died, he took his place as the Minister of Foreign Affairs on 29 June 1923. He was further elevated to the rank of Kromma Muen on 8 November 1929 as the Prince Devawongse Varodaya with a sakdina of 11000 rai, and was made a privy councillor on 21 October 1931

He was removed from his position as Minister of Foreign Affairs following the Siamese Revolution of 1932. On 5 February 1943 he died at 59 years of age. He was granted a royal cremation at Wat Debsirin on 7 April 1943.

== Marriage ==
Prince Devawongse Varodaya married Pian Bunnag. They had 12 children:

- Mom Rajawongse Pantip Devakula, m. Chubhotbongs Paribatra, Prince of Nakhon Sawan
- Mom Rajawongse Tuaythep Devakula
- Mom Rajawongse Devathai Devakula
- Mom Rajawongse Chandararat Devakula
- Mom Rajawongse Theparit Devakula
- Mom Rajawongse Chalermviman Devakula m. Mom Rajawongse Chidhin Kashemsri
- Mom Rajawongse Chitrakup Devakula
- Mom Rajawongse Subhakand Devakula
- Mom Rajawongse Yanthep Devakula
- Mom Rajawongse Ratritos Devakula m. Mom Chao (HSH Prince) Yuthithian Svastivatana
- Mom Rajawongse Chantas Tritos Devakula
- Mom Rajawongse Patana Tritos Devakula
