= Siddhi Savetsila =

Thai air force officer and politician (1919–2015)

Air Chief Marshal Siddhi Savetsila PChW MPCh MWM PMN GCIH
- สิทธิ เศวตศิลา
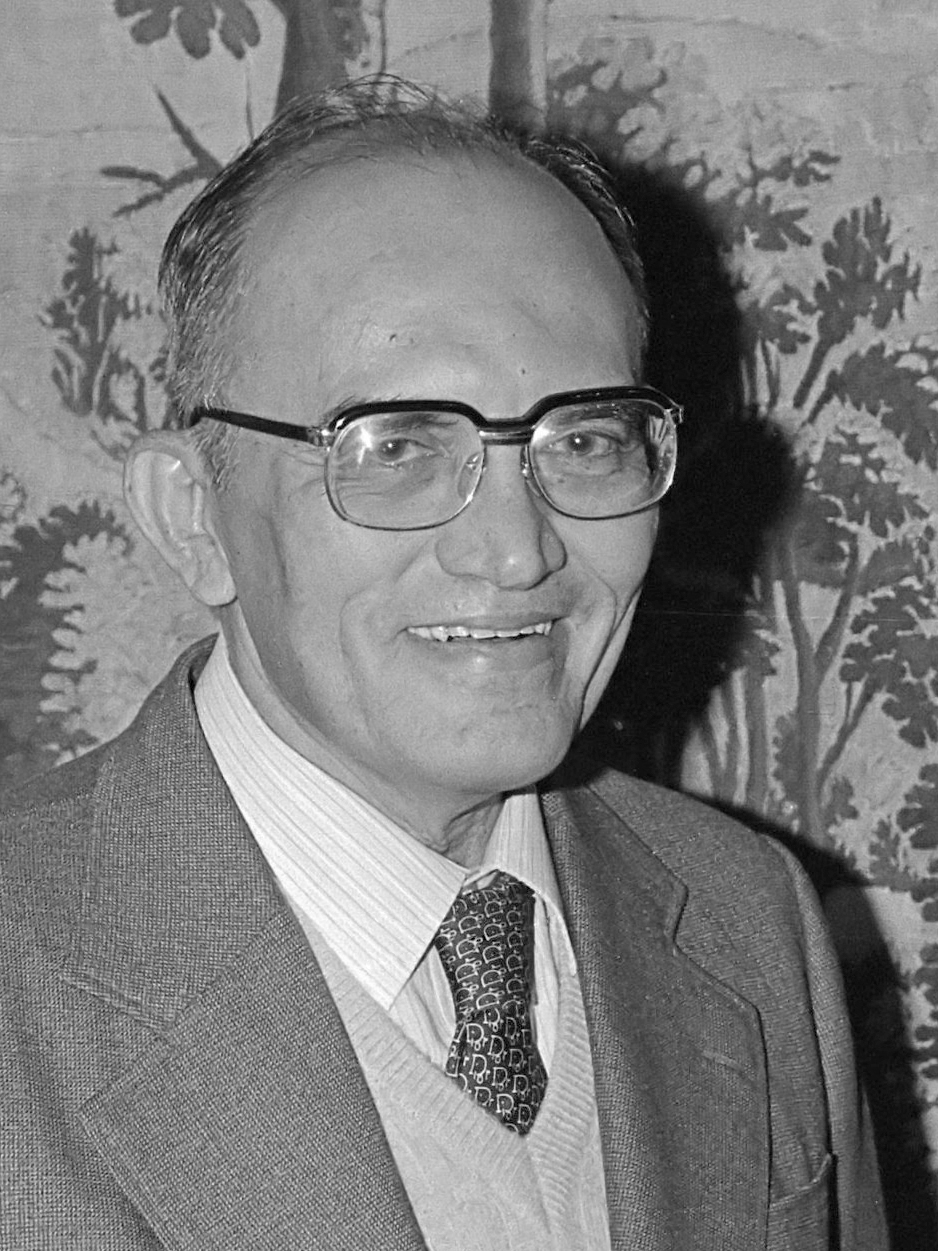
- Siddhi Savetsila at the Catshuis in 1980

Deputy Prime Minister of Thailand
- In office 15 January 1986 – 5 August 1986
- Prime Minister: Prem Tinsulanonda

President of the United Nations Security Council
- In office 1 May 1985 – 31 May 1985 Serving with Birabhongse Kasemsri
- Preceded by: Javier Arias Stella
- Succeeded by: Errol Mahabir; D. H. N. Alleyne

Minister of Foreign Affairs
- In office 11 February 1980 – 26 August 1990
- Prime Minister: Kriangsak Chamanan; Prem Tinsulanonda; Chatichai Choonhavan
- Preceded by: Upadit Pachariyangkun
- Succeeded by: Subin Pinkayan

Minister to the Office of the Prime Minister
- In office 30 January 1980 – 11 February 1980
- Prime Minister: Kriangsak Chamanan
- Preceded by: Boonrueang Buajaroon; Somporn Boonyakup; Thawin Rainanon
- Succeeded by: Peeda Kanasut; Yos Devahastin na Ayudhya; Boonying Nanthapiwat; Pramual Kullamas; Porn Thanapoom

Secretary-General of the National Security Council
- In office 11 December 1974 – 30 January 1980
- Prime Minister: Sanya Dharmasakti; Seni Pramoj; Thanin Kraivichien; Kriangsak Chamanan; Prem Tinsulanonda
- Preceded by: Lek Neawmalee
- Succeeded by: Prasong Soonsiri

Personal details
- Born: 7 January 1919 Bangkok, Thailand
- Died: 5 December 2015 (aged 96) Bangkok, Thailand
- Party: Social Action (1983–1990)
- Other political affiliations: Free Thai Movement
- Education: MIT: S.B., S.M.
- Occupation: Politician; Diplomat; Air Force Officer
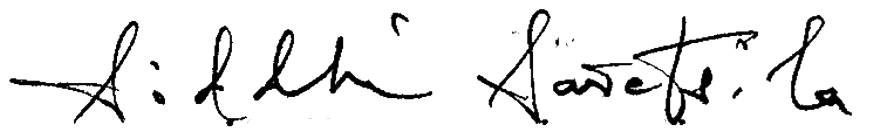
- Signature

Military service
- Allegiance: Thailand
- Branch/service: Royal Thai Air Force
- Rank: Air Chief Marshal
- Battles/wars: Pacific War

Siddhi Savetsila (Thai: สิทธิ เศวตศิลา, RTGS: Sit Sawetsila, Thai pronunciation: [sìt sàʔwèːtsìʔlaː], 7 January 1919 – 5 December 2015) was a Thai air force officer and politician. After finishing his military career with the rank of air chief marshal, he served as the foreign minister of Thailand from 1980 to 1990. In 1991, he became a member of the Privy Council of King Bhumibol Adulyadej. He was the president of the united nations security council in 1985 with Mom Luang Birabhongse Kasemsri.

== Life and education ==
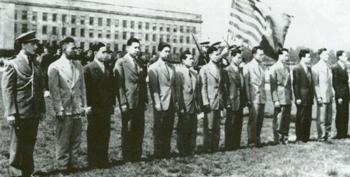
Siddhi and Group of Free Thais who received the Medal of Freedom from the U.S. government on September 2, 1945

Siddhi Savetsila was born in Bangkok. He is a member of the Thai aristocracy. His father was a high-ranking official in the royal government. His paternal grandfather was Henry Alabaster who was the British consul in Siam during the reign of King Rama IV (Mongkut) and then served as an advisor to King Rama V (Chulalongkorn). His mother was an offspring of the influential Bunnag family. He is a direct descendant of Somdet Chao Phraya Borom Maha Prayurawongse.

Siddhi studied metallurgic engineering at the Massachusetts Institute of Technology (MIT), graduating with an S.B. degree in 1943. During the Second World War, he joined the Free Thai Movement (Seri Thai) which resisted against the de facto occupation of Thailand by Japanese forces. He collected data for the US foreign-intelligence agency OSS (predecessor of the CIA) and was temporarily detained by the Japanese. Two of Siddhis sisters married US intelligence operatives, one was the wife of former OSS agent Willis Bird and one of CIA officer William Lair. After the end of the war, he returned to the MIT and received his S.M. degree in 1947.

Siddhi holds honorary doctorate degrees from the University of the Philippines, the National University of Singapore and five universities in Thailand.

== Air Force career ==
He then served in the Royal Thai Air Force and rose up to the rank of air chief marshal (phon akat ek).

== Security career ==
From 1975 to 1980 he served as Secretary-General of the National Security Council. In this position he assisted Prime Minister Kriangsak Chomanan at the time of the Vietnamese invasion of Cambodia during 1978 to 1979.

== Political career ==
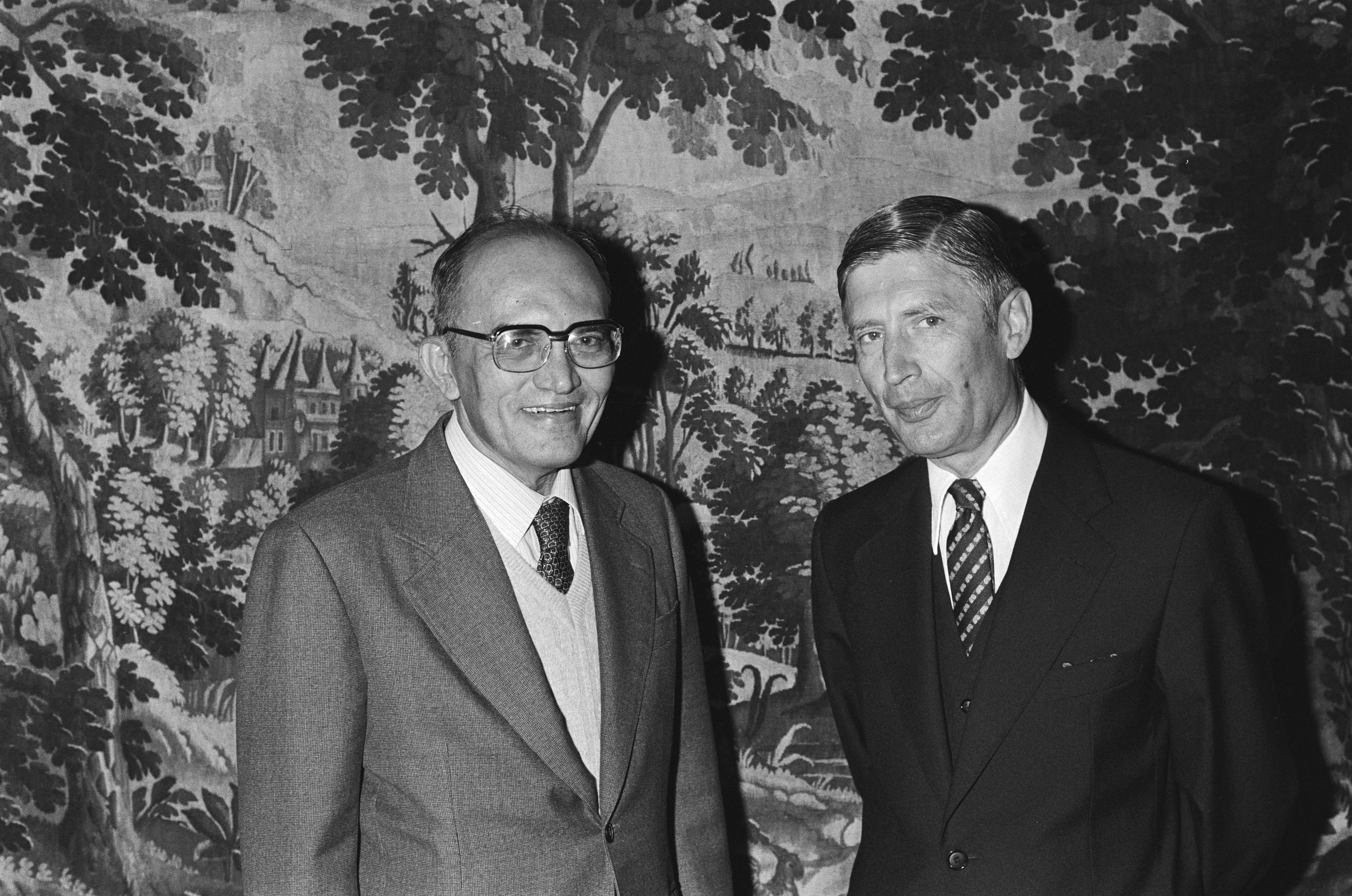
Prime Minister Dries van Agt with Siddhi Savetsila in 1980

In 1980, Kriangsak appointed him minister of foreign affairs. He kept this position when Prem Tinsulanonda took over the premiership a few months later. As Thailand's representative in the United Nations (UN) and ASEAN, Siddhi advocated a tough line towards Vietnam which was occupying Cambodia after 1979. In 1983, Siddhi was elected member of parliament and in 1985 he took over the leadership of the Social Action Party (SAP) following the retirement of Kukrit Pramoj. The party did well in the 1986 election and Siddhi additionally became deputy prime minister for a short time.

In August 1990, the new Prime Minister Chatichai Choonhavan dismissed Siddhi as he sought a more pragmatic relationship with the communist-ruled countries of Southeast Asia. Siddhi's SAP was in great difficulties during the late 1980s and, in September 1990, Siddhi gave up his leadership. One month later, he completely retired from the parliament and the party, stating that he was tired of politics. In 1991, King Bhumibol appointed him to his privy council.

== Died ==
He died on 5 December 2015 at the age of 96.

== Honour ==
He was decorated with the Order of Chula Chom Klao (first class), the Order of the White Elephant (special class) and the Order of the Crown of Thailand (special class), as well as foreign decorations from 14 countries.

On 8 May 2000, he was among the five Free Thai veterans who were awarded the Agency Seal Medallion by CIA director George Tenet.

=== Foreign Honours ===
- Knight Grand Cross of the Order of Chula Chom Klao
- Knight Grand Cross of the Order of the White Elephant
- Knight Grand Cross of the Order of the Crown of Thailand
- Freemen Safeguarding Medal, First Class
- Chakra Mala Medal
- King Rama IX Royal Cypher Medal, 3rd class

=== Foreign honour ===
- United States :
  - Medal of Freedom
- South Korea :
  - Order of Diplomatic Service Merit, Gwanghwa Medal
- Chile :
  - Grand Cross of the Order of Merit
- Argentina :
  - Grand Cross of the Order of the Liberator San Martin
- Austria :
  - Grand Decoration of Honour in Gold with Sash of the Decoration of Honour for Services to the Republic of Austria
- Malaysia :
  - Honorary Commander of the Order of the Defender of the Realm (P.M.N.) (1983)
- Portugal:
  - Grand Cross of the Order of Prince Henry (G.C.I.H.)
