= Arsa Sarasin =

Thai diplomat and businessman (born 1937)

- อาสา สารสิน
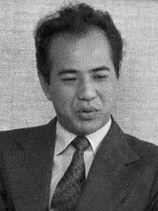
- Arsa in 1977

His Majesty's Principal Private Secretary
- In office 1 August 1999 – 30 September 2012
- Monarch: Bhumibol Adulyadej
- Preceded by: Peerapong Kasemsri
- Succeeded by: Krit Kanjanakunchon

Minister of Foreign Affairs
- In office 10 June 1992 – 22 September 1992
- Prime Minister: Anand Panyarachun
- Preceded by: Pongpol Adireksarn
- Succeeded by: Prasong Soonsiri
- In office 6 March 1991 – 22 March 1992
- Prime Minister: Anand Panyarachun
- Preceded by: Arthit Ourairat
- Succeeded by: Pongpol Adireksarn

Personal details
- Born: 26 May 1937 (age 89) Phra Nakhon, Siam
- Spouse: Sujitkhun Kitiyakara
- Children: 3

Arsa Sarasin (Thai: อาสา สารสิน; born 26 May 1937) is a Thai diplomat and businessman who served as Principal Private Secretary to Bhumibol Adulyadej until he retired in 2012.

== Early life and education ==
Arsa Sarasin was the son of former Prime Minister of Thailand Pote Sarasin and his wife, Thanpuying Siri Sarasin. He was one of three brothers, including Pao Sarasin and Pong Sarasin. Arsa Sarasin graduated from Bangkok Christian College, a private boys' school in Bangkok and Dawlish Primary School in London. He then moved to the United States, where he study High school at Wilbraham & Monson Academy and received a bachelor's degree from Boston University.

== Careers ==
From 1977 to 1979, he was firstly appointed as Thailand's ambassador to Belgium. Then, around two to three years later from 1982 to 1985, he was Permanent Secretary of the Ministry of Foreign Affairs and from 1985 to 1988 he was appointed ambassador to the United States.

From 1999 to 2012, he was Principal Private Secretary to King Bhumibol Adulyadej, responsible for aiding the monarch in the exercise of his official duties and relations with the government. He has sat on the boards of the family-owned Thai Pure Drinks Company, as well as the Siam Cement Group, Charoen Pokphand Foods, Dusit International, and Bangkok Dusit Medical Services.

== Honours ==
=== National honours ===
- Knight Grand Cordon (Special Class) of the Most Exalted Order of the White Elephant (1984)
- Knight Grand Cordon (Special Class) of the Most Noble Order of the Crown of Thailand (1982)
- Knight Grand Cordon (Second Class, upper grade) of the Most Illustrious Order of Chula Chom Klao (1994)
- Chakrabarti Mala Medal (1985)
- First Class of the Boy Scout Citation Medal of Vajira (2003)

=== Foreign honours ===
- Belgium:
  - Grand Cross of the Order of the Crown
- Brunei:
  - First Class of the Order of Paduka Seri Laila Jasa (2002)
- Cambodia:
  - Grand Cross (Maha Sirivudha) of the Royal Order of Sahametrei
- Denmark:
  - Grand Cross of the Order of the Dannebrog (2001)
- Germany:
  - Grand Cross 1st Class of the Order of Merit of the Federal Republic of Germany (1984)
- Japan:
  - Grand Cordon of the Order of the Rising Sun (1992)
  - Fourth Class of the Order of the Sacred Treasure (1966)
- Nepal:
  - Member First Class of the Order of Gorkha Dakshina Bahu
- Netherlands:
  - Knight Grand Cross of the Order of Orange-Nassau (2004)
- Sweden:
  - Commander Grand Cross of the Order of the Polar Star (2003)

== See also ==
- Sarasin family
