= Mary Ann Criddle =

English painter

Mary Anne Criddle
- Born: Mary Anne Alabaster c. 1805; Holywell Mount, Shoreditch, East London, England
- Died: 1880 (aged 74–75); Addlestone near Chertsey, Surrey, England
- Occupation: painter

Mary Anne Criddle, (née Alabaster, c. 1805–1880) was an English oil and water colour painter. She was a member of the Society of Painters in Water Colours and exhibited at the Royal Academy of Arts.

== Biography ==
Criddle was born in 1805 at Chapel House, Holywell Mount in Shoreditch, East London. Her father and mother were straw hat and bonnet makers. She attended school in Colchester in Essex, until her father died in 1820.

Criddle became an oil painter studying under society portrait painter John Hayter from 1824.

In 1836, she married Harry C. Criddle, who was also from a family of hatters. She continued to work after her marriage, though after her brother James Alabaster died in 1840 she adopted his three sons. In 1844 her own son Percy Criddle was born.

Criddle began watercolour painting in 1846 after her doctor told her that oil painting was bad for her health. She became successful with shows held at the Royal Academy of Arts, as well as being elected an associate member of the Society of Painters in Water Colours, also known as the Old Watercolour Society, in 1849. She was the ninth woman to be admitted to the society since it had been established in 1804. Criddle is also known for sculpture.

From 1852 to 1854, Criddle suffered partial blindness and stopped working, but was still working when her biography was written by the author and artist Ellen Creathorne Clayton in 1876.

Criddle was widowed in 1857 and moved to near Addlestone near Chertsey, Surrey, from where she continued to exhibit. She died there in 1880.
