= Sarasin family =

Thai Chinese business family

Sarasin สารสิน
- Parent family: Huang family
- Current region: Bangkok, Thailand
- Origin: Bangkok, Thailand
- Founded: 1917
- Founder: Thian Hee Sarasin

The Sarasin family (Thai: สารสิน) is a wealthy assimilated Thai Chinese business and political dynasty that rose to prominence during the 19th century. The family monopolised a number of bureaucratic offices and established a number of well-known businesses, one of which – the Thai Pure Drinks Co. Ltd – is still operating and co-owned by the family. The entrenched status of the Sarasin clan has been studied by a number of Thai historians and sociologists as an example of the successful integration of Chinese immigrants in Thailand throughout the 19th and 20th centuries, given their descendants' subsequent influence on Thailand's economy and politics.

== Notable family members ==
Members of the Sarasin family include former Prime Minister of Thailand and SEATO secretary-general Pote Sarasin; Thian Hee (aristocratic title: Phraya Sarasinswamiphakdi); former deputy prime minister and businessman Pong Sarasin; former police chief general and interior minister Pao Sarasin; and former foreign minister and royal secretary Arsa Sarasin. Patee Sarasin, a son of Arsa Sarasin, was the longtime CEO of Nok Air. The Sarasin family, along with the Lamsam and the Wanglee families, have been the subject of a number of academic studies of Thai-Chinese elites, their control of business corporations, and the consolidation of control through political means. The family's political legacy has often been compared to the Kennedy family in the United States.

== Family history ==
The Sarasin family's passage into the political and economic arena was largely due to the entrepreneurialism of Thian Hee, the first member of the family to be elevated to noble status and bestowed with a Thai surname. Although already a wealthy rice trader, Thian Hee contributed to the family's economic status by investing in a number of industries, establishing the family's reputation in Bangkok. He was the first Thai doctor to graduate from Columbia University in New York City and the first medical doctor in the Royal Thai Army, participating in various campaigns during the Thai-Laotian wars of 1865–1890. Thien Hee was awarded for his medical expertise as well as his loyalty, and was thus elevated to noble rank. Having retired from the army he pursued his business interests, amassing a considerable wealth and establishing several major Thai corporations, including Siam Cement, of which his grandchildren and great-grandchildren sit on the board. His son, Pote, continued and strengthened the family's political and business legacy by cultivating ties with the royal family and other bureaucratic elites. Pote became an influential statesman, serving as Prime Minister in 1957 of the government installed after a coup led by Field Marshal Sarit Thanarat. Pote played a major role in maintaining diplomatic relations between the Thai military government and the United States during the 1950s.

Pote became the family patriarch and expanded his family's business holdings during Thailand's rapid economic boom, part of the rise of the "Tiger Cub Economies" of south-east Asia. The family is currently the controlling shareholder of a number of large corporations in Thailand, including Thai Pure Drinks Co. Ltd, the Home Product Centre Public Co. Ltd, Honda Automobile (Thailand) Co. Ltd, and the Sarasin Co. Ltd. Due to the family's prominence in the upper echelons of society, the name "Sarasin" became synonymous with wealth and respectability during the 19th century. A number of national landmarks reflect the family's status, such as the Sarasin Road and Sarasin Building in Bangkok, and Sarasin Bridge, connecting Phuket to mainland Thailand.
