= Chaloner Alabaster =

English administrator in China

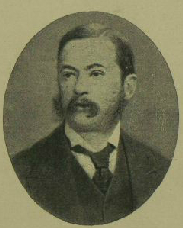
Alabaster c.1898

Sir Chaloner Grenville Alabaster KCMG (1838–1898) was an English administrator in China.

== Early life ==
He was born in Bournemouth and was the son of Mr. J.C. Alabaster. He attended King's College London and matriculated at London University in 1852.

== Career in China ==
In 1855, he went to China as a student interpreter, remaining there during the Second Opium War and the Taiping Rebellion.

Between 1869 and 1873, he was British Vice-Consul in Shanghai and subsequently became Consul General at Hankow, Wuhan from 1880 to 1886, then at Canton from 1886 until 1891. He retired in 1892 and was made knight commander in the Order of St Michael and St George.

== Marriage and family ==
In 1875, Chaloner married Laura, daughter of Dr. D. J. MacGowan of New York City. He was also a freemason. His son, who was named Chaloner Grenville Alabaster but went by the name Grenville, became Attorney General in Hong Kong from 1930 to 1945.

Chaloner Alabaster's elder brother, Henry Alabaster, also entered the consular service, serving as acting consul in Siam before leaving his position to act as an advisor to King Chulalongkorn.

== Death ==
Alabaster died on 28 June 1898 at Boscombe, Bournemouth, England. He was buried in East Cemetery, Bournemouth.

Papers relating to his official work in China are held at the SOAS Archives.
