= Ministry of Foreign Affairs (Thailand) =

Government ministry of Thailand

- กระทรวงการต่างประเทศ
- The Crystal Lotus seal of the ministry

- The Crystal Lotus flag of the ministry

Ministry overview
- Formed: 14 April 1840; 186 years ago
- Jurisdiction: Government of Thailand
- Headquarters: 443 Sri Ayutthaya Rd, Phaya Thai, Ratchathewi, Bangkok 10400
- Annual budget: 9.2 billion baht (FY2019)
- Minister responsible: Sihasak Phuangketkeow, Minister of Foreign Affairs
- Ministry executive: Eksiri Pintaruchi, Permanent Secretary
- Website: www.mfa.go.th

The Ministry of Foreign Affairs of the Kingdom of Thailand (Abrv: MFA; Thai: กระทรวงการต่างประเทศ, RTGS: Krasuang Kan Tang Prathet) is the principal governmental department in charge of foreign relations for Thailand. The ministry is headed by the Minister of Foreign Affairs, who is also a member of the Cabinet of Thailand. The Minister of Foreign Affairs is appointed by the Prime minister. The ministry is charged with formulating and executing foreign policies for the Kingdom of Thailand and also manages and maintains Thai diplomatic missions around the world.

== History ==
Prior to the creation of the ministry, much of the country's foreign relations were handled by the absolute monarchs of the day. During the Kingdom of Ayutthaya foreign relations were handled by the "Krom Phra Khlang" (Thai: กรมพระคลัง) (or the Treasury Department). The head of the department was known as "Phra Khlang" (Thai: พระคลัง) and occasionally referred to as "Berguelang" or "Barcelon" by foreign authors. A notable Phra Khlang Kosathibodi during the reign of King Narai was Kosa Lek, who was the elder brother of the famous 17th-century Siamese ambassador to France Kosa Pan. Kosa Pan also became a Phra Khlang Kosathibodi upon the reign of Petracha. Soon after, a sub-department called "Kromma Tha" (Thai: กรมท่า, "Port Department") was created to deal with foreigners.

During the Bangkok Period most of these features were retained. For instance, the Chau Phaya-Phraklang in his capacity as Minister of State on behalf of Jessadabodindra negotiated the Siamese–American Treaty of Amity and Commerce of 1833 with Edmund Roberts in his capacity as Minister of the United States on behalf of President Andrew Jackson.

Ambasador Flag of Thailand proposed by King Vajiravudh in 1917

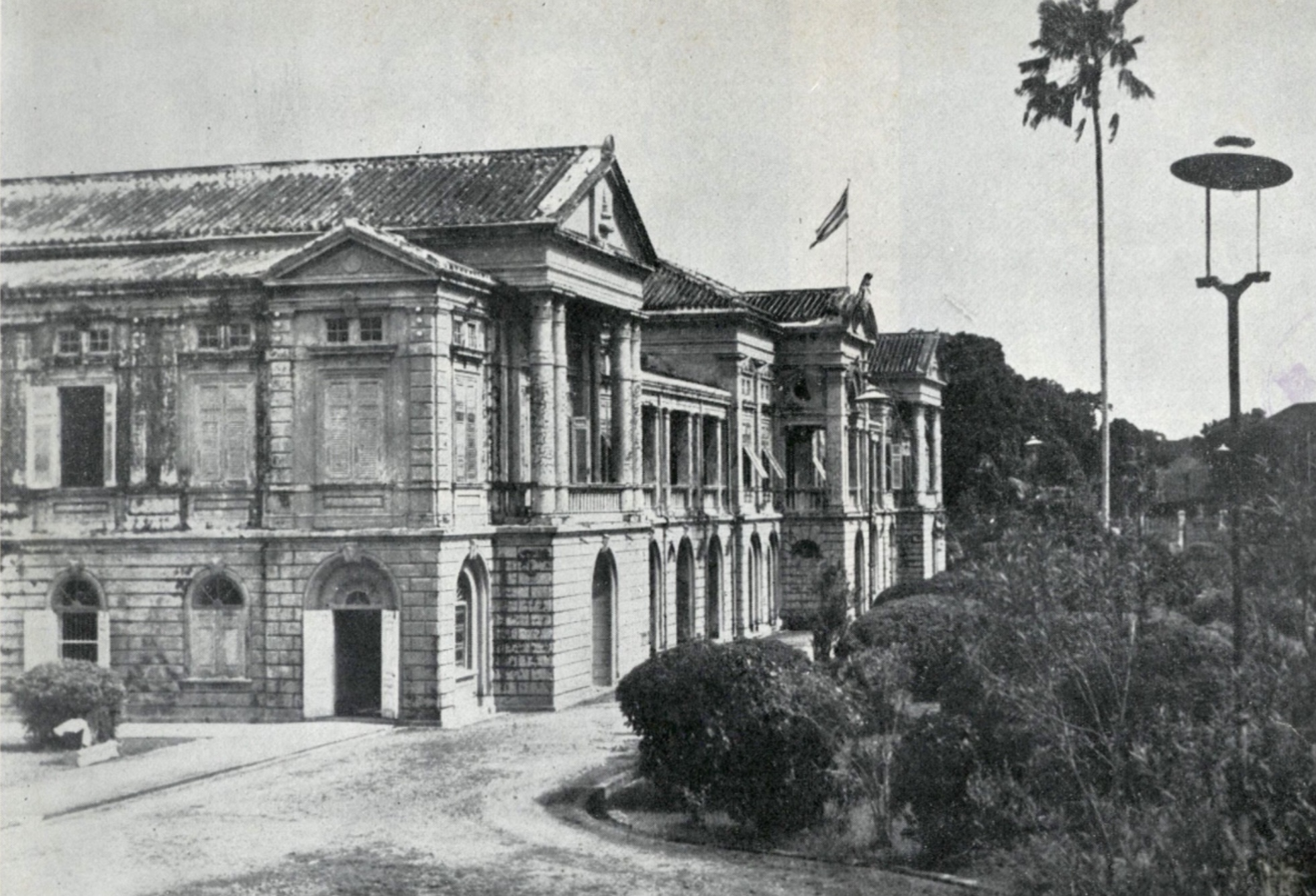
The ministry during its headquarter at the Saranrom Palace in 1954

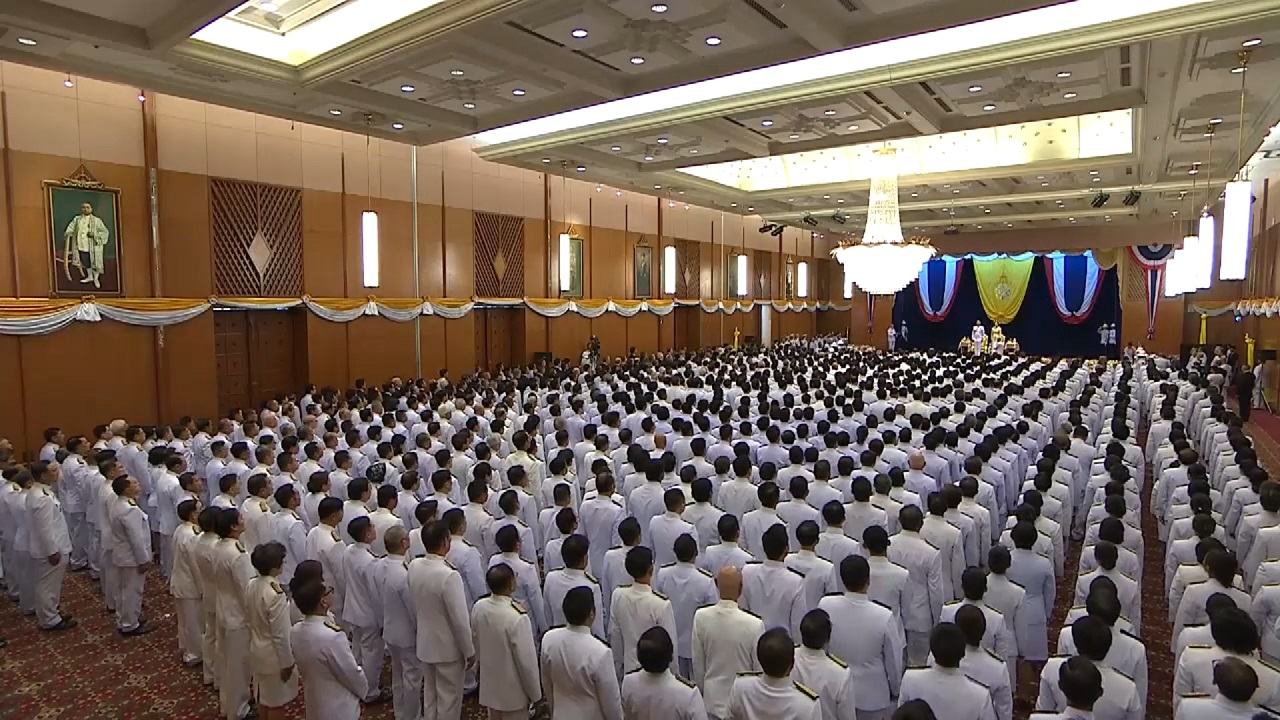
Vithes Samosorn Hall inside Ministry of Foreign Affairs building at Si Ayutthaya Rd.

In 1840, King Mongkut, the next king, founded the Ministry of Foreign Affairs of the Kingdom of Siam, which was administered directly by the king. The responsibilities and roles of the old "Krom" were shifted to this ministry. Chao Phraya Bhanuwong became the first Foreign Minister of Siam in 1871, appointed by King Chulalongkorn. In 1881 Prince Devavongse Varoprakarn was appointed to replace him. Known today as the "father of Thai diplomacy" he reorganized and modernized the ministry to meet 19th century standards. The ministry was then permanently established at Saranrom Palace, east of the Grand Palace. The ministry was divided into seven divisions:

- Senabodi Division (Ministerial Division)
- Under-Secretary Division
- Translation Division
- Reception Division
- Accounts Division
- Filing Division
- Diplomatic Division
- Consular Division

=== Foreign affairs advisers ===
From 1892 to 1924, the Siamese government retained the professional legal services of lawyers skilled in international law.

- Gustave Rolin-Jaequemyns, an international legal scholar, served as Adviser-General from 1892 to 1902.
- Edward Strobel, a Harvard Law School Bemis Professor of International Law, served as American Adviser-General from 1906 until his death in 1908. He was followed by Harvard Law Professors Jens Westengard, Francis B. Sayre and Eldon James.

=== Reorganization ===
After the Revolution of 1932, the ministry came under civilian control and the minister was made a member of the constitutional government of Siam. The first minister under this new system was Phraya Srivisanvaja.

In 1992, the ministry office was moved to Si Ayutthaya Road, Thung Phaya Thai Subdistrict, Ratchathewi District, Bangkok in the area that used to be the headquarter of Southeast Asia Treaty Organization (SEATO), the Ministry also has an office building of the Department of Consular Affairs at Chaeng Watthana Road.

== Operations ==
The MFA budget for FY2019 is 9,197.3 million baht.

=== Administration ===
- Office of the Minister
- Office of the Permanent Secretary

=== Functional departments ===
- Department of Consular Affairs
- Department of Protocol
- Thailand International Cooperation Agency (TICA)
- Department of International Economic Affairs
- Department of Treaties and Legal Affairs
- Department of Information
- Department of International Organizations

=== Regional departments ===
- Department of European Affairs
- Department of American and South Pacific Affairs
- Department of ASEAN Affairs (for international undertakings under the framework of ASEAN; while bilateral relations between Thailand and each ASEAN member is under the East Asian Affairs Department)
- Department of East Asian Affairs
- Department of South Asian, Middle East and African Affairs

== List of ministers ==
This is a list of ministers of foreign affairs of Thailand:

- 1875–1885: Chao Phraya Panuwongse Maha Kosathibodi
- 1885–1923: Prince Devawongse Varoprakar
- 1924–1932: Prince Traidos Prabandh
- 1932–1933: Phraya Srivisaravaja
- 1933–1934: Phraya Abhibanrajamaitri
- 1934–1935: Phraya Phaholphonphayuhasena
- 1935–1936: Phraya Srisena
- 1936–1938: Pridi Banomyong
- 1938–1939: Chao Phya Sridharmadhibes
- 1939–1941: Plaek Phibunsongkhram
- 1941: Direk Jayanama
- 1941–1942: Plaek Phibunsongkhram
- 1942–1943: Luang Wichitwathakan
- 1943–1944: Direk Jayanama
- 1944–1945: Srisena Sampatisiri
- 1945–1946: Seni Pramoj
- 1946–1947: Direk Jayanama
- 1947: Thawan Thamrongnawasawat
- 1947: Arthakitti Banomyong
- 1947–1948: Phraya Srivisaravaja
- 1948–1949: Priditheppong Devakul
- 1949: Plaek Phibunsongkhram
- 1949–1950: Pote Sarasin
- 1950–1952: Warakan Bancha
- 1952–1958: Prince Wan Waithayakon
- 1959–1971: Thanat Khoman
- 1971–1973: Thanom Kittikachorn
- 1973–1975: Charunphan Isarangkun Na Ayuthaya
- 1975: Bhichai Rattakul
- 1975–1976: Chatichai Choonhavan
- 1976: Bhichai Rattakul
- 1976–1980: Upadit Pachariyangkun
- 1980–1990: Siddhi Savetsila
- 1990: Subin Pinkayan
- 1990–1991: Arthit Ourairat
- 1991–1992: Arsa Sarasin
- 1992: Pongpol Adireksarn
- 1992: Arsa Sarasin
- 1992–1994: Prasong Soonsiri
- 1994–1995: Thaksin Shinawatra
- 1995: Krasae Chanawongse
- 1995–1996: Kasem S. Kasemsri
- 1996: Amnuay Viravan
- 1996–1997: Prachuab Chaiyasan
- 1997–2001: Surin Pitsuwan
- 2001–2005: Surakiart Sathirathai
- 2005–2006: Kantathi Suphamongkhon
- 2006–2008: Nitya Pibulsonggram
- 2008: Noppadon Pattama
- 2008: Tej Bunnag
- 2008: Saroj Chavanaviraj
- 2008: Sompong Amornwiwat
- 2008–2011: Kasit Piromya
- 2011–2014: Surapong Tovichakchaikul
- 2014–2015: Thanasak Patimaprakorn
- 2015–2023: Don Pramudwinai
- 2023–2024: Parnpree Bahiddha-nukara
- 2024–2025: Maris Sangiampongsa
- 2025–present: Sihasak Phuangketkeow

== See also ==
- Foreign relations of Thailand
  - Diplomatic missions of Thailand
- Cabinet of Thailand
- List of Government Ministers of Thailand
- Government of Thailand
