= Sunanda Kumariratana =

Queen of Siam from 1877 to 1880

Sunanda Kumariratana; สุนันทากุมารีรัตน์
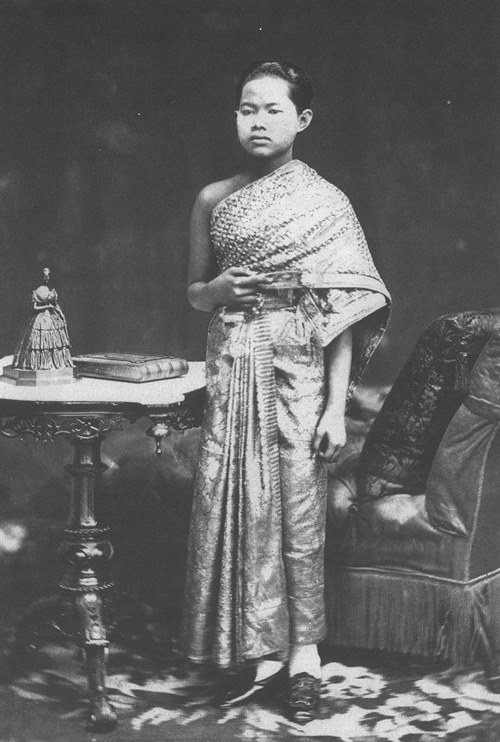
- Sunanda Kumariratana in 1877

Queen consort of Siam
- Tenure: 1877 – 31 May 1880
- Born: 10 November 1860; Bangkok, Siam
- Died: 31 May 1880 (aged 19); Pak Kret, Siam
- Spouse: Chulalongkorn (Rama V)
- Issue: Kannabhorn Bejaratana
Names
- Phra Chao Luk Thoe Phra Ong Chao Sunanda Kumariratana
Posthumous name
- Somdet Phra Nang Chao Sunanda Kumariratana Phra Boromma Rajadevi
- Dynasty: Chakri
- Father: Mongkut (Rama IV)
- Mother: Piam Sucharitakul

Royal wives of Chulalongkorn

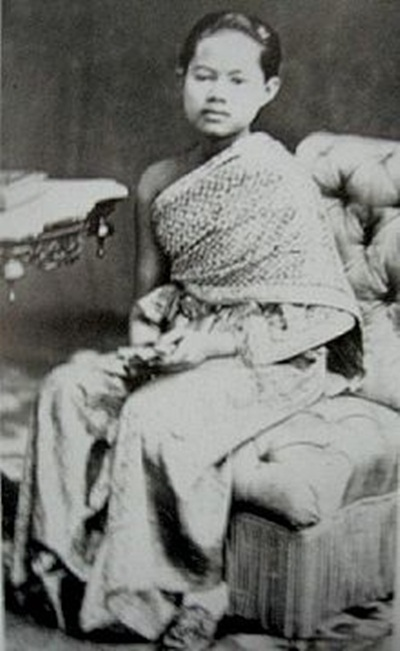
Sunanda Kumariratana

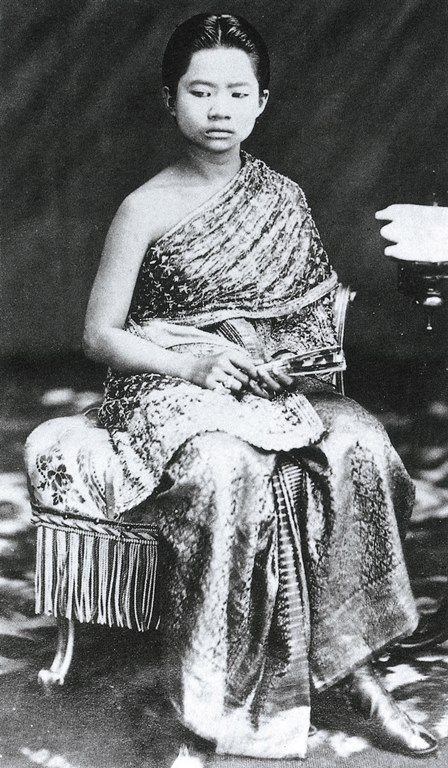
Sukhumala Marasri

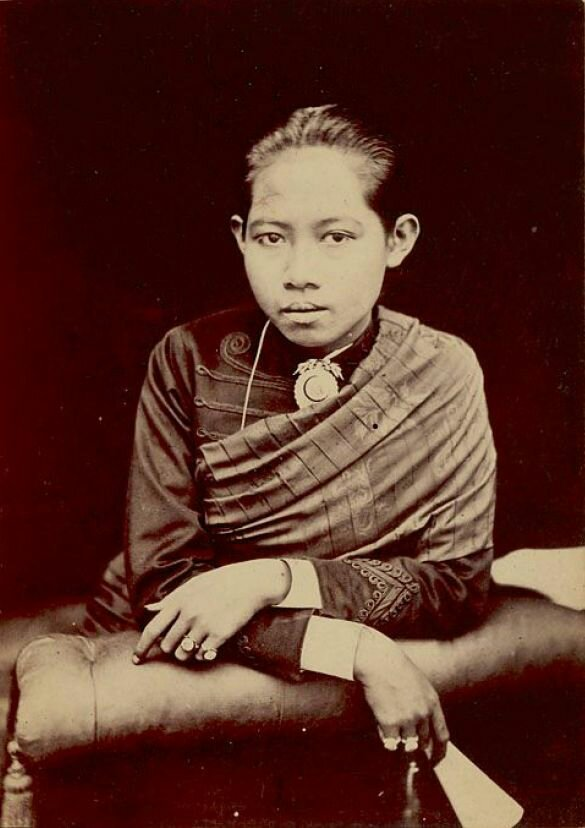
Savang Vadhana

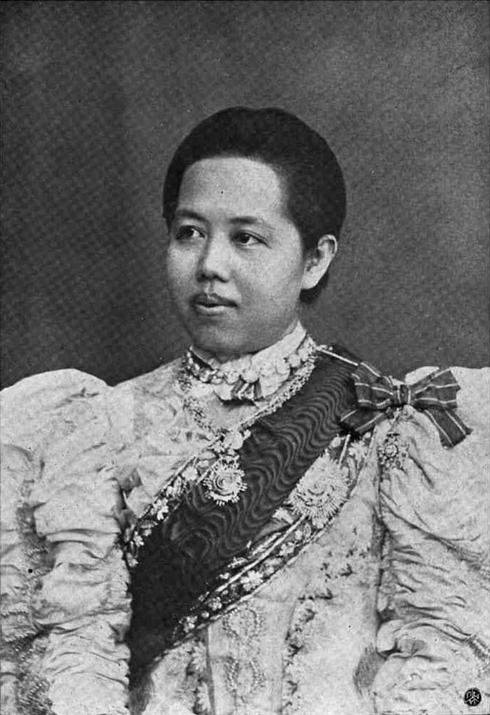
Saovabha Phongsri

Sunanda Kumariratana (Thai: สุนันทากุมารีรัตน์, RTGS: Sunantha Kumarirat, Sunandākumārīratana; 10 November 1860 – 31 May 1880) was a queen consort of Siam. She was one of the four royal wives of King Chulalongkorn.

== Background ==
She was a daughter and fiftieth child of Siamese King Mongkut (Rama IV) and Princess Consort Piam. She was the half-sister and first wife of King Chulalongkorn (Rama V) of Siam (now Thailand). The king's other two wives were her younger sisters, Their Majesty Queen Savang Vadhana and Queen Saovabha Phongsri.

The queen and her daughter Kannabhorn Bejaratana drowned when the steam boat Sorawan collided with their royal boat towed by the steam yacht Pan Marut on the way to the Bang Pa-In Royal Palace (Summer Palace).

There is an often repeated myth that the many witnesses to the accident did not dare to touch the queen, a capital offense—not even to save her life. However, this was not the case; the King's diary records that boatmen dived into the water, pulled the queen and her daughter from the entangling curtains, and carried them to another boat, where attendants worked in vain to resuscitate them. No one else died in the accident.

== Funeral ==
The grief-stricken Chulalongkorn demanded a resplendent funeral for them. Preparations for the funeral took 10 months and the funeral ceremony did not begin until 10 March 1881. The bodies of the queen and princess were dried with injections of quicksilver and stored in golden urns while precious woods were collected for the construction of a funeral pyre; royal facilities where the king and entourage resided during the cremation ceremonies were also constructed in a location referred to as Pra Mane. The funeral pyre was reported to be 280 feet (85 m) tall and was built over an altar where the urns were placed for cremation.

The proceedings and celebrations were opulent, attended by many, and documented in great detail. Chulalongkorn lit the funeral pyre around 6:00 p.m. on 15 March to the sound of horns, and the pyre burned throughout the night. Celebrations ended on 20 March with a procession to the Grand Palace.
