= Östra Bispgården =

- Location within Jämtland Location within Sweden
- Coordinates: 63°00′N 16°40′E
- Country: Sweden
- Province: Jämtland
- County: Jämtland County
- Municipality: Ragunda Municipality

Area
  - Total: 1.48 km^{2} (0.57 sq mi)

Population (31 December 2010)
  - Total: 279
  - Density: 189/km^{2} (490/sq mi)
- Time zone: UTC+1 (CET)
  - Summer (DST): UTC+2 (CEST)

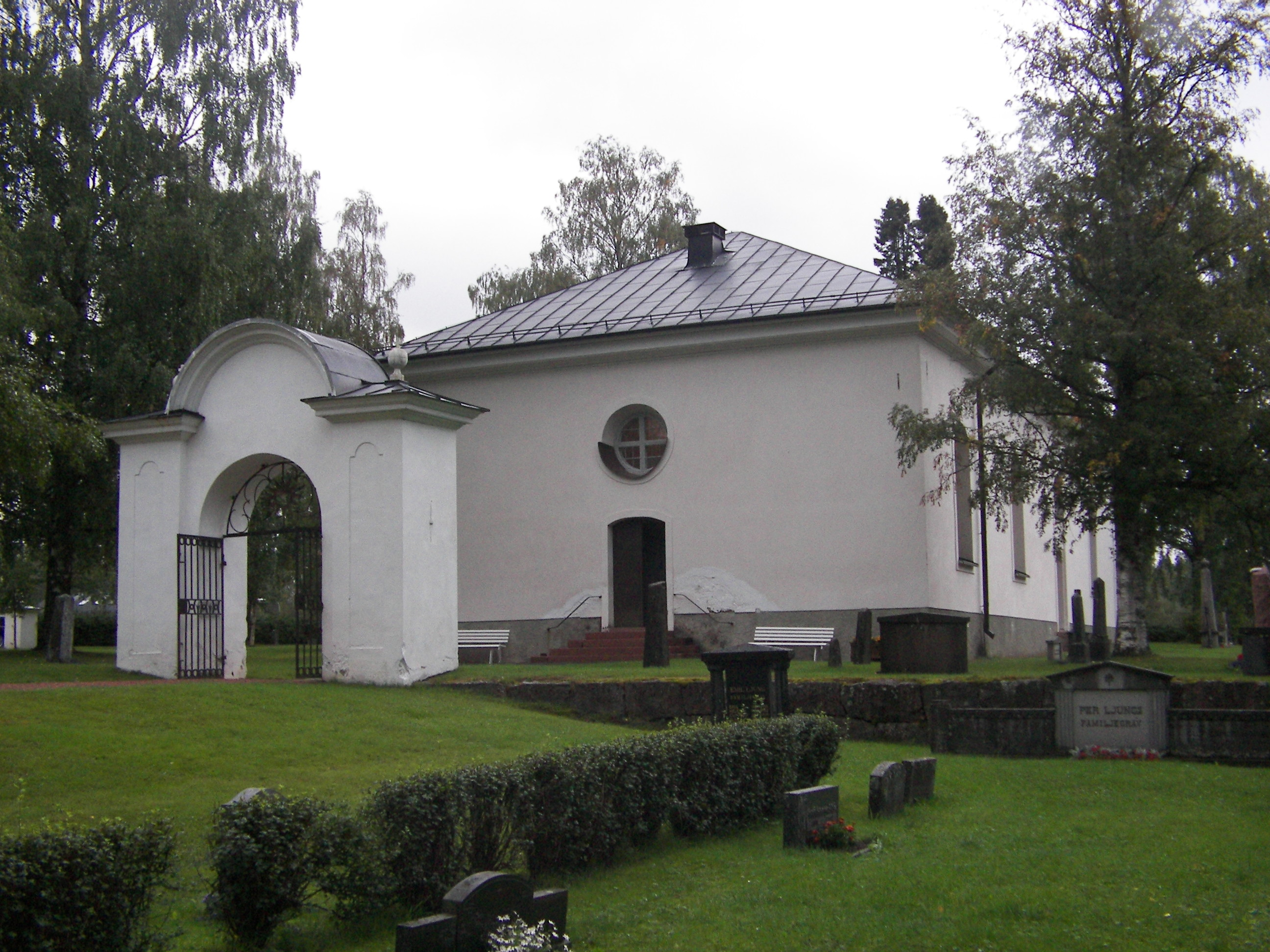
Fors church, Bispgården, Sweden

Östra Bispgården is a locality situated in Ragunda Municipality, Jämtland County, Sweden with 279 inhabitants in 2010.

== History ==
The earliest recorded mention of the area dates back to 1472, when it was referred to as "Biskopsgard," meaning "Bishop's Farm." This name indicates the area's historical connection to the Archbishopric of Uppsala, which administered the region during the Middle Ages. The settlement became the center of the Fors parish, with the first church established in the 16th century. In 1568, records from Fors parish indicate the existence of eight farms in the area, including one in Biskopsgården. These records highlight the agricultural foundation of the community during that period.

The construction of the railway in 1885 also marked a significant turning point for Bispgården. The establishment of the railway station facilitated transport and trade, contributing to the development of the area.

Another point of interest is the King Chulalongkorn Memorial Building, located in the nearby village of Utanede. This Thai-style pavilion was erected in 1998 to commemorate the visit of King Chulalongkorn of Siam (now Thailand) to the area in 1897.
