= Margit Hall =

Swedish architect

Margit Hall on her 1923 student card

Margit Dagmar Hall (19 July 1901, St Petersburg — 30 May 1937, Bispgården) was a Swedish architect. She was the first woman to take the architect examination at Chalmers Technical Institute in Gothenburg and the first woman in Sweden to graduate in architecture as an ordinary student.

== Biography ==
The daughter of the engineer Harald Hall and Maria Rodd, Hall grew up in a family of four children in St Petersburg, Russia. She later moved to Gothenburg where she matriculated from the Gymnasium för flickor (girls high school) in 1919. After an internship in Hans Hedlund's studio, she studied architecture at Chalmers, taking the architecture examination in 1922. She went on to study history of art under Axel Romdahl until 1925. While at Chalmers, she provided support for female students, becoming secretary for Göteborgs Kvinnliga Studentförenging (Gothenburg's Women Student's Association). From 1924 to 1927, she worked as an architect at Gothenburg's Engineering Office. She also made study trips to Germany, Lithuania and Estonia. Hall designed numerous private homes as well as the Swedish pavilion for the International Trade Industry Exhibition in Brasa near Riga in Latvia.

In 1928, she married the furniture designer Per Hilding Eklund (1895–1936) and moved to Bispgården in Ragunda Municipality. She worked in the family's furniture manufacturing business, Firma P.A. Eklund Snickerfabrik, where she and her husband designed furniture in the Rococo style. Their creations included chairs, sofas, stools, desks and bookshelves.

Margit Hall died of cancer when she was only 35 on 30 May 1937 in Bispgården.
