= Yuri Gagarin (band) =

Swedish rock band

- Origin: Gothenburg, Sweden
- Genres: Acid rock; Doom metal; Instrumental rock; Progressive rock; Psychedelic rock; Space rock; Stoner rock
- Years active: 2012–present
- Labels: Kommun 2; Sulatron; Urtod Void; Ultraljud; Levande Begravd; Sound Effect
- Members: Christian "Crille" Lindberg; Jon Eriksson; Stefan "Steffo" Johansson; Robin Klockerman; Leif Göransson
- Website: yurigagarinswe.bandcamp.com

Yuri Gagarin is a rock band from Gothenburg, Sweden. Formed in 2012, the band consists of lead guitarist Christian "Crille" Lindberg, rhythm guitarist Jon Eriksson, bass guitarist Leif Göransson, synthesizer player Robin Klockerman, and drummer Stefan "Steffo" Johansson.

== History ==
Yuri Gagarin were formed in Gothenburg, Sweden at the beginning of 2012. The band began as a three-piece comprising lead guitarist Christian "Crille" Lindberg from Helsingborg, drummer Stefan "Steffo" Johansson from Kungälv, and bass guitarist Leif Göransson from Stugun. Lindberg and Johansson had met in 2001, previously forming a doom band called Stone Serpent. Lindberg specifically decided that he wanted to form a space rock band and approached Johansson and Göransson to be part of it. The band were named after Yuri Gagarin, the Russian Soviet pilot and cosmonaut who became the first human in space in 1961. Other names considered for the band were Laika (after the first animal to enter Earth's orbit) and Vostok-1 (the spaceflight crewed by Gagarin).

Subsequently, in order to expand the band's sound, synthesizer player Robin Klockerman from Örebro was added, followed by rhythm guitarist Jon Eriksson from Hagfors several months later.

Their first, self-titled studio album was released in October 2013 on Levande Begravd records (who made only 500 physical copies), before being remixed and rereleased by Sulatron records in 2014. Their Sea of Dust EP was then released by Ultraljud records in 2015, followed by their second album, At the Center of All Infinity (released by Kommun2 and Sulatron records), in December of the same year.

Cassette versions of the band's second and debut albums were released by Urtod Void records in 2016 and 2017 respectively.

The band's third studio album, The Outskirts of Reality, was released in January 2020, through Sound Effect records in Greece and Kommun 2 records in Sweden. The album's artwork was created by artist Påhl Sundström.

== Musical style and influences ==
Yuri Gagarin incorporates elements of space rock, combined with other genres, such as post-metal and stoner rock. Their music features multiple overlaid guitar tracks and vintage synthesizers, with effects such as analog delay, reverb, echo, and others associated with psychedelic music.

The band's style has been compared to that of groups such as Hawkwind, Neu!, Nektar, Pink Floyd, and Eloy; however, the band does not cite any specific performers as collective influences for their musical style.

== Band members ==
=== Current members ===
- Christian "Crille" Lindberg – lead guitar
- Jon Eriksson – rhythm guitar
- Leif Göransson – bass guitar
- Robin Klockerman – synthesizer
- Stefan "Steffo" Johansson – drums

== Discography ==
=== Studio albums ===
- Yuri Gagarin (2013)
- At the Center of All Infinity (2015)
- The Outskirts of Reality (2020)

=== Extended plays ===
- Sea of Dust (2015)
