= Thianwan Wannapho =

Thai merchant

Thianwan
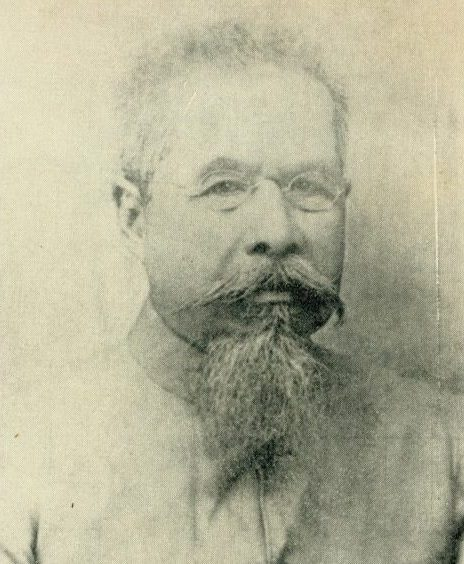
- Born: Thian (Thai: เทียน); 1842; Thonburi, Siam
- Died: 1915 (aged 72–73); Woeng Nakhon Khasem, Bangkok, Siam
- Occupation: Writer
- Children: 16
- Writing career
- Pen name: Tor Wor Sor Wannapho; ต.ว.ส. วัณณาโภ
- Language: Thai

Thianwan Wannapho (1842–1915) was a Thai merchant, attorney, and advocate of modernization.

== Early career ==
Thianwan was born as Thian (Thai: เทียน) in 1842 to a commoner family in Thonburi with claims of distant noble ancestry, and was educated in the temples and at court. He started his career as a merchant, traveling as far afield as Singapore for trade, before pursuing a second career as a lawyer. During his legal career, he was an advocate for the poor against the abuses and corruption of the Thai upper class. His outspokenness drew the antipathy of the powerful ruling class, and he was sentenced to life imprisonment on a technicality in 1882, but was released in 1898.

== Advocating modernization ==
After his release from prison, Thianwan became a vigorous advocate of modernization and Westernization. He wrote under the pseudonym Tor Wor Sor Wannapho, and several of his critical writings prompted responses from the ruling king, Rama V. He called for the establishment of an elected parliament, prohibition of gambling, opium, and betel, and abolition of slavery and polygamy, though he also criticized the economic domination of Thailand by European nations. He also argued for significantly increased access to education and engagement in civic life for women. Apart from these more substantive critiques, he also adopted Western-style dress, including a beard, and claimed to be the first man in Siam with a Western-style haircut. He died in his own house in Woeng Nakhon Khasem during Rattanakosin Sok 133 (1914/1915 AD).

== Legacy ==
Many of the policies called for by Thianwan were eventually implemented. King Rama V abolished slavery in the latter part of his reign, and later polygamy was also formally banned (though persisting in practice). Even Thianwan's sartorial preferences became widespread, with many forms of traditional dress being discouraged by order of the Phibun administration.
