= Västra Bispgården =

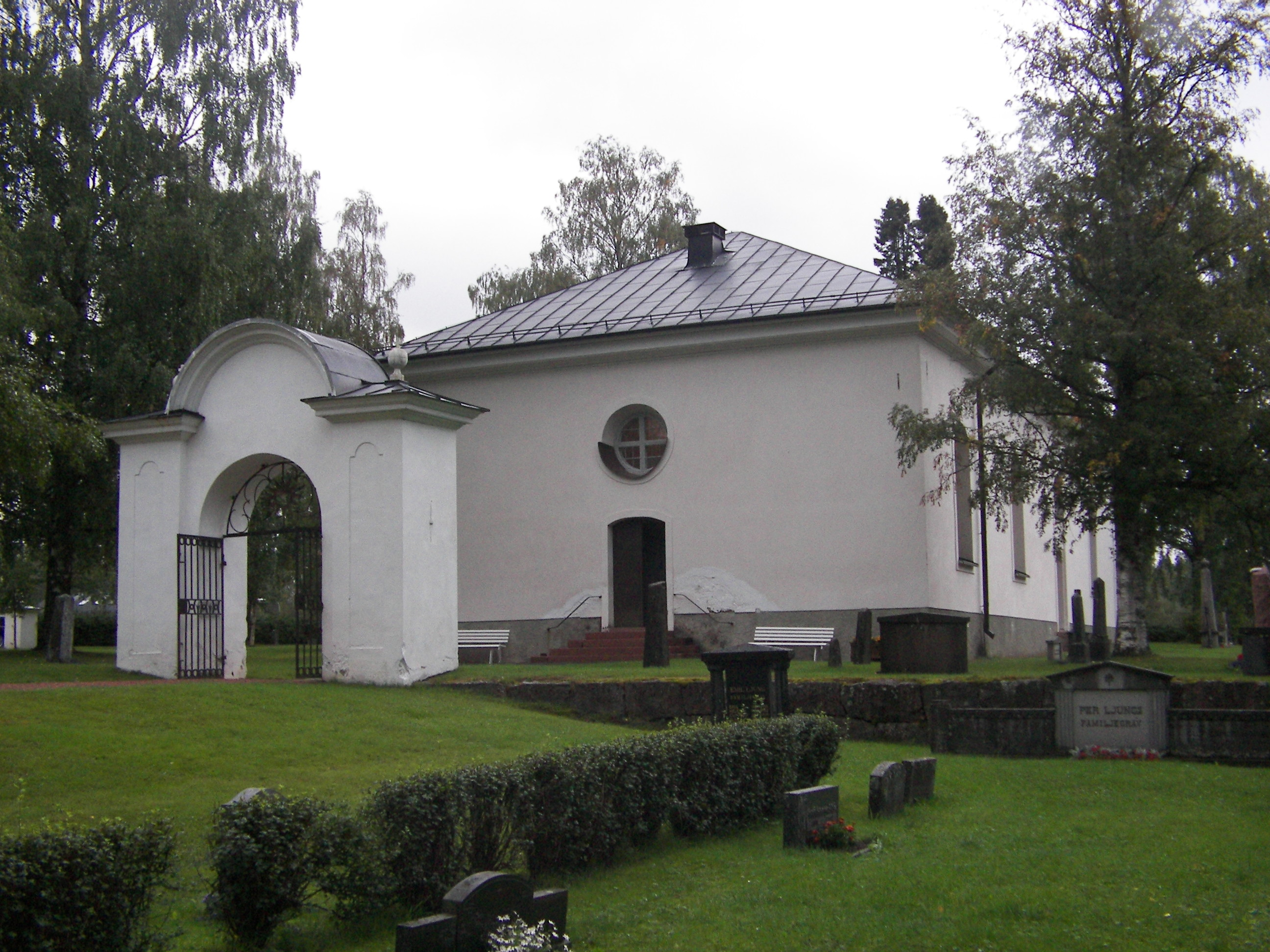

- Location within Jämtland Location within Sweden
- Coordinates: 63°02′N 16°37′E
- Country: Sweden
- Province: Jämtland
- County: Jämtland County
- Municipality: Ragunda Municipality

Area
  - Total: 1.42 km^{2} (0.55 sq mi)

Population (31 December 2010)
  - Total: 518
  - Density: 364/km^{2} (940/sq mi)
- Time zone: UTC+1 (CET)
  - Summer (DST): UTC+2 (CEST)

Västra Bispgården is a locality situated in Ragunda Municipality, Jämtland County, Sweden with 518 inhabitants in 2010.
