= Stugun =

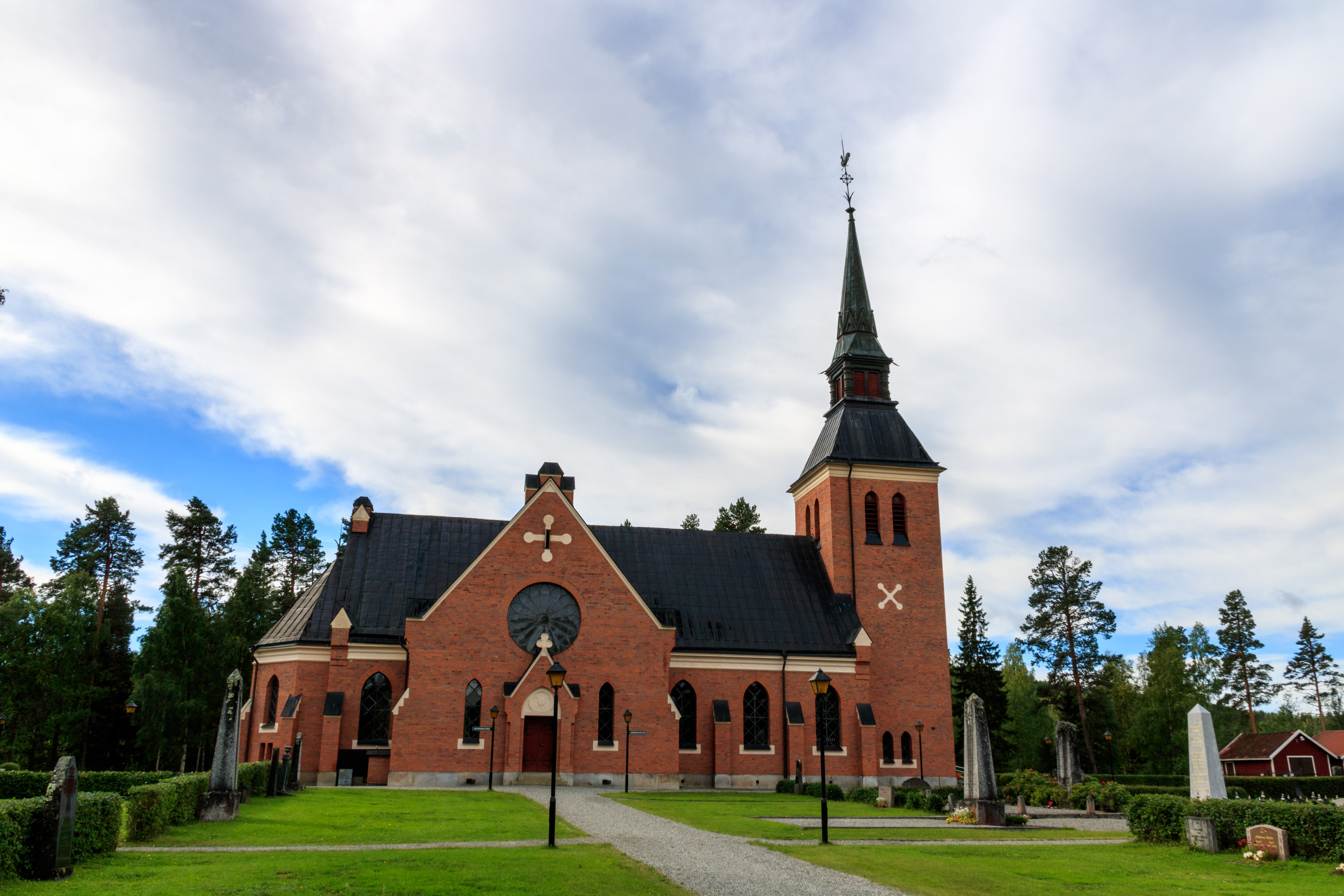
- Stugun Church

- Location within Jämtland Location within Sweden
- Coordinates: 63°10′N 15°36′E
- Country: Sweden
- Province: Jämtland
- County: Jämtland County
- Municipality: Ragunda Municipality

Area
  - Total: 1.24 km^{2} (0.48 sq mi)

Population (31 December 2010)
  - Total: 659
  - Density: 531/km^{2} (1,380/sq mi)
- Time zone: UTC+1 (CET)
  - Summer (DST): UTC+2 (CEST)

Stugun is a locality situated in Ragunda Municipality, Jämtland County, Sweden with 659 inhabitants in 2010.
