= King Chulalongkorn Memorial Building =

Commemorative building in Sweden

Coordinates: 62°57′21″N 16°40′35″E

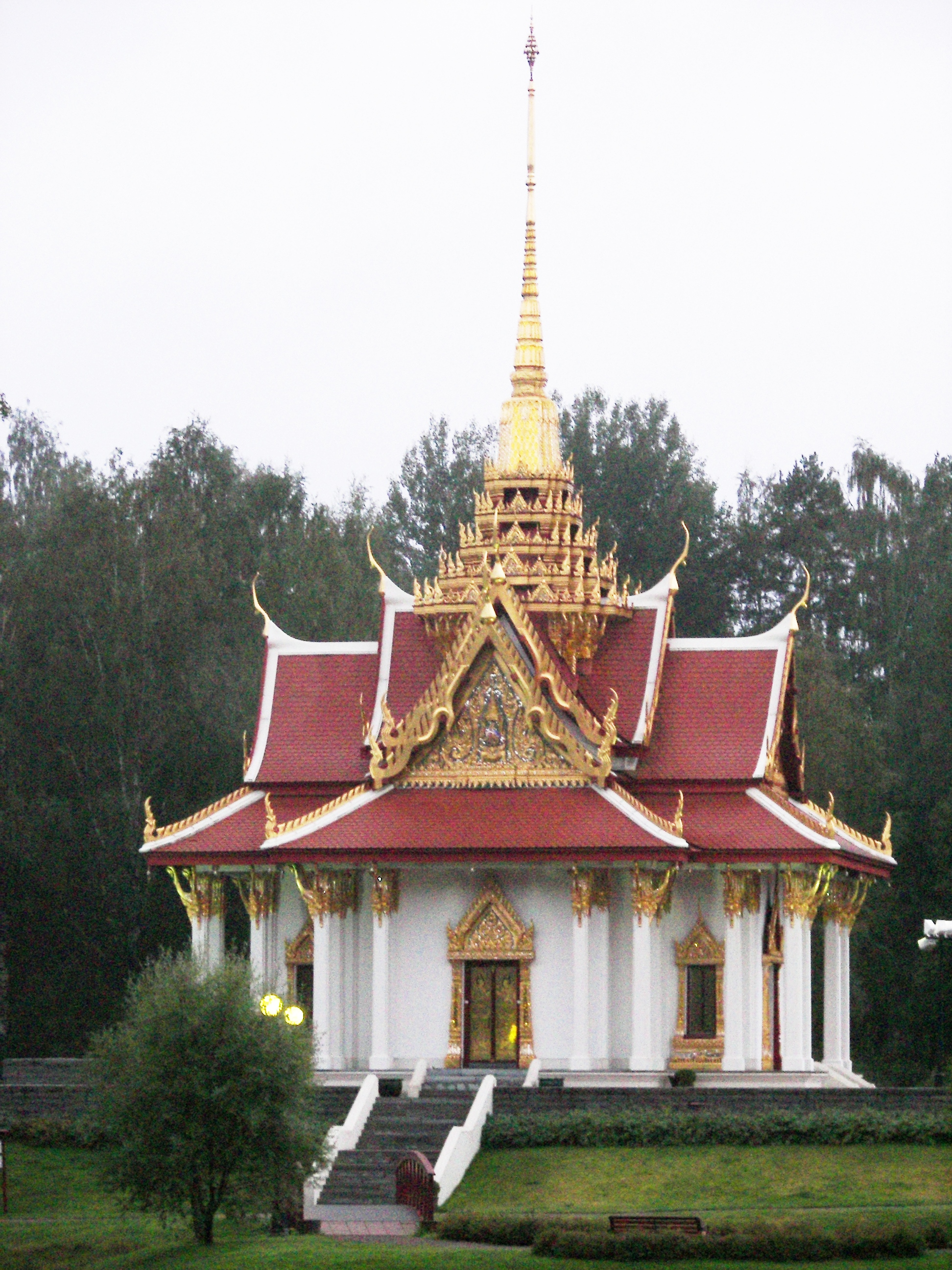
King Chulalongkorn Memorial Building

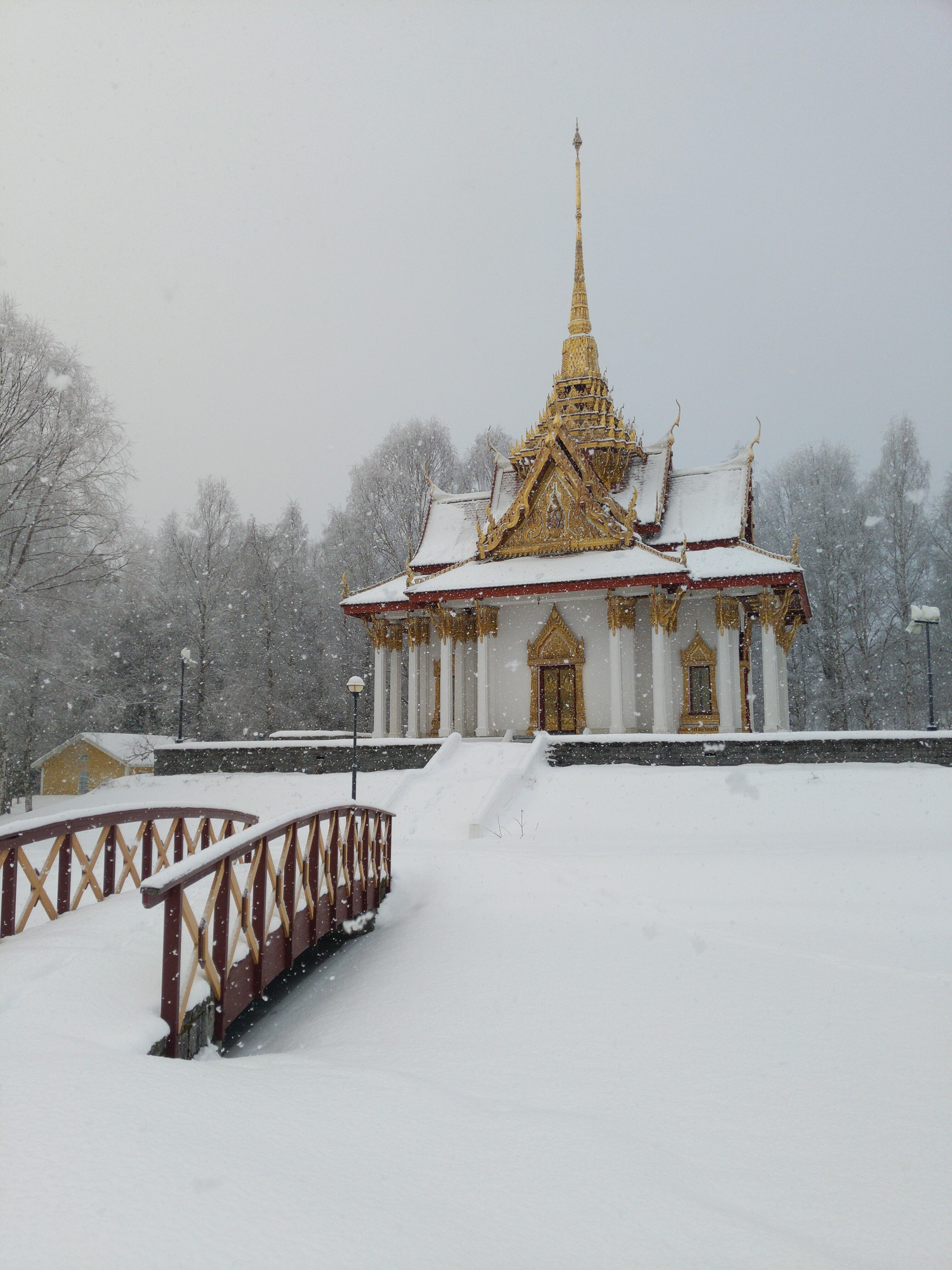
King Chulalongkorn Memorial Building, during winter snowfall

Short film of Chulalongkorn arriving at the General Art and Industrial Exposition of Stockholm on 13 July 1897

The King Chulalongkorn Memorial Building (Swedish: Kung Chulalongkorns minnesbyggnad; Thai: พระบรมราชานุสรณ์พระบาทสมเด็จพระจุลจอมเกล้าเจ้าอยู่หัว), also known as the Thai Pavilion (Swedish: Thailändska Paviljongen), is a Thai pavilion (sala Thai) in Utanede, Ragunda Municipality, Sweden. It was built to commemorate the 1897 visit of King Chulalongkorn of Siam to the area during his visit to Sweden, where he met King Oscar II of Sweden and Norway. Construction began in August 1997, and the building was inaugurated on 19 July 1998, on the 101st anniversary of Chulalongkorn's visit.

The pavilion is designed in the style of a royal Thai pavilion (prasat). It has a floor area of 75 square metres and is topped by a gilded spire. Its roof is supported by 24 white concrete pillars, and the structure has four entrances.

Construction cost approximately ten million Swedish kronor, including about three million kronor for decorative work. The project was financed through donations and sponsorship in Thailand and Sweden. Thai royal artisans carried out the decoration, while companies from Jämtland handled the main construction.

A bronze statue of King Chulalongkorn stands inside the pavilion. Despite its traditional Thai architectural style, the building is not a religious shrine and has no direct connection to Buddhism.
