= Chulalongkorn =

King of Siam from 1868 to 1910

Chulalongkorn; จุฬาลงกรณ์
- King Rama V
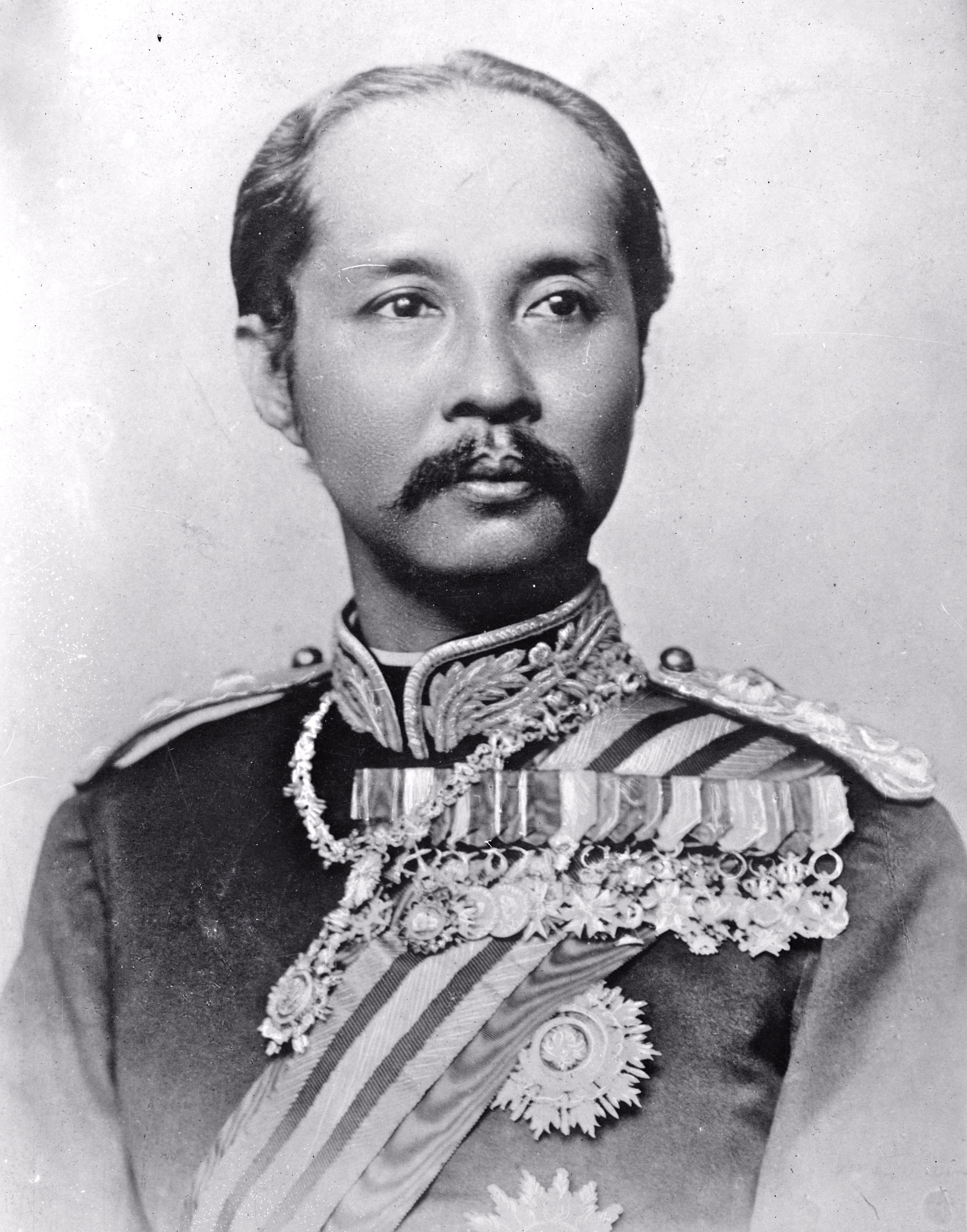
- Formal portrait, c. 1880

King of Siam
- Reign: 1 October 1868 – 23 October 1910
- Coronations: 11 November 1868; 16 November 1873
- Predecessor: Mongkut (Rama IV)
- Successor: Vajiravudh (Rama VI)
- Regent: Sri Suriwongse (1868–1873); Saovabha Phongsri (1897); Vajiravudh (1907)
- Viceroy: Wichaichan (1868–1885)
- Born: 20 September 1853; Bangkok, Siam
- Died: 23 October 1910 (aged 57); Bangkok, Siam
- Spouses: Sunanda Kumariratana; Sukhumala Marasri; Savang Vadhana; Saovabha Phongsri; 5 other consorts; 143 concubines
- Issue more...: Vajirunhis, Crown Prince of Siam; Vajiravudh (Rama VI); Mahidol Adulyadej, Prince of Songkhla; Prajadhipok (Rama VII)
- Dynasty: Chakri
- Father: Mongkut (Rama IV)
- Mother: Debsirindra
- Religion: Theravada Buddhism

Chulalongkorn (Note: Thai: จุฬาลงกรณ์, RTGS: Chulalongkon) (20 September 1853 – 23 October 1910), posthumously honoured as King Chulalongkorn the Beloved, (Note: Thai title: Phra Piya Maharat (Thai: พระปิยมหาราช)) was the fifth king of Siam from the Chakri dynasty, titled Rama V. Chulalongkorn's reign from 1868 until his death in 1910 was characterised by the modernisation of Siam, governmental and social reforms, and territorial concessions to the British and French empires. As Siam was surrounded by European colonies, Chulalongkorn, through his policies and acts, ensured the independence of Siam.

Chulalongkorn was born as the son of Mongkut, the fourth king of Siam. In 1868, he travelled with his father to observe the solar eclipse of 18 August 1868 in Prachuap Khiri Khan Province. During that trip, Chulalongkorn and his father both contracted malaria which resulted in his father's death, and his accession to the throne. The 1893 Franco-Siamese crisis and Haw wars took place during his reign. All his reforms were dedicated to ensuring Siam's independence given the increasing encroachment of Western powers. Chulalongkorn's success earned him the epithet Phra Piya Maharat or the Great Beloved King. (Note: Thai: พระปิยมหาราช)

== Early life ==
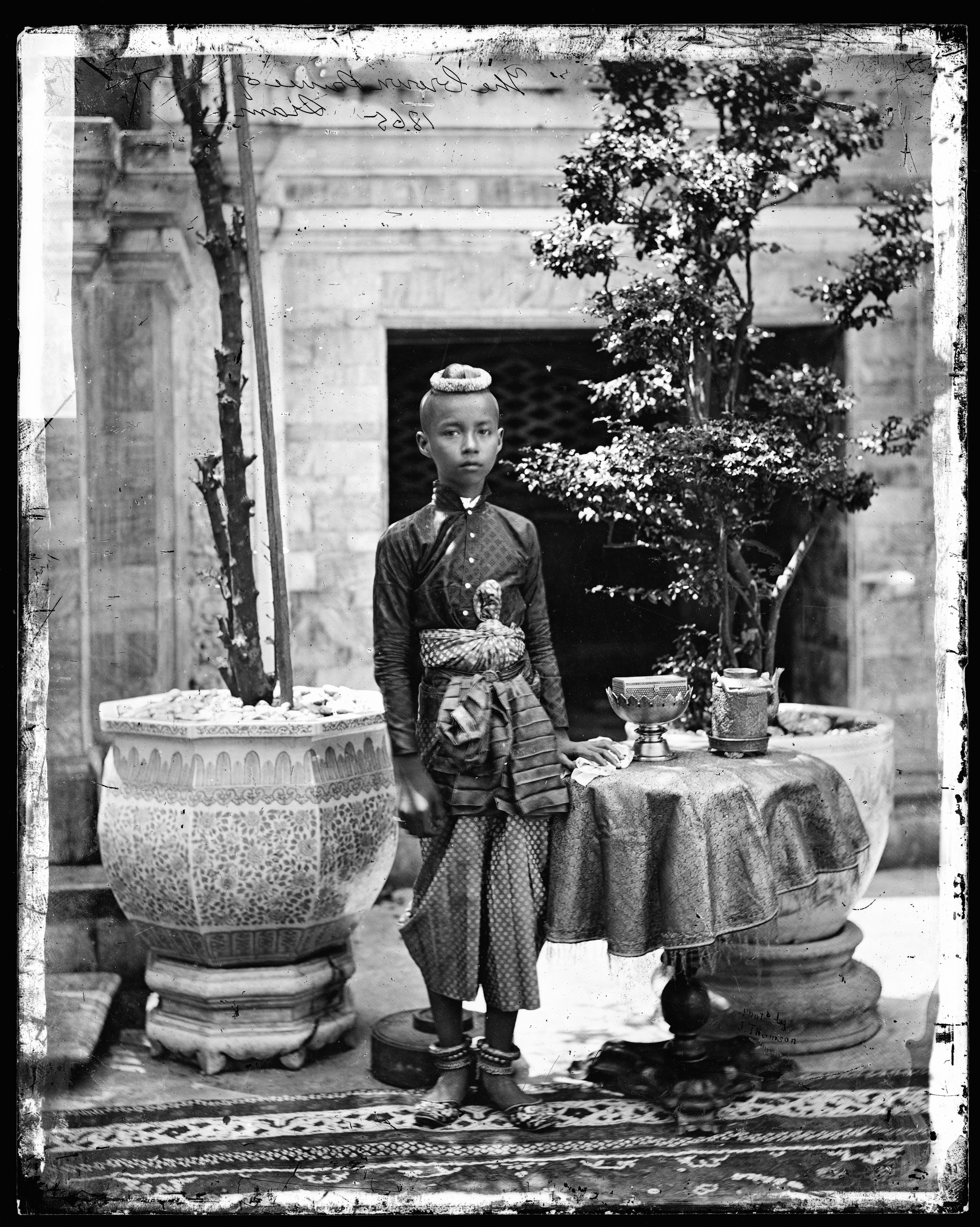
Young crown prince of Siam.

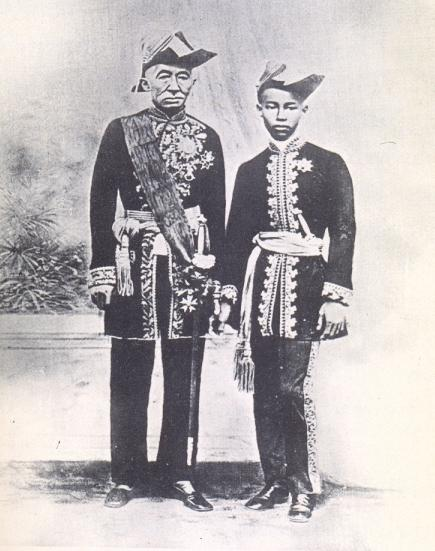
King Mongkut with Prince Chulalongkorn, both in western-style court uniforms, c. 1868.

Chulalongkorn was born on 20 September 1853 to King Mongkut and Queen Debsirindra. In his lifetime, Mongkut had 39 wives and concubines with whom he had 82 children. Chulalongkorn was neither Mongkut's first child or first son, but was made the heir presumptive as the first son born to Debsirindra. During Mongkut's reign, Siam came under increasing pressure from European colonial ambitions, specifically from the British in Burma and Malaya, and the French in Indochina. These pressures jeopardised Siamese independence. Although Mongkut pushed for reforms, he was aware much of it would be carried out by his successor. As such, he began preparing Chulalongkorn to become an innovative king.

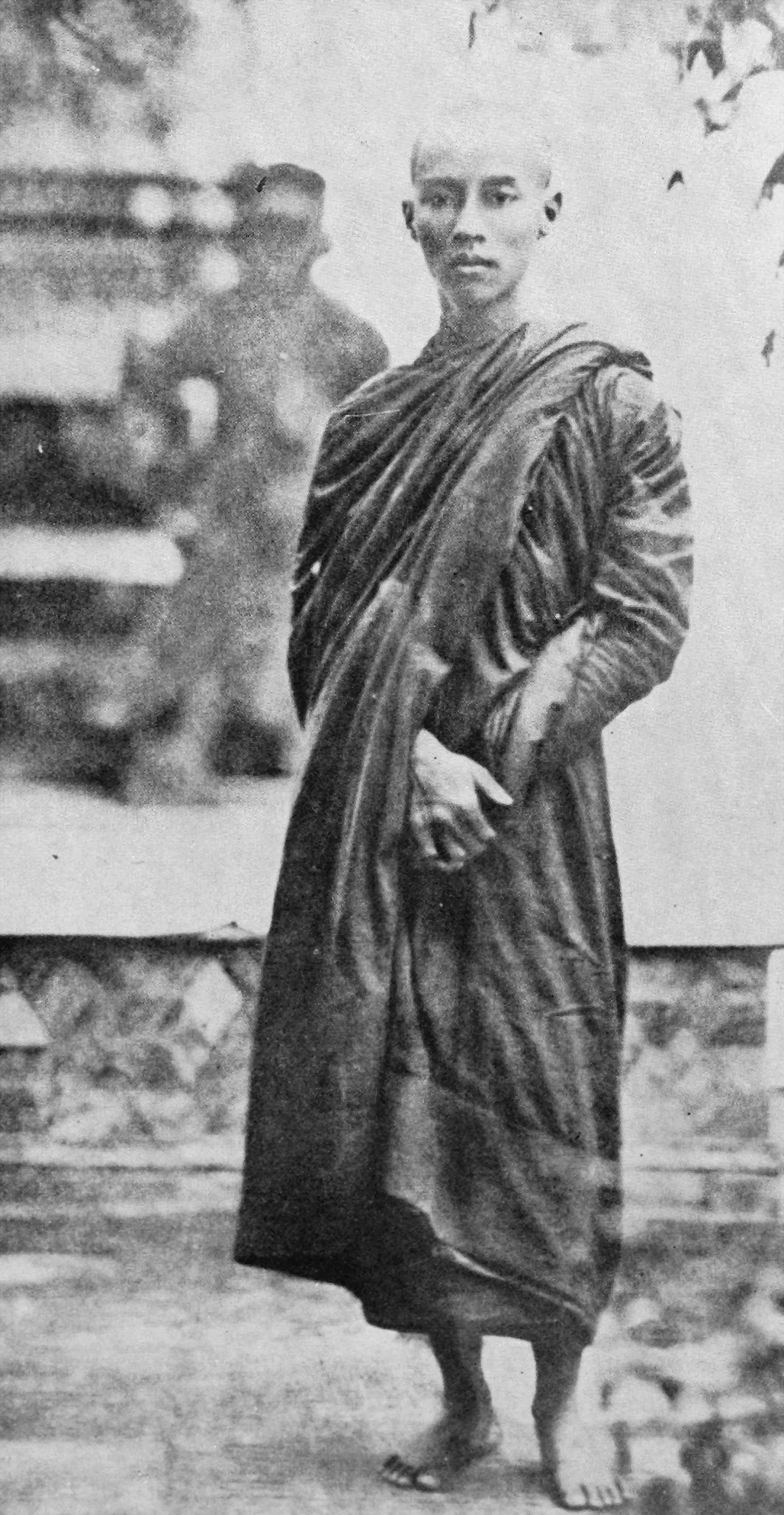
Chualongkorn, the future King Rama V. of Thailand during his temporary ordination as a Buddhist monk, 1873. Photo taken at Rathansattan Montiraram in the Grand Palace.

From age 7, the prince began learning under the guidance of royal lecturers who gave him a more traditional education. Under this, Chulalongkorn was taught Buddhism, Pali, historical chronicles, royal practices, rituals, Siamese writing, military command and fencing. In 1866, he became a novice monk for six months at Wat Bawonniwet according to royal tradition. Additionally, he was educated by Western teachers who taught him science, English and French. Among these Western tutors was Anna Leonowens, who taught the prince and some of his siblings between 1862 and 1867. Chulalongkorn became friends with her son Louis, which continued into their adulthood. Mongkut himself also played a large direct role in Chulalongkorn's education. From age 7, Mongkut maintained his son by his side where he involved him with the daily matters of Siam to allow Chulalongkorn to understand how to rule. Through this, Mongkut passed down his desires for reform.

In 1868, Chulalongkorn accompanied his father on an expedition to Wa Ko, south of Hua Hin, to observe and validate Mongkut's predictions made for the solar eclipse of 18 August. Mongkut proved correct, being more accurate than some French astronomists. However, both he and his son became ill from malaria. In Bangkok, Mongkut died on October 1, 1868. He had yet to designate a successor, leaving the choice to a council who chose Chulalongkorn. The accession council was headed by Sri Suriyawongse (Chuang Bunnag) of the Bunnag family, and was made up of the Supreme Patriarch, prelates, princes and noblemen. Nominated by Prince Deves, Chulalongkorn was unanimously chosen. However, since he was only 15-years old, Chuang served as regent until he became 20-years old. Additionally, Wichaichan was chosen as the viceroy – a choice normally made by the monarch. To Chuang, Wichaichan could serve as an ally if Chulalongkorn ever opposed him.

=== Regency ===
The young Chulalongkorn was an enthusiastic reformer. He visited Singapore and Java in 1871 and British India in 1872 to study the administration of British colonies. He toured the administrative centres of Calcutta, Delhi, Bombay, and back to Calcutta in early 1872. This journey was a source of his later ideas for the modernization of Siam. He was crowned king in his own right as Rama V on 16 November 1873.

Sri Suriwongse then arranged for the Front Palace of King Pinklao (who was his uncle) to be bequeathed to King Pinklao's son, Prince Yodyingyot (who was Chulalongkorn's cousin).

As regent, Sri Suriwongse wielded great influence. Sri Suriwongse continued the works of King Mongkut. He supervised the digging of several important khlongs, such as Padung Krungkasem and Damneun Saduak, and the paving of roads such as Charoen Krung and Silom. He was also a patron of Thai literature and performing arts.

== Early reign ==
Monarchs of the Chakri dynasty
- Phutthayotfa Chulalok (Rama I)
- Phutthaloetla Naphalai (Rama II)
- Nangklao (Rama III)
- Mongkut (Rama IV)
- Chulalongkorn (Rama V)
- Vajiravudh (Rama VI)
- Prajadhipok (Rama VII)
- Ananda Mahidol (Rama VIII)
- Bhumibol Adulyadej (Rama IX)
- Vajiralongkorn (Rama X)

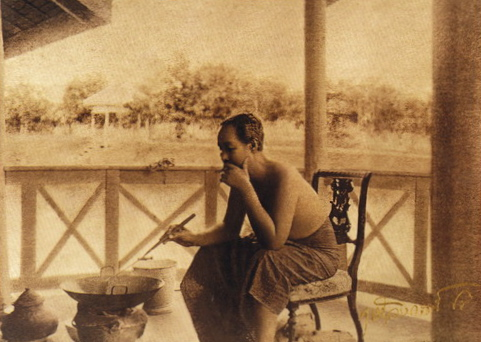
King Chulalongkorn of Siam, cooking and smoking, while on one of his royal trips in 1890.

At the end of his regency, Sri Suriwongse was raised to Somdet Chao Phraya, the highest title a noble could attain. Si Suriyawongse was the most powerful noble of the 19th century. His family, the House of Bunnag, was a powerful aristocratic dynasty of Persian descent. It dominated Siamese politics since the reign of Rama I. Chulalongkorn then married four of his half-sisters, all daughters of Mongkut: Savang Vadhana, Saovabha Phongsri, and Sunanda Kumariratana (Mongkut with Concubine Piam), and Sukhumala Marasri (Mongkut with Concubine Samli).

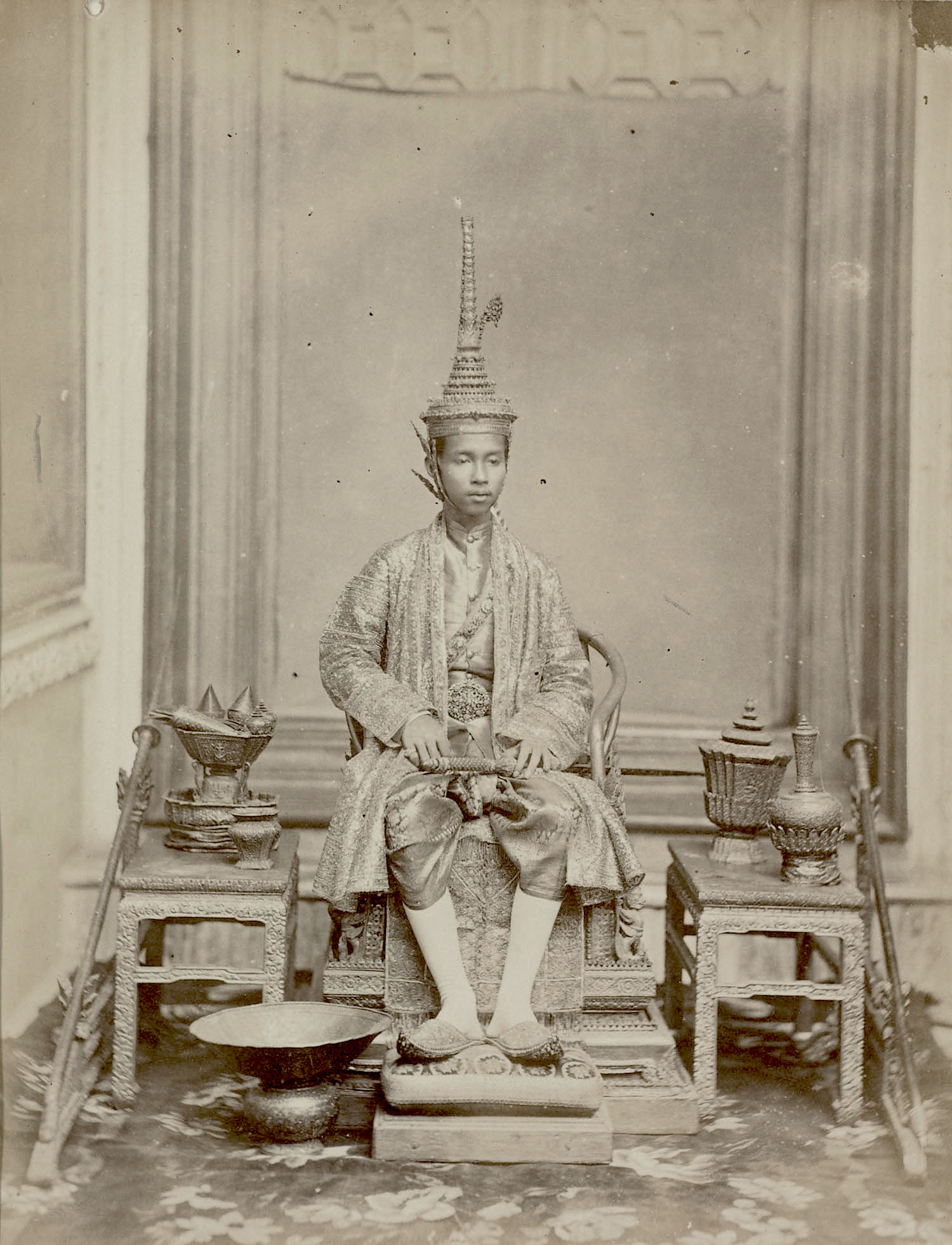
King Chulalongkorn in his first coronation ceremony on his first coronation 11 November 1868.

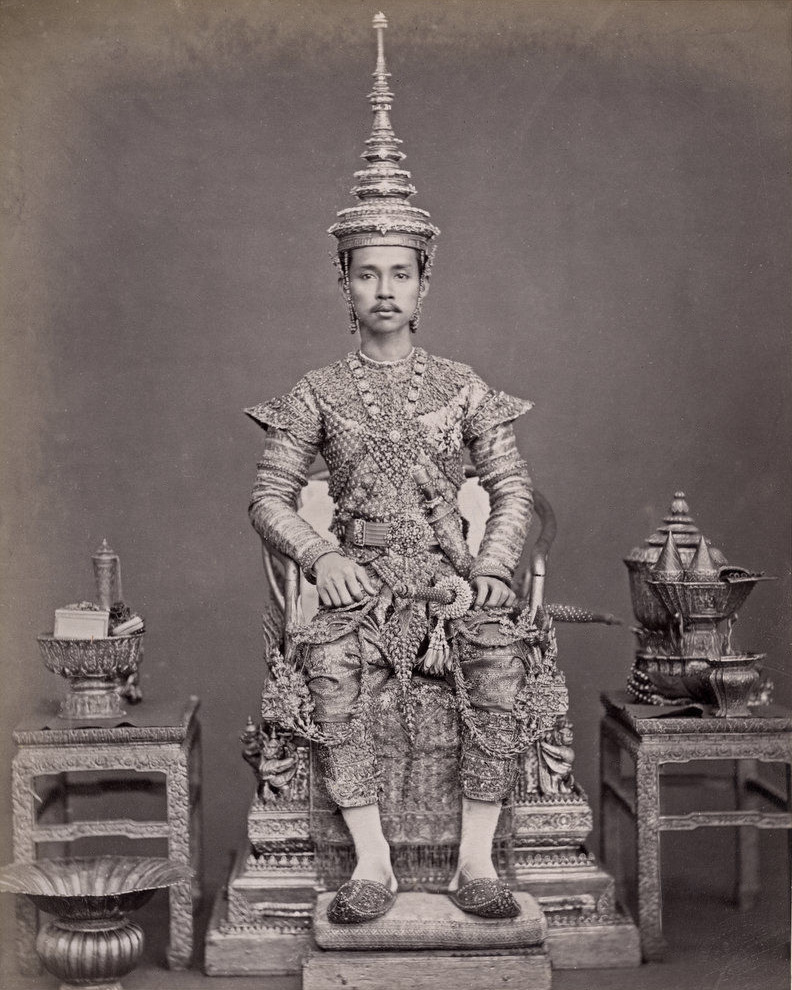
King Chulalongkorn after his second coronation ceremony on 16 November 1873

Chulalongkorn's first reform was to establish the "Auditory Office" (Th: หอรัษฎากรพิพัฒน์) on 4 June 1873, solely responsible for tax collection, to counter the influence of the Bunnag family who had been in control of wealth collection since early Rattanakosin. As tax collectors had been under the aegis of various nobles and thus a source of their wealth, this reform caused great consternation among the nobility, especially the Front Palace. Chulalongkorn appointed Chaturonrasmi to be an executive of the organization, which he closely oversaw. From the time of King Mongkut, the Front Palace had been the equivalent of a "second king", with one-third of national revenue allocated to it. Prince Yodyingyot of the Front Palace was known to be on friendly terms with many Britons, at a time when Siamese relations with the British Empire were tense.

In 1874, Chulalongkorn established the Council of State as a legislative body and a privy council as his personal advisory board based on the British privy council. Council members were appointed by the monarch.

=== Front Palace crisis ===
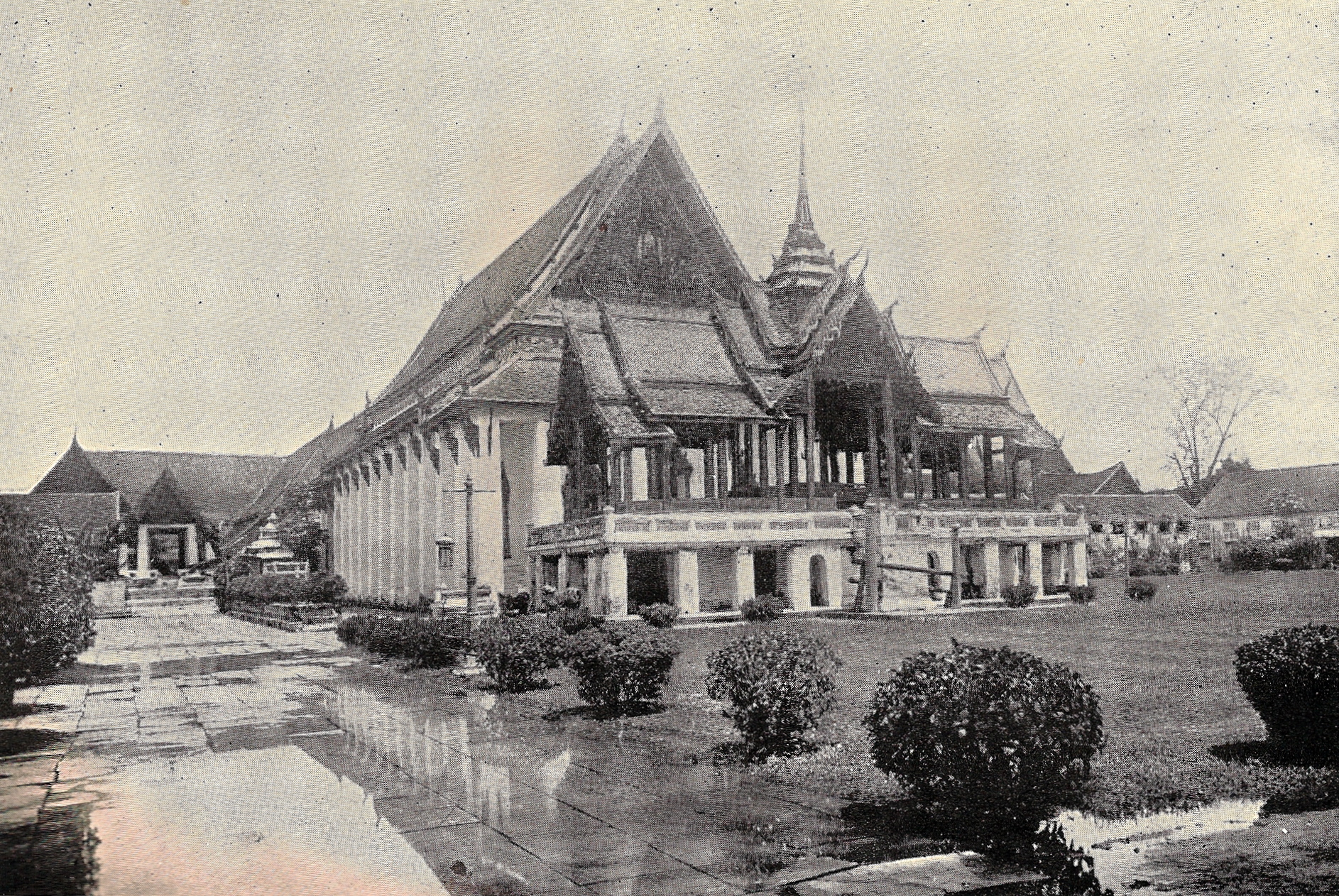
Photograph of the Front Palace or Wang Na (circa 1890) now the Bangkok National Museum

On the night of 28 December 1874, a fire broke out near the gunpowder storehouse and gasworks in the main palace. Front Palace troops quickly arrived, fully armed, "to assist in putting out the fire". They were denied entrance and the fire was extinguished. The incident demonstrated the considerable power wielded by aristocrats and royal relatives, leaving the king little power. Reducing the power held by the nobility became one of his main motives in reforming Siam's feudal politics.

When Prince Yodyingyot died in 1885, Chulalongkorn took the opportunity to abolish the titular Front Palace and created the title of "Crown Prince of Siam" in line with Western custom. Chulalongkorn's son, Prince Vajirunhis, was appointed the first Crown Prince of Siam, though he never reigned. In 1895, when the prince died of typhoid at age 16, he was succeeded by his half-brother Vajiravudh, who was then at boarding school in England.

=== Haw insurgency ===
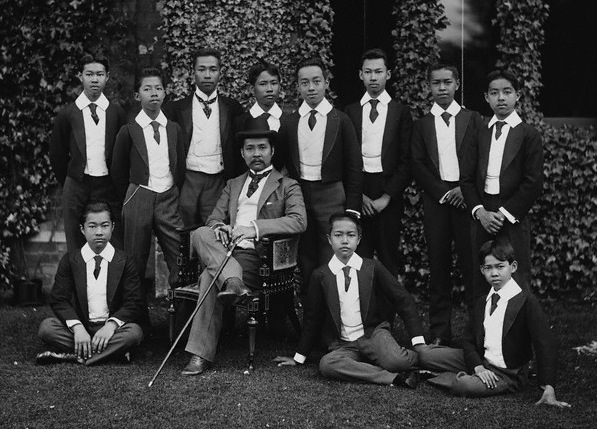
King Chulalongkorn in his western suit with a few of his sons in England 1907, during his second Grand Tour of Europe

In the northern Laotian lands bordering China, the insurgents of the Taiping Rebellion had taken refuge since the reign of King Mongkut. These Chinese were called Haw and became bandits, pillaging the villages. In 1875, Chulalongkorn sent troops from Bangkok to crush the Haw who had ravaged as far as Vientiane. However, they met strong Chinese resistance and retreated to Isan in 1885. New, modernized forces were sent again and were divided into two groups approaching the Haw from Chiang Kam and Pichai. The Haw scattered and some fled to Vietnam. The Siamese armies proceeded to eliminate the remaining Haw. The city of Nong Khai maintains memorials for the Siamese dead.

=== Third Anglo-Burmese War ===
In Burma, while the British Army fought the Burmese Konbaung Dynasty, Siam remained neutral. Britain had agreements with the Siamese government, which stated that if the British were in conflict with Burma, Siam would send food supplies to the British Army. Chulalongkorn honored the agreement. The British expected he would send an army to help defeat the Burmese, but he did not do so.

=== Military and political reforms ===
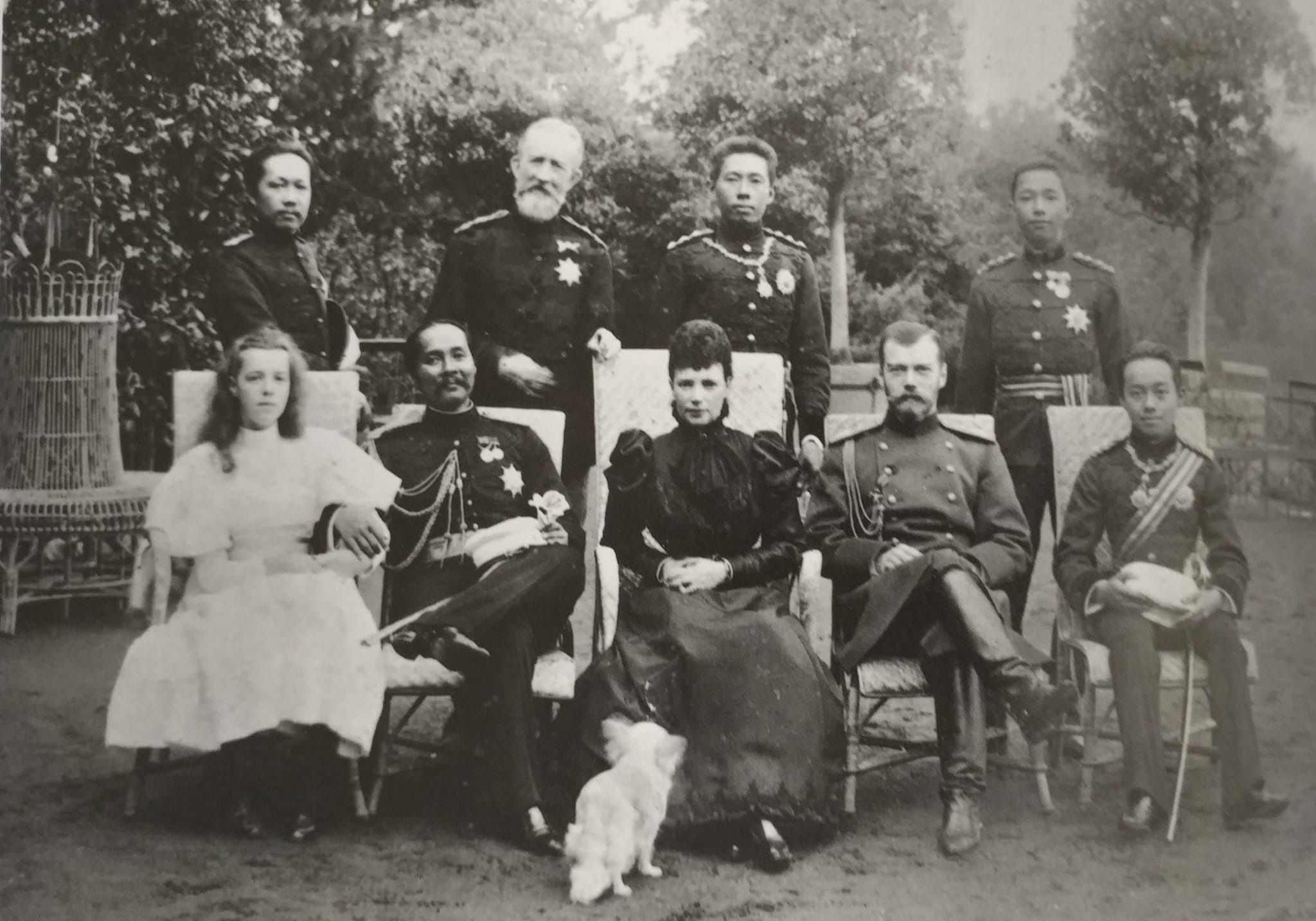
King Chulalongkorn in Russia 1897, with the Tsar Nicholas II and family, at the Alexander Palace. During his reign the king employed his brothers and sons in the government, ensuring royal monopoly on power and administration.

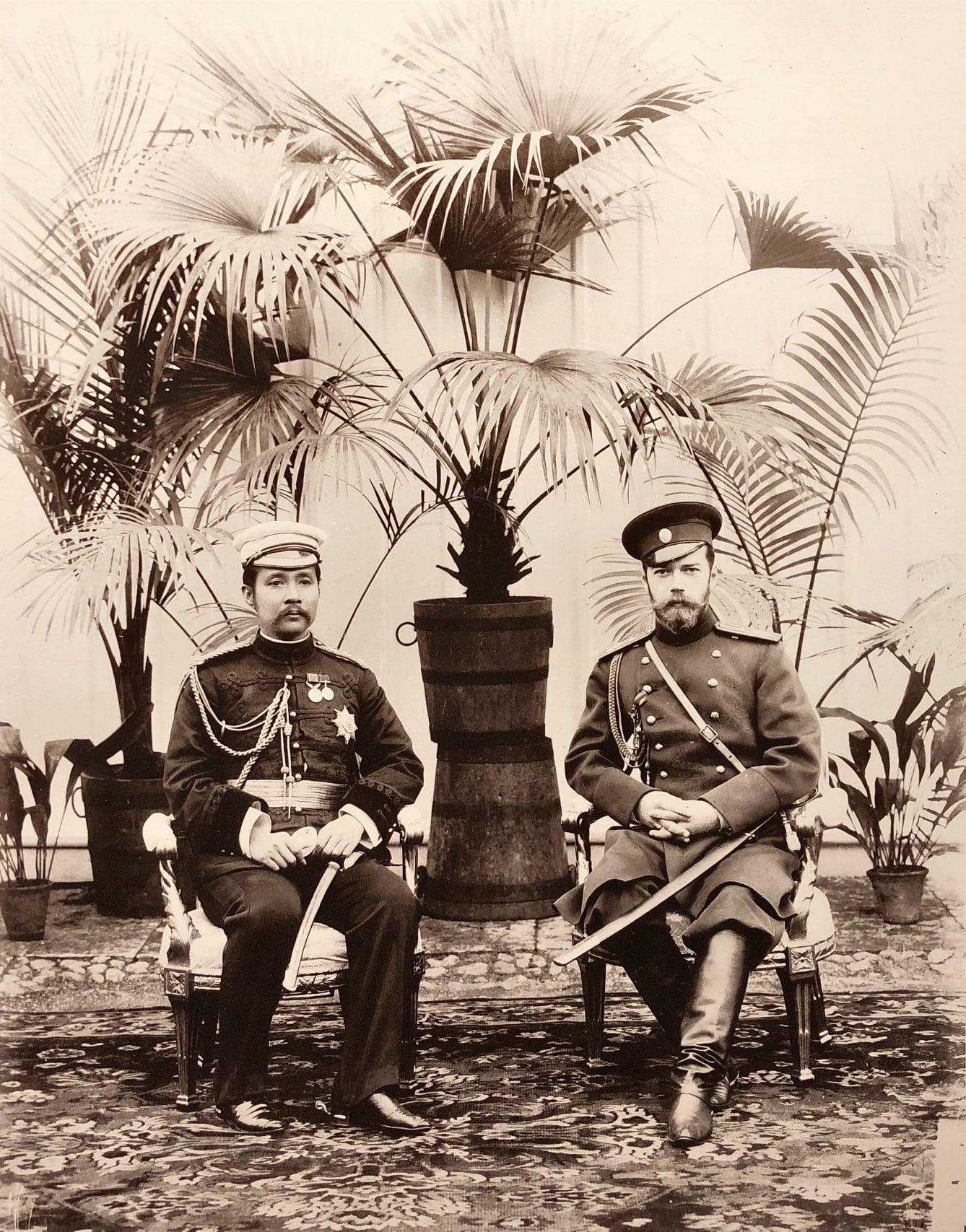
King Chulalongkorn with Tsar Nicholas II in Saint Petersburg, during his first Grand Tour in 1897

Freed of the Front Palace and Chinese rebellions, Chulalongkorn initiated modernization and centralization reforms. He established the Royal Military Academy in 1887 to train officers in Western fashion. His upgraded forces provided the king much more power to centralize the country.

The government of Siam had remained largely unchanged since the 15th century. The central government was headed by the Samuha Nayok (i.e., prime minister), who controlled the northern parts of Siam, and the Samuha Kalahom (i.e., grand commander), who controlled southern Siam in both civil and military affairs. The Samuha Nayok presided over the Chatu Sadombh (i.e., Four Pillars). The responsibilities of each pillar overlapped and were ambiguous. In 1888, Chulalongkorn moved to institute a government of ministries. Ministers were, at the outset, members of the royal family. Ministries were established in 1892, with all ministries having equal status.

The Council of State proved unable to veto legal drafts or to give Chulalongkorn advice because the members regarded Chulalongkorn as an absolute monarch, far above their station. Chulalongkorn dissolved the council altogether and transferred advisory duties to the cabinet in 1894.

Chulalongkorn abolished the traditional Nakorn Bala methods of torture in the judiciary process, which were seen as inhumane and barbaric to Western eyes, and introduced a Western judicial code. His Belgian advisor, Gustave Rolin-Jaequemyns, played a great role in the development of modern Siamese law and its judicial system.

=== Pressures for reform ===
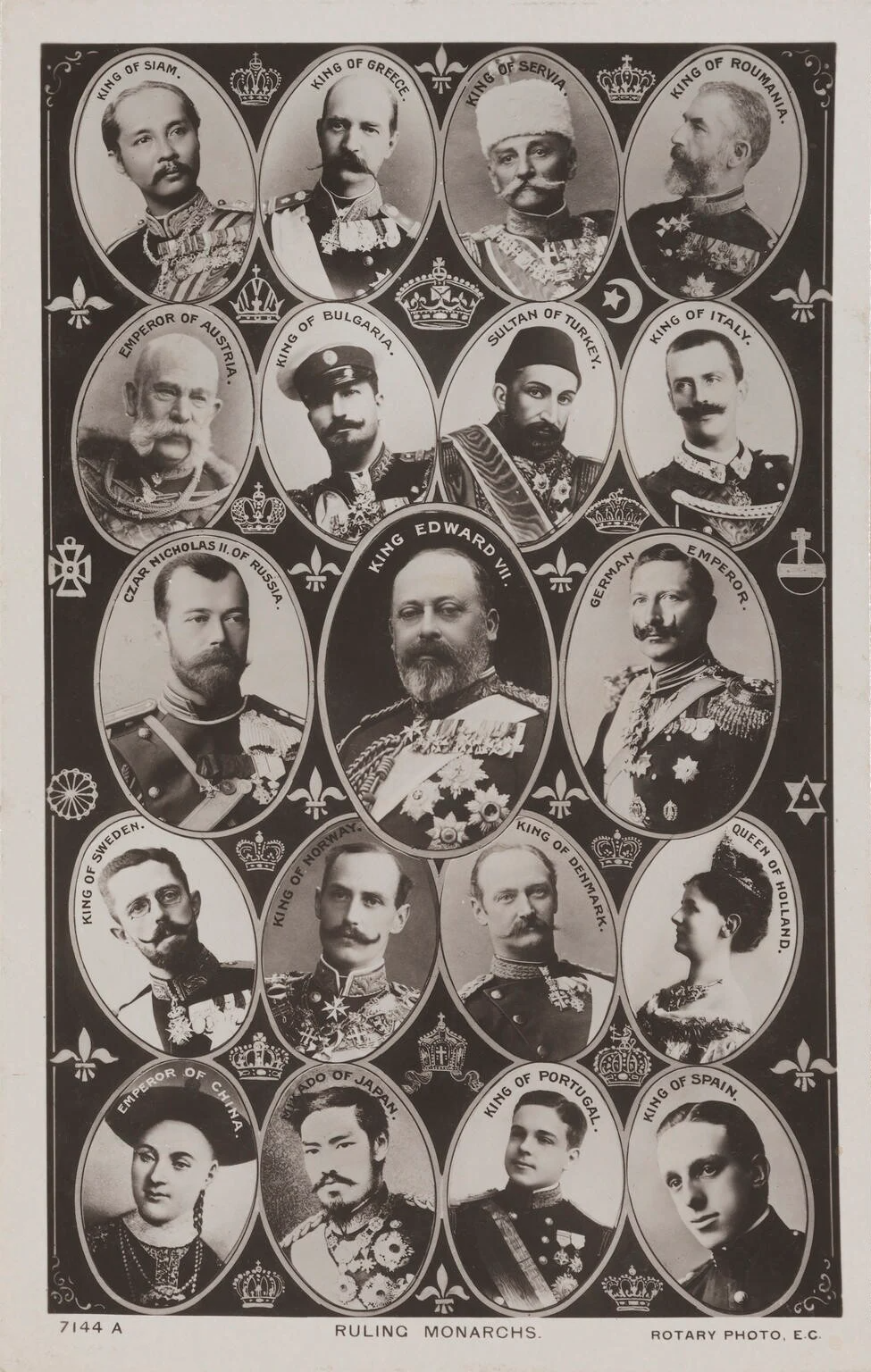
King Chulalongkorn of Siam (Thailand in present-day) and the rulers in the beginning of the 20th century. Left to right: George I of Greece, Peter I of Serbia, Carol I of Romania, Franz Joseph of Austria-Hungary, Ferdinand I of Bulgaria, Abdul Hamid II of the Ottoman Empire, Victor Emmanuel III of Italy, Tsar Nicholas II of Russia, Edward VII of the United Kingdom, Wilhelm II of Prussia, Gustav V of Sweden, Haakon VII of Norway, Frederick VIII of Denmark, Wilhelmina of the Netherlands, Guangxu Emperor of the Chinese Qing Dynasty, Emperor Meiji of Japan, Manuel II of Portugal, Alfonso XIII of Spain.

Chulalongkorn was the first Siamese king to send royal princes to Europe to be educated. In 19th century Europe, nationalism flourished and there were calls for more liberty. The princes were influenced by the liberal notions of democracy and elections they encountered in republics like France and constitutional monarchies like the United Kingdom.

In 1884 (year 103 of the Rattakosin Era), Siamese officials in Europe warned Chulalongkorn of possible threats to Siamese independence from the European powers. They advised that Siam should be reformed like Meiji Japan and that Siam should become a constitutional monarchy. Chulalongkorn demurred, stating that the time was not ripe and that he himself was making reforms.

Throughout Chulalongkorn's reign, writers with radical ideas had their works published for the first time. The most notable ones included Thianwan Wannapho, who had been imprisoned for 17 years and from prison produced many works criticizing traditional Siamese society.

== Conflict with French Indochina ==
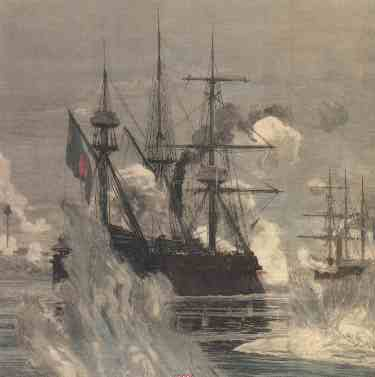
French ships under fire in the Paknam incident, 13 July 1893

RS112 Incident map

In 1863, King Norodom of Cambodia was forced to put his country under French protection. The cession of Cambodia was officially formulated in 1867. However, Inner Cambodia (as called in Siam) consisting of Battambang, Siem Reap, and Srisopon, remained a Siamese possession. This was the first of many territorial cessions.

In 1887, French Indochina was formed from Vietnamese and Cambodian lands. In 1888, French troops invaded northern Laos to subjugate the Heo insurgents. However, the French troops never left, and the French demanded more Laotian lands. In 1893 Auguste Pavie, the French vice-consul of Luang Prabang, requested the cession of all Laotian lands east of the Mekong River. Siam resented the demand, leading to the Franco-Siamese crisis of 1893.

The French gunboat Le Lutin entered the Chao Phraya and anchored near the French consulate ready to attack. Fighting was observed in Laos. Inconstant and Comete were attacked in Chao Phraya, and the French sent an ultimatum: an indemnity of three million francs, as well as the cession of and withdrawal from Laos. Siam did not accept the ultimatum. French troops then blockaded the Gulf of Siam and occupied Chantaburi and Trat. Chulalongkorn sent Rolin-Jacquemyns to negotiate. The issue was eventually settled with the cession of Laos in 1893, but the French troops in Chantaburi and Trat refused to leave.

The cession of vast Laotian lands had a major impact on Chulalongkorn's spirit. Prince Vajirunhis died in January 1895. Prince Vajiravudh was made crown prince to replace him. Chulalongkorn realised the importance of maintaining the navy and established the Royal Thai Naval Academy in 1898.

Despite Siamese concessions, French armies continued the occupation of Chantaburi and Trat for another 10 years. An agreement was reached in 1904 that French troops would leave Chantaburi but hold the coast land from Trat to Koh Kong. In 1906, the final agreement was reached. Trat was returned to Siam but the French kept Koh Kong and received Inner Cambodia.

Short film of Chulalongkorn arriving at the General Art and Industrial Exposition of Stockholm (July 13, 1897)

Seeing the seriousness of foreign affairs, Chulalongkorn visited Europe in 1897. He was the first Siamese monarch to do so, and he desired European recognition of Siam as a fully independent power. He appointed his queen, Saovabha Phongsri, as regent in Siam during his travel to Europe. During a visit to Spain and Portugal, on 26 October, he condemned and ordered his servant to be executed for a breach of etiquette committed in Lisbon, according to the telegram news from Zaragoza.

== Reforms ==
Siam had been composed of a network of cities according to the Mandala system codified by King Trailokanat in 1454, with local rulers owing tribute to Bangkok. Each city retained a substantial degree of autonomy, as Siam was not a "state" but a "network" of city-states. With the rise of European colonialism, the Western concept of state and territorial division was introduced. It had to define explicitly which lands were "Siamese" and which lands were "foreign". The conflict with the French in 1893 was an example.

=== Sukhaphiban districts ===
Sukhaphiban (สุขาภิบาล) sanitary districts were the first sub-autonomous entities established in Thailand. The first such was created in Bangkok, by royal decree of King Chulalongkorn in 1897. During his European tour earlier that year, he had learned about the sanitary districts of England, and wanted to try out this local administrative unit in his capital.

=== Monthon system ===
Monthon map of Thailand, 1906

With his experiences during the travel to British colonies and the suggestion of Prince Damrong, Chulalongkorn established the hierarchical system of monthons in 1897, composed of province, city, amphoe, tambon, and muban (village) in descending order. (Though an entire monthon, the Eastern Province, Inner Cambodia, was ceded to the French in 1906). Each monthon was overseen by an intendant of the Ministry of Interior. This had a major impact, as it ended the power of all local dynasties. Central authority now spread all over the country through the administration of intendants. For example, the Lanna states in the north (including the Kingdom of Chiangmai, Principalities of Lampang, Lamphun, Nan, and Prae, tributaries to Bangkok) were made into two monthons, neglecting the existence of the Lanna kings.

Local rulers did not cede power willingly. Three rebellions sprang up in 1901: the Ngiao rebellion in Phrae, the 1901–1902 Holy Man's Rebellion in Isan, and the Rebellion of Seven Sultans in the south. All these rebellions were crushed in 1902 with the city rulers stripped of their power and imprisoned.

=== Abolition of corvée and slavery ===
Photograph of the Slave Abolition Act of 1905

Ayutthaya King Ramathibodi II established a system of corvée in 1518 after which the lives of Siamese commoners and slaves were closely regulated by the government. All Siamese common men, known as phrai (ไพร่) were subject to the Siamese corvée system. Each man at the time of his majority had to register with a government bureau, department, or leading member of the royalty called krom (กรม) as a phrai luang (ไพร่หลวง) or under a nobleman's dominion, called mun nai or chao khun mun nai (มูลนาย หรือเจ้าขุนมูลนาย) as a phrai som (ไพร่สม). Phrai owed service to sovereign or master for three months of the year. Phrai suai (ไพร่ส่วย) were those who could make payment in kind (cattle) in lieu of service. Those conscripted into military service were called phrai thahan (ไพร่ทหาร).

Chulalongkorn was best known for his abolition of Siamese slavery (ทาส). He associated the abolition of slavery in the United States with the bloodshed of the American Civil War. Chulalongkorn, to prevent such a bloodbath in Siam, provided several steps towards the abolition of slavery, not an extreme turning point from servitude to total freedom. Those who found themselves unable to live on their own sold themselves into slavery by rich noblemen. Likewise, when a debt was defaulted, the borrower would become a slave of the lender. If the debt was redeemed, the slave regained freedom.

However, those whose parents were household slaves (ทาสในเรือนเบี้ย) were bound to be slaves forever because their redemption price was extremely high.

Because of economic conditions, people sold themselves into slavery in great numbers and in turn they produced a large number of household slaves. In 1867 they accounted for one-third of Siamese population. In 1874, Chulalongkorn enacted a law that lowered the redemption price of household slaves born in 1867 (his ascension year) and freed all of them when they had reached 21.

The newly freed slaves would have time to settle themselves as farmers or merchants so they would not become unemployed. In 1905, the Slave Abolition Act ended Siamese slavery in all forms. The reverse of 100 baht banknotes in circulation since the 2005 centennial depict Chulalongkorn in navy uniform abolishing the slave tradition.

The traditional corvée system declined after the Bowring Treaty, which gave rise to a new class of employed labourers not regulated by the government, while many noblemen continued to hold sway over large numbers of Phrai Som. Chulalongkorn needed more effective control of manpower to undo the power of nobility. After the establishment of the monthon system, Chulalongkorn instituted a census to count all men available to the government. The Employment Act of 1900 required that all workers be paid, not forced to work.

=== Establishment of a modern army and modern land ownership ===
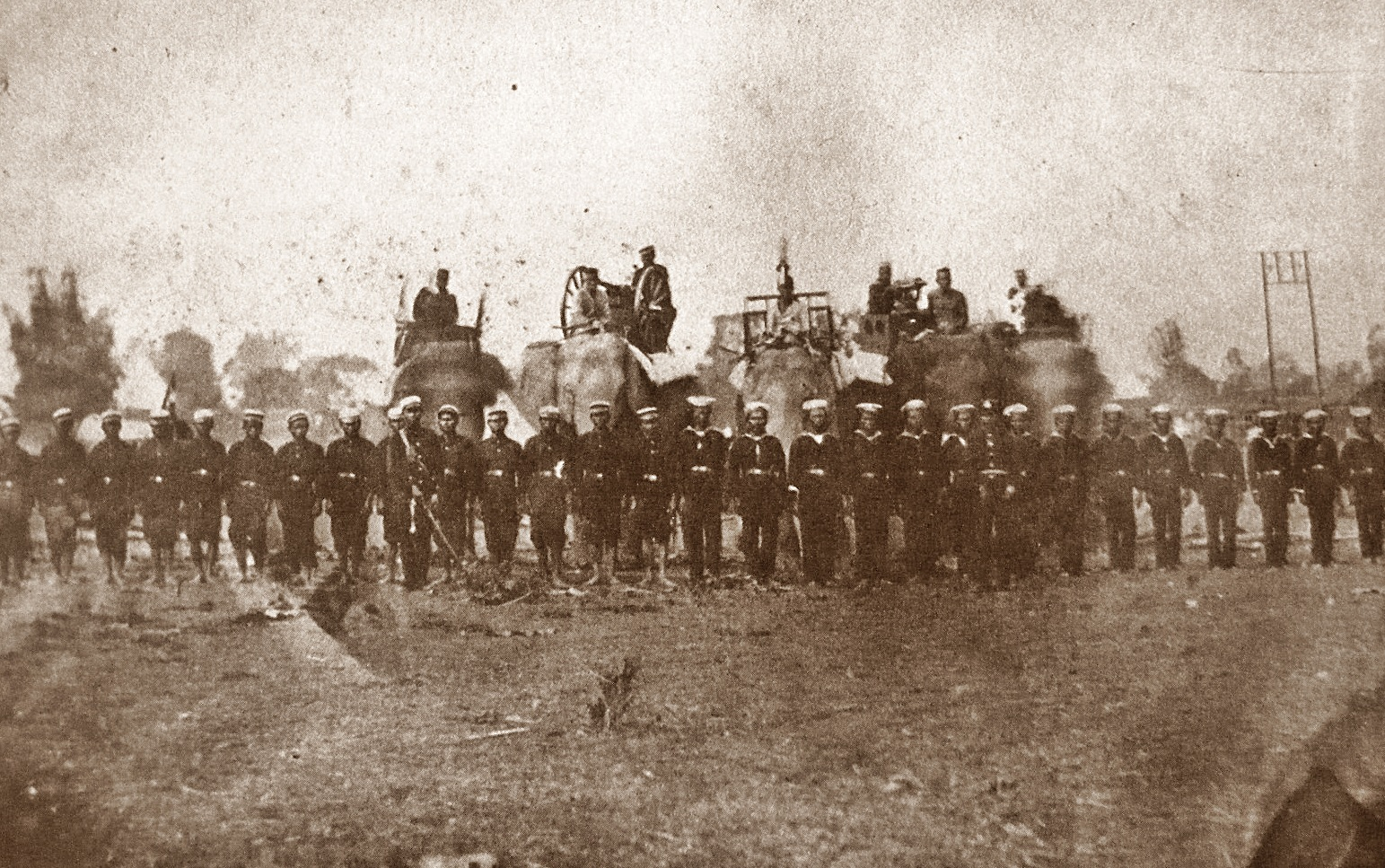
Photograph of the Royal Siamese Army during Rama V's military reforms, during the Haw Wars, 1875

Chulalongkorn had established a defence ministry in 1887. The ending of the corvée system necessitated the beginning of military conscription, thus the Conscription Act of 1905 in Siam. This was followed in 1907 by the first act providing for invoking martial law, which seven years later was changed to its modern form by his son and successor, King Vajiravudh.

The Royal Thai Survey Department, a Special Services Group of the Royal Thai Armed Forces, engaged in cadastral survey, which is the survey of specific land parcels to define ownership for land registration, and for equitable taxation. Land title deeds are issued using the Torrens title system, though it was not until the year 1901 that the first–fruits of this survey were obtained.

=== Abolition of prostration ===
In 1873, the Royal Siamese Government Gazette published an announcement on the abolition of prostration. In it, King Chulalongkorn declared, "The practice of prostration in Siam is severely oppressive. The subordinates have been forced to prostrate in order to elevate the dignity of the phu yai. I do not see how the practice of prostration will render any benefit to Siam. The subordinates find the performance of prostration a harsh physical practice. They have to go down on their knees for a long time until their business with the phu yai ends. They will then be allowed to stand up and retreat. This kind of practice is the source of oppression. Therefore, I want to abolish it." The Gazette directed that, "From now on, Siamese are permitted to stand up before the dignitaries. To display an act of respect, the Siamese may take a bow instead. Taking a bow will be regarded as a new form of paying respect."

=== Civic works ===
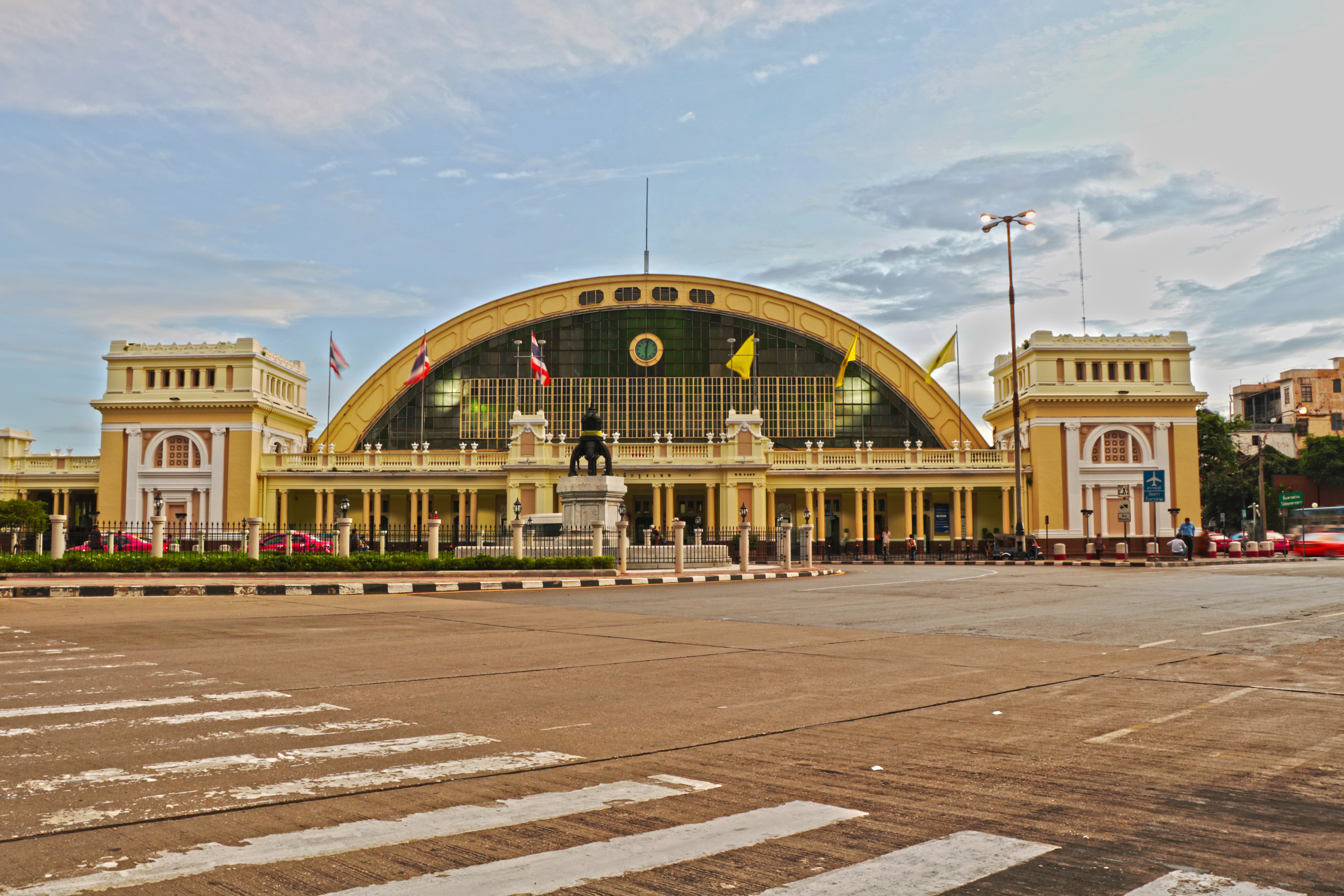
Hua Lamphong railway station, Bangkok's main train station, built by Rama V and completed after Rama V's death

The construction of railways in Siam had a political motivation: to connect all of the country so as to better maintain control of it.

In 1901, the first railway was opened from Bangkok to Korat. In the same year, the first power plant of Siam produced electricity and electric lights first illuminated roadways.

In 1907 he founded the royal rice varieties competition, at first only for the Tung Luang and Rangsit Canal districts. The next year it was held at Wat Suthat and since then has been held at various locations around the kingdom, by Chulalongkorn and his descendants.

=== Relations with the British Empire ===
Siamese authorities had exercised substantial control over Malay sultanates since Ayutthaya times. The sultans sought British support as a counterweight to Siamese influence. In 1909, the Anglo-Siamese Treaty of 1909 was agreed. Four sultanates (Kedah, Kelantan, Terengganu and Perlis) were brought under British influence in exchange for Siamese legal rights and a loan to construct railways in southern Siam.

== Death and legacy ==
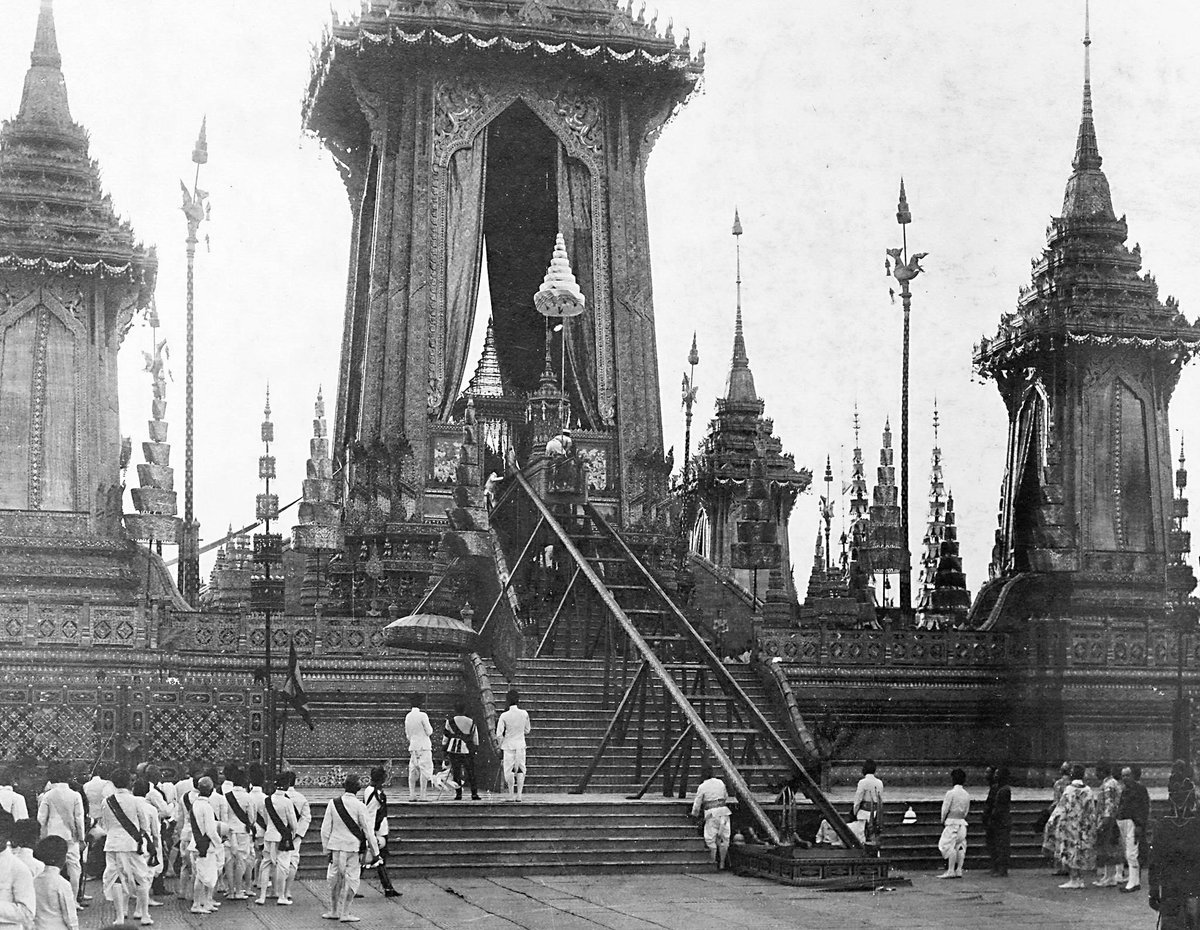
Royal funeral ceremony of King Chulalongkorn in 1911 at Sanam Luang, Bangkok

Chulalongkorn visited Europe twice, in 1897 and 1907. In 1897, he travelled widely through Europe, learning all he could on many subjects to benefit the Siamese people. He travelled and visited many European royal families. He spent much time in Britain and was inspired, among other things, to improve the health of his people by creating public health, or sanitary districts. In Sweden he studied the Forestry system. In 1907, he visited his son's school in Britain and consulted with European doctors in pursuit of a cure for his kidney disease.

King Chulalongkorn died on 23 October 1910 of kidney disease at the Amphorn Sathan Residential Hall in the Dusit Palace, and was succeeded by his son Vajiravudh (King Rama VI).

The royal Equestrian statue of King Chulalongkorn was finished in 1908 to celebrate the 40th anniversary of the king's reign. It was cast in bronze by a Parisian metallurgist.

Chulalongkorn University, founded in 1917 as the first university in Thailand, was named in his honour. On the campus stand the statues of Rama V and his son, Rama VI. King Chulalongkorn Memorial Hospital, operated by the Thai Red Cross Society is named after him and is one of Thailand's largest hospitals.

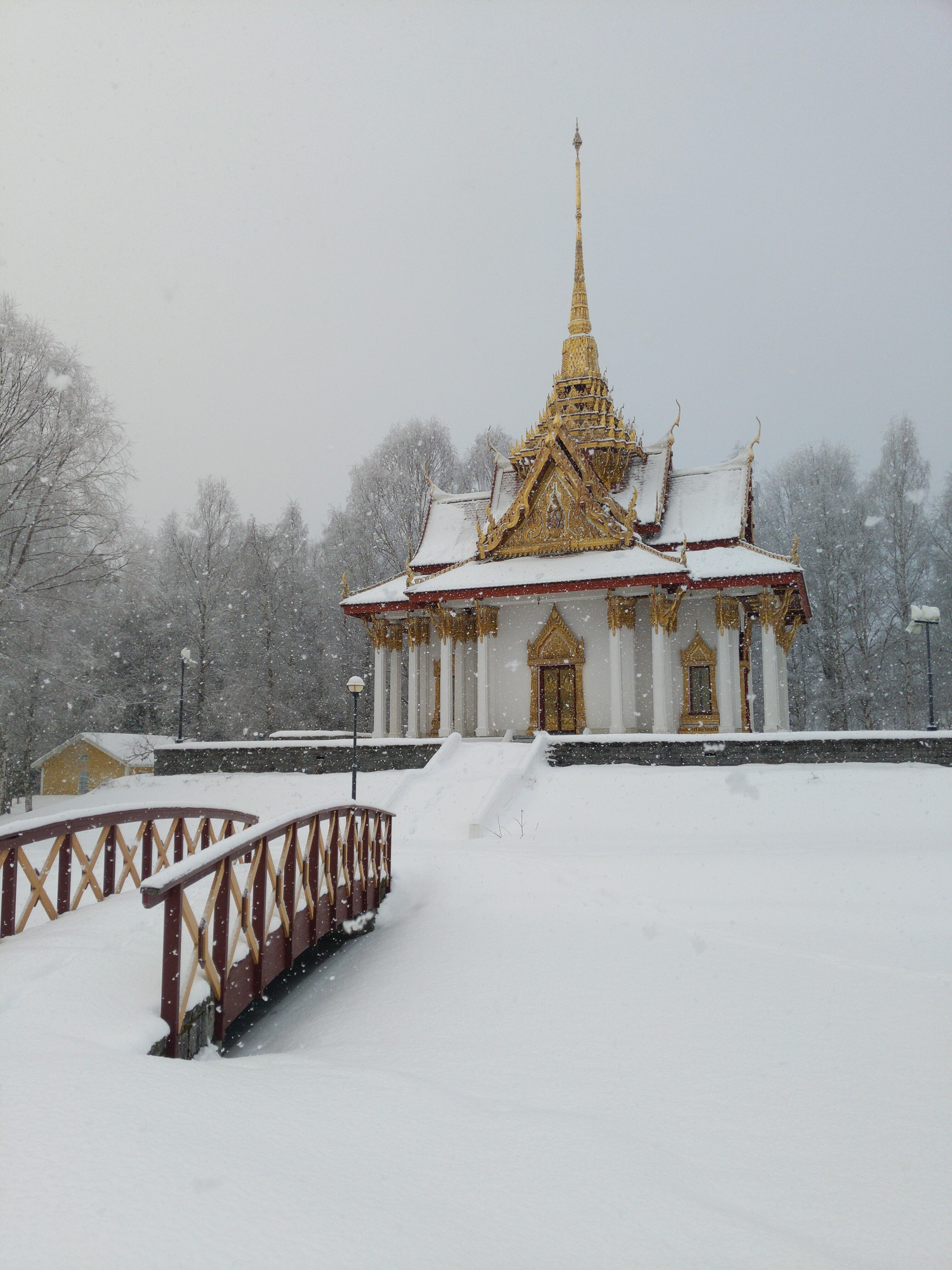
The King Chulalongkorn Memorial Building in Utanede, Sweden, during winter snowfall

In 1997, a memorial pavilion was raised in honour of King Chulalongkorn in Ragunda, Sweden. This was done to commemorate King Chulalongkorn's visit to Sweden in 1897 when he also visited the World's Fair in Brussels. During the time when Swedish–Norwegian king Oscar II travelled to Norway for a council, Chulalongkorn went up north to study forestry. Beginning in Härnösand and travelling via Sollefteå and Ragunda he mounted a boat in the small village of Utanede in order to take him back through Sundsvall to Stockholm. His passage through Utanede left a mark on the village as one street was named after the king. The pavilion is erected next to that road.

The old 100 baht banknote of Series 14, circulated from 1994 to 2004, bears the statues of Rama V and Rama VI on its reverse. In 2005, the 100 baht banknote was revised to depict King Chulalongkorn in naval uniform and, in the background, abolishing slavery. The 1,000 baht banknote of Series 16, issued in 2015, depicts the King Chulalongkorn monument, Ananda Samakhom Throne Hall, and the abolition of slavery.

Chulalongkorn was named one of twenty "Most Influential Asians of the Century" for the 20th Century by Time Asia Magazine in 1999.

Royal coat of arms of the Kingdom of Siam, introduced by King Chulalongkorn, the arms was the Emblem of Siam from 1878 to 1910.

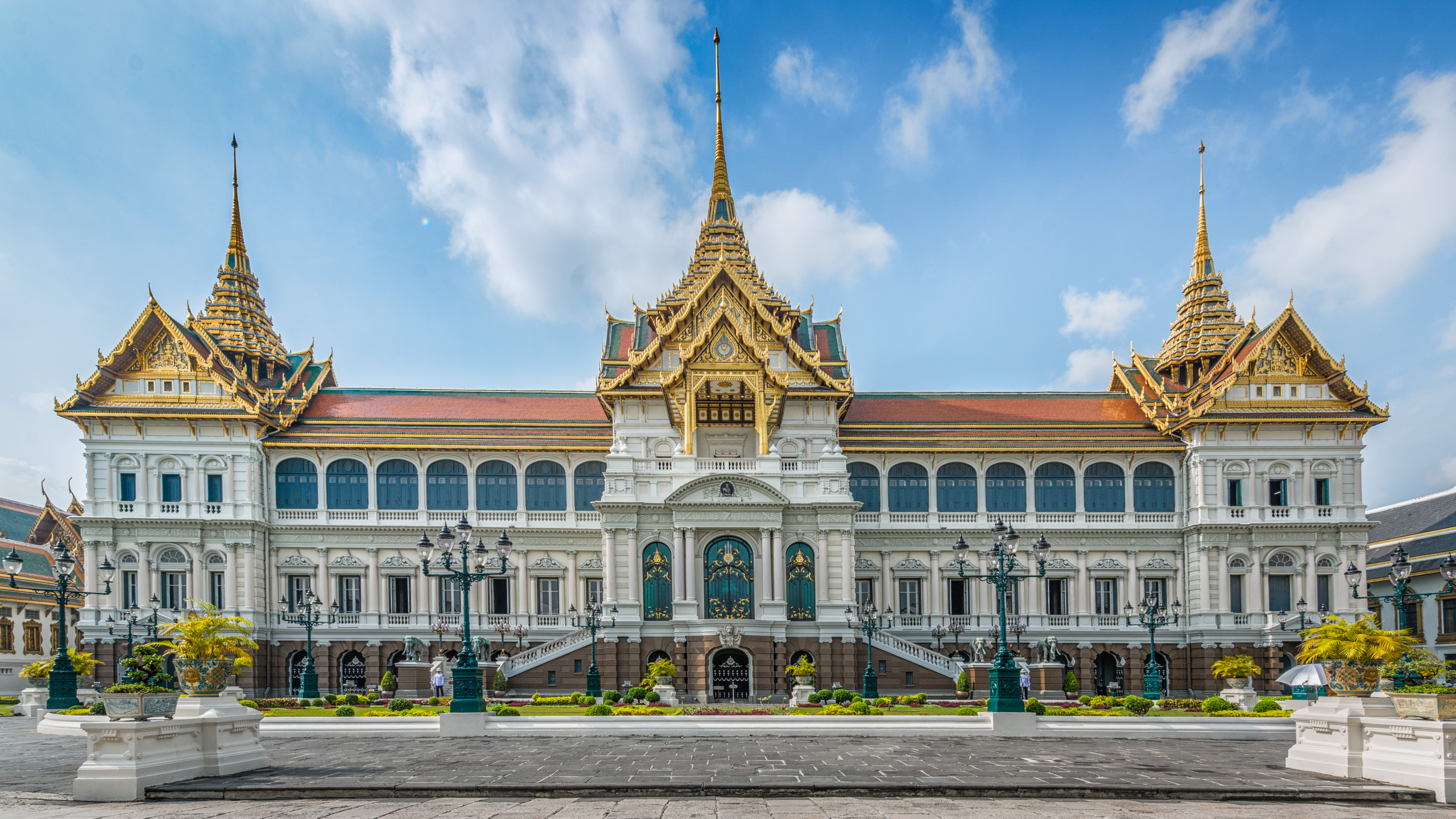
The Chakri Maha Prasat Throne Hall in the Grand Palace was completed in 1882

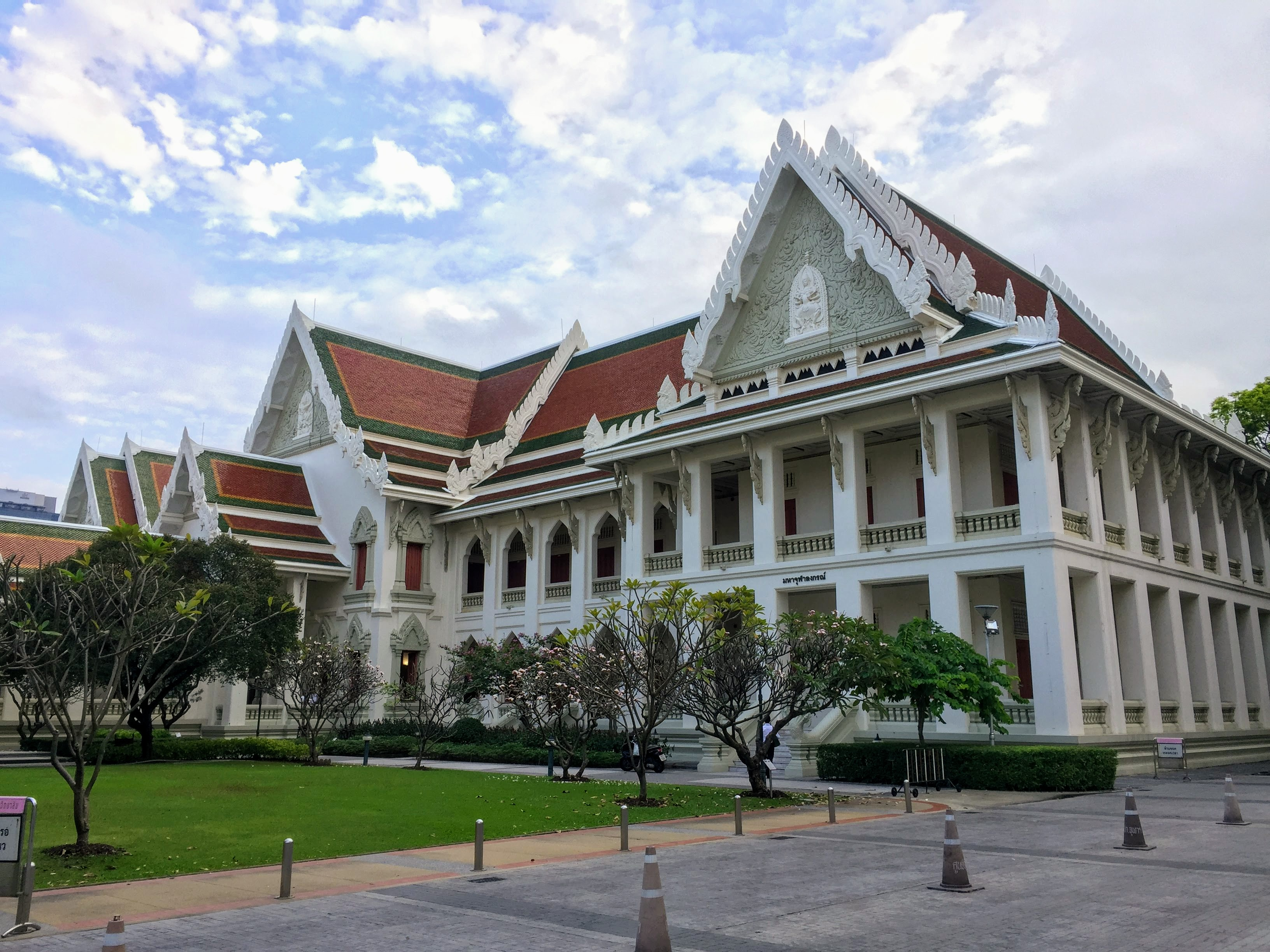
Chulalongkorn University, named after King Chulalongkorn

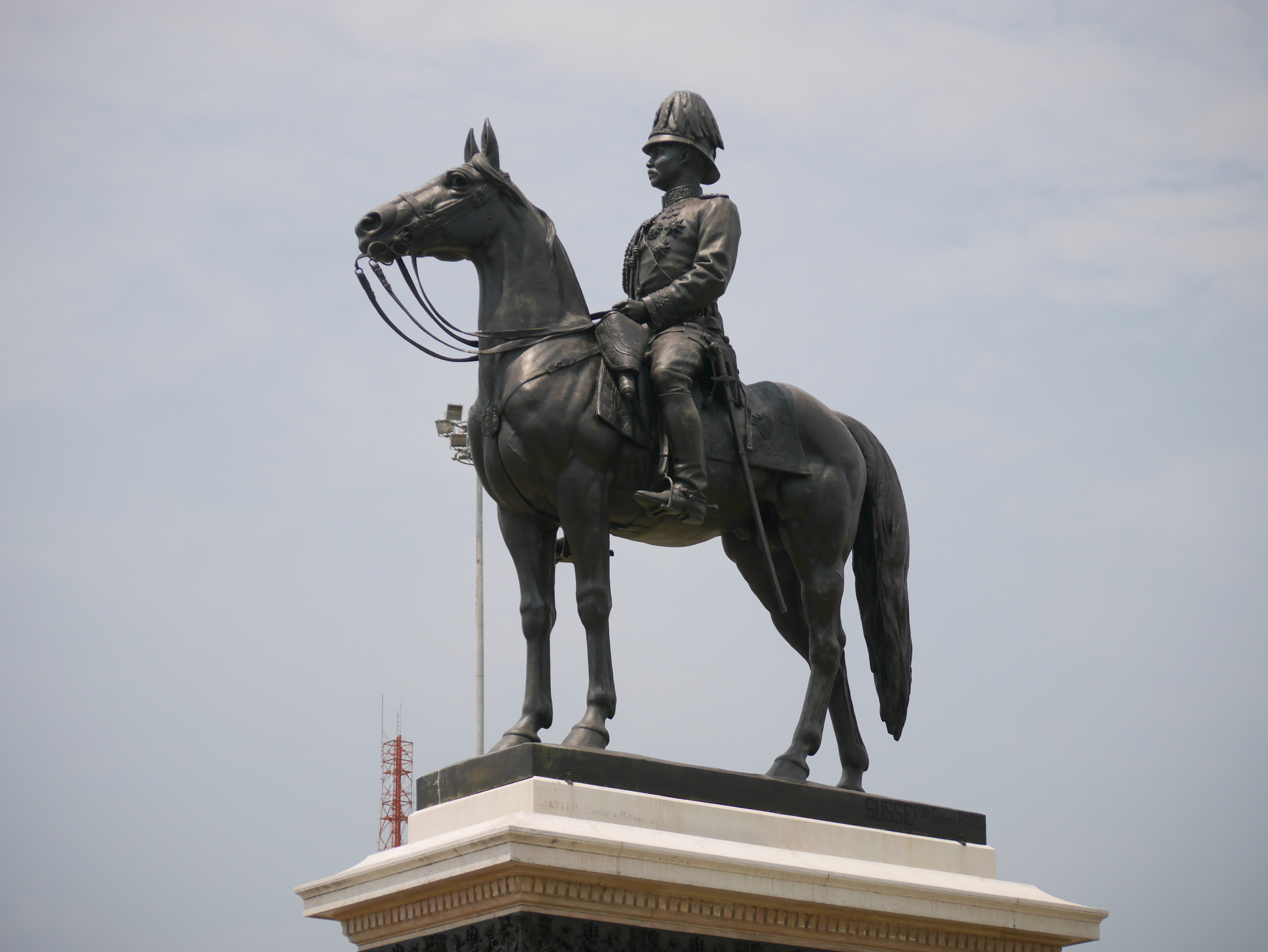
Equestrian statue of King Chulalongkorn at Royal Plaza

== Honours ==
Styles of: King Chulalongkorn; Rama V of Siam
- Reference style: His Majesty
- Spoken style: Your Majesty

Royal Monograms of King Chulalongkorn.

=== Military ranks ===
- Field Marshal of the Royal Siamese Army
- Admiral of the Fleet of the Royal Siamese Navy

=== National honours ===
- 1882 – Founder and Sovereign of the Most Illustrious Order of the Royal House of Chakri,
- 1868 – Sovereign Knight of the Ancient and Auspicious Order of the Nine Gems, with Chain
- 1900 – Founder and Sovereign of the Most Illustrious Order of Chula Chom Klao,
- 1909 – Knight Grand Cordon with Collar of the Most Exalted Order of the White Elephant
- 1869 – Knight Grand Cross with Collar of the Most Noble Order of the Crown of Thailand
- 1882 – Dushdi Mala Medal Pin of Arts and Science (Military)
- 1882 – Dushdi Mala Medal Pin the government in His Majesty (Military)
- 1882 – Chakra Mala Medal
- 1904 – King Mongkut's Royal Cypher Medal, 1st Class
- 1901 – King Chulalongkorn's Royal Cypher Medal, 1st Class
- 1897 – King Chulalongkorn's Rajaruchi Medal, 1st Class

=== Foreign honours ===
- Grand Cross of the Royal Hungarian Order of Saint Stephen, 1868 (Austria-Hungary)
- Grand Cross of the Royal and Distinguished Order of Charles III, 5 August 1871; with Collar, 16 October 1897 (Spain)
- Honorary Grand Cross of the Most Distinguished Order of St Michael and St George, 3 August 1878 (United Kingdom)
- Grand Cross of the Royal Order of Kamehameha I, 1881 (Kingdom of Hawaii)
- Grand Cross of the Royal Norwegian Order of Saint Olav, 23 November 1884 (Sweden-Norway)
- Knight of the Royal Order of the Seraphim, 11 July 1887 (Sweden-Norway)
- Grand Cordon of the Supreme Order of the Chrysanthemum, 6 October 1887 (Empire of Japan)
- Knight of the Order of the Elephant, 8 January 1892 (Denmark)
- Grand Cross of the Order of Saints Maurice and Lazarus, 1887 (Kingdom of Italy)
- Knight of the Order of St. Andrew the Apostle the First-called, 1891 (Russian Empire)
- Knight of the Supreme Order of the Most Holy Annunciation, 24 December 1891 (Kingdom of Italy)
- Grand Cross of the Sash of the Three Orders, 1897 (Kingdom of Portugal)
- Knight of the Order of the Black Eagle, 1897 (Kingdom of Prussia)
- Knight of the Order of the Rue Crown, 1897 (Kingdom of Saxony)
- Grand Cross of the Ludwig Order, 7 October 1897 (Grand Duchy of Hesse)
- Knight of the House Order of Fidelity, 1897 (Grand Duchy of Baden)
- Knight of the Order of Saint Hubert, 1906 (Kingdom of Bavaria)
- Grand Cross of the Order of Henry the Lion, 1907 (Duchy of Brunswick)

== Family ==
King Chulalongkorn was a prolific producer of children. He had 9 consorts and 143 concubines during his lifetime, siring with them 32 sons and 44 daughters. Additionally, in 1906, he adopted a Semang orphan boy named Khanung.

== In popular culture ==
- Portrayed by Tito Renaldo in the 1946 American film Anna and the King of Siam
- Portrayed by Patrick Adiarte in the 1956 American film The King and I
- Portrayed by Brian Tochi in the 1972 CBS TV series Anna and the King
- Portrayed by Keith Chin and Ramli hassan in the 1999 American film Anna and the King
- Portrayed by Aran Noisaeng and Thanachai Limsuwan in the 2004 Thai film The Siam Renaissance
- Portrayed by Sarawut Thanyalak in the 2004 Thai film The Overture
- Portrayed by Supachai polamai, Suraphat Laongmanee and Panupong Meejan in the 2010 TV Thai docudrama Thee Siamese Lord
- Portrayed by Niwes Kanthairaj in the 2012 TV Thai TV drama The Overture
- Portrayed by Wiwat Pasomsap in the 2014 CH3 TV drama Luk Thas

== Ancestry ==
Ancestors of Chulalongkorn

8. King Phutthayotfa Chulalok, Rama I of Rattanakosin
4. King Phutthaloetla Naphalai, Rama II of Rattanakosin
9. Nak Na Bangxang
2. King Mongkut, Rama IV of Siam
10. Ngoen Sae-tan
5. Princess Bunrot of Rattanakosin
11. Kaew of Rattanakosin, Princess Sri Sudarak
1. King Chulalongkorn, Rama V of Siam
12. King Nangklao, Rama III of Rattanakosin
6. Siriwongse of Rattanakosin, Prince Matyabidhak
13. Mom Luang Sab Banphluluang
3. Princess Ramphoei Siriwong of Siam
14. But
7. Noi
15. Chaem

== See also ==
- List of children of Mongkut
- List of consorts and children of Chulalongkorn
- List of people with the most children
- King Ananda Mahidol
- King Bhumibol Adulyadej

== Notes ==
Chulalongkorn (Rama V) House of Chakri Born: 20 September 1853 Died: 23 October 1910
Regnal titles
Preceded by Mongkut	King of Siam; 1 October 1868 – 23 October 1910	Succeeded by Vajiravudh
