= Ragunda Municipality =

Ragunda Municipality Ragunda kommun
- Municipality
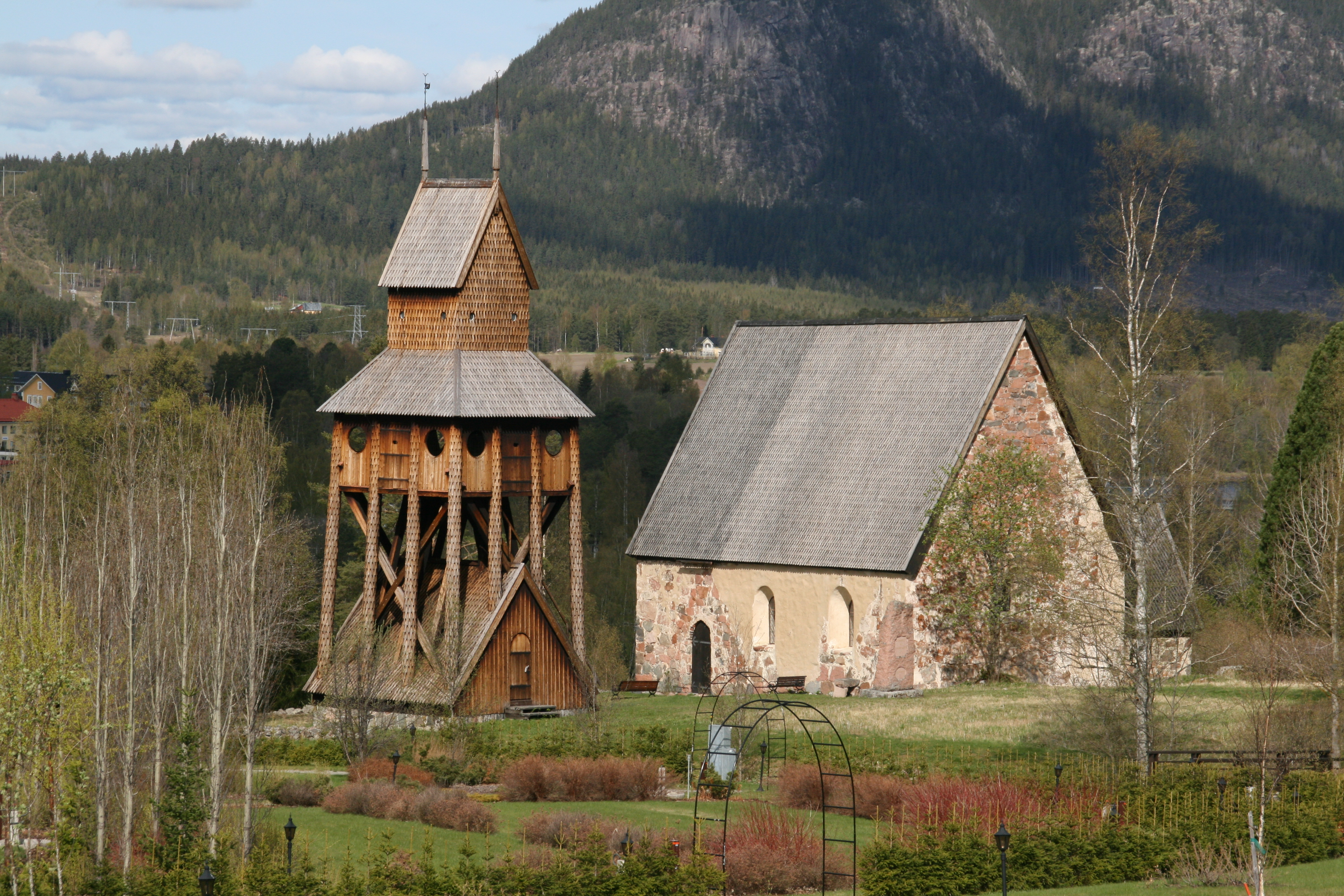
- Ragunda old church

- Coat of arms

- Coordinates: 63°06′N 16°21′E
- Country: Sweden
- County: Jämtland County
- Seat: Hammarstrand

Area
  - Total: 2,633.11 km^{2} (1,016.65 sq mi)
  - Land: 2,511.14 km^{2} (969.56 sq mi)
  - Water: 121.97 km^{2} (47.09 sq mi)
- Area as of 1 January 2014.

Population (30 June 2025)
  - Total: 5,139
  - Density: 2.046/km^{2} (5.300/sq mi)
- Time zone: UTC+1 (CET)
  - Summer (DST): UTC+2 (CEST)
- ISO 3166 code: SE
- Province: Jämtland
- Municipal code: 2303
- Website: www.ragunda.se

The Ragunda Municipality (Swedish: Ragunda kommun; [ˈrɑ̂ːˌɡɵnːda]) is a municipality in Jämtland County in northern Sweden. Its seat is in Hammarstrand.

The present municipality was formed in 1974, when the "old" Ragunda Municipality was amalgamated with the municipalities of Fors and Stugun. Further amalgamations have been discussed due to declining population but have not been carried out.

The Ragunda Municipality is known for being the site of the King Chulalongkorn Memorial Building, which is by the village Utanede. Designed as a Thai royal pavilion, the only one of its kind outside Thailand, it was raised in 1997 in commemoration of King Chulalongkorn's visit there a century earlier.

Döda fallet (transl. The dead waterfall) is an extinct whitewater rapid in a nature reserve and one of the major tourist attractions of the municipality.

== Localities ==
There are four urban areas in Sweden in the Ragunda Municipality:

#	Locality	Population
1	**Hammarstrand**	1,061
2	Stugun	627
3	Västra Bispgården	523
4	Östra Bispgården	294

The municipal seat in bold

== Demographics ==
This is a demographic table based on Ragunda Municipality's electoral districts in the 2022 Swedish general election sourced from Sveriges Television's election platform, in turn taken from Statistics Sweden's official reports.

In total, there were 5,204 residents, including 3,983 Swedish citizens of voting age. 55.2% voted for the left coalition and 43.4% for the right coalition. Indicators are in percentage points except population totals and income.

Location	Residents	Citizen adults	Left vote	Right vote	Employed	Swedish parents	Foreign heritage	Income SEK	Degree
Location			%	%					
Döviken	773	608	55.3	42.7	83	91	9	22,141	21
Fors	1,170	885	49.6	48.5	79	83	17	20,266	19
Hammaren	1,930	1,455	58.0	41.2	81	83	17	22,337	22
Stugubyn	1,331	1,035	57.4	41.2	87	93	7	23,599	26
Source: SVT

== Twin cities ==
- Karstula, Finland

== Photo gallery ==
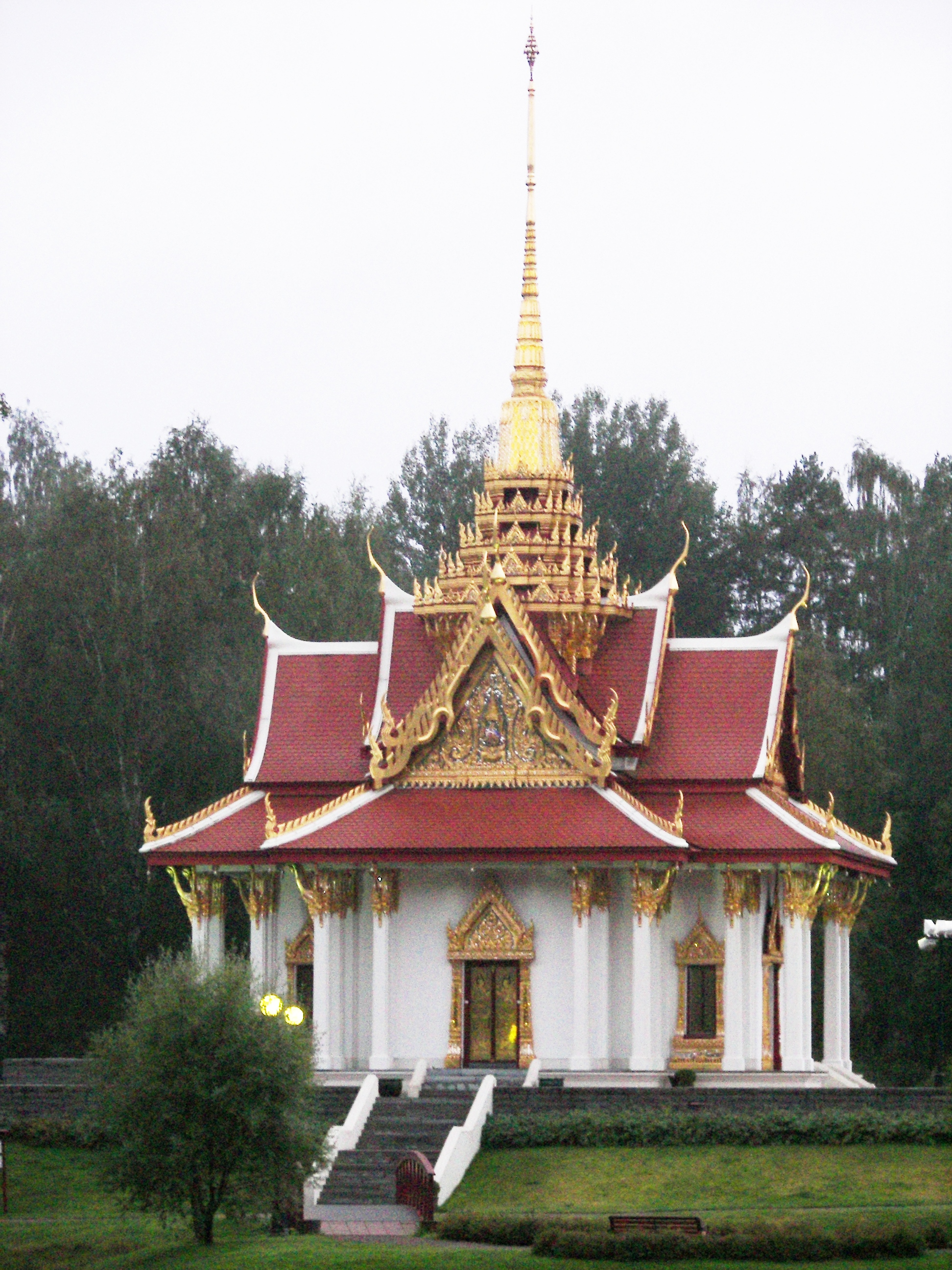
King Chulalongkorn Memorial Building

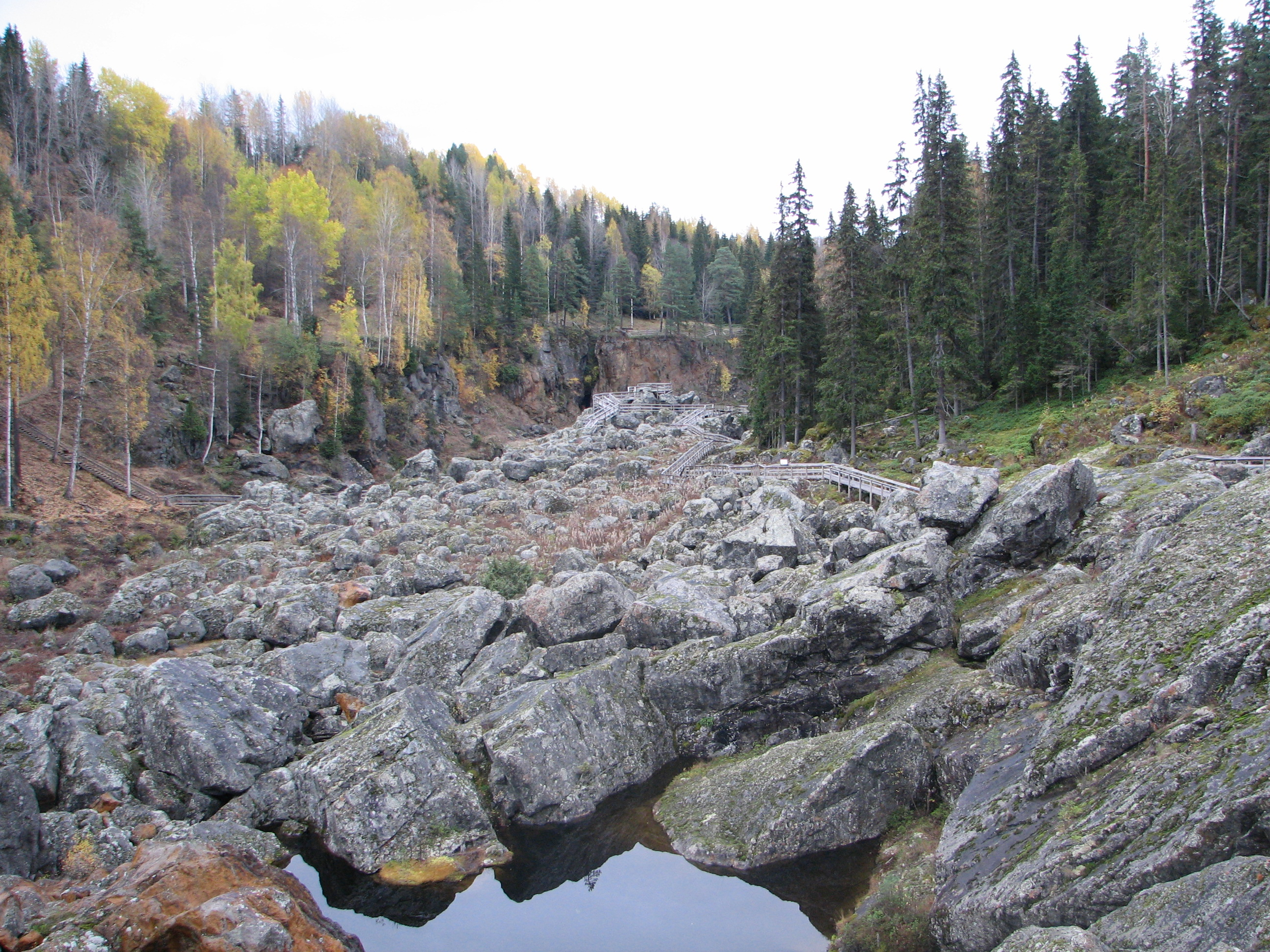
Döda Fallet

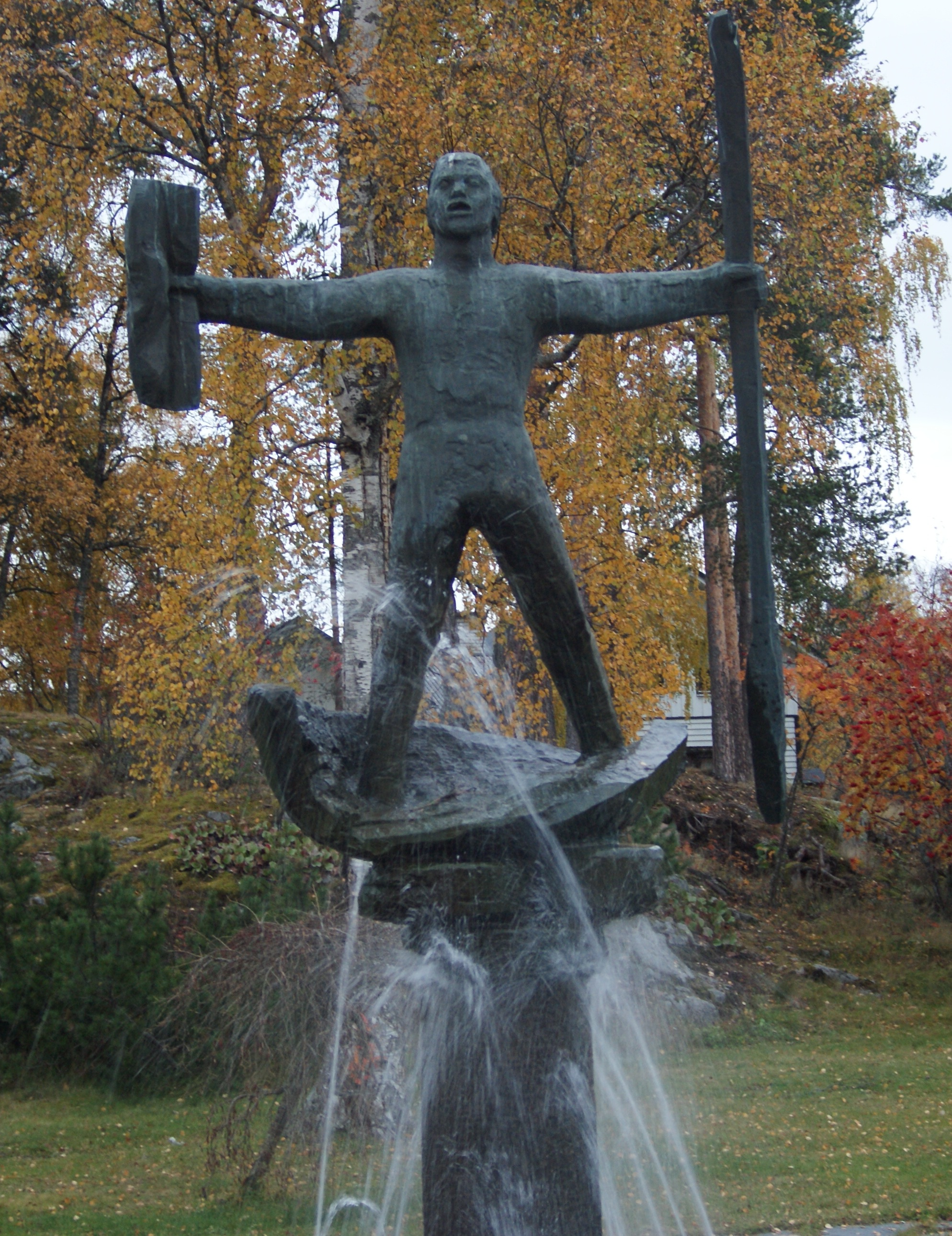
Statue of Vildhussen in Hammarstrand

== See also ==
- Borgvattnet - The Haunted Vicarage
