= April 1933 Siamese coup d'état =

First Thai coup d'état

Date	1 April 1933
Location	Siam
Result	Coup successful: Phraya Mano cabinet dissolved; Siamese Parliament suspended; Pridi Banomyong exiled, alleged of being a communist; Monarchist domination over government

Belligerents
Conservative and monarchist elites; Supported by: Monarchy of Siam	Progressive elites

Commanders and leaders
Phraya Manopakorn Nititada (Phraya Mano)	Pridi Phanomyong

The April 1933 Siamese coup d'état was an enforced change of government on 1 April 1933 by conservative and monarchist elites, led by Phraya Manopakorn Nititada (Phraya Mano), after the Draft National Economic Plan proposed by Pridi Banomyong, Khana Ratsadon's progressive leader, was deemed a communist threat by King Prajadhipok and Mano. It is considered to be the first coup in Thailand's history, followed by the first military coup two months later by Khana Ratsadon's army officer, Phraya Phahonphonphayuhasena.

== Background ==
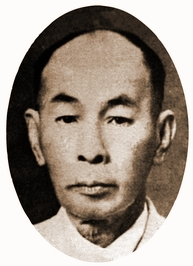
Phraya Mano, first prime minister of Siam

On 24 June 1932, Khana Ratsadon ("The People's Party") carried out a bloodless revolution against the absolute rule of King Prajadhipok (Rama VII) and drafted a new provisional constitution. The constitution stripped the king of most of his powers, and granted them to the new Government of Siam, which included the People's Assembly (the legislative branch), the People's Committee (the executive branch), and the Supreme Court (the judicial branch). The president of this new assembly would be the head of government and the de facto Prime Minister of Siam. The role was offered and accepted by the 48 year-old former Minister of Justice, Privy Councillor and Middle Temple lawyer Phraya Manopakorn Nititada. Phraya Mano was selected more probably out of pragmatism and shrewdness rather than any honourable intention.

== Prelude ==
=== Conflict between political tendencies ===
The plan drew criticism upon publication, including from newspapers, intellectuals stoked mostly by the urban elites, and landed nobility under the newly formed Khana Chart (Thai: คณะชาติ, "National Party"), seeking a way to discredit the People's Party. The criticism centred on the socialistic nature of the dossier, including charges of communism and charges that Pridi was instigating a social revolution. The criticisms were also aimed at Phraya Mano, who allowed Pridi to publish the plan. Despite these charges, the People's Party, the young revolutionaries, and most of the urban middle class and rural poor stood behind Pridi. The debate, however, escalated into a constitutional crisis when King Prajadhipok, who had confessed to the nation that he had little knowledge of financial affairs, attacked Pridi verbally and asked whether Pridi copied his plans from the Soviet Union.

The People's Committee was split between two opposing political tendencies; that of the old Thai, conservative and monarchist, led by Phraya Mano, and that of the new school, democratic and perhaps republican, led by Pridi. Phraya Mano realised the danger of Pridi's plans. On one side were the revolutionaries and members of the People's Party. On the other were civil servants and some elite members of the military, and former revolutionaries, among them Phraya Songsuradet, Phraya Ritthi Akhaney, and Phra Prasan Pithayayut. These men threatened Pridi and his supporters, stating that they would carry weapons into the assembly. When Pridi did not attend a session, they surrounded Pridi's house with armed supporters.

== Silent coup ==
Phraya Mano called for the dissolution of the People's Assembly on 1 April 1933. Under the emergency decree, some parts of the constitution, including the legislature and the judiciary, were suspended. While closing the People's Assembly, Phraya Mano stated that:

Right now, the cabinet is divided into two factions, each with different opinions. The minority faction wishes to implement an economic system that favors Communism, while the majority sees that such system would oppose Siam's traditions. It is obvious that the system would lead to a disaster among the people, as well as the nation's security... Currently, the People's Assembly is comprised of constitutionally appointed members. This assembly has a legislative duty, until the next one is elected by the people. Such assembly should not attempt to implement new economical plans that will completely replace the old ones. Many members of this assembly may claim that no such plans are being drafted, but it is clear that they intend to do so, and many of them also admire the ministers in the minority faction.

— Phraya Manopakorn Nititada, April 1, 1933

On April 2, the government issued the "Anti-Communist Act", which gave the police executive powers to arrest citizens who are considered to be communist without trial. Under this law, the People's Party was disbanded. The New York Times reported this as an act against a communist movement.

== Bibliography ==
- Lapomarede, Baron de (1934). "The Setting of the Siamese Revolution" (PDF). Pacific Affairs. 7 (3): 251–259. doi:10.2307/2750737. ISSN 0030-851X. JSTOR 2750737.
- Mektrairat, Nakarin (2010). Siamese revolution of 1932 (การปฏิวัติสยาม พ.ศ. 2475) (in Thai) (5 ed.). Samesky (ฟ้าเดียวกัน). ISBN 9786169023869.
- Stowe, Judith (1991). Siam Becomes Thailand: A Story of Intrigue. UK: C. Hurst & Co. ISBN 0-8248-1394-4.
