= Rebellion of the Sergeants =

August 1935 coup attempt in Thailand

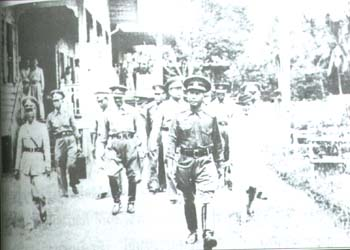
Date	3 August 1935; 91 years ago
Location	Thailand
Result	Plotters were arrested before it started

Belligerents
(Thailand) 2nd Infantry Division	Phraya Phahon Cabinet (Thailand) Royal Thai Army

Commanders and leaders
(Thailand) Sawas Mahamad	Phraya Phahon (Thailand) Plaek Phibunsongkhram

Casualties and losses
Sawas Mahamad †	

The Rebellion of the Sergeants was a military coup attempt against the government of Phraya Phahon by a group of army sergeants, led by Sawas Mahamad on 3 August 1935, but the plot was leaked. Sawas was executed and twelve plotters were sentenced from sixteen years to life imprisonment.

== Coup plot ==
In March 1935, King Prajadhipok announced his abdication while still in Europe, the new nine-year-old king Ananda Mahidol was still in Switzerland. A group of army sergeants who in charge of an armory, led by Sawas Mahamad, plotted a revolution plan against the government of Phraya Phahon. The plot started at the 2nd Infantry Division in command of Major Luang Prahanripu, located in current Ministry of Education office. They planned to kill important military officers and government officials, included Pridi Banomyong, and the regent, Prince Aditya Dibabha, to arrest Phraya Phahon and Plaek Phibunsongkhram, and to take over Ministry of Defence Headquarter. They planned to release political prisoners and force them to join the group. In the end of the plot, they would bring Prajadhipok back to the throne.

== Crushing ==
The plot leaked to the government by one of the group of sergeants. The plotters were arrested on 3 August. On 10 August, fifteen plotters were held by the government. The special secret military court conducted trials against around 100 sergeants.

The court, without a lawyer, sentenced Sawas Mahamad to death, eight to life imprisonment, three to twenty years, and one to sixteen years. Eleven accused officers pleaded guilty.

== See also ==
- Siamese revolution of 1932
- Boworadet Rebellion
- Songsuradet rebellion
