= People's Committee of Siam =

People's Committee
- 1st Council of Ministers of Siam
- 1932
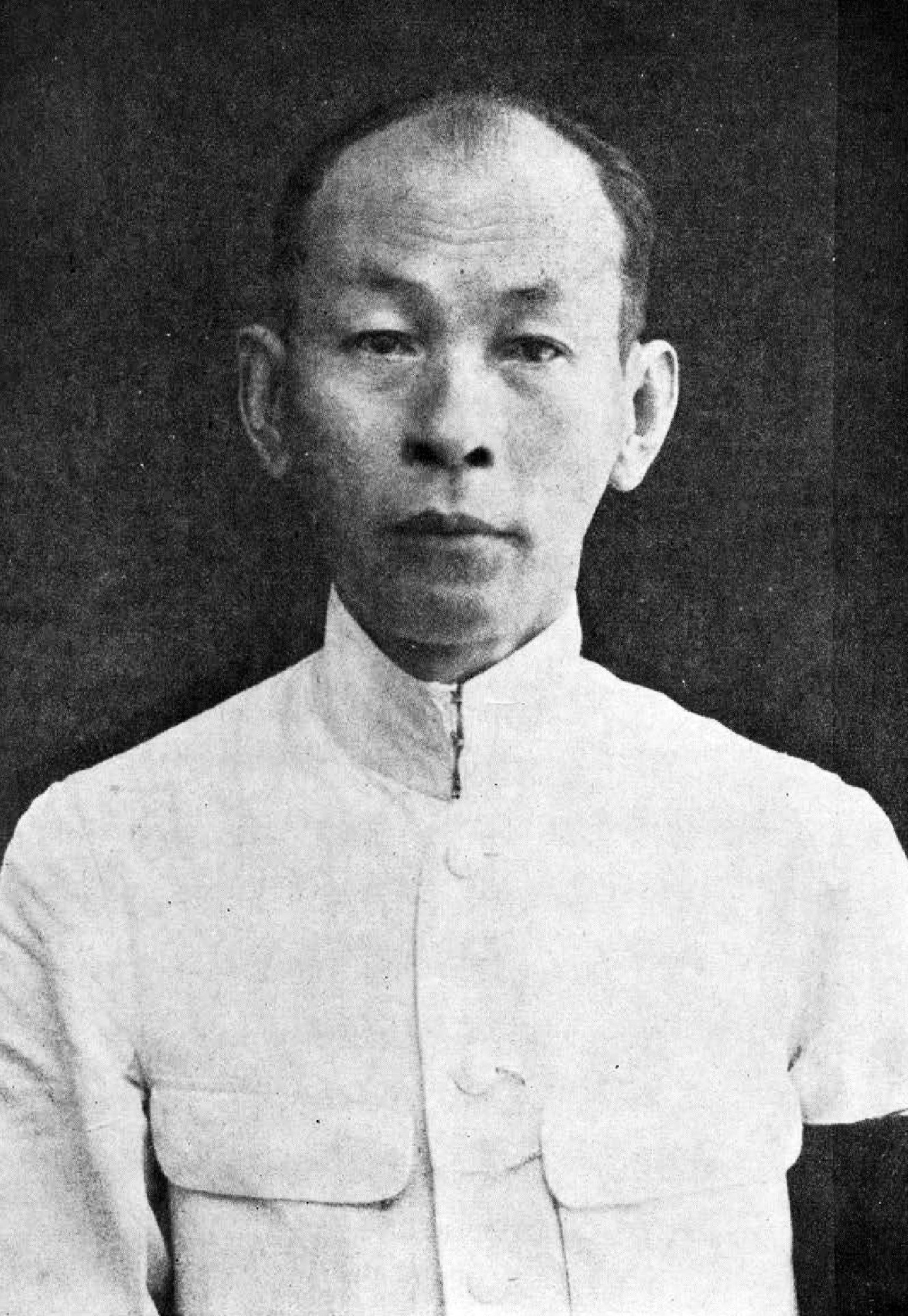
- Phraya Manopakorn Nititada the President of the People's Committee.
- Date formed: 28 June 1932
- Date dissolved: 10 December 1932

People and organisations
- Monarch: Prajadhipok
- President of the People's Committee: Phraya Manopakorn Nititada
- President of the People's Committee's history: 1932
- No. of ministers: 14
- Total no. of members: 14
- Status in legislature: Caretaker government

History
- Legislature term: Caretaker Siamese House of Representatives
- Successor: Second Manopakorn cabinet

The People's Committee of Siam, also translated as the Commissariat of the People (Thai: คณะกรรมการราษฎร), was the first constitutional Cabinet of Siam (now Thailand). After the Revolution of 1932, and promulgation of the 'Temporary' Constitution, Phraya Manopakorn Nititada (a civil servant and former Minister of Justice) was appointed the first President of the People's Committee (Thai: ประธานคณะกรรมการราษฎร) - in essence Prime Minister. However he was not allowed to appoint the members of the Cabinet as the Khana Ratsadon, the revolutionary party, has already decided to do that themselves.

Out of the fifteen members 10 are from the Khana Ratsadon; out of the 7 "Promoters" 5 are in the committee. The committee did not present any policies to the National Assembly, but decided to govern the country in accordance with the 6 Principles. The committee was active from 28 June 1932 to 10 December 1932. The committee ended with the signing and promulgation of the 'Permanent' Constitution of 1932, most members returned for the second Cabinet.

Title	Name	Party
President	Phraya Manopakorn Nititada	-
Member	Phraya Srivisaravaja	-
Member	Colonel Phraya Phahon Phonphayuhasena	Khana Ratsadon
Member	Colonel Phraya Songsuradet	Khana Ratsadon
Member	Colonel Phraya Ritthiakhaney	Khana Ratsadon
Member	Phraya Phramuanwichapul	-
Member	Phraya Phrasasphithayayut	Khana Ratsadon
Member	Major Luang Phibunsongkhram	Khana Ratsadon
Member	Lt. Commander Luang Sinthusongkhramchai	Khana Ratsadon
Member	Phraya Phramuanwichapul	-
Member	Pridi Banomyong	Khana Ratsadon
Member	M.L. Dej Snidvongs	-
Member	Tua Lapanukrom	Khana Ratsadon
Member	Prayoon Pamornmontri	Khana Ratsadon
Member	Nab Phaholyothin	Khana Ratsadon

== See also ==
- Siamese Revolution of 1932
- Khana Ratsadon
- Constitution of Thailand
- Cabinet of Thailand
- Government of Thailand
- History of Thailand (1932–1973)
