= Songsuradet rebellion =

The Songsuradet rebellion (Thai: กบฏพระยาทรงสุรเดช; RTGS: Kabot Phraya Songsuradet) also known as the Rebellion of 18 corpses (กบฏ 18 ศพ) was the claimed pretext for a political purge on 29 January 1939 by the government of Thai Prime Minister Plaek Phibunsongkhram (Phibun) against his political enemies and rivals, which named Phraya Songsuradet as the alleged leader of a plot against Phibun.

== Background ==
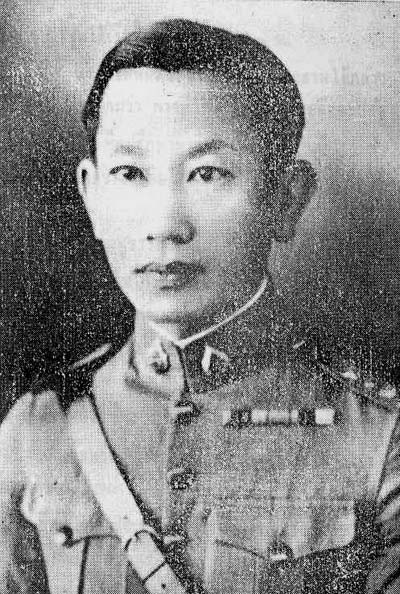
Phraya Songsuradet, the rebellion's namesake

Phraya Songsuradet was a member of the People's Party who played a crucial role in the Siamese revolution of 1932 and subsequently became an important member of the new Thai constitutional government. The roots of the conflict began during the coup d'état of June 1933, when Phraya Phahon Phonphayuhasena ousted Phraya Manopakorn Nititada and replaced him as prime minister. As with many other supporters of Phraya Mano, Songsuradet was permanently barred from politics by the new premier, spending the next two years exiled in Sri Lanka.

During, before, and after the coup, conflicts arose between Songsuradet and Phibun, who were both ministers of state and members of the People's Committee.

When Phibun succeeded Phraya Phahon as prime minister on 11 September 1938, there was much resistance to his premiership due to his dictatorial style and cronyism. This, coupled with his role in suppressing the Boworadet Rebellion, resulted in three assassination attempts, two by gunmen and one by poisoning.

== The purge ==
In 1938, Songsuradet, by then having retired from politics for five years (but not yet from the army) was commander of the military school in Chiang Mai. On 16 December he was commanding a military exercise by his students in Ratchaburi Province, west of the capital. On that date he received orders from Bangkok stripping him of his command of all units as well as his rank and titles and forcing him to retire from the army without pension. He was also expelled from the country. Fearing death, Songsuradet complied, and with his aide-de-camp, Captain Samruad Kanjonsit (สำรวจ กาญจนสิทธิ์), he escaped to Cambodia.

Actions against the "rebellion", however, did not end there. In the early hours of 29 January 1939 Phibun, with the help of his Minister of Interior and director of the Royal Thai Police, ordered the arrest of a further 51 suspects (suspected of being Songsuradet sympathizers). The persons arrested included inter alia Prince Rangsit, Prince of Chainat (a son of King Chulalongkorn), General Phraya Thephatsadin (a 62-year-old former commander of the Siamese Expeditionary Force during the First World War), and Phraya Udompong Phensawad), a former minister of state. Others arrested included politicians such as members of the People's Assembly and many were military officers and aristocrats. A further 20 suspects were arrested by the end of the day, including one of Phibun's servants.

A special tribunal was created by Phibun to try those purportedly involved in the so-called "rebellion" and the assassination attempts on Phibun. Seven were released for lack of evidence, 25 were imprisoned for life, and 21 were to be executed by firing squad.

- Lieutenant General Phraya Thephatsadin
- Lieutenant Colonel Rangsit Prayurasakdi, Prince of Chai Nat
- Colonel Luang Chamnan Yutthasilp - Former Minister
- Lieutenant Colonel Phra Suwannachit
- Lieutenant Phaopong Thephatsadin na Ayutthaya - Son of Phraya Thephatsadin
- Sergeant Major Phudphan Thephatsadin na Ayutthaya - Son of Phraya Thephatsadin
- Second Lieutenant Boonmak Rittisingha
- Captain Khun Khli Phonphrin
- Police Sergeant Major Maen Lertnavee
- Colonel Luang Mahithiyothi - Commander of the Ratchaburi Provincial Military Command
- Colonel Phra Sithi Rueangdetpol - Former Minister
- Lieutenant Saeng Wannasiri
- Major Luang Waiwitayasorn
- Police Major Khun Namnaruenat
- Captain Charas Sunthornphakdi
- Lieutenant Sai Keschinda
- Tong Changcharnkol
- Lieutenant Serm Poomthong
- Sergeant Major Phuang Phonnavee
- Lieutenant Nor-nen Talaluck - Former MP in Bangkok
- Lee Boontaa

However, three were pardoned due to their honorable records and services to the nation. The three are Prince Rangsit, Phraya Thepahatsadin, and Luang Chamnan Yutthasilp, who were instead imprisoned for life. The other 18 were incarcerated at Bang Kwang Central Prison and executed by firing squad in installments of four prisoners a day.

== Aftermath ==
Songsuradet, having escaped to Cambodia, lived the rest of his life in abject poverty, making a living by selling confectionery in the streets of Phnom Penh. He died in 1944. Many of the other suspects who were imprisoned by Phibun were eventually pardoned by Khuang Abhaiwongse when he became prime minister in 1944.

The rebellion was in effect Phibun's own version of the Night of the Long Knives. By 1938 he had consolidated his power to such an extent that he had become virtual dictator of the country, changing its name from "Siam" to "Thailand" in June 1938. He was able to accomplish this using brutal tactics and the absence of any credible opposition. King Prajadhipok had by then been succeeded by Ananda Mahidol, who was only 13 years old and studying in Switzerland. The tribunal which Phibun had set up to try the suspects was packed with judges appointed by him and his government. There were no lawyers present and no witnesses were called. Historians agree today that the men executed were mostly innocent and were not a part of a plot to kill Phibun or overthrow his government. Phibun was eventually removed in 1944. Four years later he returned and served as prime minister from 1948 to 1957. He died in 1964.

Payap Rojanavipat, one writer was arrested and imprisoned for this rebellion called the period of this event "Black Age" and he recorded his incarceration and witnessed the execution in the book of the same title.

== See also ==
- Siamese Revolution of 1932
- Siamese coup d'état of 1933
- Boworadet Rebellion
