= Thai royal and noble titles =

Thai royal and noble titles may refer to:

- Thai royal ranks and titles
- Noble titles of the Thai nobility
