= June 1933 Siamese coup d'état =

Military coup by Phraya Phahonphonphayuhasena

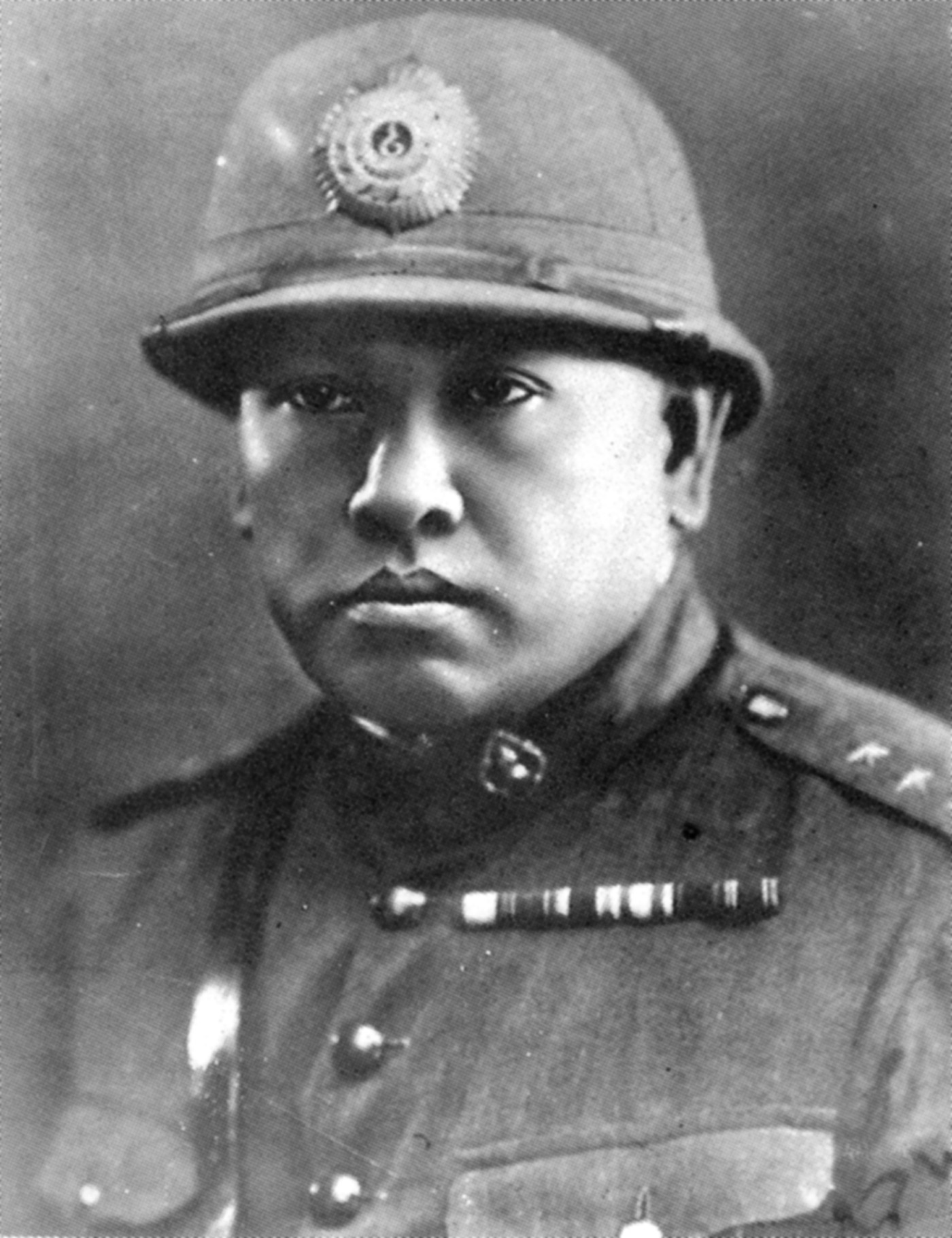
- Colonel Phraya Phahonphonphayuhasena (Phraya Phahon), leader of the coup
Date	20 June 1933
Location	Bangkok, Siam
Result	Coup successful: Phraya Phahon becomes the country's second prime minister

Belligerents
Royal Thai Armed Forces; Khana Ratsadon	Phraya Manopakorn Nitithada's cabinet

Commanders and leaders
Phraya Phahon; Luang Phibunsongkhram; Luang Suphachalasai	Phraya Manopakorn Nitithada

The Siamese coup d’état of June 1933 (Thai: รัฐประหาร 20 มิถุนายน พ.ศ. 2476) took place peacefully on 20 June 1933 in Bangkok and was led was led by Army Colonel Phraya Phahonphonphayuhasena (Phraya Phahon) against the administration of Phraya Manopakorn Nitithada (Phraya Mano). The coup was in fact a counter-coup against the dictatorial policies of Phraya Mano, stemming from his resentment of a proposal by Pridi Banomyong, the progressive leader of the Khana Ratsadon which Phahon was a member of, to reform Thailand's economy. It marked the first time in Thai history that the military successfully overthrew the constitutional government.

== Background ==
After the Siamese revolution of 1932, the first coup of Thailand's history occurred on 1 April 1933 by conservative and monarchist elites led by Phraya Manopakorn Nititada, amid national debate surrounding a nationwide economic plan proposed by Pridi Banomyong, which was deemed to be a communist threat by King Prajadhipok and Mano.

== Prelude ==
On 18 June, Phraya Phahon, a member of Pridi's Khana Ratsadon and a minister of state, resigned from his seat in the People's Committee, citing health reasons. He then took advantage of the resignation to plan an overthrow of Phraya Mano's government in secret. Phahon partnered with Luang Suphachalasai of the Navy and garnered support from the armed forces, fellow party members and Bangkok's populace for the eventual coup.

== The coup ==
On 20 June, Army chief Luang Phibunsongkhram, Navy chief Luang Supachalasai, and Phraya Phahon seized the National Assembly building and proclaimed themselves as the legitimate government. Citing the fact that the present government has acted illegally in dissolving the assembly and that they would return the constitution, which the previous administration had suspended. Phahon appointed himself the country's second prime minister and Luang Supachalasai a minister in his cabinet. He immediately recalled the People's Assembly and asked the Speaker to submit to King Prajadhipok at the Klai Kangwon Palace in Hua Hin, the reasons for the coup. The King duly accepted. He also pardoned Pridi and recalled him from exile. The coup was the first that was successfully carried out by the military against a civilian government in Thailand.

== Aftermath and legacy ==
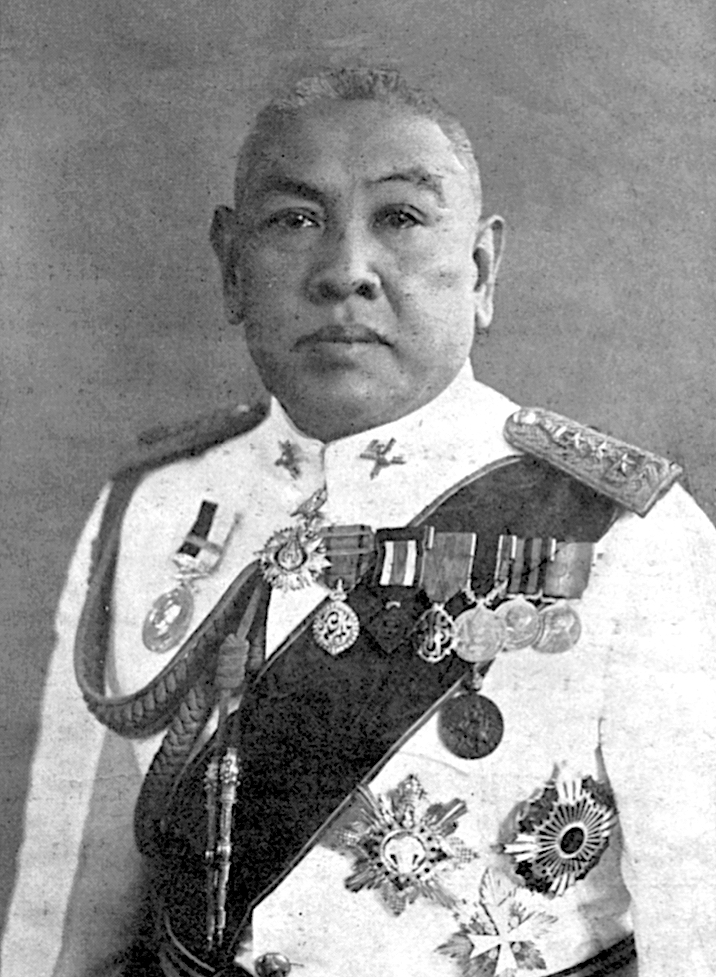
Phraya Phahon in 1940

Immediate resistance to the coup was limited and quickly dissolved. Phraya Mano escaped Bangkok by rail to Penang in British Malaya, where he died in 1948. Phraya Songsuradet and others were barred from entering politics, which would eventually lead to the Songsuradet Rebellion in 1939.

Pridi Banomyong eventually returned to Siam on 29 September 1933, but not returning to government immediately. He became an academic and founder of Thammasat University in 1934. He would eventually become one of the most important people in Thai history. During the Second World War, he became Regent of Thailand (1944–1946) and Prime Minister of Thailand in 1946.
