= Phraya Manopakorn Nitithada =

Prime Minister of Siam from 1932 to 1933

Phraya Manopakorn Nitithada ThChW PM TCh
- มโนปกรณ์นิติธาดา
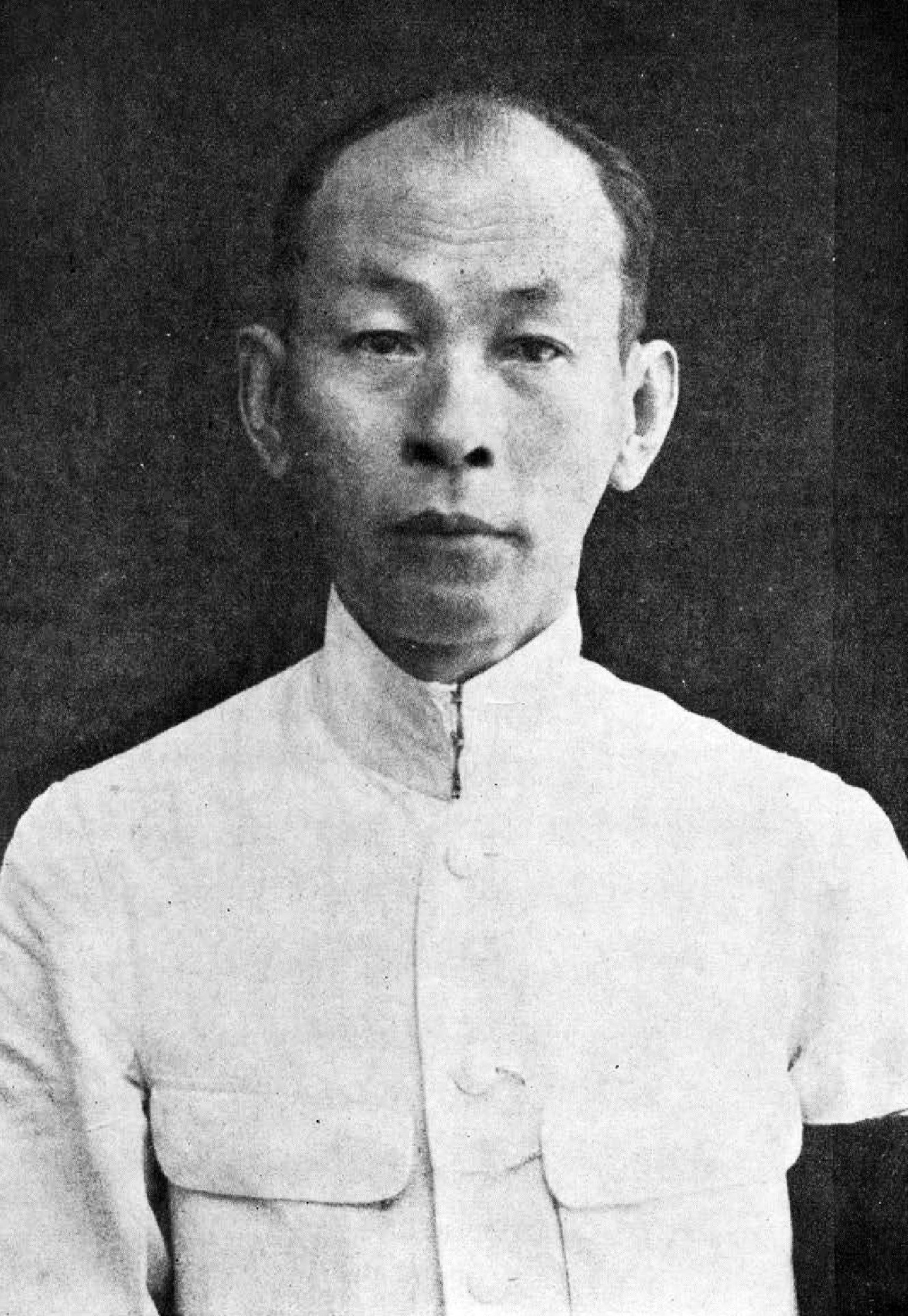
- Manopakorn in 1930

1st Prime Minister of Siam (Note: As president of the People's Committee of Siam prior to 10 December 1932.)
- In office 28 June 1932 – 20 June 1933
- Monarch: Prajadhipok
- Preceded by: Position established
- Succeeded by: Phahon Phonphayuhasena

Minister of Finance
- In office 10 December 1932 – 20 June 1933
- Prime Minister: Himself
- Preceded by: Position established; Himself (as Minister of Royal Treasury)
- Succeeded by: Chao Phraya Srithammatibet

Minister of Royal Treasury
- In office 29 June 1932 – 10 December 1932
- Monarch: Prajadhipok
- Preceded by: Prince Suphayok Kasem
- Succeeded by: Position abolished; Himself (as Minister of Finance)

Personal details
- Born: Kon (Note: At that time, Thais did not have surnames.); 15 July 1884 Bangkok, Siam
- Died: 1 October 1948 (aged 64) Penang, Malaya
- Party: Independent
- Spouses: Nit Sanasen (m. 1912; died 1930); Choei Hutasingha
- Children: 1

Phraya Manopakorn Nitithada (Thai: พระยามโนปกรณ์นิติธาดา, IPA: [pʰrá.jaː má.noː.pà.kɔːn ní.tì.tʰaː.daː]; 15 July 1884 – 1 October 1948), born Kon Hutasingha (or Hutasingh, Thai: ก้อน หุตะสิงห์, IPA: [kɔ̂ːn hù.tà.sǐŋ]) and simply known as Phraya Mano, was a Siamese nobleman who served as the first prime minister of Siam after the Siamese Revolution of 1932 as he was selected by the leader of the People's Party – the party that instigated the revolution. However, in the following year, Manoparkorn was ousted by a coup in 1933 due to the conflicts between members of People's Party.

== Early life ==
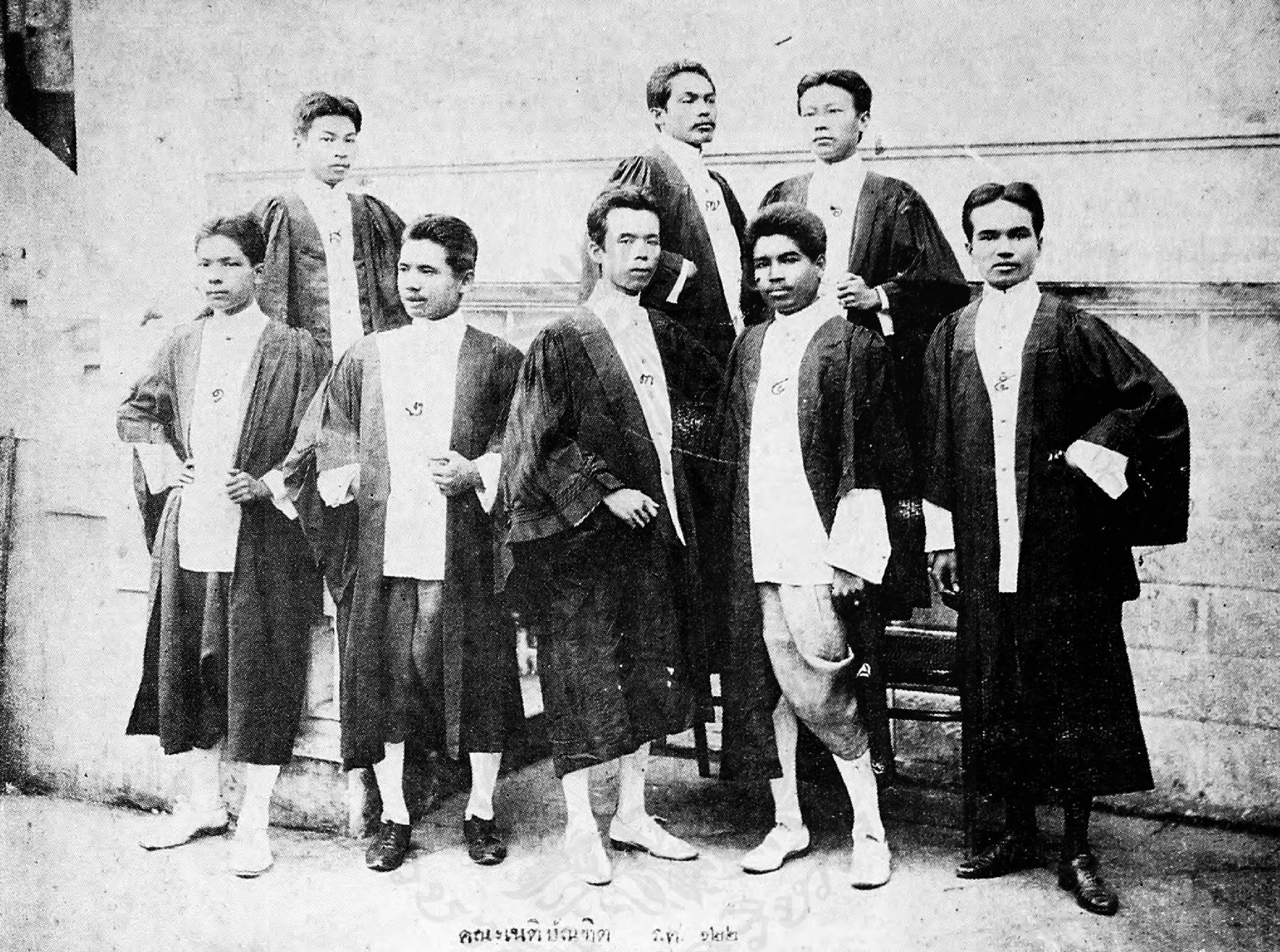
A group of Siamese barristers in 1903/04. Phraya Mano was first in the back row

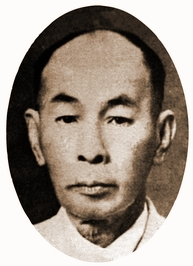
Official portrait of Phraya Manopakorn Nitithada

Kon Hutasingha was born on 15 July 1884 in Bangkok to Huad and Phaew, both of whom were of Chinese ancestry. He received his primary education at Suankularb Wittayalai School in Bangkok and pursued his law education at Assumption College and at the Law School of the Ministry of Justice. He then continued his studies abroad. It is claimed that he was a member at the Middle Temple, in London, England, but no evidence of his membership can be found in the Inn's admission registers. After he had finished his education, he began to work for the Ministry of Justice and climbed the traditional career ladder and was eventually granted the title Phraya and received his honorary name: "Manopakorn Nitithada". In 1918, he gained a seat in the Privy Council of King Vajiravudh (or Rama VI).

== Revolution and premiership ==
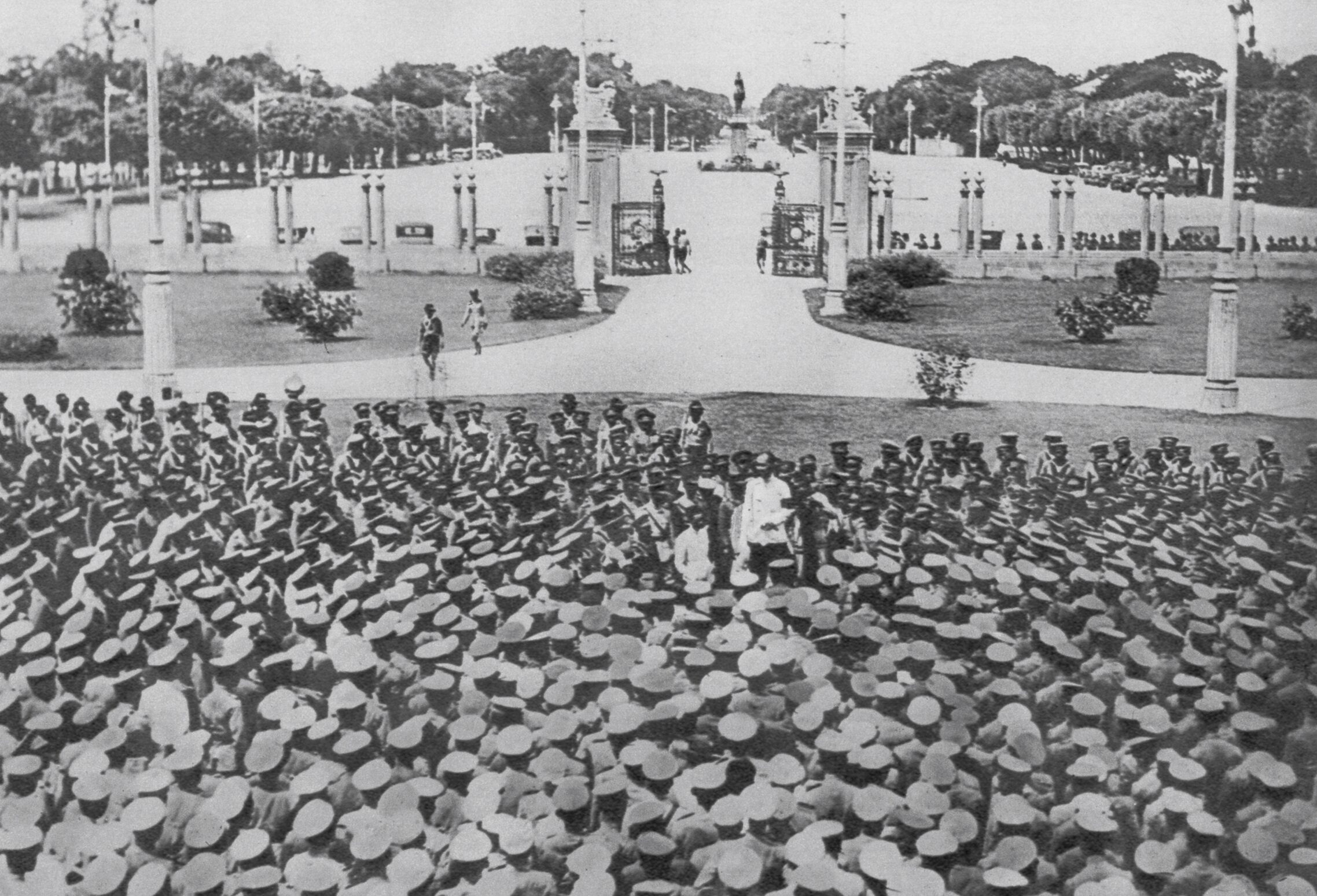
Phraya Manopakorn Nitithada addressing the crowd at Ananta Samakhom Throne Hall after the 1932 revolution

Following the Revolution of 1932, King Prajadhipok (or Rama VII) consented to a Provisional Constitution on 27 June 1932. The first People's Assembly of Siam, composed entirely of appointed members, met for the first time on 28 June. The revolutionary Khana Ratsadon Party, not wanting to appear as if it had instigated the revolution for self-aggrandizement, chose Phraya Manopakorn as president of the committee. He was considered a largely neutral and clean figure, but at the same time respected enough to take the position.

As a result, the assembly with the advice of Pridi Panomyong, one of the leaders of the Khana Ratsadon offered Manopakorn the post of "President of the People's Committee", an early version of the post of Prime Minister.

The first mission of Phraya Manopakorn's Cabinet was to draft a permanent constitution. King Prajadhipok made an observation that the term "President of the People's Committee" sounded like a communist or Republican post. After a debate, the office was eventually changed to "prime minister". The first constitution of Siam was promulgated under Phraya Manopakorn's watch on 10 December 1932, now celebrated as the Thai Constitution Day.

Soon after, Phraya Manopakorn became the head of the first constitutional government of Siam. The Manopakorn cabinet, or People's Committee, composed of members, half from the People's Party and half from senior civil servants and military officers, was appointed under the guidance of the party. Phraya Manopakorn in essence became the Khana Ratsadon's puppet, and the country a single-party state.

== Yellow Cover Dossier incident and Coup ==
In 1933, Pridi Panomyong, by then a Minister of State, presented his Draft Economic Plan or Yellow Cover Dossier to King Prajadhipok. The dossier was an economic plan, which advocated socialist solutions to the country's many financial and economic problems. Prajadhipok even branded the dossier "communist" and attacked Pridi publicly about it. When Pridi's dossier was rejected, his status fell and caused a major disruption among the members of People's Party and the People's Committee itself.

Phraya Mano rallied those who opposed the socialist plan of Pridi including Phraya Songsuradet and dissolved his own cabinet to oust Pridi, who had great support within the People's Party. To regain some stability and silence domestic critics, Phraya Manopakorn had some articles in the constitution suspended. Manopakorn barred the People's Assembly from any further meetings and the judiciary was shut down. Pridi was forced to flee to France. It was said that Manopakorn "led the coup with his pen", this event is known in Thailand as the "April 1933 Coup" (or the "Silent Coup") (Thai: รัฐประหารในประเทศไทย เมษายน พ.ศ. 2476). Phraya Manopakorn then approved the Anti-Communist Act, which empowered him to arrest those suspected of having communist sentiments: the entire Central Committee of the Communist Party of Siam was arrested and imprisoned.

After the Yellow Dossier Incident, the degree of political freedom was greatly reduced by Phraya Manopakorn's policies. He censored many leftist activities including shutting down newspapers and publications. However the People's Party, which gave him the premiership, would eventually be his downfall. On 16 June, Phraya Pahol Polpayuhasena, the country's most powerful military leader and member of the People's Party, together with three other senior officers retired from the People's Committee, for "health reasons".

== Death and legacy ==
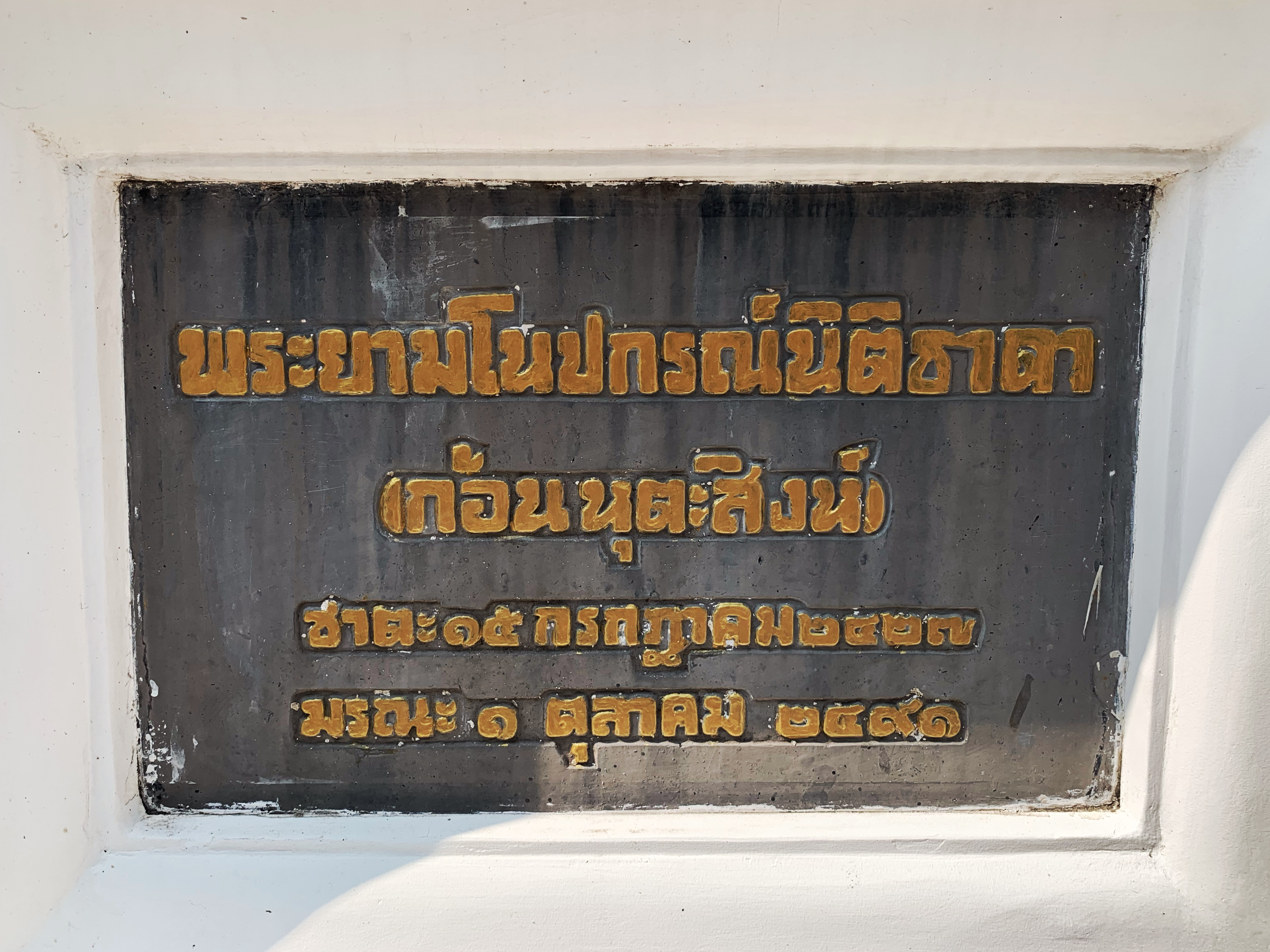
Phraya Manopakorn Nitithada's memorial in Wat Pathum Wanaram, Bangkok, Thailand

The 1933 Siamese coup d'état happened on 20 June, led by Phraya Pahol and other military leaders. Phraya Manopakorn was immediately removed as prime minister. Phraya Phahol appointed himself the country's second prime minister and took over the government. King Pradhipok duly accepted his appointment. Manopakorn was then exiled to Penang, British Malaya, and lived there until his death in 1948, aged 64.

Phraya Manopakorn was Siam's first prime minister and the first to be ousted by a coup. He would not be the last civilian prime minister to be ousted by a military coup. His legacy is mixed: on the one hand he took over the reins of government at a difficult time (Wall Street crash of 1929), but on the other he exceeded his powers and was not able to counter the powers of the Khana Ratsadon which became increasingly dictatorial.

== See also ==
- List of prime ministers of Thailand
- 1932 Siamese coup d'état
- Siamese coup d'état of 1933
- People's Committee of Siam

== Bibliography ==
- Paul Preston, Michael Partridge, Antony Best, British Documents on Foreign Affairs--Reports and Papers from the Foreign Office Confidential Print, Volume 6, University Publications of America, 1997, ISBN 1-55655-674-8

Political offices
First	President of the People's Committee of Siam; 1932	Succeeded by Himself as Prime Minister of Siam
Preceded by Prince Suphayok Kasem	Minister of Treasury; 1932	Succeeded by Himself as Minister of Finance
Preceded by Himself as President of the People's Committee of Siam	Prime Minister of Siam; 1932–1933	Succeeded by Phraya Phahonphonphayuhasena
Preceded by Himself as Minister of Treasury	Minister of Finance; 1932–1933	Succeeded by Chaophraya Srithammatibet
Government offices
First	Permanent Secretary for Commerce; 1922–1926	Succeeded by Prince Chaladlobluesan Kamalasana
