= Siamese revolution of 1932 =

Coup d'etat in Siam

- Part of the interwar period
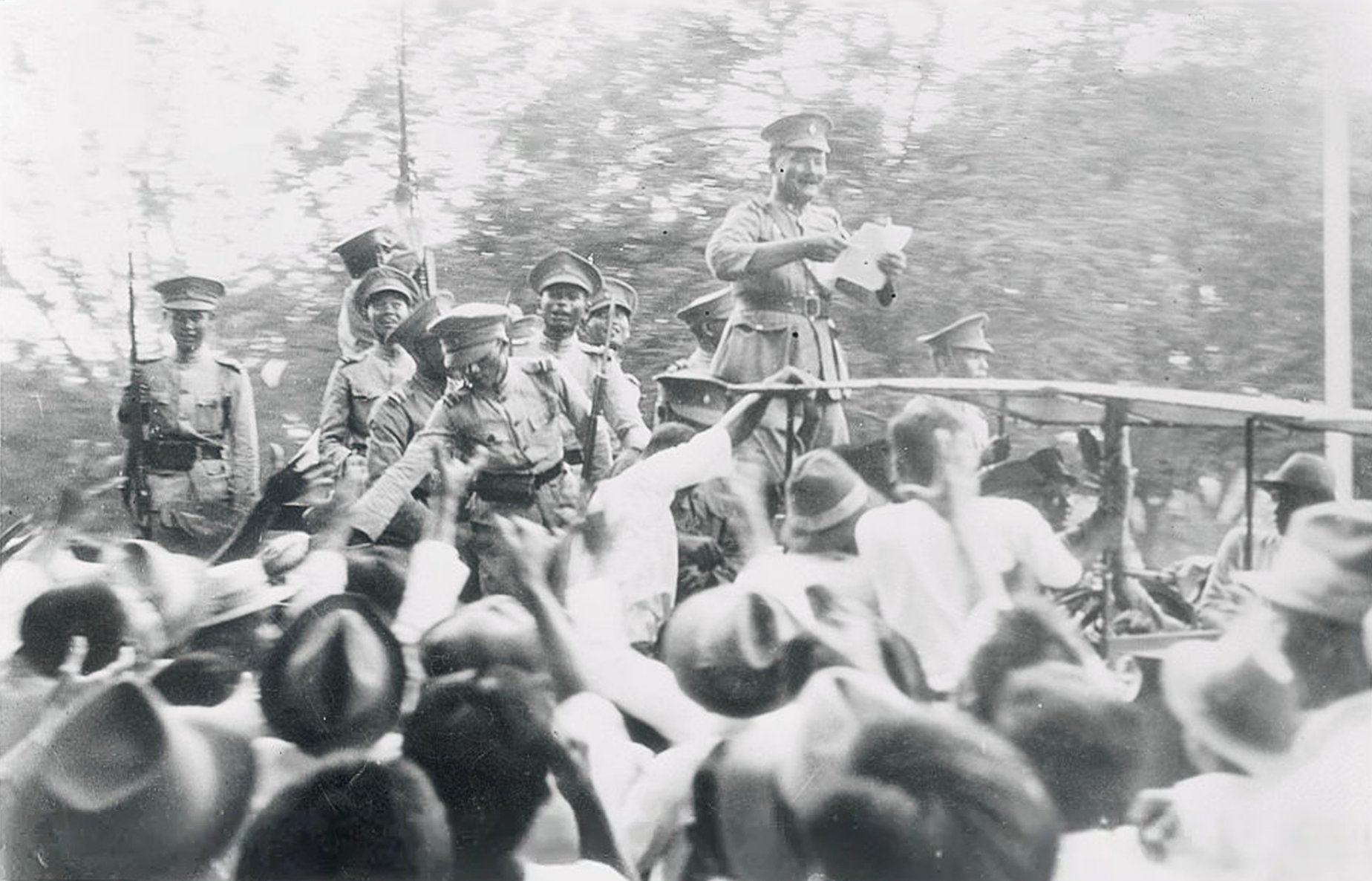
- Scene of a declaration of Siam as a democratic nation on 24 June 1932
Date	24 June 1932; 94 years ago
Location	Bangkok, Siam
Result	Coup successful: Establishment of a constitutional monarchy in Siam; End of the absolute monarchy under the Kings of Siam

Belligerents
Khana Ratsadon	Monarchy of Siam; Supreme Council of State

Commanders and leaders
Army; Phraya Phahonphonphayuhasena; Phraya Songsuradet; Phraya Ritthiakhaney; Phra Phrasasphithayayut; Luang Phibulsongkhram; Navy; Luang Sinthusongkhramchai; Civilian; Luang Praditmanutham; Prayoon Pamornmontri; Luang Kowit-aphaiwong	Prajadhipok; Paribatra Sukhumbandhu; Damrong Rajanubhab

The Khana Ratsadon staged a coup d'état in Siam on 24 June 1932. It ended Siam's centuries-long absolute monarchy rule under the Chakri dynasty and resulted in a bloodless transition of Siam into a constitutional monarchy, the introduction of democracy and the first constitution, and the creation of the National Assembly. Dissatisfaction caused by economic crisis and incompetent government, as well as the rise of Western-educated non-royals to positions of influence, fueled the revolution.

King Prajadhipok remained on the throne and compromised with Khana Ratsadon. Two coups were mounted during the following year, in April and June, amid infighting within the government over Pridi Banomyong's socialist planned economy and a rebellion of royalists.

== Background ==
=== Absolute monarchy ===
Since 1782, the Kingdom of Siam had been ruled by the Chakri dynasty. After 1868, King Chulalongkorn (Rama V) reformed a medieval kingdom into a centralising state of absolute monarchy. The monarchy started to make royal and nobility hierarchy, the Sakdina, to be the most critical aspect of Siam's political system. Towards 1880, Chulalongkorn asked of Europe an initiation into modern culture and showed a decided preference for England's Anglo-Saxon culture. In 1910s, King Vajiravudh (Rama VI) sought to legitimise absolutism through Thai nationalism, using a Western approach, by appointing more able commoners to the government. A commoner involvement disappointed the aristocracy and nobility. Rama VI carried out unpopular policies that lowered the influence of the royal family.

=== Mismanagement of Rama VI ===
During the reign of King Rama VI, the government's fiscal health was eroded. Lavish spending on the court, inability to control the corruption of the King's inner circle, and his creation of the Wild Tiger Corps to promote modern-style nationalism were widely deemed as wasteful. By 1920, fiscal mismanagement and the global economic downturn took the state budget into deficit. In 1925, the most senior princes decided to demand large cuts in expenditures, especially the royal household. This represented a bold challenge to the authority of the absolute monarch and reflected the severity of the fiscal malaise in Siam. The critique was thus that Rama VI was not a competent absolute monarch, and that he squandered the massive political capital.

In 1912, a palace revolt, plotted by young military officers, tried unsuccessfully to overthrow and replace Rama VI. Their goal was to overthrow the ancien régime and replace it with a Westernised constitutional system and to replace Rama VI with a prince more sympathetic to their beliefs. The revolt failed and the participants were imprisoned. In reaction, Vajiravudh abandoned his attempts at constitutional reform and continued with his absolutist rule, with the minor exception of appointing some able commoners to his privy council and government.

=== Rise of the Western-educated "commoner" elites ===
Western education became popular in the reign of Rama V. Although this was still largely limited to the Siamese nobility and the wealthy, new avenues of social mobility were now available to commoners and members of the lower nobility. The best example of these commoner beneficiaries is Phibun Songkram who was from a peasant background. Many of the brightest Siamese students, both commoners and the nobility, were sent abroad to study in Europe. These include Pridi Banomyong, who was of Sino-Thai descent, and Prayoon Pamornmontri, the half-German son of a junior Thai official at the Siamese legation in Berlin and later a page to the crown prince who would become Rama VI. They were to become prominent members of the "promoters". These Western-educated commoner elites were exposed not just to the latest scientific and technical knowledge in Europe, but also to the ideals of Western democracy, nationalism, and communism.

== Prelude ==
=== The "Promoters" ===
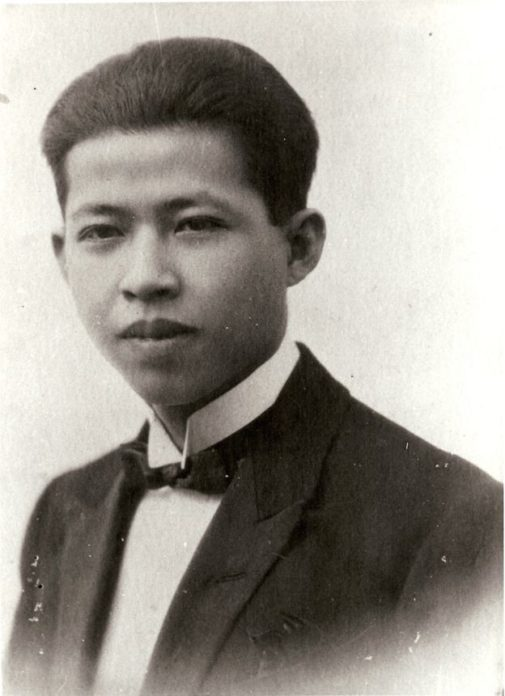
Pridi Banomyong, leader of the civilian faction

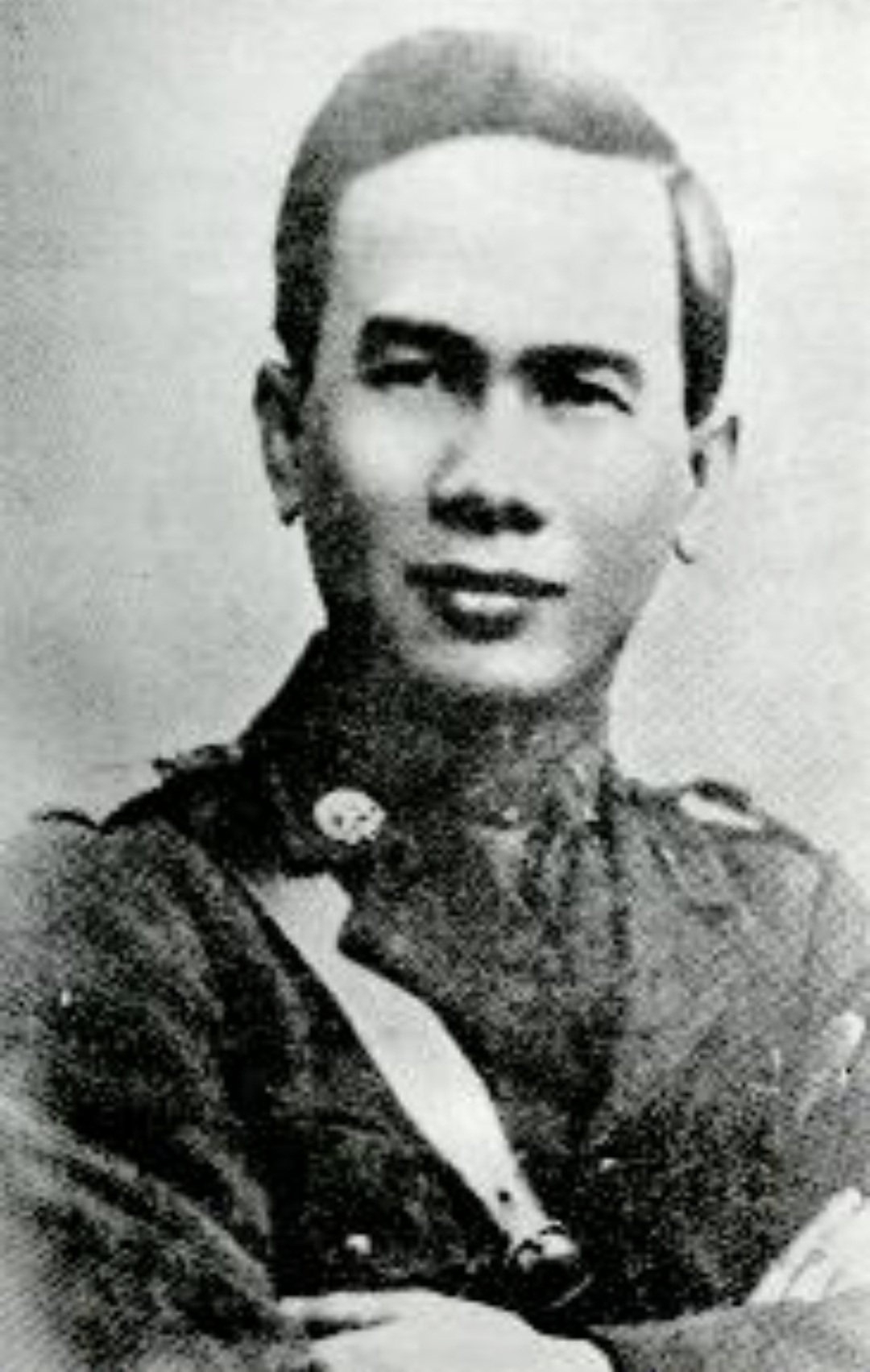
Major Plaek Phibunsongkhram, leader of the young army faction

In February 1927, in a hotel on the Rue du Sommerard in Paris, France, a small group of seven military and civilian students assembled to debate the founding of a party to try to bring change to Siam. Intent on not wanting to repeat the failure of the 1912 plot, they laid out a clear and coherent plan to change Siam. This group included two young students: one a soldier and an artilleryman Plaek Khittasangkha, the other a law student and radical Pridi Banomyong. The group called themselves the "Promoters" (ผู้ก่อการ), hoping to return home to try to promote change. The Promoters realised, ironically, as the king's advisors had done, that the Siamese people were not yet ready for democracy, and most were illiterate peasants with little concern for affairs in Bangkok. In Bangkok itself, the new and emerging middle class was dependent on the patronage of the aristocracy for jobs and positions. As a result, they realised that a "mass revolution" was not possible and only a military-led coup d'état was possible. For this purpose a vanguard party was formed and it was named the Khana Ratsadon (คณะราษฎร).

When the Promoters eventually returned to Siam by the end of the 1920s, they quietly expanded their lists of contacts and party membership, mostly using a personal relationship. Pridi became a teacher at the Ministry of Justice's Law School, where he gathered the support of about fifty like-minded men, mostly civilians and civil servants, who also wanted to see the end of absolute monarchy. It was the job of the others, such as Plaek, who had by then received the Luang title and became Luang Phibunsongkhram, to try to gather supporters within the army. A young naval captain, Luang Sinthusongkhramchai, was doing the same for the navy. The number of party members increased, and, by the end of 1931, it reached 102 members, separated into two branches consisting of civilians and the military.

=== Four Musketeers ===
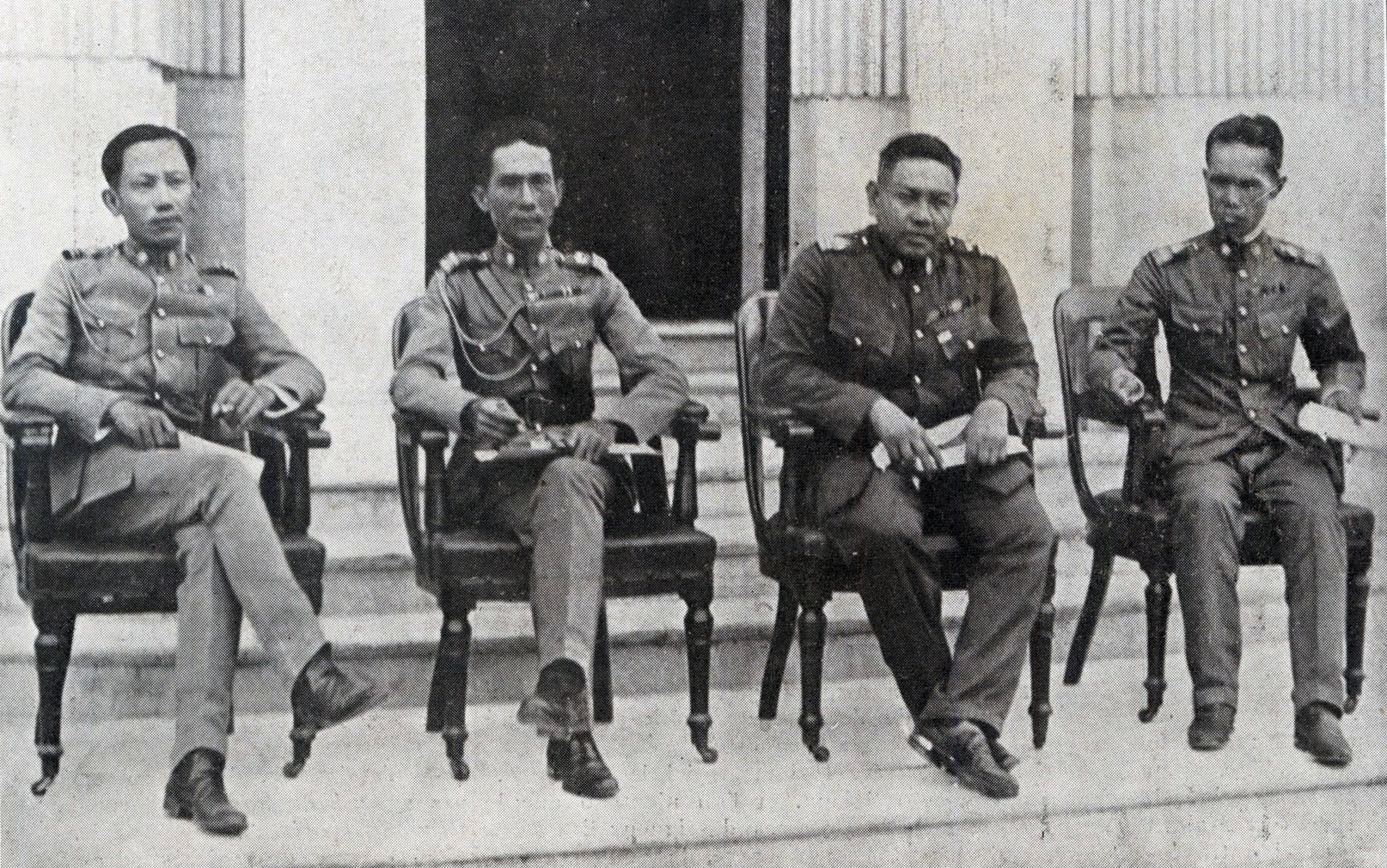
(L to R): Colonel Phraya Songsuradej, Lieutenant Colonel Phra Phrasasphithayayut, Colonel Phraya Phahonphonphayuhasena and Colonel Phraya Ritthiakhaney, the revolutionary four musketeers.

Prayoon Pamornmontri, one of the seven Promoters, himself an army officer, and former Royal Page of King Vajiravudh, took it upon himself to try to recruit for the party influential and powerful members who also wanted to see the end of absolute monarchy and power of the princes. One officer he had a connection with was the Deputy Inspector of Artillery, Colonel Phraya Phahol Pholpayuhasena. An affable man and popular within the army, he immediately joined the party and gave it his support. The second senior officer was Colonel Phraya Songsuradet, considered one of the best minds of his generation and the Director of Education at the Military Academy. Both had studied abroad and were eager for change. Songsuradet instantly became the party's tactician, advising it should first secure Bangkok militarily and eventually the country would follow. He also advised the Promoters to be more secretive to avoid official and police detection. Eventually, he approached his friend Colonel Phraya Ritthiakhaney, commander of the Bangkok Artillery, who shared his concerns about the princes' domination over the army and eventually joined the party. Finally, they were joined by Phra Phrasasphithayayut, another discontented officer. Forming what was known within the party as the "Four Musketeers" (4 ทหารเสือ, Four Tiger Soldiers), the most senior members of the party they eventually became its leaders.

=== Modernized attempt of Rama VII ===
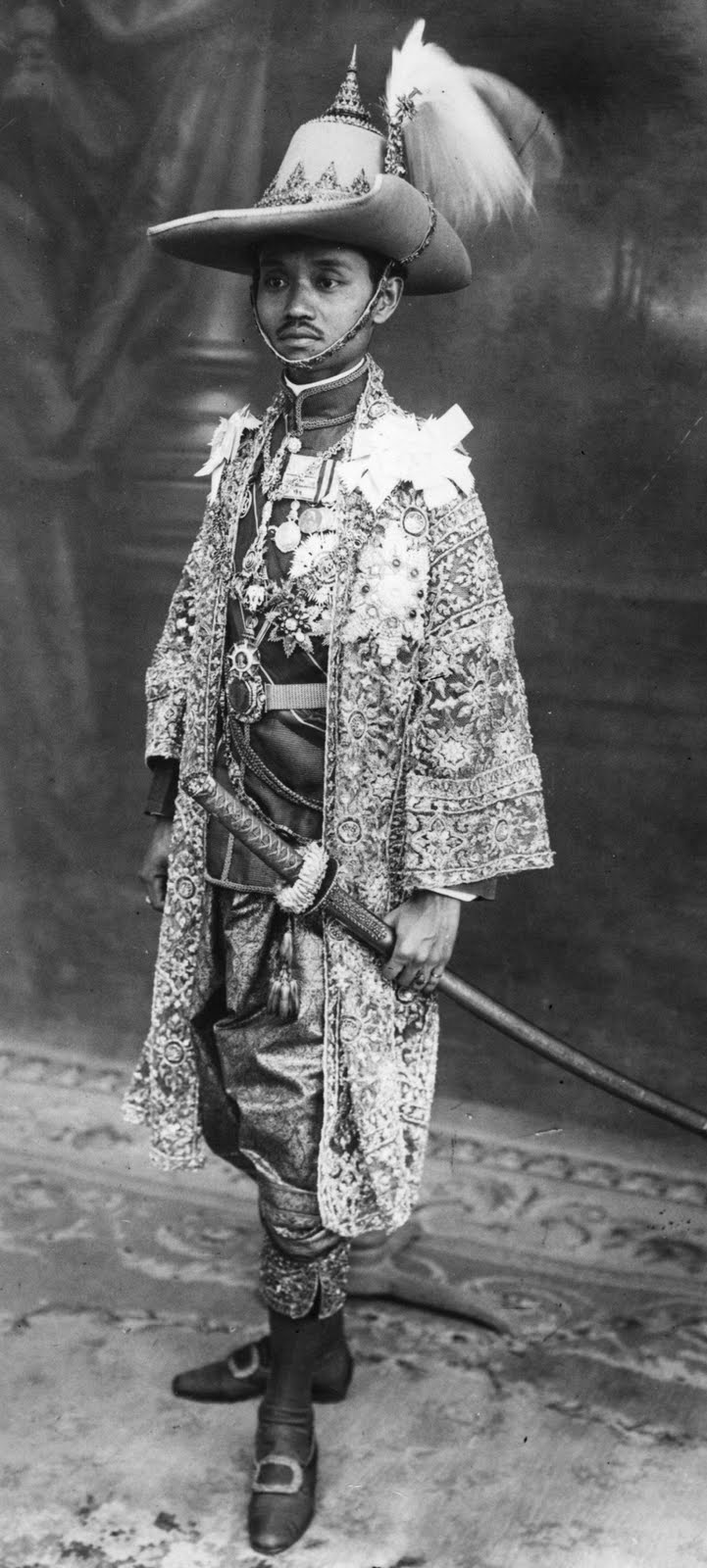
King Prajadhipok wearing khrui and chang kben, armed with krabi

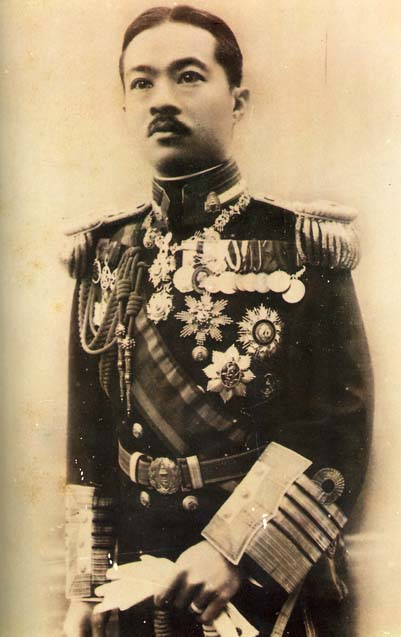
HRH Prince of Nakorn Sawan, the minister of interior and most powerful member in the government

Prince Prajadhipok Sakdidej inherited a country in crisis. His brother King Vajiravudh had left the state on the verge of bankruptcy, and the fact that the state and the people were forced to subsidise the many princes and their lavish lifestyles. Prajadhipok created the Supreme Council of State to solve the problems. The council was composed of experienced senior princes, that quickly replaced the commoners appointed by Vajiravudh. The council was dominated by the Minister of the Interior, German-educated Prince Paribatra Sukhumbandhu, high-ranking Chakri princes had regained dominance of the government, and only four of the twelve ministries were administered by commoners or members of the lower nobility. Prajadhipok turned out to be a sympathetic monarch, immediately ordered a cut in palace expenditure and travelled extensively around the country. He made himself more accessible and visible to the ever-growing Bangkok elite and middle class by carrying out many civic duties. By this time, students sent to study abroad had started to return, faced with a lack of opportunity, the entrenchment of the princes, and the comparative backwardness of the country.

=== Discontent from the economic crisis ===
In 1930, as the Wall Street Crash and the economic meltdown reached Siam. Prajadhipok proposed the levying of general income taxes and property taxes to help alleviate the sufferings of the poor. These were rejected by the Supreme Council, who feared their fortunes would be reduced. Instead, they cut civil service payrolls and reduced the military budget, angering most of the country's educated elite. The officer corps was especially disgruntled, and in 1931 Prince Boworadej, a minor member of the royal family and Minister of Defence, resigned. Boworadet was not a member of the supreme council, and it was suspected that disagreement with the council over budget cuts led to his resignation. The King, who openly confessed his own lack of financial knowledge, stating he was just a simple soldier, tried with little success to battle the senior princes over the issue.

=== Constitution denied by Rama VII ===
Meanwhile, the King put his efforts into the drafting of a constitution, with the help of two princes and an American foreign policy advisor, Raymond Bartlett Stevens. Despite being advised that his people were not yet ready for democracy, the King was undeterred and was determined to implement a constitution before his dynasty's 150th anniversary in 1932. The document was rejected by the princes in the supreme council.

On 6 April 1932, the King opened a bridge across the Chao Phraya River. The celebration was somewhat muted due to fears stemming from an alleged prophecy dating back to the days of King Rama I, which predicted the end of the dynasty on its 150th anniversary. At the end of April, Prajadhipok left Bangkok for his summer holidays, leaving Prince Paribatra in charge as regent. The King went to Klai Kangwon Palace (วังไกลกังวล: translated as 'far from worries') of Hua Hin in Prachuap Khiri Khan Province.

=== Plan leak ===
Despite their precautions, word of the plan's existence eventually leaked to the police. On the evening of 23 June 1932, the director general of the police made a call to Prince Paribatra, asking for his authorisation to arrest and imprison all involved in the plot. The prince, recognising names on the list that included many influential and powerful individuals, decided to delay the order for the next day. That same evening, one of Luang Sinthu's supporters in the navy commandeered a gunboat from its dock on the Chao Phraya River, and by morning was aiming its guns directly at Prince Paribatra's palace in Bangkok. Luang Sinthu himself mobilised 500 armed sailors ready to take the Ananta Samakhom Throne Hall, at the centre of the capital and part of Dusit Palace. Following them was Prayoon, who later that night took command of a cadre of young officers to seize the post and telegraph offices around the capital. One of the officers was Khuang Abhaiwongse. All communications between the princes and senior members of the administration were thus disabled. Their houses were also under surveillance and guarded by both civilian and military party members.

== Coup ==
=== Bangkok seizure ===
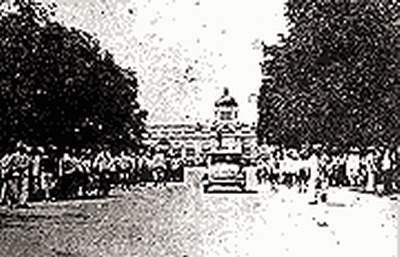
Soldiers assembled in front of the Throne Hall, 24 June 1932

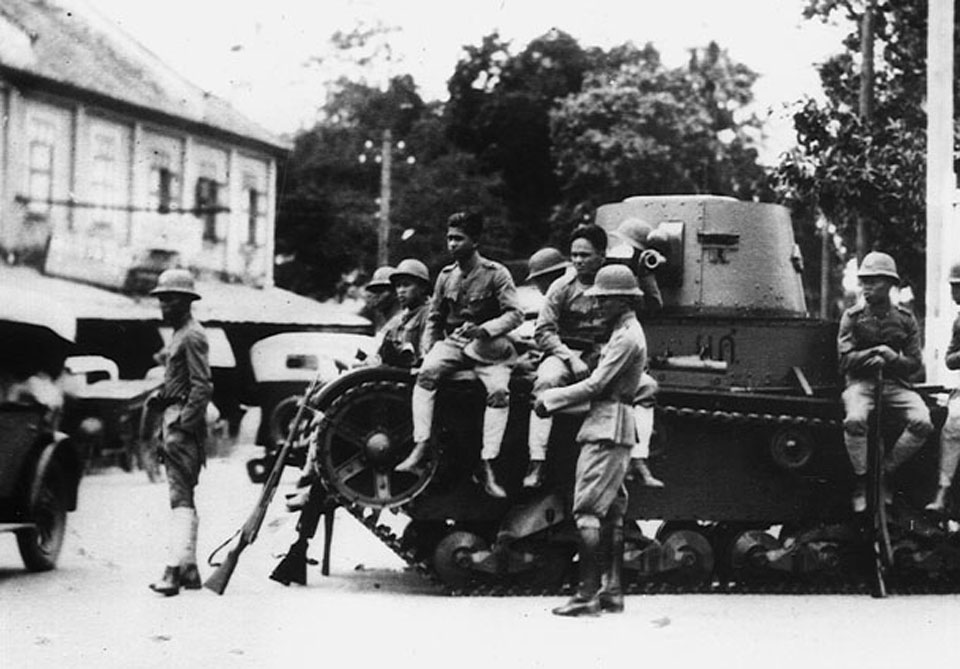
Troops on the street during the revolution.

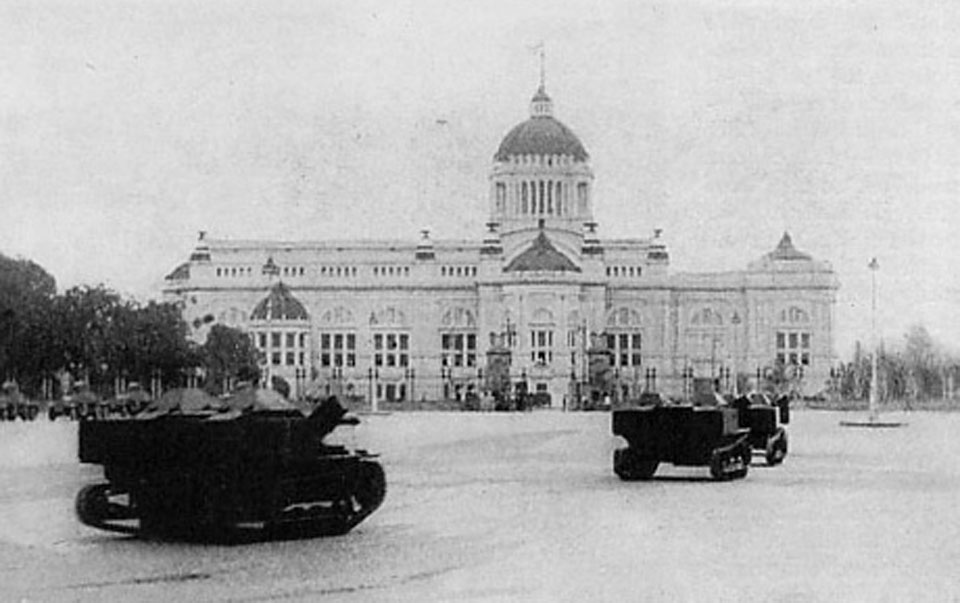
Tanks outside Ananta Samakhom Throne Hall.

While King Prajadhipok was residing out of Bangkok, at about 04:00 on the morning of 24 June 1932, Phraya Phahon, Phraya Songsuradet, and Phra Phrasasphithayayut were already carrying out their part of the plan. Phraya Phahon and some supporters gathered near the Ananta Samakhom Throne Hall waiting for the signal, while Phraya Songsuradet went with a couple of the conspirators to the barracks of the First Cavalry Regiment of the Royal Guards, where most of the armoured vehicles in Bangkok were kept. On arrival, Phraya Songsuradet reprimanded the officer in charge of the barracks for sleeping while there was a Chinese uprising taking place elsewhere in the city—all the while opening the gates of the barracks and mobilising the troops. The ruse worked, and through all the confusion and panic, Phraya Prasan was able to arrest the commander of the regiment and place him in custody. Plaek Phibunsongkhram was ordered to guard him. Armoured vehicles, including some tanks, were commandeered and ordered to head toward the Ananta Samakhom Throne Hall, including Phraya Ritthi. Having been told weeks before that a military exercise was happening, other troops in the vicinity of Bangkok joined the plotters, thus unknowingly participating in a revolution. Units loyal to the monarch shut themselves in their barracks.

By the time the infantry and cavalry arrived in the Royal Plaza in front of the Ananta Samakhom Throne Hall at about 06:00, there was already a crowd watching the assembled military. A crowd mistook the act for a Chinese uprising or a military exercise. Phraya Phahon climbed onto a tank and read the Khana Ratsadon Manifesto, a declaration proclaiming the end of the absolute monarchy and the establishment of a new constitutional state in Siam. The Promoters cheered, followed by the military, probably more out of deference than full comprehension of what has actually happened.

In truth, Phraya Phahon was bluffing. The success of the revolution still depended on events elsewhere in Bangkok. Phraya Prasan was sent to the house of Prince Paribatra, and to other high-ranking members of the government and princes. Prince Paribatra was apparently in his pajamas when he was arrested. Thirteen Thai Royal Family members and twelve nobilities were arrested, in which Thai elites were traumatically distressed. None, except the commander of the First Army Corps, offered any resistance. He put up a fight and was slightly wounded, but was eventually taken into custody, becoming the revolution's only casualty. About 40 officials were arrested and detained in the Ananta Samakhom Throne Hall. One exception was the Minister of Commerce and Communications, Prince Purachatra Jayakara, Prince of Kamphaeng Phet, who escaped in a detached railway engine to warn the King in Hua Hin. By 08:00 the operation was over and the Promoters had won the day.

The Khana Ratsadon forced the princes to sign a document proclaiming their commitment to peace and to avoidance of any bloodshed. The coup elicited almost no response from the populace, and the day-to-day life of the people returned to normal even before the end of the day. The rest of the country was also similarly disaffected, prompting The Times in London to report that the revolution merely was "a simple re-adjustment".

By the evening of 24 June, the Khana Ratsadon were confident enough to call a senior ministerial meeting. In the meeting Pridi tried to persuade senior civil servants to support the Khana Ratsadon, asking them for support and telling them to remain united, lest the semblance of confusion lead to foreign intervention. Pridi asked the foreign ministry to dispatch to all foreign missions a document stating that the party was committed to protecting foreign lives and business and to fulfilling Siam's treaty obligations.

=== Khana Ratsadon manifesto ===
Most of the military and civil administrations offered little resistance. Accustomed to taking orders and with all lines of communication shut down, they were unable to act. The next stage of the revolution was left to the civilian side of the party. Pridi Banomyong, its leader, with the help of his supporters, blanketed the capital in the Khana Ratsadon's propaganda leaflets, pamphlets, and radio broadcasts, all supporting the revolution. The text of the manifesto of the Khana Ratsadon, written by Pridi, criticised the monarch in harsh terms:

All the People,

When this king succeeded his elder brother, people at first had hoped that he would govern protectively. But… the king maintains his power above the law as before. He appoints court relatives and toadies without merit or knowledge to important positions without listening to the voice of the people. He allows officials to use the power of their office dishonestly… he elevates those of royal blood to have special rights more than the people. He governs without principle. The country's affairs are left to the mercy of fate, as can be seen from the depression of the economy and hardships… the government of the king has treated the people as slaves… it can be seen that from the taxes that are squeezed from the people, the king carries off many millions for personal use… The People's Party has no wish to snatch the throne. Hence it invites this king to retain the position. But he must be under the law of the constitution for the governing the country, and cannot do anything independently without the approval of the assembly of the people's representatives… If the king replies with a refusal or does not reply within the time set… it will be regarded as treason to the nation, and it will be necessary for the country to have a republican form of government.

The tone of the manifesto differed greatly from that of the telegram sent to the King signed by the three full colonels and musketeers: Phraya Phahon, Phraya Songsuradet, and Phraya Ritthi. The telegram stated, using royal language (Rachasap: ราชาศัพท์), that if the King did not wish to remain as a monarch under a constitution, the party was willing to replace him with another royal prince. Despite the language, the telegram warned the monarch in strong terms that if any member of the Khana Ratsadon was hurt, the princes in custody would suffer.

=== Royalty reaction ===
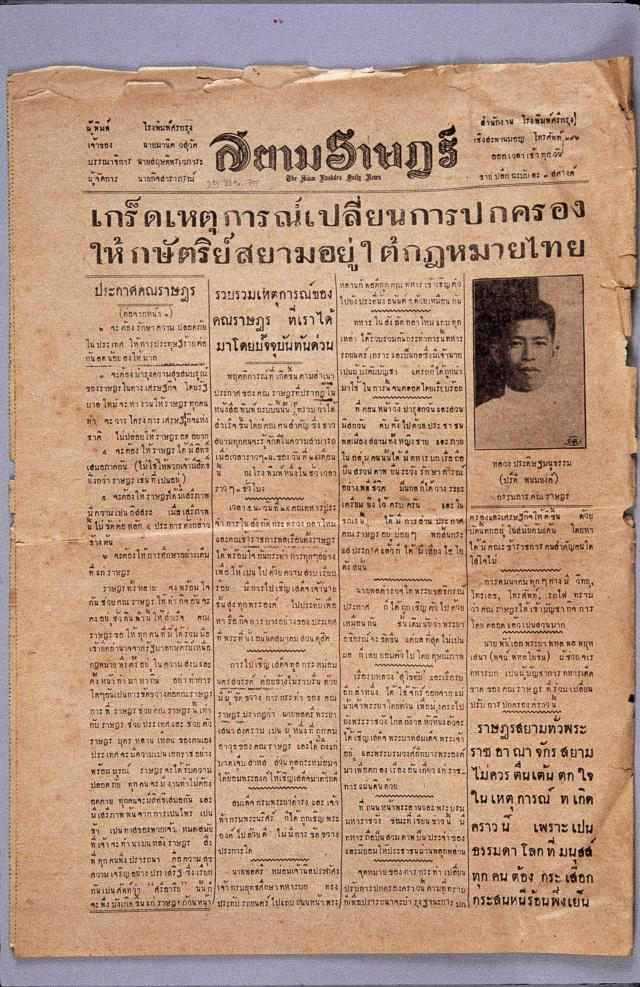
Siam Ratsadon Newspaper, the headline reads: "A change of government for Siamese King to be under law"

Before the arrival of the Musketeers' telegram, the King was aware of ongoing events in Bangkok. He was playing golf at the summer villa's course with the queen, two princely ministers, and some courtiers. When an urgent message arrived, reportedly at the eighth hole, Prince Purachatra arrived to report to the King. The King and the princes discussed many options, which included fleeing the country, staging a counter-coup or full surrender. However, the King had already decided before the telegram arrived. He quickly replied he was willing to remain on the throne as a constitutional monarch and that he had always favoured granting the people a constitution. The King wrote of his decision of refusing to fight, "I could not sit on a throne besmirched by blood." One point which the King did not concede was when the party sent a gunboat to carry him to Bangkok. He refused and travelled back to Bangkok by royal train, stating that he was not a captive of the Khana Ratsadon.

King Prajadhipok returned to Bangkok on 26 June. His first action was to grant a royal audience to the Khana Ratsadon. As the members entered the room, the King rose and greeted them by saying: "I rise in honour of the Khana Ratsadon". It was a significant gesture, as in Siamese culture the king always remains seated when their subjects offer homage, not the reverse. This led to Pridi apologising for defaming him in the manifesto. Subsequently, all known copies were pulled from circulation. The King responded to this act by affixing his royal seal on a document exonerating all members of the Khana Ratsadon for the coup. The Khana Ratsadon then released all their hostages with the exception of Prince Paribatra, whom they considered too powerful. They asked him to leave the country instead. He later left for Java, never to return, and died in Bandung in 1944. Other princes went into voluntary exile in other Southeast Asian countries, and some others in Europe.

The coup took place in an era when most of the population was kept out of politics and the political sphere was the domain of military and bureaucratic elites. Handley suggests that the refusal of both Rama VI and VII, and aristocracy to share power with the new "commoner" elites, forced the "commoner" elites and some high-ranking nobility to support the Promoters' bid to seize power through military force. The resulting unhappiness at the status quo due to the awareness of the ideals of Western democracy, nationalism, and communism, coupled with the mismanagement by the absolute monarchy and the deteriorating economic conditions caused by the Great Depression, triggered the 1932 revolution. The onus of the outbreak of the 1932 revolution from this perspective thus lies with the disgruntled commoner elites. who wanted radical change and were generally unwilling to compromise with the monarchy and the aristocracy, in particular with Rama VII, who was supposedly in favour of a constitutional monarchy.

=== First constitution of Thailand ===
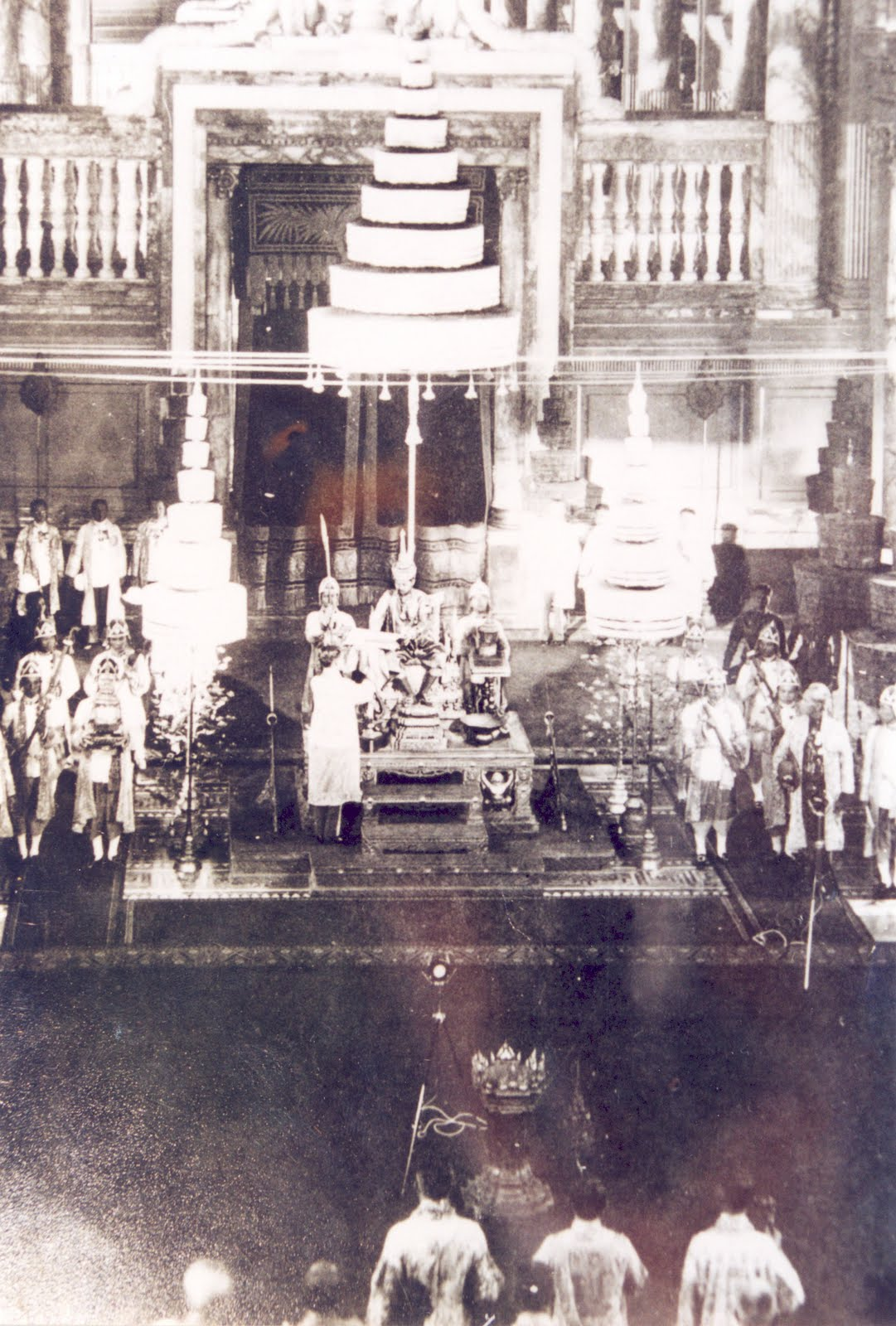
The granting of Siam's 'permanent' constitution on 10 December 1932 at the Ananta Samakhom Throne Hall

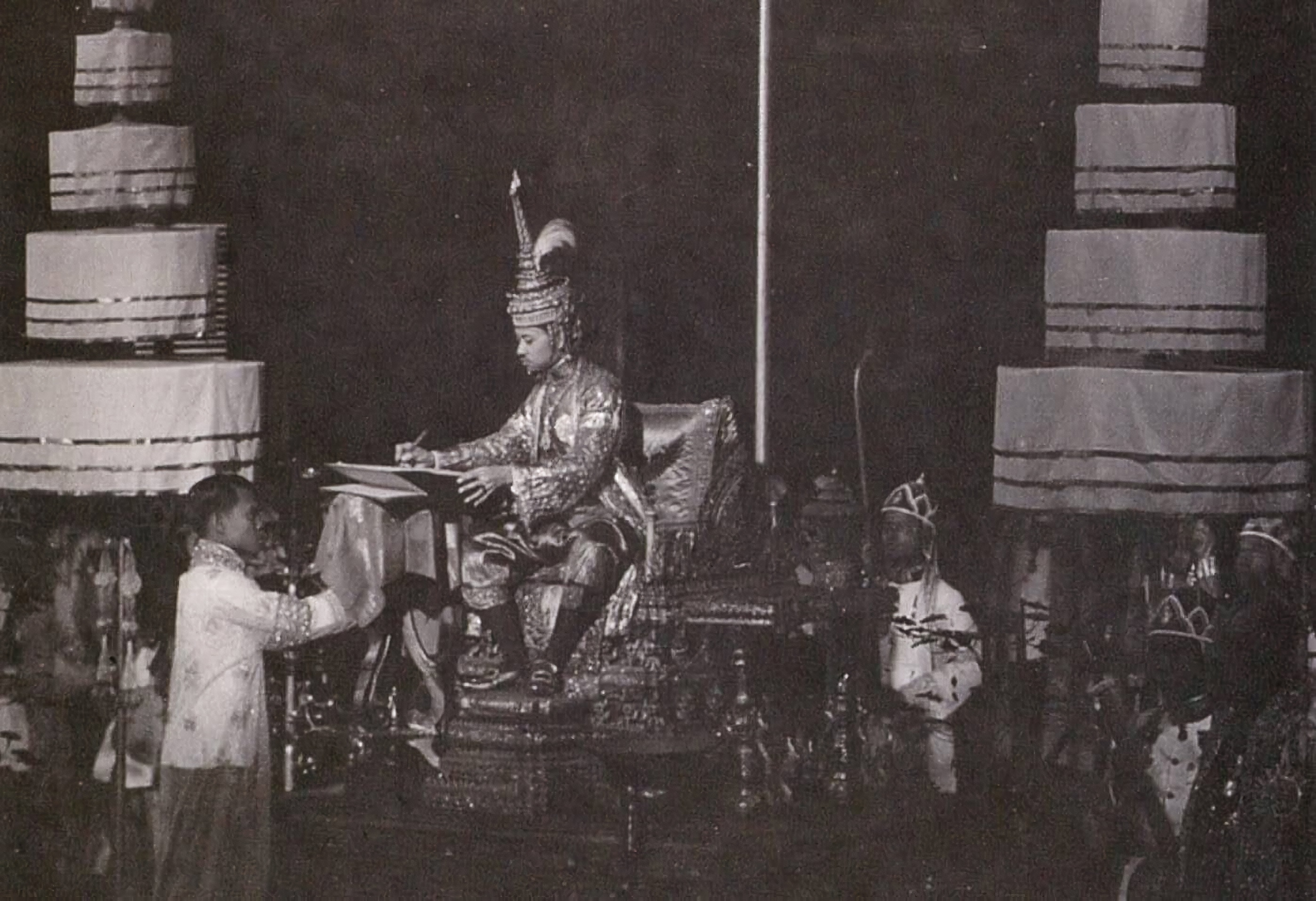
King Prajadhipok signing the Permanent Constitution of Siam on 10 December 1932

In the immediate aftermath of the revolution, Prajadhipok and the Khana Ratsadon immediately set about granting the Siamese people their first constitution. The temporary charter was signed on 27 June 1932 at 17:00. It was a draft document written by Pridi in advance. The constitution began by announcing that: "the highest power in the land belongs to all people." The constitution basically stripped the king of all of his ancient powers such as his power of veto, power of pardon, and the right to even confirm his own successor and heir. The constitution removed the monarchy's powers, without abolishing the office itself. The constitution created a People's Committee (คณะกรรมการราษฎร, the executive) and an Assembly of People's Representatives (รัฐสภาผู้แทนราษฎร) made up of 70 appointed members.

"Democracy" for Siam was to be given to the people in three installments. First, assembly members were to be appointed by the Four Musketeers. They would exercise power on behalf of the people, and their first session was to last six months. Second, a period when the mostly ignorant populace would learn about democracy and elections; the assembly would then be changed to be composed of half-appointed members by the Musketeers, and the other half through indirect representation. These candidates must, of course, have been examined by the Khana Ratsadon before any election. Third, the charter stated that full democratic representation in the assembly could only be achieved at the end of ten years or when more than half of the populace had gone through primary education, whichever was achieved first.

The first session of the People's Assembly convened in the Ananta Samakhom Throne Hall on 28 June 1932. The charter however did not last long. By the end of the year a new more moderate permanent constitution would be signed, on 10 December. This constitution eventually gave back to the monarchy many powers it had lost in the previous charter, and the monarchy was once again held "sacred and inviolable". The Assembly of People's Representatives was expanded to include 156 members, 78 elected and 78 appointed. The democratic restrictions were removed and the government scheduled Siam's first election in October 1933.

== Aftermath ==
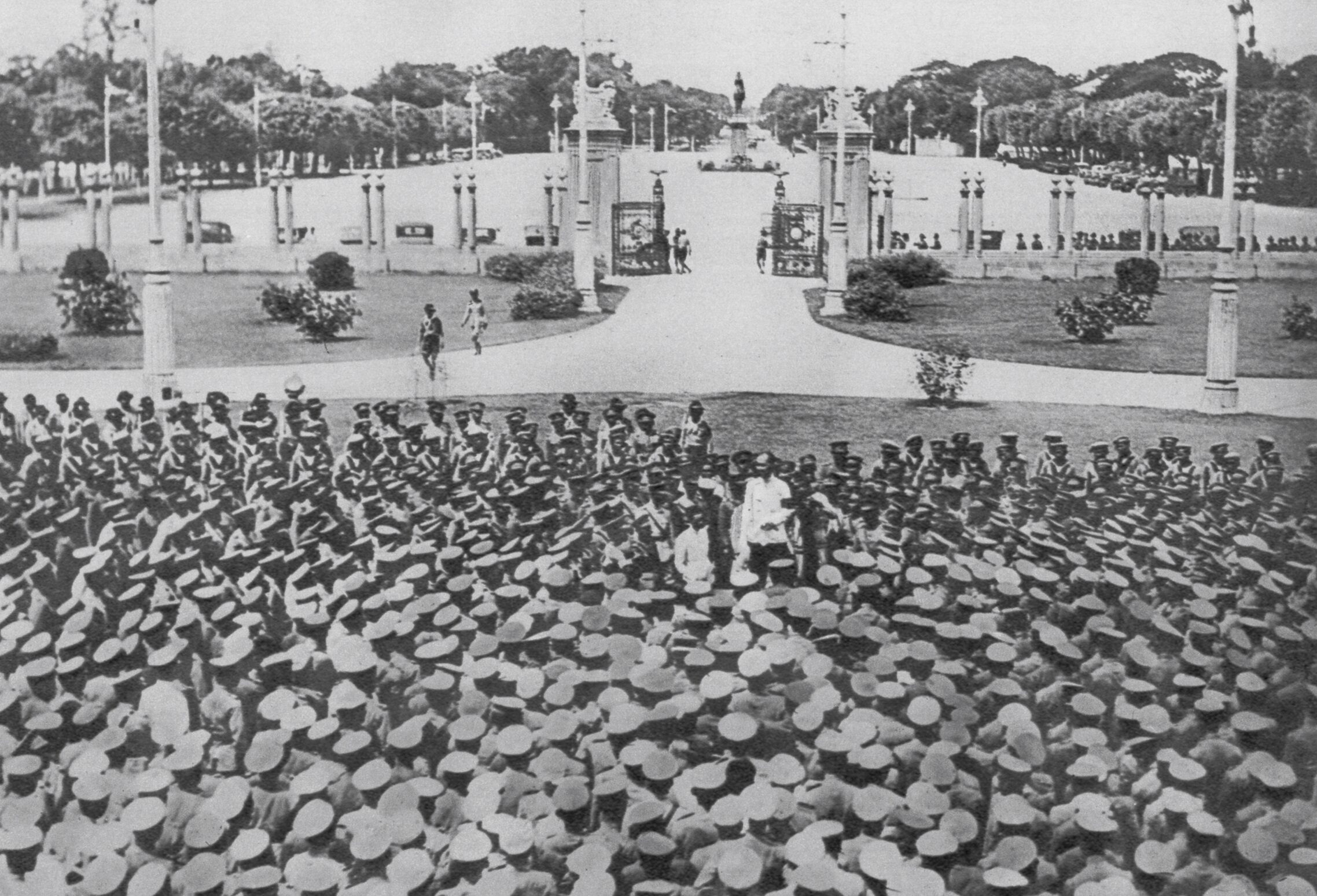
Phraya Manopakorn Nititada addressing the crowd at Ananta Samakhom Throne Hall.

Despite his lofty ideals and Western education, Pridi's version of democracy faced the same dilemma that Prajadhipok's version did: the notion simply that the country, especially the rural populace was not yet ready for it. Within days, the Khana Ratsadon had turned Siam into a one-party state with institutions such as the "People's Assembly" and the position of "President of the People's Committee". However, Khana Ratsadon showed their bipartisanship when they recommended the appointment of lawyer and Privy Councillor Phraya Manopakorn Nititada as the first President of the People's Committee and in effect the first Prime Minister of Siam. However, infighting within the government over Pridi's "Draft National Economic Plan", the so-called "Yellow Cover Dossier", and the actions of the conservative prime minister would eventually lead to the first coup d'état by Phraya Manopakorn Nititada on 1 April 1933.

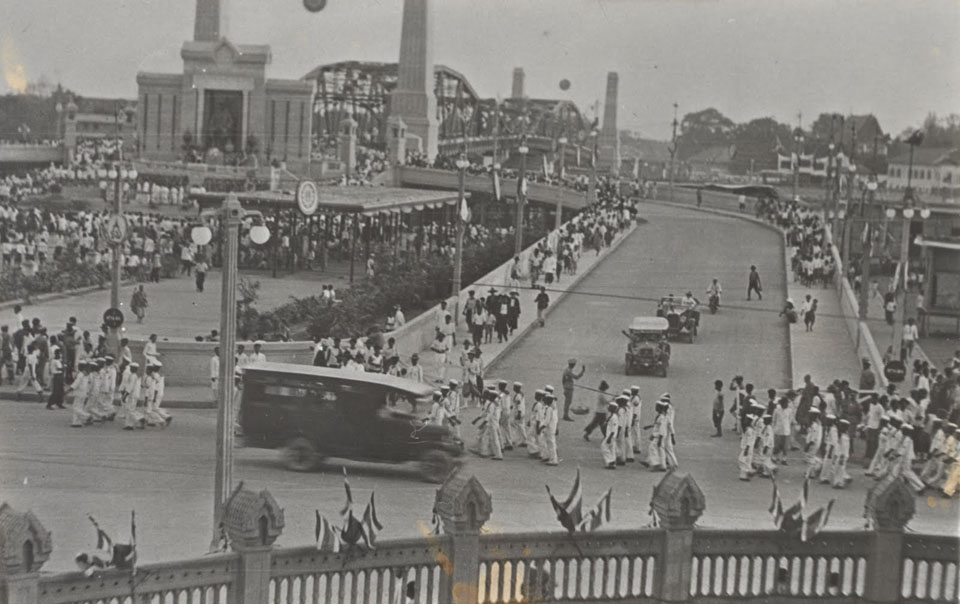
Sesquicentennial celebrations.

In late 1932, the King wrote to his nephew Prince Chula Chakrabongse about his decision to return to Bangkok: "...we were all quite aware that we were probably going to our death." The many unsettled constitutional roles of the crown and the dissatisfaction with Phraya Phahon's seizure of power culminated in October 1933 in a counter-coup, the Boworadet Rebellion staged by royalist factions. The royalists were led by Prince Boworadet and the many others who had permanently lost their influence and positions because of the seizure of power by the Khana Ratsadon. The rebellion was a failure, and although there is no evidence whatsoever that Prajadhipok was involved, his neutrality and indecisiveness during the brief conflict led to the loss of his credibility and prestige. Three years after the revolution, King Prajadhipok abdicated the throne and left Siam never to return. He died in England in 1941, during World War II. He was replaced as king by his nine-year-old nephew Prince Ananda Mahidol (King Rama VIII), who at that time was attending school in Lausanne, Switzerland.

== Legacy ==
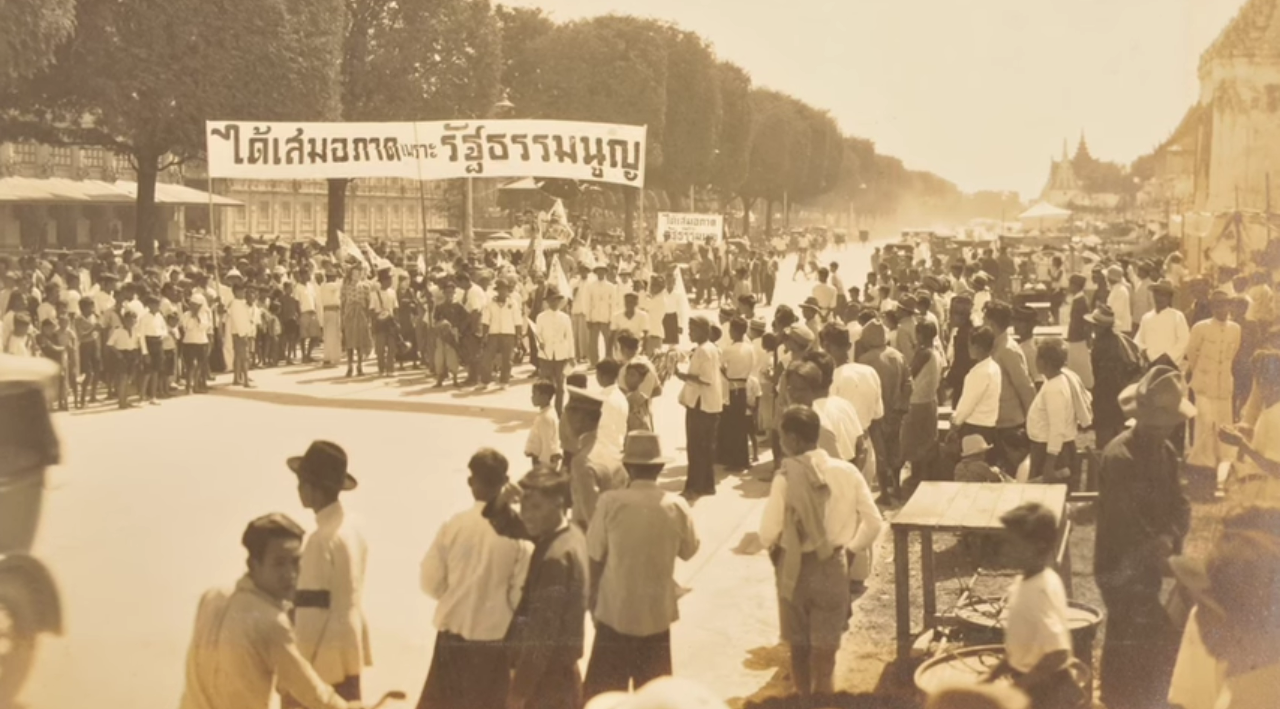
Public perception and discourse over the 1932 revolution

Public perception and discourse over the 1932 revolution has fluctuated over time. With the revival of the role of the monarchy initiated by the government of Sarit Thanarat in the 1960s, the state began downplaying the significance of 1932. Public observation of 24 June as National Day was abandoned in favour of King Bhumibol's birthday on 5 December. The events were glossed over by school textbooks, while views describing the actions of the People's Party as premature, and the idea that Vajiravudh and Prajadhipok had been making their own preparations for giving democracy to the people when ready were popularized.

The Siamese revolution of 1932 has also been depicted in the 2024 Thai animated film, 2475 Dawn of Revolution. The film is subject to both praise and criticism.
