= Phraya Songsuradet =

Thai colonel (1892–1944)

Colonel Phraya Songsuradej พระยาทรงสุรเดช
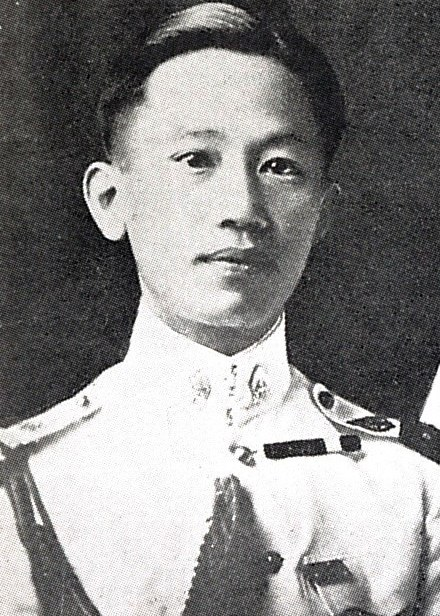
- Born: Thep; 12 August 1892; Bangkok, Siam
- Died: 1 June 1944 (aged 51); Phnom Penh, Cambodia, French Indochina
- Military career
- Allegiance: Siam
- Branch: Royal Siamese Army
- Service years: 1913–1938
- Rank: Colonel

Colonel Thep Phanthumsen (Note: Also spelled Bandhumasena.) (Thai: เทพ พันธุมเสน; 12 August 1892 – 1 June 1944), better known by the noble title Phraya Songsuradet (พระยาทรงสุรเดช), was a Thai military officer and member of the People's Party. As a cadet he studied at the Royal Prussian Main Cadet Institute and was a leading member of the senior army officers responsible for the Siamese revolution of 1932. After the revolution, he became de facto chief of the whole military.

He had conflicts with Plaek Phibunsongkhram, who was a junior military officer in many serious matters. After Phibunsongkhram's rise to power in 1938, these conflicts became the allegations in the subsequent Songsuradet rebellion.

== Biography ==
Thep Phanthumsen was born in a military family on 12 August 1892 at his father's home at Suan Chao Chet (location of Territorial Defense Command in present) on the beginning of Charoen Krung Road, Phra Nakhon Province (later Bangkok). His father was an artillery officer named Lieutenant Tai Phanthumsen (ร้อยโท ไท้ พันธุมเสน), who served in the 1st Battery of Artillery. While he was studying in the Royal Military Academy (later Chulachomklao Royal Military Academy) his parents suddenly died. His older brother became a benefactor. Because he was an excellent cadet he received a scholarship to study army engineer science in Imperial Germany. Upon graduation, he received the rank of Fähnrich (Private First Class). After that, he continued his studies at the commissioned military level until he received the rank of Degen-Fähnrich (Acting Second Lieutenant) and entered the military service in Magdeburg, later he returned to Siam (present-day Thailand) in the year 1915, after a total of 8 years of living in Imperial Germany.

Thanks to his time in Germany, he was fluent in both Thai and German.

In Siam, he was an engineer who played a huge role in constructing railways in many regions of the country, such as northern line from Khun Tan Tunnel to Chiang Mai Province etc. He received the highest rank as a Colonel and his highest duty was Chief of Directorate of Operations in 1932, shortly before the revolution. In the revolution he did all the thinking and planning himself and did not reveal to anyone else until one day before actual action. Because he was a highly respected person in the military circles as a military academic, he was regarded as one of The Four Musketeers (สี่ทหารเสือ; consisting of Phraya Songsuradej, Phraya Phahonphonphayuhasena, Phraya Ritthiakhaney and Phra Phrasasphithayayut) who were the highest leaders of Khana Ratsadon. Sulak Sivaraksa, political commentator and influencer said that he was the smartest and most talented of these four.

He was exiled to Indochina in January 1939 following a rift with the Prime Minister Plaek Phibunsongkhram. His life in Phnom Penh was full of difficulties, because he had almost no assets left. He had to make a living by repairing bicycles and making dessert for sale with his wife, who had to grind flour manually. Phraya Songsuradej died on 1 June 1944 at an abandoned mansion in Phnom Penh with sepsis (but with conspiracy theory that he died due to being poisoned).

== Noble titles ==
- 20 April 1918: Luang Narongsongkram (หลวงณรงค์สงคราม)
- 9 July 1924: Phra Songsuradej (พระทรงสุรเดช)
- 6 November 1931: Phraya Songsuradej (พระยาทรงสุรเดช)
- 15 May 1939: Abolition of nobility
