= Sakdina =

Thai system of social hierarchy

Sakdina (Thai: ศักดินา) was a system of social hierarchy in use from the Ayutthaya to early Rattanakosin periods of Thai history. It assigned a numerical rank to each person depending on their status, and served to determine their precedence in society, and especially among the nobility. The numbers represented the number of rai of land a person was entitled to own—sakdina literally translates as "field prestige"—although there is no evidence that it was employed literally. The Three Seals Law, for example, specifies a sakdina of 100,000 for the Maha Uparat, 10,000 for the Chao Phraya Chakri, 600 for learned Buddhist monks, 20 for commoners and 5 for slaves. Borommatrailokkanat fixed the scale by law in 1454, in the Law of the Civil Hierarchy and the Law of Military and Provincial Hierarchies.

The term is also used to refer to the feudal-like social system of the period, where common freemen or phrai (ไพร่) were subject to conscription or corvée labour in service of the kingdom for half of the months of the year, under the control of an overseer or munnai (มูลนาย). A clause of the Law on the Institution of Litigation shows freemen already registered under a munnai in 1356, a century before the scale was written down.

Since 1945, the term "sakdina" has been used frequently as a critique of Thai political authority. In the 1950s, Thai intellectuals like Jit Phumisak and Kukrit Pramoj both critiqued the concept in different ways. Jit Phumisak viewed sakdina as a persistent remnant of exploitative class relations in his analysis of what is typically translated as "feudalism." Kukrit Pramoj claimed that sakdina was a fundamentally Thai form of social organization. Kukrit claimed that Thai and European feudalism were fundamentally different in his essay Farang Sakdina. Demonstrators in large demonstrations in 2020-2021 Thai protests also criticized the persistence of authoritarian "sakdina" values in the administration of the Thai government.
