= Klai Kangwon Palace =

Thai royal residence

Coordinates: 12°35′18″N 99°57′18″E

Klai Kangwon Palace (Thai: วังไกลกังวล, lit. 'far from worry', RTGS: Wang Klai Kangwon, pronounced [wāŋ klāj kāŋ.wōn]) was the primary summer royal residence of King Bhumibol Adulyadej (Rama IX) of Thailand. It is in Hua Hin District in Prachuap Khiri Khan Province. Commissioned by King Prajadhipok (Rama VII) in 1926 and completed in 1933, the palace's main residence buildings are named Piam Suk, Pluk Kasem, Oep Prem, and Em Pridi.

== History ==
The palace was built by King Prajadhipok (Rama VII) in 1926 using his personal land given to Queen Rambai Barni. The designing architect was Mom Chao Itthithepsan Kridakorn, the chief of the Silpakorn Sathan. It was initially called "Suan Klai Kangwon" (Klai Kangwon Garden). King Bhumibol Adulyadej (Rama IX) then renamed the it "Phra Ratchawang Klai Kangwon", but as there has not been any official orders, the palace is still called "Wang Klai Kangwon".

== Buildings ==
- Phra Tamnak Piam Suk (Thai: พระตำหนักเปี่ยมสุข) is the Spanish-styled two-storey building with a tower. It is the primary building of the palace area and was the summer residence hall of King Bhumibol Adulyadej and Queen Sirikit. It was also the residence of King Prachadipok and Queen Rambai Barni.
- Phra Tamnak Noi (Thai: พระตำหนักน้อย), was the residence of Princess Srinagarindra.
- Phra Tamnak Pruk Kasem (พระตำหนักปลุกเกษม) is a mixture of Thai traditional and modern architecture. Currently, this residence hall serves as a summer residence to the Princess Royal Sirindhorn.
- Phra Tamnak Oep Prem Em Pridi (พรตำหนักเอิบเปรม เอมปรีย์) is the residence of the royal family, a single-storey bungalow constructed especially for the seaside.
- Rueng Pavilion (ศาลาเริง), is a multi-purpose pavilion used for Buddhist ceremonies, sporting events, musical performances, films, and other activities.
- Ratcha Pracha Samakhom Pavilion (ศาลาราชประชาสมาคม), which means "the King and the people care for each other", formerly the Multi-Purpose Building (อาคารเอนกประสงค์), was renamed in November 2013 to its current name prior to the celebration of King Rama IX's 86th birthday. It was the only grand audience during his reign that was held outside Bangkok. The building, is a two-storey building, the lower floor is an empty space used for activities while the upper floor is a conference hall which allows audiences to be given without returning to Bangkok.

== Functions ==
The palace's premises were used as the royal residence of King Bhumibol Adulyadej several times during his reign, as well as serving as his alternate residence since 2010. The Piam Suk Residence Hall was the site of royal audiences on many occasions. A grand audience was held on 5 December 2013 at the Ratcha Pracha Samakhom Pavilion.
