= Phraya Phahonphonphayuhasena =

Prime Minister of Siam from 1933 to 1938

Phraya Phahon Phonphayuhasena MPCh MWM PCh
- พหลพลพยุหเสนา
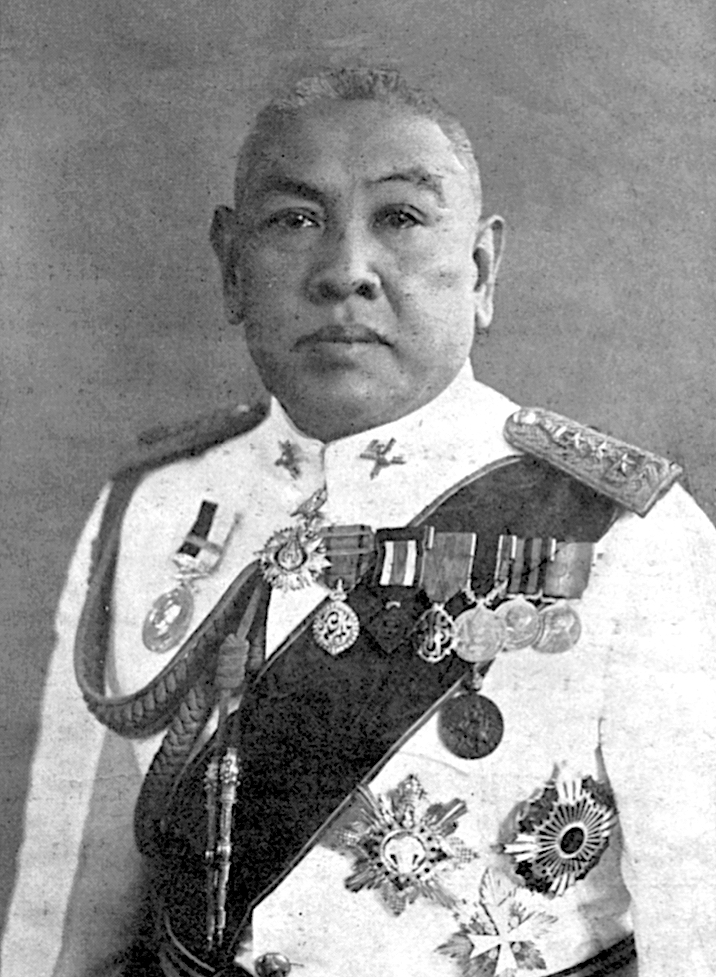
- Phahon c. 1939–1940

2nd Prime Minister of Siam
- In office 21 June 1933 – 16 December 1938
- Monarchs: Prajadhipok; Ananda Mahidol
- Preceded by: Manopakorn Nitithada
- Succeeded by: Plaek Phibunsongkhram
Ministerial offices 1933–1937
Minister of Agriculture
In office 9 August 1937 – 21 December 1937
Prime Minister	Himself
Preceded by	Sara Aimmarisi
Succeeded by	Sara Aimmarisi
Minister of Finance
In office 1 August 1935 – 12 February 1936
Prime Minister	Himself
Preceded by	Plod Vichear na Songkhla
Succeeded by	Serm Kritsanamara
Minister of Foreign Affairs
In office 22 September 1934 – 1 August 1935
Prime Minister	Himself
Preceded by	Tom Bunnag
Succeeded by	Srisena Sombutsiri
Minister of Defence
In office 1 April 1934 – 22 September 1934
Prime Minister	Himself
Preceded by	Phraya Prasertsongkram
Succeeded by	Plaek Phibunsongkhram
Minister of Interior
In office 16 December 1933 – 29 March 1934
Prime Minister	Himself
Preceded by	Phraya Udomphong Phensawat
Succeeded by	Pridi Banomyong
Minister of Public Instruction
In office 16 December 1933 – 29 March 1934
Prime Minister	Himself
Preceded by	Chaophraya Thammasakmontri
Succeeded by	Phra Sarasardpraphan

Commander-in-chief of the Royal Thai Army
- In office 6 August 1932 – 1 January 1938
- Preceded by: Prince Vudhijaya Chalermlabha
- Succeeded by: Plaek Phibunsongkhram
- In office 25 August 1944 – 29 March 1946
- Preceded by: Phichit Kriangsakphichit
- Succeeded by: Adul Aduldejaraj

Personal details
- Born: Phot (Note: At that time, Thais did not have surnames.); 29 March 1887 Bangkok, Siam
- Died: 14 February 1947 (aged 59) Bangkok, Thailand
- Party: Khana Ratsadon
- Spouses: Phit (divorced); Bunlong
- Children: 7
- Education: Royal Siamese Military Academy; Prussian Military Academy

Military service
- Allegiance: Thailand
- Branch/service: Royal Thai Army; Royal Thai Armed Forces
- Years of service: 1914-1947
- Rank: General; Admiral; Air Chief Marshal

Phraya Phahonphonphayuhasena (Note: Thai: พระยาพหลพลพยุหเสนา, Thai pronunciation: [pʰrá.jaː.pʰá.hǒn.pʰon.pʰá.jú.hà.sě.naː]) (29 March 1887 – 14 February 1947), simply known as Phraya Phahon, was a Thai military leader and politician. Born Phot Phahonyothin (Note: Thai: พจน์ พหลโยธิน. Prior to 1913, he was known as just Phot.) and briefly educated in Germany, he was a member of the Khana Ratsadon and launched a coup d'état to become Prime Minister of Siam in 1933, a position he held until 1938.

== Early life ==
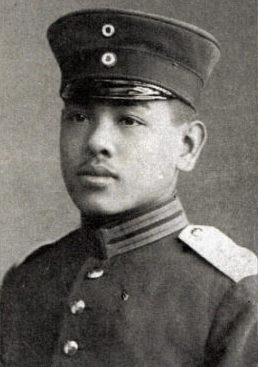
Phot in Germany, 1905

Phot was born in Phra Nakhon Province (present-day Bangkok) to a Teochew Thai Chinese father, Colonel Kim (กิ่ม), and a Thai Mon mother, Chap (จับ). His family took the surname Phahonyothin in 1913 per royal decree.

After attending the Chulachomklao Royal Military Academy, in 1903 Phot was sent by royal scholarship to study at the Prussian Military Academy (Preußische Hauptkadettenanstalt) in the town of Lichterfelde, near Berlin, German Empire, where he was allegedly a classmate of Hermann Göring.

He was then sent to study at the Engineering College of Copenhagen in Denmark, but was only able to complete one year as his scholarship funds ran out, forcing him to return to Siam in 1912. In 1931 he was elevated to the title of Phraya Phahonphonphayuhasena by King Prajadhipok (or Rama VII) and received the rank of colonel. In 1932 he became Commander of the Royal Siamese Army.

== Revolutionary leader ==
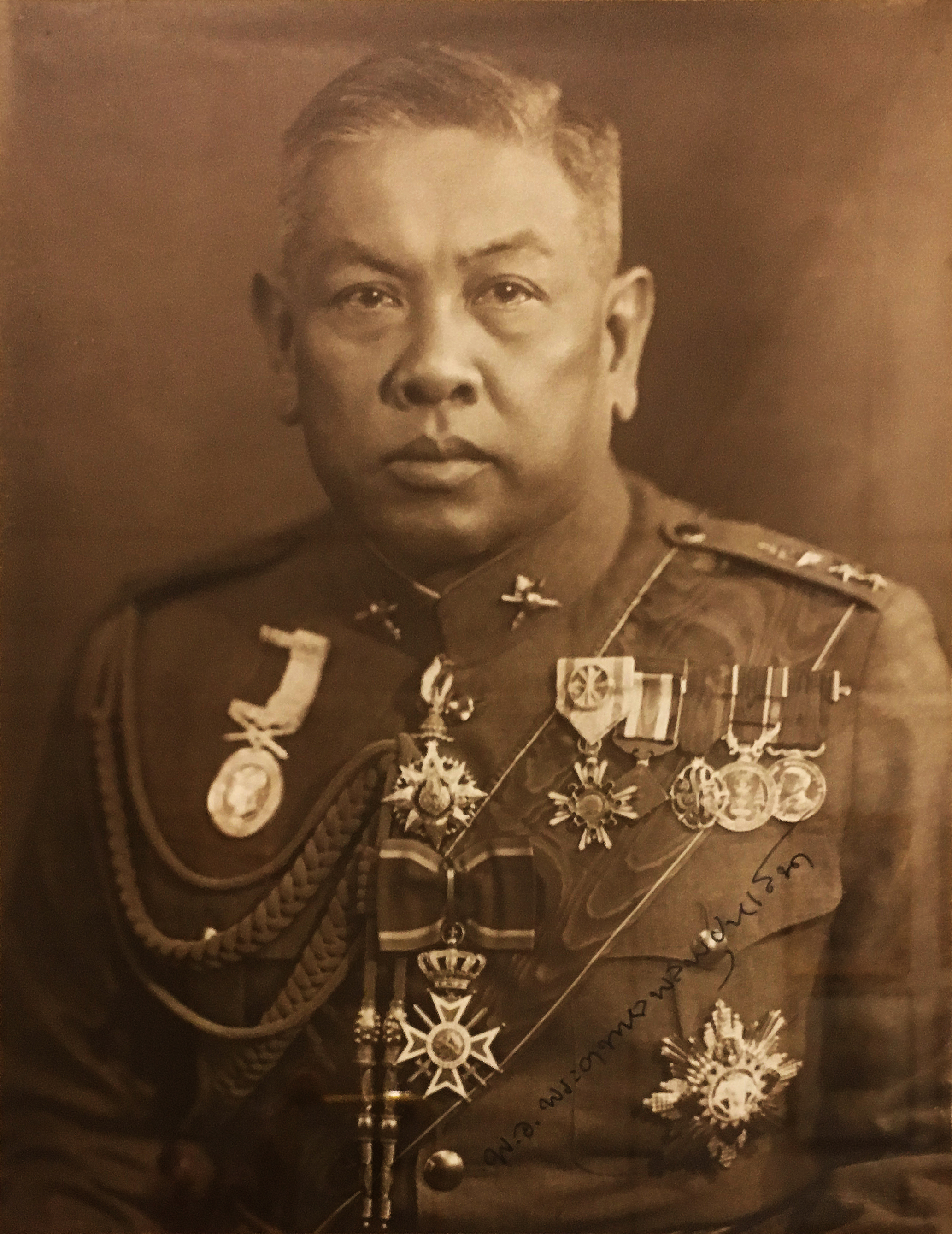
Phraya Phahon in 1931

Phraya Phahon was an important member of a group of conspirators known as the "Four Musketeers" (4 ทหารเสือ). They were part of the Khana Ratsadon (or 'People's Party') who carried out the revolution of 1932. After the 1932 coup, three factions formed among the political and military leaders of Khana Ratsadon: the senior military faction led by Phraya Phahon; the junior army and navy faction led by Luang Phibunsongkhram; and the civilian faction led by Pridi Banomyong. Also he, Phraya Songsuradet, and Phraya Rithi-akkhaney were the collective military defenders of capital and exercised power on behalf of the king.

As its most senior member, Phraya Phahon was viewed as the de facto leader of the Khana Ratsadon and the revolution itself. It was Phraya Phahon who read the Declaration of the New Siamese State in the Royal Plaza that declared the end of absolute monarchy and the establishment of the constitutional Siamese state. Because of the key role he played in the revolution he was rewarded with a high position in the new government and was made a member of the new cabinet.

In March 1933 a constitutional crisis developed in Siam over the "Yellow Cover Dossier" incident, precipitated by Pridi's draft economic plan, which contained socialist elements. Because of this, Phraya Manopakorn Nititada, the prime minister, expelled him from the cabinet and suspended the constitution. This action upset many in the People's Party who supported Pridi, including Phraya Phahon. On 15 June Phraya Phahon resigned from the cabinet citing health reasons. In truth, he and a couple of military officers planned to overthrow Phraya Mano's increasingly authoritarian government. On 20 June a bloodless coup was carried out, led by Phraya Phahon. The following day, Phraya Phahon appointed himself the second Prime Minister of Siam and immediately sent a report to King Prajadhipok explaining the objectives of the coup. The king reluctantly endorsed him and exiled Phraya Mano to British Malaya.

== Prime Minister of Thailand (1933–1938) ==
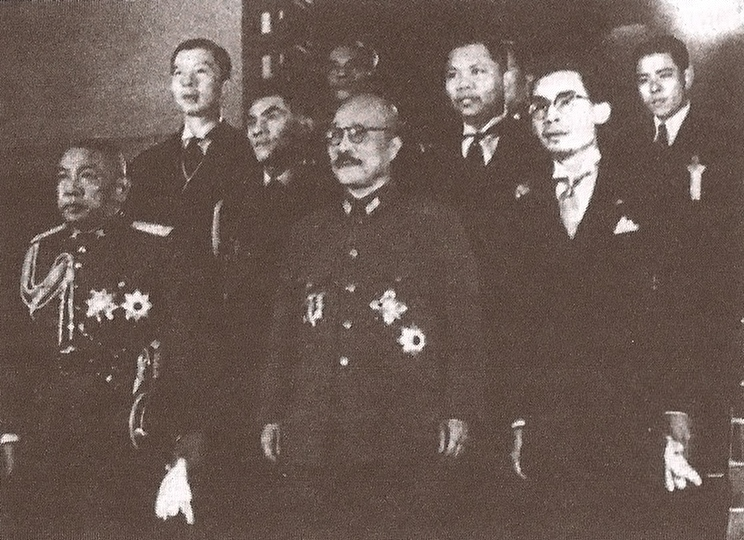
Phraya Phahon with former acquaintance Hideki Tōjō in Tokyo in 1942, as Phibun's envoy.

The next five years were a struggle to maintain power. In October 1933, a royalist revolt against Phraya Phahon's government, the Boworadet Rebellion, occurred only four months after his becoming prime minister. After weeks of fighting, government troops emerged victorious and Phraya Phahon was able to solidify his position. The cabinet was divided politically. The government was maintained only by the force of his personality. Luang Phibunsongkhram, a trusted confidant, became minister of defence under the new government and he began to acquire greater power and influence in preparation for his eventual ascension to the premiership.

The beginning of the end for Phraya Phahon's time as prime minister began in 1937 when a scandal erupted involving the sale of crown real estate to high-ranking officials at below-market prices. After a near collapse that year, the first direct elections for the People's Assembly took place on 7 November 1937. Those in Phraya Phahon's cabinet found themselves an ideological and political minority. After budget issues in 1938, the cabinet was forced to resign in September 1938 followed by elections in December which resulted in Luang Phibunsongkhram becoming the prime minister of Thailand.

== Retirement and death ==
After his term as prime minister, General Phraya Phahon retired from public life, though he served as Inspector General of the Royal Thai Armed Forces during World War II. He died in February 1947 at the age of 59 of a cerebral haemorrhage. It was said that when he died, despite the fact that he had held many positions in government, his family lacked the funds to pay for his funeral before Luang Phibunsongkhram, his protege and the incumbent prime minister, stepped in.

== Legacy ==
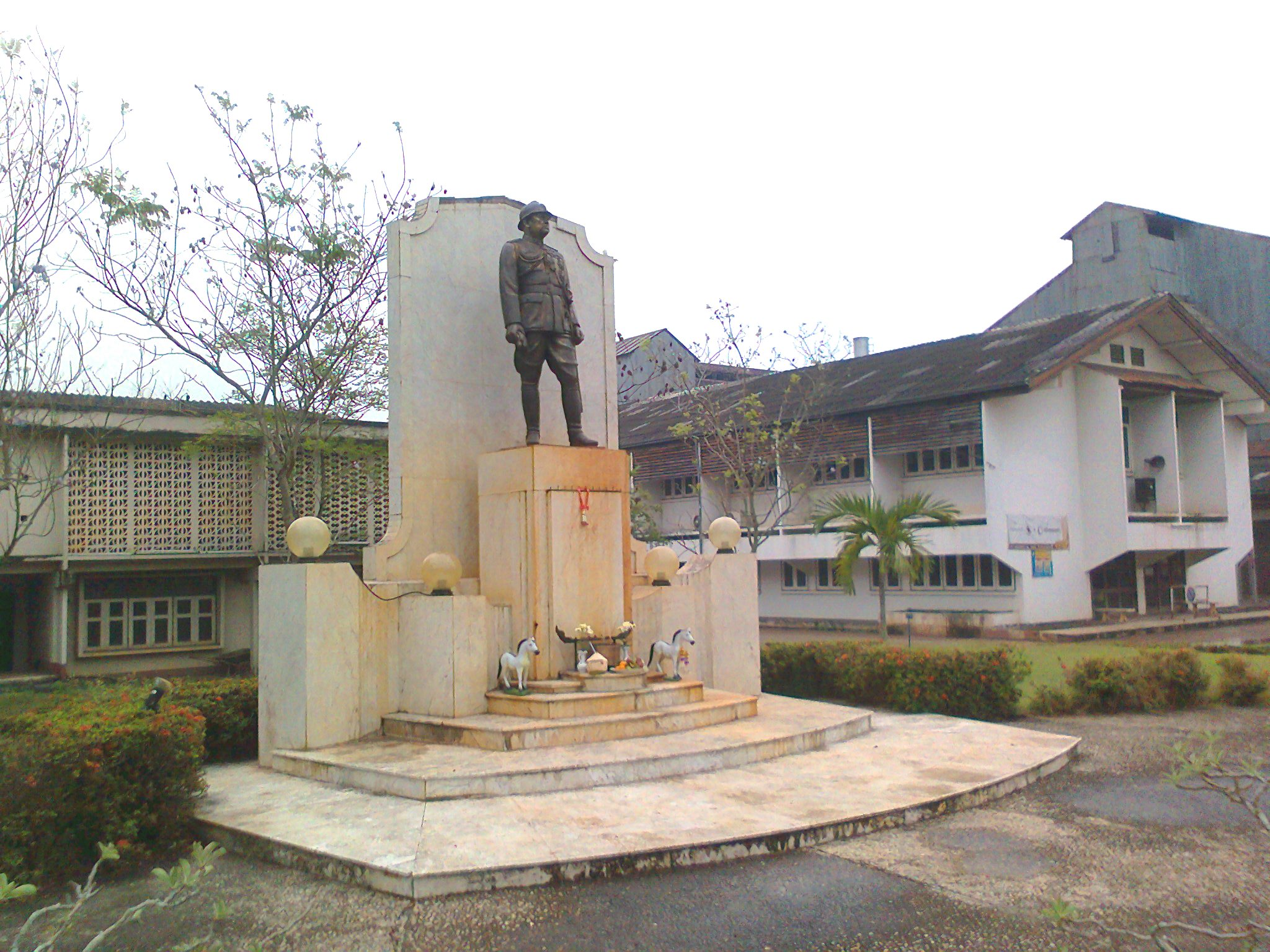
Phraya Phahon Monument at Lampang

Phahonyothin Road, which runs from Bangkok to the border of Burma in the north, is named after Phraya Phahon. Formerly known as Prachathipat Road, Field Marshal Plaek Phibunshongkhram renamed the road in his honour. A hospital in Kanchanaburi Province, Phaholpolpayuhasena Hospital is also named in his honour.

A Royal Thai Army artillery base in Lopburi Province bore the name of General Phraya Phahon until 2019 when, at the order of the king Vajiralongkorn, it was renamed King Bhumibol base. Long-standing statues of Phraya Phahon and Field Marshal Plaek Phibunsongkhram installed at the base are to be removed and replaced by a statue of King Bhumibol.

== Honours ==
=== Noble titles ===
- 20 April 1918: Luang Sarayuth Sorasit (หลวงสรายุทธ์สรสิทธิ์)
- 9 July 1924: Phra Sarayuth Sorasit (พระสรายุทธ์สรสิทธิ์)
- 6 November 1931: Phraya Phahonphonphayuhasena (พระยาพหลพลพยุหเสนา)
- 15 May 1942: Abolition of nobility
- 15 February 1945: Title restoration. Phraya Phahonphonphayuhasena (พระยาพหลพลพยุหเสนา)

=== Thai decorations ===
- Knight Grand Cross of the Order of Chula Chom Klao
- Knight Grand Cordon of the Order of the White Elephant
- Commander of the Order of the Crown of Thailand
- Victory Medal - Franco-Thai War with flames
- Safeguarding the Constitution Medal
- Dushdi Mala Medal Pin of Service to the Nation (Military)
- Medal for Service in the Interior - Pacific War
- Chakra Mala Medal
- King Rama VII Royal Cypher Medal, Fourth Class
- King Rama VIII Royal Cypher Medal, First Class
- King Rama VI Coronation Medal
- King Rama VII Coronation Medal
- 150 Years Commemoration of Bangkok Medal

=== Foreign Decorations ===
- Grand Cordon of the Order of the Rising Sun with three paulownia
- Grand Cross of the Order of the German Eagle with star
- Commander of the Order of Orange-Nassau
- Order of the Sacred Treasure, Fourth Class

== General references ==
- Baker, Chris; Phongpaichit, Pasuk (2009). A History of Thailand (2nd, paper ed.). Cambridge University Press. ISBN 9780521759151.
- Stowe, Judith A. Siam Becomes Thailand: A Story of Intrigue. C. Hurst & Co. Publishers, 1991

Political offices
Preceded by Phraya Manopakorn Nitithada	Prime Minister of Siam; 1933–1938	Succeeded by Plaek Phibunsongkhram
Preceded by Phraya Udomphong Phensawat	Minister of Interior; 1933–1934	Succeeded by Luang Praditmanutham
Preceded by Chaophraya Thammasakmontri	Minister of Education; 1933–1934	Succeeded by Phra Sarasasphraphan
Preceded by Phraya Prasertsongkram	Minister of Defence; 1934	Succeeded by Plaek Phibunsongkhram
Preceded by Phraya Abhibanrajamaitri	Minister of Foreign Affairs; 1934–1935	Succeeded by Phraya Srisena
Preceded by Phraya Manavaratsevi	Minister of Finance; 1935–1936	Succeeded by Phraya Chaiyotsombat
Preceded by Phraya Ritthi Akane	Minister of Agriculture; 1937	Succeeded by Phraya Ritthi Akane
Party political offices
First	Head of the military faction of the Khana Ratsadon; 1929–1938	Succeeded by Plaek Phibunsongkhram
Preceded by Luang Praditmanutham	Leader of the Khana Ratsadon; 1932–1947	Abolished position
Military offices
Preceded by The Prince of Singha as Minister of War	Commander-in-chief of the Royal Siamese Army; 1932–1938	Succeeded by Plaek Phibunsongkhram
Preceded by Phichit Kriangsakphichit	Commander-in-chief of the Royal Siamese Army; 1944–1946	Succeeded by Adul Aduldejaraj
