= Thai nobility =

Historical social class in Thailand

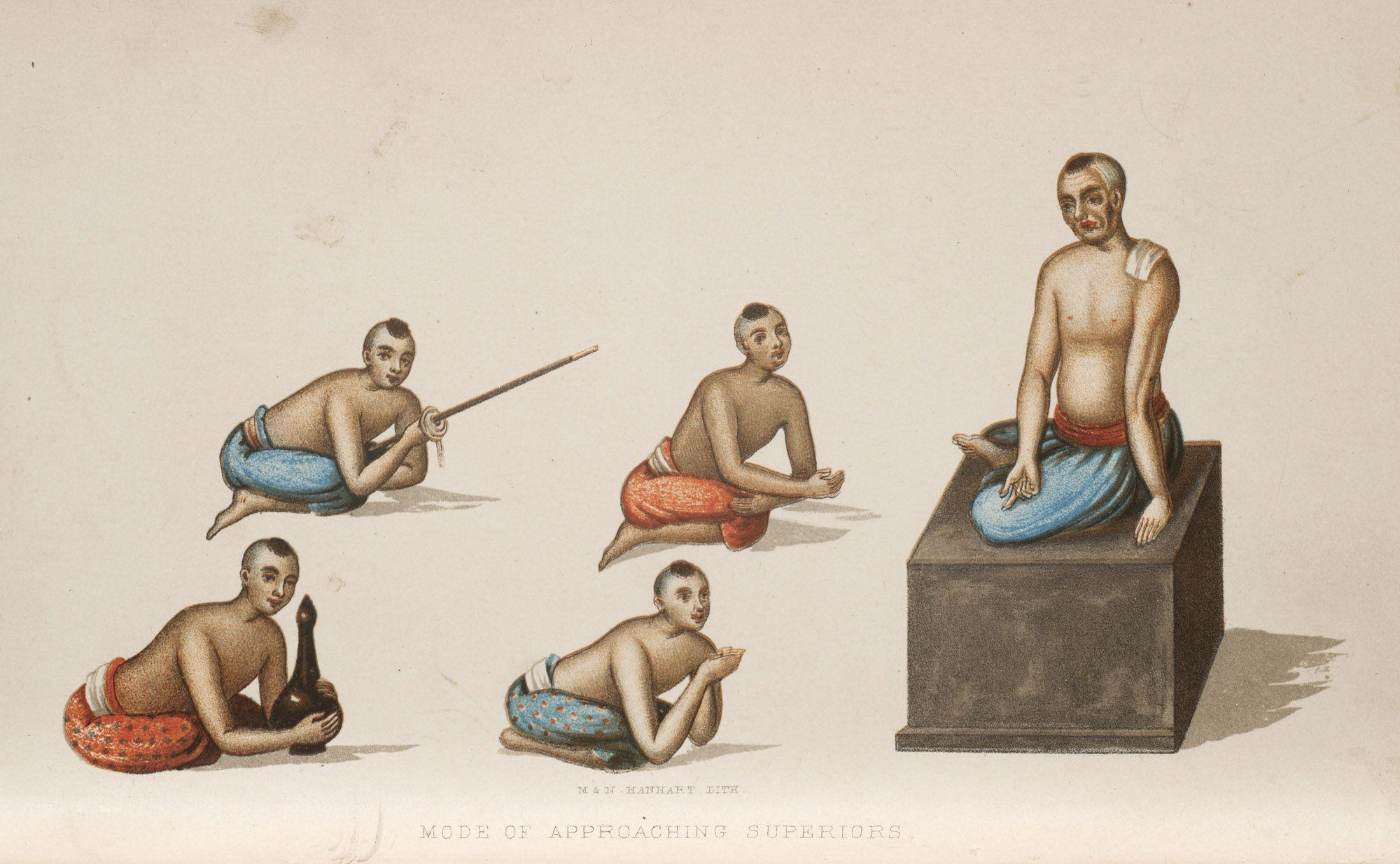
Illustration from Sir John Bowring's The Kingdom and People of Siam (1857) depicting the custom of prostration and deference to superiors in 19th-century Siam.

The Thai nobility was a social class comprising titled officials (khunnang, Thai: ขุนนาง) in the service of the monarchy. They formed part of a hierarchical social system which developed from the time of the Ayutthaya Kingdom (14th century – 1767), through the Thonburi (1767–1782) and early Rattanakosin (1782 onwards) periods. Reforms by King Chulalongkorn ended the system around the end of the 19th century, though noble titles continued to be granted until the abolition of absolute monarchy in 1932.

Thai noble titles comprise a rank and a title, which denote the holder's post or office. Unlike in European aristocracies, Thai noble titles were not inherited, but individually granted based on personal merit. Nevertheless, familial influence was substantial, and some families were able to accumulate large amounts of wealth and power, especially during the 17th to 19th centuries.

== History ==
While the use of noble rank and title words are found in the documents of many early Tai city states including Sukhothai, the earliest extensive descriptions are from the administrative reforms introduced in 1448 by King Borommatrailokanat of Ayutthaya, which by then had become the dominant polity in the region. The reforms established official titles for high-ranking ministers of the chatusadom system, and the rank of phra was added to the previously used khun and nai, in order to accommodate the expanding machinery of government. (The ranks luang and okya were further introduced during the mid- and late-16th century, respectively.) The sakdina system, which assigned a numeral rank representing the amount of land one was entitled to own, was also officially described.

Nobles were not directly remunerated for their service, but enjoyed earnings and benefits derived from their office and the work of commoners (phrai) under their command. Unlike in European aristocracies, Thai noble titles were not inherited, but individually granted by the king or his ministers based on personal merit. Noble families could, however, present their sons to the royal household, placing them at an advantage to succeeding in those positions. This practice became especially influential from the 17th century, when war subsided and commerce flourished, leading personal patronage to displace martial ability as the determining factor for promotions. Several noble families gained much power and influence during the late Ayutthaya period, and even more so during early Rattanakosin; some, such as the Bunnags, effectively became as powerful as the monarchy.

King Chulalongkorn (Rama V, r. 1868–1910) introduced reforms that ended the system that allowed nobles to command manpower, and transformed titled nobles into paid officials under a modern civil service system. His successor Vajiravudh (Rama VI, r. 1910–1925) introduced a military-style promotion-based rank system, superseding the traditional titles, though they could still be granted at the king's discretion.

Following the abolition of absolute monarchy in 1932, royal decrees issued during the government of Plaek Phibunsongkhram in 1942 abolished the use of noble titles and the rank system. While the decree abolishing titles was repealed by the Khuang Aphaiwong government two years later, allowing previously held titles to be reinstated, the granting of noble titles never resumed after 1932.

== Noble titles ==
Thai noble titles comprise a rank (บรรดาศักดิ์, bandasak) and a title (ราชทินนาม, ratchathinnanam), which denote the holder's post or office (ตำแหน่ง, tamnaeng). For example, Chaophraya Chakri was the full title of the samuhanayok, one of the king's two chief ministers. Chaophraya was the highest rank of the nobility, and Chakri was the title associated with the post. The titleholder would also have received a numerical rank under the sakdina system.

Most major titles were tied to the post, and shared by successive holders, while others could be created specifically for a singular person by the King. The latter was the case especially from the late 19th century, as the proliferation of officials necessitated the creation of a large number of titles.

Nobles would be known almost exclusively by their current title. Historical references to holders of shared titles conventionally include the person's birth name in parentheses, e.g. Chao Phraya Chakri (Mut), who was chief minister under King Taksin.

The ranks, in descending order, are:

- Chaophraya (เจ้าพระยา, [tɕâ(ː)w pʰrā.jāː]); particularly esteemed individuals were referred to as somdet chaophraya and were appointed by the king.
- Phraya (พระยา, [pʰrā.jāː]); historically also appeared as okya (ออกญา, [ʔɔ̀ːk.jāː]), probably from the equivalent Khmer term oknha.
- Phra (พระ, [pʰráʔ])
- Luang (หลวง, [lǔaŋ])
- Khun (ขุน, [kʰǔn])
- Muen (หมื่น, [mɯ̀ːn])
- Phan (พัน, [pʰān])
- Nai (นาย, [nāːj])

== Posts and titles ==
Some of the noble posts and titles include:

=== Chief ministers ===
The samuhanayok was head of the Mahatthai. During the Ayutthaya period, office-holders took the title Chakri, with the rank of phraya. The rank was increased to chaophraya during Thonburi, and in Rattanakosin individualized titles were granted to each appointee. According to the Three Seals Law, the samuhanayok had a sakdina of 10,000.

The samuhakalahom was head of the Kalahom. Like the samuhanayok, the post had a sakdina of 10,000. Most of office-holders were titled Chaophraya Mahasena well into the Rattanakosin period.

=== Ministers ===
Four ministers headed the four government departments of the chatusadom. By the Rattanakosin period, the heads of the Krom Mueang or Nakhonban were titled Yommarat (ยมราช), with most having the rank of chaophraya. The head of the Krom Wang was titled Thammathikon after the department, or Thammathikoranathibodi. Most heads of the Krom Phra Khlang took the rank and title Chaophraya Phra Khlang, while during the Ayutthaya period the title was also called Kosathibodi. The heads of Krom Na or Kasettrathikan had the rank and title Chaophraya Phonlathep.

=== Provincial officials ===
The yokkrabat (ยกกระบัตร) was an official of the palace administration appointed to reside in provincial towns and oversee legal affairs. It was a long-established official post of administrative importance. The yokkrabat acted as the king's representative in legal matters, supervising adjudication and reporting on the conduct of governors and officials. In some contexts, the office functioned similarly to the head of a provincial court and a deputy to the governor. During the late nineteenth and early twentieth centuries, the traditional office was gradually replaced by a modern prosecution service, and in 1916 the title yokkrabat was formally abolished and replaced by public prosecutors under the Ministry of Justice.

=== Governors ===
Governorships were major noble positions, with several types of posts depending on the importance of the city. Each city had its associated noble title, e.g. Surasi for Phitsanulok, Surinluechai for Phetchaburi, Wichitphakdi for Chaiya, Aphaiphubet for Phra Tabong (Battambang), etc.
