= Kosit Panpiemras =

Thai businessman and politician (1943–2016)

- โฆสิต ปั้นเปี่ยมรัษฎ์
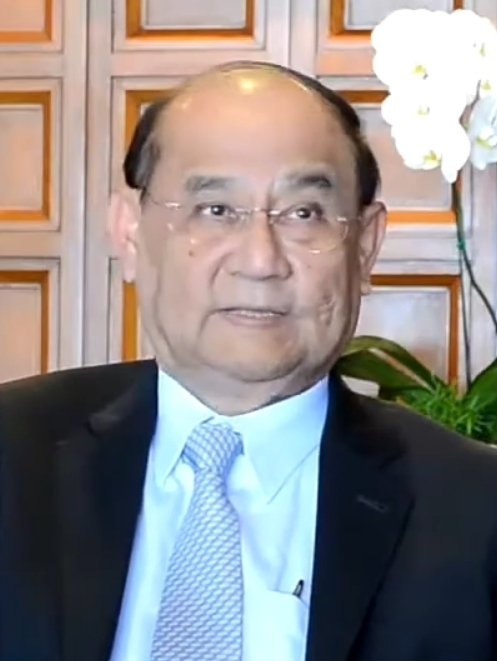
- Kosit Panpiemras in 2015

Deputy Prime Minister of Thailand
- In office 9 October 2006 – 6 February 2008
- Prime Minister: Surayud Chulanont

Minister of Industry
- In office 9 October 2006 – 6 February 2008
- Prime Minister: Surayud Chulanont
- Preceded by: Suriya Juangroongruangkit
- Succeeded by: Suwit Khunkitti
- In office 27 September 1996 – 24 November 1996
- Prime Minister: Banharn Silpa-archa
- Preceded by: Chaiwat Sinsuwong
- Succeeded by: Korn Dabbaransi

Finance Minister of Thailand
- In office 24 October 1997 – 14 November 1997
- Prime Minister: Chavalit Yongchaiyudh
- Preceded by: Thanong Bidaya
- Succeeded by: Tharin Nimmanhaemin

Minister of Agriculture and Cooperatives
- In office 10 June 1992 – 22 September 1992
- Prime Minister: Anand Panyarachun
- Preceded by: Pinit Juntarasurin
- Succeeded by: Nipon Prompan

Personal details
- Born: 28 May 1943 Bangkok, Thailand
- Died: 1 June 2016 (aged 73) Bangkok, Thailand
- Height: 1.67 m (5 ft 6 in)
- Spouse: Yubhana Panpiemras
- Education: Chulalongkorn University; University of Maryland

Kosit Panpiemras (28 May 1943 – 1 June 2016) was a Thai businessman and politician. He was chairman of Bangkok Bank, a leading Thai commercial bank, between 1999 and 2016. Following the 2006 Thailand coup, he was appointed advisor to the military junta. He previously held a number of cabinet posts under different government administrations. He died of cancer on 1 June 2016.

== Early life and education ==
Kosit was born and raised in Bang Lamphu oldest town in Bangkok. He completed secondary education from Saint Gabriel's College and he graduated with a bachelor's degree in finance (honors) from the Faculty of Political Science, Chulalongkorn University. Later he graduated with a master's degree in economics from the University of Maryland.

== Careers ==
He began to work as an economist World Bank In Washington, D.C., United States, and later returned to service until receiving the highest position, namely Deputy Secretary-General of the National Economic and Social Development Board (NESDB). He entered politics by accepting the post of Secretary-General of General Suchinda Kraprayoon in 1992 and was appointed Deputy Minister of Agriculture and Cooperatives. In the government of Anand Panyarachun he was re-appointed Minister of Agriculture and Cooperatives again in the government of Anand 1992.

Later in 1994, he was appointed executive director of Bangkok Bank until the year 1995, he was appointed Minister of Industry. In the government of Banharn Silpa-archa instead of Chaiwat Sinsuwong and the Minister of Finance. In the government of General Chavalit Yongchaiyudh instead of Thanong Bidaya. After that, in 1999 he took the position of Executive Chairman of Bangkok Bank.

He returned to politics again in the government of General Surayud Chulanont, taking the position of Deputy Prime Minister and the Minister of Industry and was appointed Acting Minister of Information and Communication Technology (ICT) in place of Sittichai Phokayudom, who resigned from the case of holding more than 5% of the shares since 30 September 2007.

Kosit was appointed a senator in 1996.

== Illness and death ==
He died of cancer on 1 June 2016 at King Chulalongkorn Memorial Hospital aged 73. In the granting royal water a royal representative is General Prem Tinsulanonda, the President of the Privy Council and Statesman.

== Honours ==
=== Royal decorations ===
- Order of the White Elephant - Special Class
- Order of the Crown of Thailand - Special Class
- Chakrabarti Mala Medal
