= Thailand and ASEAN Information Center =

Chulalongkorn University library

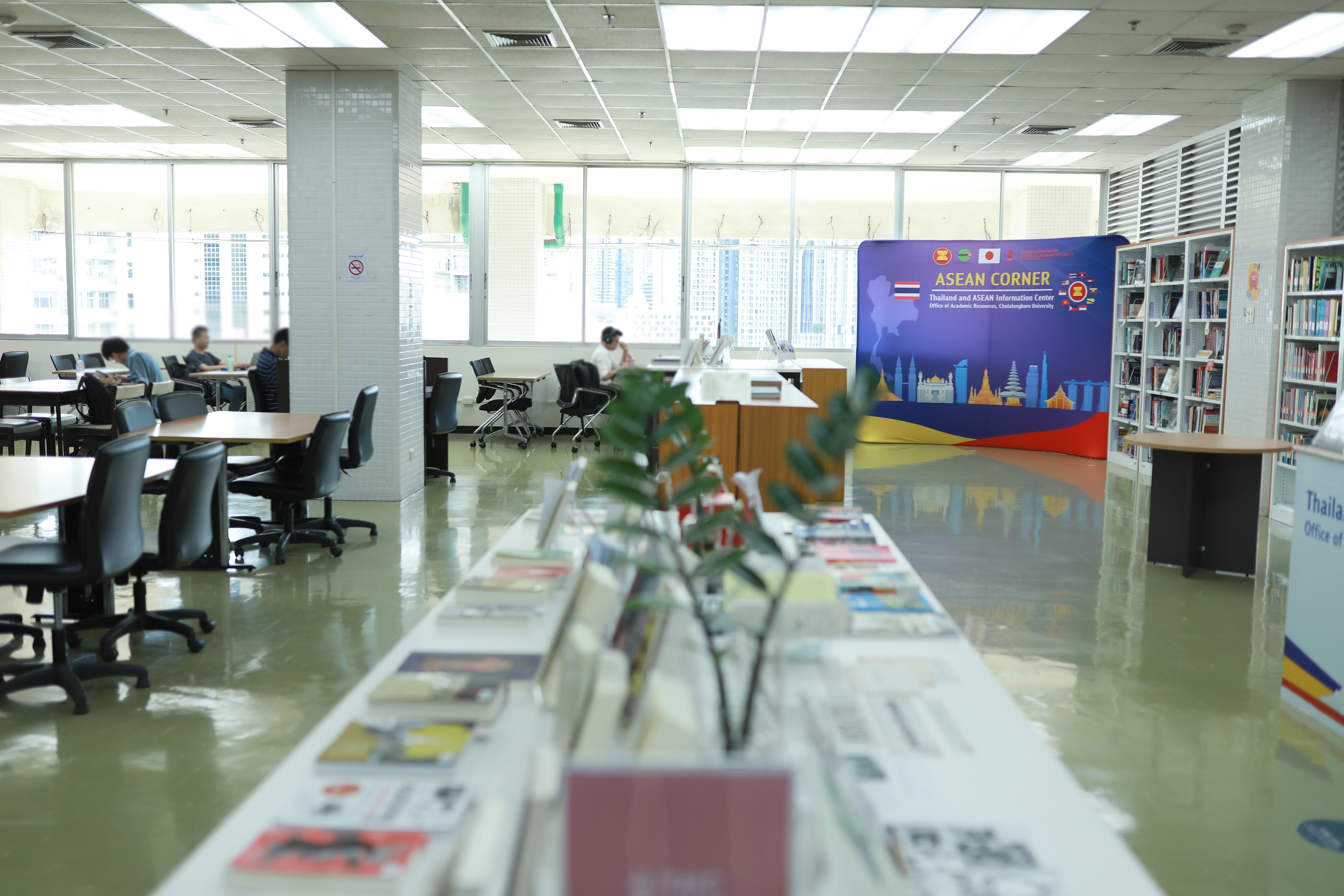
Atmosphere of the library and the first reading room inside the Thailand and ASEAN Information Center (TAIC), 6th floor, Office of Academic Resources, Chulalongkorn University, Phayathai Road, Bangkok.

The Thailand and ASEAN Information Center (TAIC) is a special library located on the 6th floor of the Office of Academic Resources, Chulalongkorn University in Bangkok, Thailand. The center provides in-depth information about Thailand and Southeast Asian countries, focusing on the social and behavioral sciences. Resources are available in both Thai and English and include rare and valuable books from Chulalongkorn University’s collection. The library holds more than 140,000 items.

The Thailand and ASEAN Information Center (TAIC) was originally known as the Thailand Information Center (TIC). It was initially established through a collaboration between the Military Development and Research Center (MDRC) of the Supreme Command Headquarters, the Research and Development Center of Thailand (RDC-T), and the Advanced Research Projects Agency (ARPA) of the U.S. Department of Defense.

The Thailand Information Center was established on January 1, 1968 and was then operated by The Battelle Memorial Institute - Columbus Laboratories under a contract with ARPA. It served as an important resource center providing information on Thailand, with a focus on behavioral sciences, social sciences, and related fields. Its primary users included personnel from MDRC and RDC-T, government officials from both Thailand and the United States, as well as independent researchers and researchers from various organizations working on security and development issues concerning Thailand.

In 1971, ARPA prepared to cease its operations in Thailand, which meant that the Thailand Information Center, as part of ARPA, also had to discontinue its activities. However, with a valuable collection of over 20,000 information resources that could greatly benefit education and research in Thailand, Chulalongkorn University expressed its intention to take over the center's operations. The transfer was subsequently approved by a representative from the United States.

The Thailand Information Center was officially transferred to Chulalongkorn University on December 30, 1971. It officially opened on March 26, 1972, on the first floor of Building Three of the Faculty of Political Science at Chulalongkorn University.

On April 1, 1982, the Thailand Information Center was relocated to the Mahathirajanusorn Building, now known as the Office of Academic Resources, where it became part of this office under the Royal Decree on the Establishment of the Center of Academic Resources (CAR), Chulalongkorn University. The integration brought together three key units: the Central Library, the Thailand Information Center, and the Central Audiovisual Center. The center officially opened to the public on June 14, 1982.

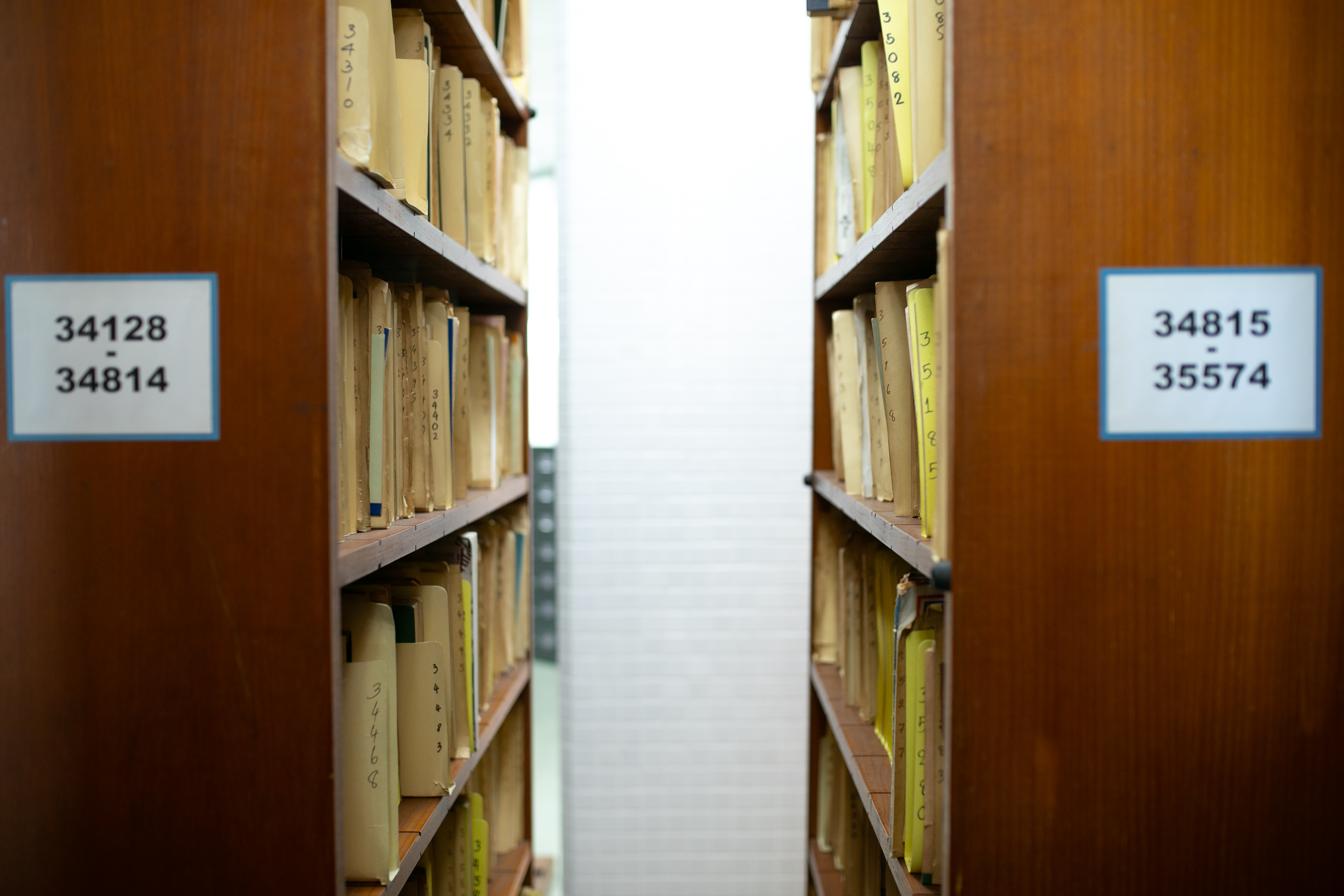
The Thailand and ASEAN Information Center houses a collection of books, research reports, conference proceedings, and limited-distribution publications (Grey Literature) on topics related to social sciences, politics, economics, society, security, culture, history, ethnicity, and national development. The materials primarily focus on Thailand and Southeast Asian countries, covering the period from the post-Cold War era in the 1960s to the present.

The Thailand and ASEAN Information Center functions as a specialized library, offering a wide range of information services and resources. It focuses on library-related activities and the dissemination of social science information relevant to Thailand and the ASEAN community. The center provides access to diverse formats of documents and data, including:

== Thailand and ASEAN Information ==
The Thailand and ASEAN Information collection consists of approximately 100,000 titles, including books, research reports, conference proceedings, and limited-distribution publications (Grey Literature). These materials cover topics such as social sciences, politics, economics, society, security, culture, history, ethnicity, and national development, with a focus on Thailand and Southeast Asian countries from the post-Cold War period in the 1960s (B.E. 2500) to the present.

The center has developed a specialized database of this information, including abstracts and an English-language search index. The documents are organized using a document numbering system. Currently, the center has digitized valuable post-Cold War resources inherited from the Advanced Research Projects Agency (ARPA), along with documents related to displaced persons in Thailand from the 1970s collected by The Committee for Coordination of Services to Displaced Persons in Thailand (CCSDPT). These resources are now available in a digital collection offering free access.

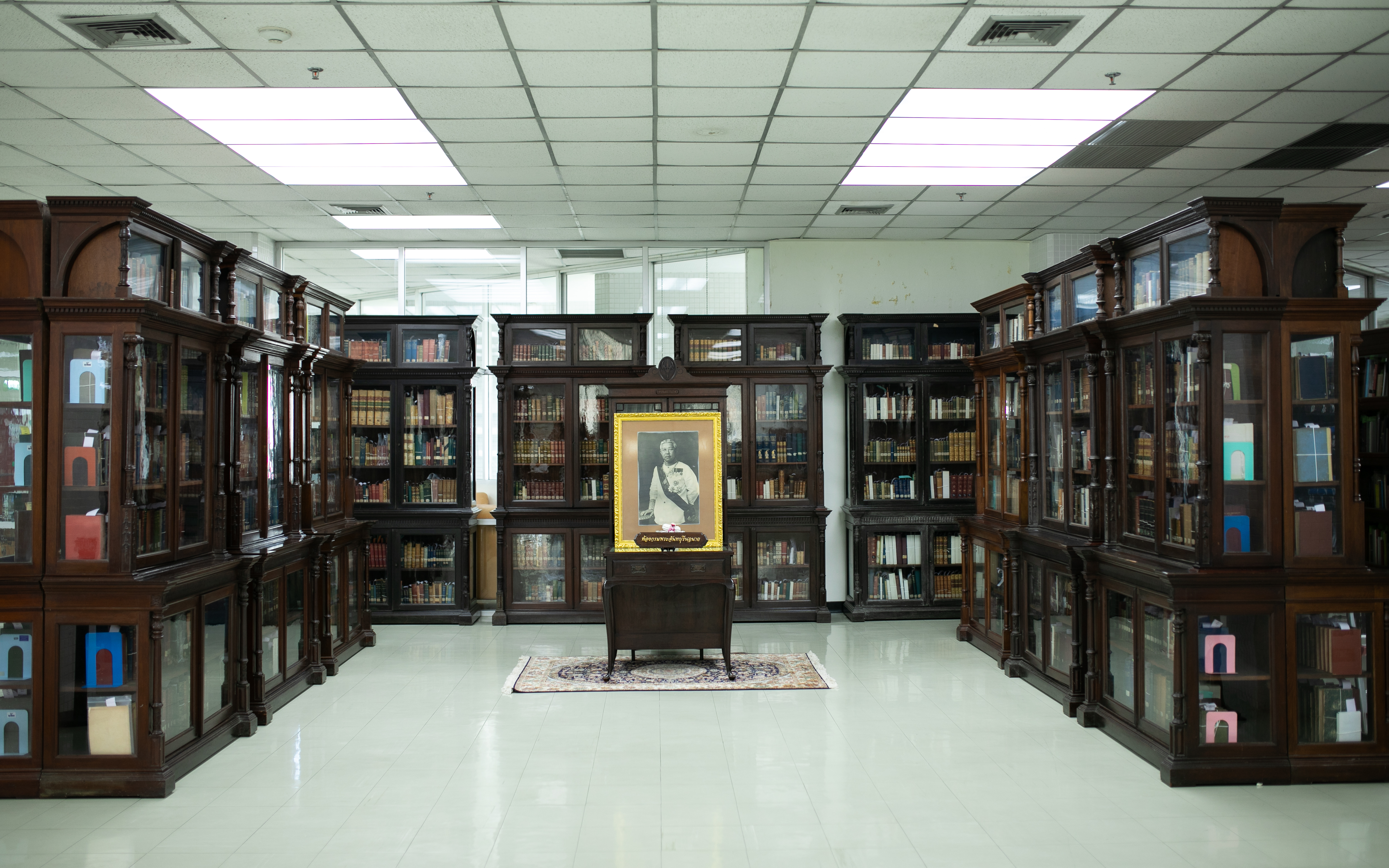
An image of the Rare Book Cabinet, which holds the personal book collection of Kitiyakara Voralaksana, 1st Prince of Chanthaburi . This collection is housed in the Rare Book Room of the Thailand and ASEAN Information Center on the 6th floor of the Office of Academic Resources, Chulalongkorn University.

== Rare Books Collection ==
The Rare Books Collection comprises old and rare books with special attributes, significant publication histories, and aesthetically crafted formats representative of their era. These books serve as primary educational resources and often have notable provenance, having been previously owned, gifted, or donated by royalty or prominent figures. The center holds more than 20,000 rare book items, including:

- Valuable Books of Chulalongkorn University
- Prince Kitiyakara Voralaksana's Collection
- Prince Dhani Nivat's Collection
- Wongsa Dhiraj Snid's Permanent Exhibition
- Original Manuscripts and Thai Traditional Books
- The first issue of the Royal Gazette up to B.E. 2487 (1944)
- Special occasion books
- Funeral books of historically significant figures or those containing content crucial to Thai history
- Royal Writings of His Majesty King Chulalongkorn (Rama V)
- Royal Writings of His Majesty King Vajiravudh (Rama VI)
- Royal Writings by His Majesty King Bhumibol Adulyadej (Rama IX), Royal Writings by Her Royal Highness Princess Maha Chakri Sirindhorn, Publications related to King Rama IX Royal literary works by members of the royal family connected to Chulalongkorn University
- L'Illustration & Le Petit Journal published in 1893 and 1897
- Tipitaka Siam-Rath Edition (Online Version)

== Indian Corner ==
The Chulaphraratkadee Corner was established through collaboration between the Indian Studies Center of Chulalongkorn University and the Embassy of India in Thailand to honor Her Royal Highness Princess Maha Chakri Sirindhorn on the occasion of her 60th birthday on April 2, 2015. The corner offers information resources on India in three academic disciplines: humanities, fine arts, and social sciences, in both Thai and English. Some of these resources are rare and have not been published in Thailand.

== Taiwan Resource Center for Chinese Studies ==
The Taiwan Resource Center for Chinese Studies (TRCCS) provides access to Chinese-language information resources. The collection ranges from manuscript replicas of rare Chinese books to modern publications. It also offers access to the digital resource repository of the National Central Library of Taiwan (NCL) and various electronic databases provided by leading Taiwanese institutions.

== Digital Resources ==
The center is instrumental in the establishment of Chula DigiVerse, an open-access digital repository. It also focuses on developing a digital preservation system to ensure the long-term viability of digital assets. The collection comprises digitized papers on social sciences and development in Thailand and other Southeast Asian countries from the 1960s, following World War II.

The center also houses the King Chulalongkorn Digital Archives, a digital repository and online display that honors the legacy of King Chulalongkorn (Rama V) and King Vajiravudh (Rama VI), showcasing their contributions to Chulalongkorn University and Thailand. The archives include royal biographies, duties, and literary works. It also offers digitized collections of rare images, books, theses, studies, and other publications about both monarchs.
