= Thaworn =

Thaworn (Thai: ถาวร, pronounced [tʰǎː.wɔ̄ːn]; from Pali: Thāvara) is a masculine given name. Notable people with the name include:

- Thaworn Senniam (born 1947), Thai politician
- Thaworn Wiratchant (born 1966), Thai professional golfer
