= Suthee Singhasaneh =

Thai politician

Suthee Singhasaneh (Thai: สุธี สิงห์เสน่ห์; RTGS: Suthi Singsane; 22 July 1928 – 3 August 2013) was a Thai politician. He was a Senator, MP, and the Minister of Finance (1986–1988, 1991–1992).

Singhasaneh died on August 3, 2013, at the age of 85.
