= Pao Pienlert Boripanyutakit =

Thai politician (1893–1970)

- เภา เพียรเลิศ บริภัณฑ์ยุทธกิจ
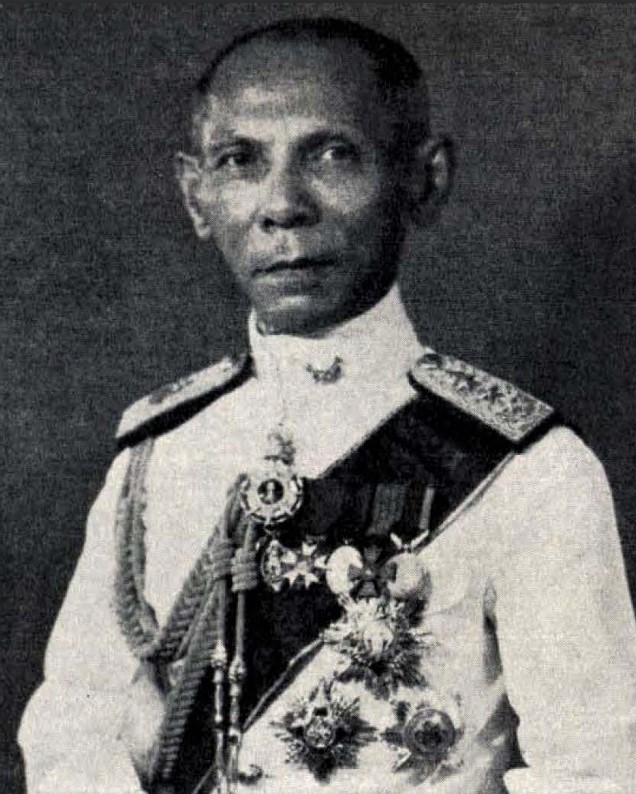

Minister of Commerce/Economic Affairs
- In office February 12, 1935 – February 16, 1942
- Prime Minister: Plaek Phibunsongkhram
- Preceded by: Phraya Sorayuthaseni
- Succeeded by: Sin Kamolnawin
- In office May 29, 1948 – November 29, 1951
- Prime Minister: Plaek Phibunsongkhram
- Preceded by: Phraya Mahaisawan
- Succeeded by: Munee Mahasantana Vejayantarungsarit
- In office March 31, 1957 – September 16, 1957
- Prime Minister: Plaek Phibunsongkhram
- Preceded by: Siri Siriyothin
- Succeeded by: Sukich Nimmanheminda

Minister of Finance
- In office December 17, 1941 – August 1, 1944
- Prime Minister: Plaek Phibunsongkhram
- Preceded by: Pridi Banomyong
- Succeeded by: Khuang Aphaiwong
- In office December 8, 1951 – March 30, 1953
- Prime Minister: Plaek Phibunsongkhram
- Preceded by: Luang Wichitwathakan
- Succeeded by: Boonkerd Sutantanon

Minister of Agriculture
- In office November 29, 1951 – December 6, 1951
- Prime Minister: Plaek Phibunsongkhram
- Preceded by: Chuangkasetsinlapakan
- Succeeded by: Prayoon Yuthasastrkosol

Personal details
- Born: 10 November 1893 Thonburi (now Bangkok), Thailand
- Died: 4 March 1970 (aged 76) Bangkok, Thailand

General Pao Pienlert Boripanyutakit (Thai: เภา เพียรเลิศ บริภัณฑ์ยุทธกิจ; November 10, 1893 – March 4, 1970) was a Thai political figure who served as a Minister of Finance and Minister of Commerce.

== Biography ==
Pao was the second oldest of 12 children. He lived and studied in military school in Thailand until the age of 16 at which time he went abroad to continue military study on full scholarship. He first studied in Germany until World War I broke out, after which he was transferred to Switzerland and later to Paris when Thailand participated in World War I at École spéciale militaire de Saint-Cyr to complete his education. He also served as an assistant to the Defence Attaché at the embassy in Paris during his study and after graduation.

He returned to Thailand at the age of 28 and served as an army official until the King granted his official title as Phra Boripanyutakit at the age of 36. He was named one of the 19 highest-ranking officials in his nation's army, serving as a liaison between the Thai Army and the Allies force during World War I. He spoke fluent French, German, and English.

He served as the Minister of Commerce for 8 terms (February 12, 1935 to February 16, 1942, from May 29, 1948 to November 29, 1951, and again from March 31, 1957 to September 16, 1957).

He served as the Minister of Finance for two different terms, from December 17, 1941 – August 1, 1944 and December 8, 1951 – March 30, 1953.

He also served for a very brief period as Minister of Agriculture in 1951 in the aftermath of the Silent Coup.

His most notable contribution to finance was that he helped established the foreign currency exchange of Thailand in 1955. In commerce, he helped industrialize the enamelling process for porcelain and metals commercially, started the export program for the rice industry in Thailand, and helped to create the first seaport in Thailand.

== Honours ==
Pao received the following royal decorations in the Honours System of Thailand:

- Knight Grand Cordon of the Order of the White Elephant
- Knight Grand Cordon of the Order of the Crown of Thailand
- Knight Grand Commander of the Order of Chula Chom Klao
- Companion of the Order of Rama
- War Medal of B.E. 2461
- Safeguarding the Constitution Medal
- Dushdi Mala Medal Pin of Arts and Science (Military)
- Medal for Service Rendered in the Interior - Franco-Thai War
- Chakra Mala Medal
- King Rama IX Royal Cypher Medal, 2nd Class
- King Rama VII Coronation Medal
- King Rama IX Coronation Medal
- Chai Medal (World War I Victory Medal)
- 150 Years Commemoration of Bangkok Medal

=== Foreign Honours ===
- France :
  - Knight of the Legion of Honour
  - War Cross (1914–1918)
- Nazi Germany :
  - Grand Cross of the Order of the German Eagle with star
- Japan :
  - Order of the Sacred Treasure, First Class

Political offices
Preceded by Phraya Sorayutthaseni	Minister of Economics; 1935–1941	Succeeded by Himself as Minister of Economy
Preceded by Himself as Minister of Economics	Minister of Economy; 1941–1942	Succeeded by Luang Sinthusongkhramchai
Preceded by Luang Praditmanutham	Minister of Finance; 1941–1944	Succeeded by Khuang Aphaiwong
Preceded by Phraya Mahaisawan	Minister of Commerce; 1948–1951	Succeeded by Munee Mahasanthana Vejayantarungsarit
Preceded by Phra Chuangkasetsinlapakan	Minister of Agriculture; 1951	Succeeded by Luang Yuthasastr Kosol
Preceded by Luang Wichitwathakan	Minister of Finance; 1951–1957	Succeeded by Nai Worakanbancha
Preceded by Siri Siriyothin	Minister of Economics; 1957	Succeeded by Sukich Nimmanheminda
Assembly seats
Preceded by Chat Sriyanon; Channothai Rieksut; Chintasen Chaiyakam; Bhethai Amatayakul; Chot Kunakasem	Members of the House of Representatives for Phra Nakhon; 1957–1958 with Plaek Phibunsongkhram; Khuang Aphaiwong; Munee Mahasanthana Vejayantarungsarit; Banyat Devahastin na Ayudhya; Phra Prayutchonlathi; Phraya Ladphlithammaprakal; Mangkorn Phromyothi; Luang Sawasdisorayut; Luang Angkananurak; Chalit Kulkamthon; Thawin Rawangphai; Sombun Sirithon; Luang Supachalasai; Luang Srisaliphit; Chit Munsilpa Sinadyodharaksa; Chaen Patchusanon; Luang Nora-atbancha; Lek Nana; Sawas Sumalyasak; Natthawut Sutthisongkram; Kasem Bunsri; Kamol Chanthornsorn; Luang Prakobnitisarn	Vacant Title next held by Seni Pramoj; Lek Nana; Kasem Bunsri; Sombun Sirithon; Thammanoon Thien-ngern; Pracha Buranathanit; Sira Patthamakom; Sanah Raktham; Bhichai Rattakul; Surat Osathanugrah; Sawas Sumalyasak; Damrong Latthaphiphat; Phan Premmani; Natthawut Sutthisongkram; Busarin Phakdikul
Academic offices
Preceded by Phra Chuangkasetsinlapakan	President of the Kasetsart University Council; 1951	Succeeded by Luang Yuthasastr Kosol
