= Ministry of Finance (Thailand) =

Government ministry of Thailand

- กระทรวงการคลัง
- "The Seal of the Bird of Paradise" used as the Ministry's seal

- "The Flag of the Bird of Paradise" used as the Ministry's flag

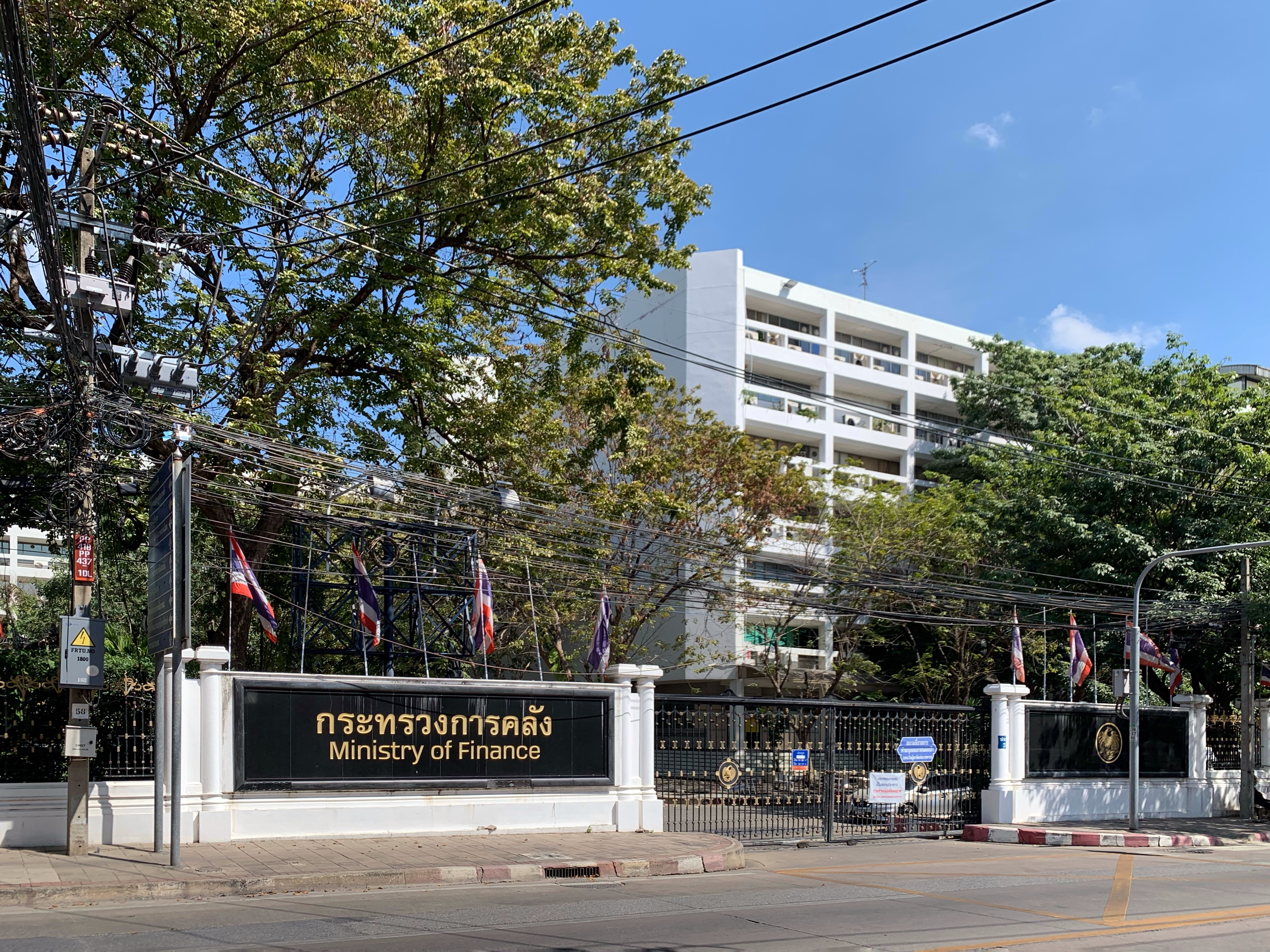
- Ministry of Finance

Ministry overview
- Formed: 14 April 1875; 151 years ago
- Preceding agencies: Ministry of Treasury; Department of Treasury
- Jurisdiction: Government of Thailand
- Headquarters: Phaya Thai, Bangkok
- Annual budget: 242,948M baht (FY2019)
- Minister responsible: Ekniti Nitithanprapas, Minister
- Ministry executive: Lavaron Sangsnit, Permanent
- Website: https://www.mof.go.th/th/home

Footnotes
- https://twitter.com/mofthailand, In Twitter

The Ministry of Finance (Abrv: MOF; Thai: กระทรวงการคลัง, RTGS: Krasuang Kan Khlang) is a cabinet ministry in the Government of Thailand.

Considered one of the country's most important ministries, the Ministry of Finance has numerous responsibilities over public finance, taxation, the treasury, government properties, the operations of government monopolies, and revenue-generating enterprises. The ministry is also vested with the power to provide loan guarantees for governmental agencies, financial institutions, and state enterprises.

== Management and budget ==
The head of the ministry is the Minister of Finance (Thai: รัฐมนตรีกระทรวงการคลัง). He is a member of the Cabinet of Thailand and is therefore appointed by the King of Thailand on the advice of the Prime Minister. As of 2020, the Minister of Finance is Mr Apisak Tantivorawong. The MOF permanent secretary is Prasong Poontaneat.

The MOF was allocated 242,948 million baht in the FY2019 budget.

== History ==
The ministry has existed in its current form since the 15th century during the Ayutthaya Kingdom. Then, the ministry was called the "Kromma Khlang" (Thai: กรมคลัง, Literally: Finance Department), finally upgraded to “Krom Phra Khlang” (Thai: กรมพระคลัง, sometimes written as "Berguelang" or "Barcelon" by foreign authors). The "Phra Khlang" or minister responsible had wide-ranging powers, including those related to taxation, trade, monopolies, tributes, and even foreign affairs.

Most of these features were retained during the Rattanakosin era. In 1855, King Mongkut signed the Bowring Treaty with the United Kingdom. The treaty exposed Siam to modern trade and international commerce; the king was compelled to set customs duty rates at no more than three percent; although the country was at a disadvantage, international trade grew, nonetheless. Soon, the king was forced to establish a Customs House (Thai: ศุลกสถาน) and the Royal Thai Mint to address new challenges.

During the reign of King Chulalongkorn (Rama V), the ministry took its present form. The king issued a royal decree in 1875 consolidating all powers and agencies under one ministry with a more focused portfolio. He appointed one of his uncles, Prince Maha Mala, as the first Minister of Finance. The ministry formally came into its own in 1933 with the Civil Service Reform Act of 1933. The Royal Treasury Ministry was subsequently renamed to the Ministry of Finance, which now comprises 10 departments and 14 state-owned enterprises.

The MOF played a key role in the COVID-19 pandemic in Thailand as it was responsible for disbursing aid to needy citizens.

== List of ministers ==
This is a list of ministers of finance of Thailand:

- 1873–1886: Prince Mahamala
- 1886–1892: Prince Chaturonrasmi
- 1892–1894: Prince Narisara Nuwattiwong
- 1894–1896: Prince Srisiddhi Thongjaya
- 1896–1906: Prince Jayanta Mongkol
- 1906–1907: Praya Suriyanuvat (Koed Bunnag)
- 1907: Prince Kitiyakara Voralaksana
- 1908–1922: Prince Kitiyakara Voralaksana
- 1922–1929: Prince Suphayok Kasem
- 1929–1932: Praya Komankunramontri (Chern Komankun of Nakorn)
- 1932: Prince Suphayok Kasem
- 1932–1933: Praya Manopakorn Nititada
- 1933–1934: Choapraya Srithammathibet (Jit Srithammathibet of Songkra)
- 1934–1935: Praya Manavarahchasevi (Prot Vichien of Songkra)
- 1935–1936: Praya Phahonphonphayuhasena
- 1936–1938: Praya Chaiyotsombat (Serm Kritsanamara)
- 1938–1941: Pridi Banomyong
- 1941–1944: Pao Pienlert Boripanyutakit
- 1944–1945: Khuang Aphaiwong
- 1945: Leng Srisomwong
- 1945–1946: Direk Jayanama
- 1946: Praya Srivisaravaja (Tienlieng Huntakun)
- 1946: Pridi Banomyong
- 1946–1947: Vijitr Luritanon
- 1947–1948: Prince Vivadhanajaya
- 1948: Praya Tonavanikmontri (Visut Tonavanik)
- 1948–1949: Prince Vivadhanajaya
- 1949–1950: Plaek Phibunsongkhram
- 1950–1951: Pramanupanavimonsart (Chom Jamornman)
- 1951: Luang Wichitwathakan
- 1951–1953: Pao Pienlert Boripanyutakit
- 1953: Varakarnbanch (Boonkert Sutantanon)
- 1953: Pote Sarasin
- 1955: Chort Kunakasem
- 1957–1958: Serm Vinicchayakul
- 1959–1965: Sunthorn Hongladarom
- 1965–1973: Serm Vinicchayakul
- 1973–1974: Boonma Wongsawan
- 1974–1975: Sommai Huntakul
- 1975: Savetr Piempongsan
- 1975–1976: Boonchu Rojanasathien
- 1976: Savetr Piempongsan
- 1976–1979: Supat Suthatham
- 1979–1980: Kriangsak Chamanan
- 1980: Sommai Huntakul
- 1980–1981: Amnuay Veeravan
- 1981–1986: Sommai Huntakul
- 1986–1988: Suthee Singhasaneh
- 1988–1990: Pramuan Saphawasu
- 1990: Veerapong Ramangkul
- 1990–1991: Banharn Silpa-Archa
- 1991–1992: Suthee Singhasaneh
- 1992: Panat Simasathien
- 1992–1995: Tarrin Nimmanahaeminda
- 1995–1996: Surakiart Sathirathai
- 1996: Bodee Junnanon
- 1996: Chaiwat Wiboonsawat
- 1996–1997: Amnuay Veeravan
- 1997: Kosit Panpiemras
- 1997: Thanong Bidaya
- 1997–2001: Tarrin Nimmanahaeminda
- 2001–2003: Somkid Jatusripitak
- 2003–2004: Suchart Chaovisith
- 2003–2005: Somkid Jatusripitak
- 2005–2006: Thanong Bidaya
- 2006–2007: Pridiyathorn Devakula
- 2007–2008: Chalongphob Sussangkarn
- 2008: Surapong Suebwonglee
- 2008: Suchart Thada-Thamrongvech
- 2008–2011: Korn Chatikavanij
- 2011–2012: Thirachai Phuvanatnaranubala
- 2012–2014: Kittiratt Na-Ranong
- 2014–2015: Sommai Phasee
- 2015–2019: Apisak Tantivorawong
- 2019–2020: Uttama Savanayana
- 2020: Predee Daochai
- 2020–2023: Arkhom Termpittayapaisith
- 2023–2024: Srettha Thavisin
- 2024–2025 Pichai Chunhavajira
- 2025–Present Ekniti Nitithanprapas

== Departments ==
=== Government agencies ===
- Office of the Secretary to the Minister (Thai: สำนักงานรัฐมนตรี)
- Office of the Permanent Secretary (Thai: สำนักงานปลัดกระทรวงการคลัง)
- The Revenue Department (Thai: กรมสรรพากร): During the reign of King Rama V, the Revenue Department was organised as two separate departments: the External Revenue Department and the Internal Revenue Department. The External Revenue Department was responsible for collecting taxes and duties outside Bangkok and was under the Royal Treasury Ministry, which is now the Ministry of Finance. Due to personnel shortages, district and sub-district chief officers were assigned to collect taxes and duties, and the department was subsequently brought under the Ministry of Interior. The Internal Revenue Department was responsible for the collection of taxes and duties within greater Bangkok (including areas in Pathum Thani, Nonthaburi, and Samut Prakan and was under the Ministry of Metropolis. This department was established following the advice of Mr. W. A. Graham, who was the comptroller of the Ministry of Metropolis at the time. The two departments were finally combined and named the Revenue Department. It was established on 2 September 1915. The Revenue Department collects, administers, and develops six types of taxes: personal income tax, corporate income tax, value-added tax, specific business tax, stamp duties, and petroleum income tax. These taxes combined account for more than 80 percent of total government revenue. The department operates 12 regional revenue offices, 119 area revenue offices, and 850 area revenue branch offices throughout the country, as well as 14 bureaus at its headquarters. The department collaborates with international organizations, including the International Monetary Fund, the World Bank, and the International Bureau of Fiscal Documentation, to ensure international best practices for tax administration and policies.
- The Fiscal Policy Office (Thai: สำนักงานเศรษฐกิจการคลัง)
- The Treasury Department (Thai: กรมธนารักษ์)
- The Comptroller General Department (Thai: กรมบัญชีกลาง)
- The Customs Department (Thai: กรมศุลกากร)
- The Excise Department (Thai: กรมสรรพสามิต)
- The Public Debt Management Office (Thai: สำนักงานบริหารหนี้สาธารณะ)
- The State Enterprise Policy Office (SEPO) (Thai: สำนักงานคณะกรรมการนโยบายรัฐวิสาหกิจ)

=== State enterprises ===
Sources:

- The Government Lottery Office
- Tobacco Authority of Thailand
- Government Savings Bank
- GH Bank
- Krung Thai Bank Public Company Limited
- Bank for Agriculture and Agricultural Co-operatives
- Liquor Distillery Organization (Excise Department)
- Playing Cards Factory (Excise Department)
- Export-Import Bank of Thailand
- Small Business Credit Guarantee Corporation (SBCG)
- Secondary Mortgage Corporation
- Small and Medium Enterprise Development Bank of Thailand (SME Bank)
- Student Loan Fund
- Dhanarak Asset Development Company Limited

=== Public organizations ===
- Neighbouring Countries Economic Development Cooperation Agency (NEDA)

== See also ==
- Economy of Thailand
- Thai baht
- Thai lottery
- Bank of Thailand
- Stock Exchange of Thailand
- Cabinet of Thailand
- List of government ministries of Thailand
- Government of Thailand
