= Suphayok Kasem =

Suphayok Kasem ศุภโยคเกษม
- Prince of Siam
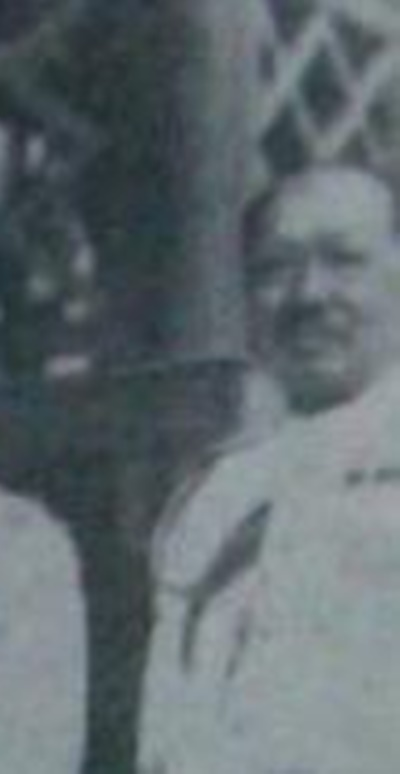
- Born: 29 August 1872; Bangkok, Siam
- Died: 6 January 1933 (aged 60); Bangkok, Siam
- Spouse: Mom Khao Suranandana; Mom Nuam Sekarit; Mom Ping Suranandana
Names
- HH Prince Suphayokasem พระวรวงศ์เธอ พระองค์เจ้าศุภโยคเกษม
- House: Kashemsri family (Chakri Dynasty)
- Father: Kashemsri Subhayok
- Mother: Mom Poem Kashemsri na Ayudhya

Minister of Royal Treasury
- In office 17 January 1922 – 26 October 1929
- Preceded by: Kitiyakara Voralaksana
- Succeeded by: Chin Komarakul Na Nakhon (Phraya Komarakulmontri)
- In office 9 April 1932 – 29 June 1932
- Preceded by: Chin Komarakul Na Nakhon (Phraya Komarakulmontro)
- Succeeded by: Phraya Manopakorn Nititada

Prince Suphayok Kasem (พระวรวงศ์เธอ พระองค์เจ้าศุภโยคเกษม) (29 August 1872 – 1932), formerly known as: Mom Chao Nen Kashemsri (หม่อมเจ้าเณร เกษมศรี), was a son of Prince Kashemsri Subhayok and Mom Poem Kashemsri na Ayudhya, and a former Thai Minister of Finance.

Prince Suphayok-Kasem, formerly known as Mom Chao Naen Kashemsri, was born on 29 August 1872 and studied at Phra Tamnuk Suan Kularb School until he reached the age of 17, whereupon he entered the civil service in the Ministry of Finance, later receiving the rank of Director-General in 1921, alongside being elevated to the rank of 'His Highness' (พระวรวงศ์เธอ พระองค์เจ้า) by the reigning monarch, King Rama VI. He was the only member of the House of Kashemsri with the rank 'His Serene Highness' to be elevated to 'Phra Ong Chao', or His Highness.

Following this, he became the Minister of Finance in 1922, and would continue in office until his resignation from the post in 1929. However, he resumed the position of Minister for a few short months in 1932 before the 1932 Siamese Revolution, when the new revolutionary government removed him from the position five days after the end of the absolute monarchy.

He died 6–7 months later, on 6 January 1933.

== Family ==
Prince Subhayok had three wives according to Siamese custom. Mom Khao, a descendant of King Taksin of Thonburi, was the most senior of the three.

House of Kashemsri (Subhayok's Branch)
- **Prince Subhayok-Kasem**
  - Mom Khao Kashemsri Na Ayudhya (Suranandana)
    - **Mom Rajawongse Prapuj Kashemsri**
    - Mom Rajawongse Prapasiri Kashemsri
    - Mom Rajawongse Sasichom Kashemsri
    - **Mom Rajawongse Chitin Kashemsri** m. Mom Rajawongse Chalerm-Viman Devakula
      - **Mom Luang Chitti-Chalerm Kashemsri** m. Thipa Kashemsri Na Ayudhaya (Perunavin)
        - Chitiyapa Kashemsri Na Ayudhaya m. Thawach Chatchupong
          - Phisira Chatchupong
        - Rujimapas Kashemsri Na Ayudhaya m. Sumit Sara
          - **Supra-Kasem Kashemsri Na Ayudhaya**
          - Natabhorn Kashemsri Na Ayudhaya
        - Nuthaitip Kashemsri Na Ayudhaya
        - Dayadhorn Kashemsri Na Ayudhaya
    - Mom Rajawongse Saengsoam Kashemsri
  - Mom Nuam (Sekarij)
    - Mom Kashemsri Subhavongse¹ (**Mom Rajawongse Kachit Kashemsri**) m. Mom Rajawongse Payungsak Davivongse later m. Chin Thapparangsi
  - Mom Ping (Suranandana)
    - Unnamed Male Mom Rajawongse
    - Unnamed Male Mom Rajawongse

Both of Mom Ping's children are presumed to not have survived infancy
Direct male descendants and successors highlighted in bold.

¹ In this context, Mom (หม่อม) was a feudal title granted to male Mom Rajawongse, ranking above Phra and below Phraya.

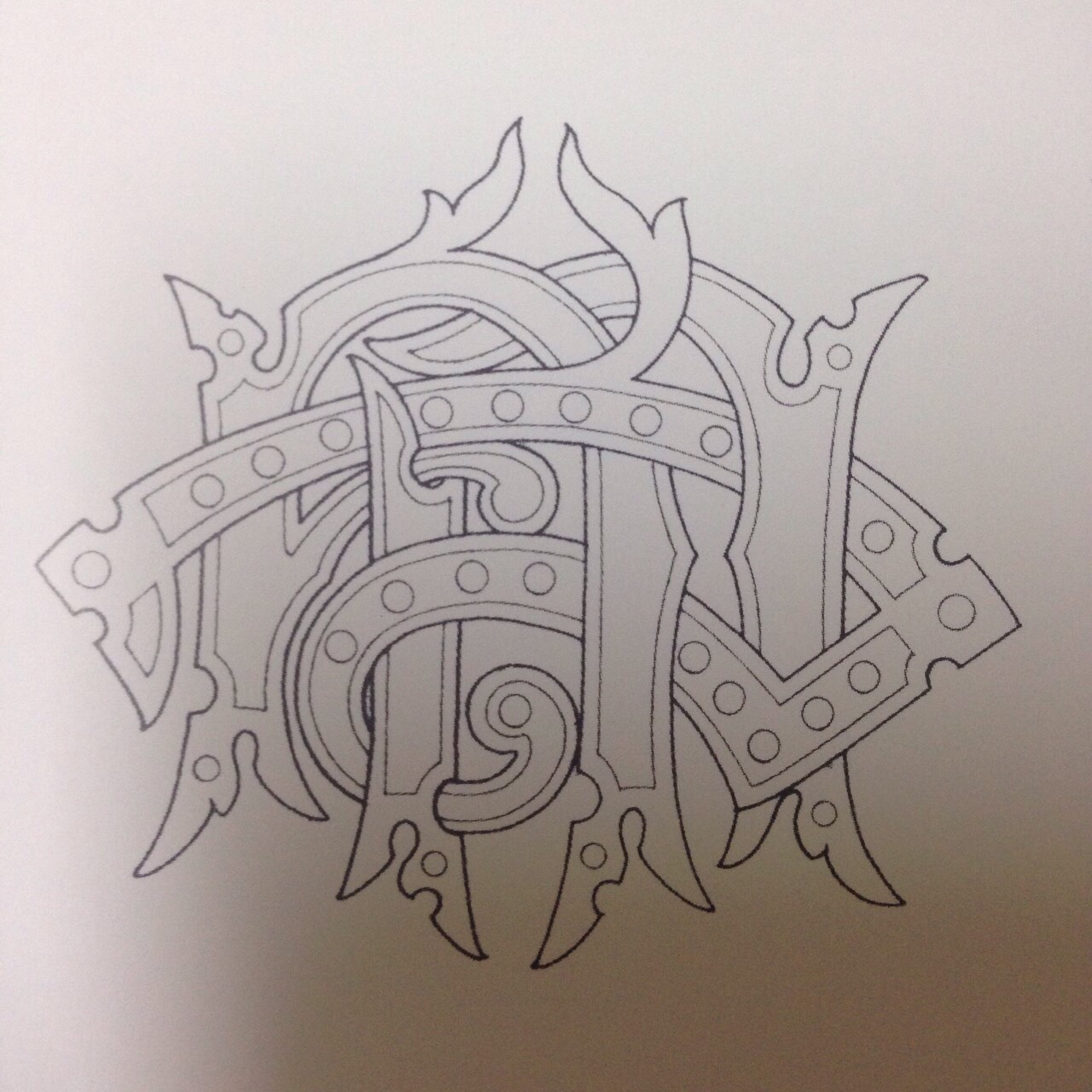
The personal seal of the prince, used in official documents throughout his lifetime.

== Honours ==
- 1921 - Order of Chula Chom Klao - Knight Grand Cross (First Class) (ป.จ.)
- 1925 - Order of the White Elephant - Knight Grand Cordon (Special Class) (ม.ป.ช)
- 1913 - Order of the Crown of Thailand - Knight Grand Cross (First Class)
- 1921 - King Rama VI Royal Cypher Medal
- 1927 - King Rama VII Royal Cypher Medal

=== Foreign Decorations ===
- Italy : 1915 – Order of the Crown of Italy - Knight Grand Cross
