= Luang Wichitwathakan =

Thai politician, historian and author

- วิจิตรวาทการ
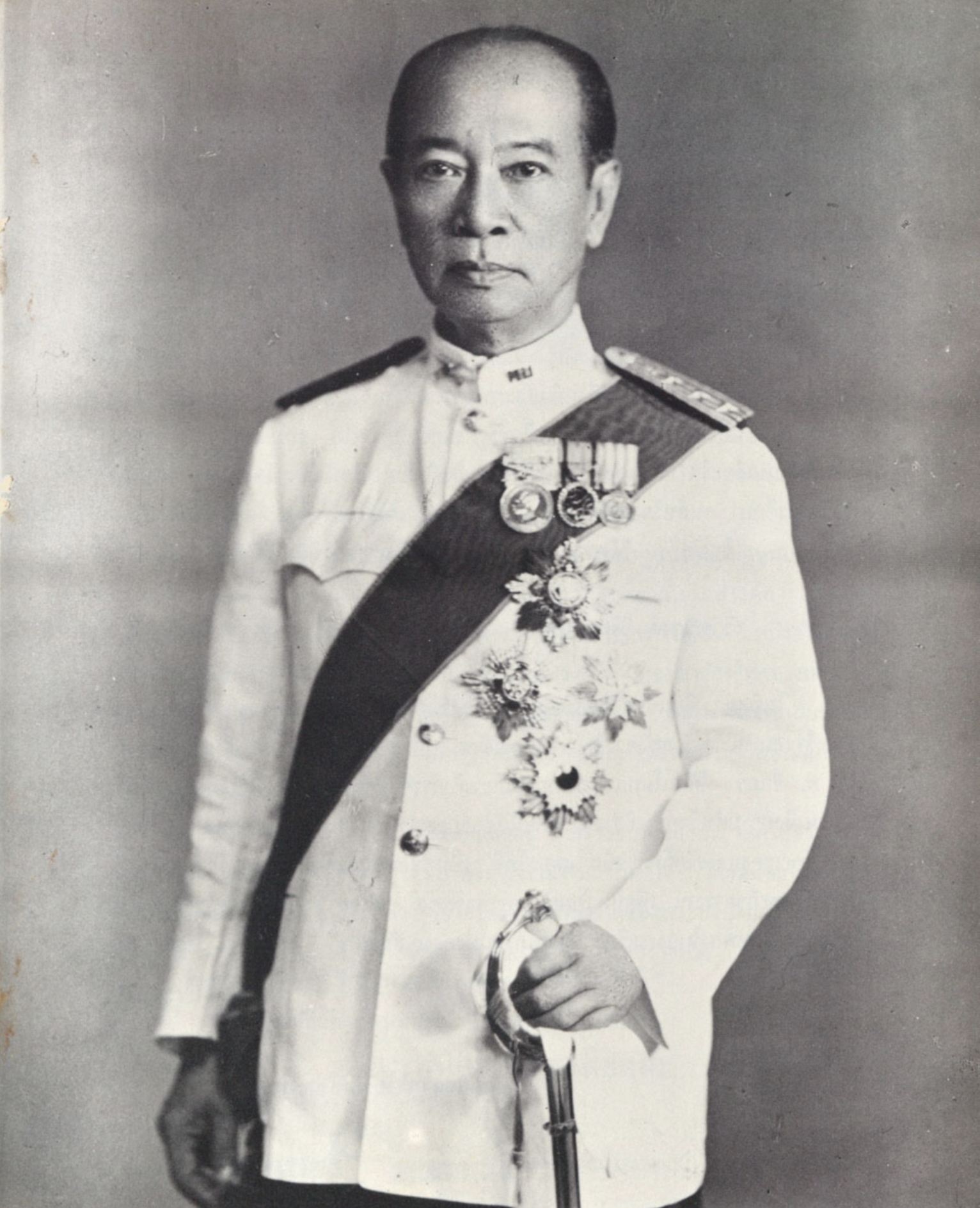

Assistant to the Prime Minister
- In office 16 February 1959 – 31 March 1962
- Prime Minister: Sarit Thanarat
- Preceded by: Position established
- Succeeded by: Position abolished

Secretary-General of the National Security Council
- In office 16 February 1959 – 31 March 1962
- Prime Minister: Sarit Thanarat
- Preceded by: Position established
- Succeeded by: Phraya Srivisanvaja

Minister of Economic Affairs
- In office 6 December 1951 – 23 March 1952
- Prime Minister: Plaek Phibunsongkhram
- Preceded by: Munee Mahasandana
- Succeeded by: Bunkoed Sutantanon

Minister of Finance
- In office 29 November 1951 – 8 December 1951
- Prime Minister: Plaek Phibunsongkhram
- Preceded by: Phra Manuphanawimonsart
- Succeeded by: Pao Pienlert Boripanyutakit

Minister of Foreign Affairs
- In office 19 June 1942 – 18 October 1943
- Prime Minister: Plaek Phibunsongkhram
- Preceded by: Plaek Phibunsongkhram
- Succeeded by: Direk Jayanama

Personal details
- Born: 11 August 1898 Uthai Thani, Siam
- Died: 31 March 1962 (aged 63) Bangkok, Thailand
- Spouses: Lucienne Laffitte; Praphapan Wichitwathakan
- Profession: Politician; diplomat; historian; novelist; playwright

Major-General Luang Wichitwathakan, also known as just Wichit Wichitwathakan (Thai: หลวงวิจิตรวาทการ, วิจิตร วิจิตรวาทการ; Chinese: 金良; 11 August 1898 – 31 March 1962) was a Thai politician, diplomat, historian, novelist, and playwright. He is credited with changing the name of the country from Siam to Thailand.

Luang Wichitwathakan was prominently engaged in politics and the modernization of Thailand and was in his time the most important figure in the establishment of Thai nationalism and Thai identity. He was the chief ideologue and creator of cultural campaigns during the pre-World War II military rule of Field Marshal Plaek Phibunsongkhram.

== Early life ==
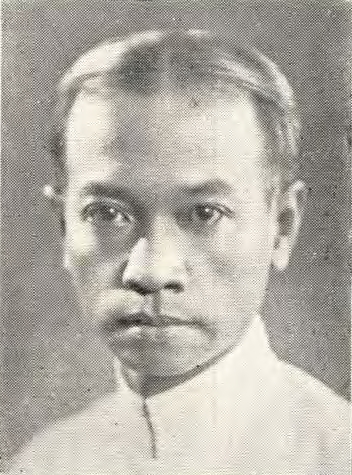
Wichitwathakan before 1959

Wichitwathakan was born Kim Liang (Chinese: 金良), the son of a merchant in Uthai Thani province. According to a cousin, Wichitwathakan's paternal grandfather was Chinese.

He received his primary education in a Buddhist temple school in Uthai Thani and continued the Buddhist education at Wat Mahathat in Bangkok where he excelled in Buddhist studies, graduating first in the kingdom. As a result, he received the certificate from King Vajiravudh.

While still a monk in Wat Mahatat, Wichitwathakan's extensive writings were circulated among the monks. The papers were written in English, French, or German and were sometimes inflammatory regarding temple rules and regulations. The abbot put a stop to it by prohibiting the use of Western languages.

At the age of 20, Wichitwathakan left the monkhood and joined the Ministry of Foreign Affairs as a junior clerk in 1918.

=== Service in France ===
In 1921, Wichitwathakan was posted to the Royal Siamese Legation (equivalent to present-day embassy) in Paris, as Third Secretary. During his five years in Europe, Wichitwathakan served as a member of the Siamese delegation that attended and participated in deliberations of the League of Nations in Geneva. He also studied law and political science at the University of Paris. It was in Paris that he developed close friendships with the future revolutionaries, Pridi Phanomyong, also studying Law at Sorbonne, and Plaek Pibulsongkram, a military officer studying artillery in France.

=== Marriages ===
While in Paris, Wichitwathakan took French lessons from Lucienne Laffitte (née Guillaume), a cultivated French lady who was well-read and musically gifted. They subsequently married and together returned to Siam in 1927. While Wichitwathakan continued to work at the Ministry of Foreign Affairs, Madame Lucienne collaborated with him in several of his important historical publications, notably Prawatsart Sakon (Universal History). Despite this creative partnership and the births of a son and a daughter, the marriage dissolved six years later and Madame Lucienne returned to France with her two children. Luang Wichitwathakan subsequently married Prapapan Raphiphan, a teacher of history and daughter of Khun Vorasarndarunkit who was in charge of education in northern Siam under King Rama V.

== Revolutionary role ==
Personal seal of Luang Wichitwathakan

When Pridi Phanomyong started the clandestine party called Khana Ratsadon (People's Party), he consulted with Thai friends in Paris, namely Field Marshal Pibulsongkram, Wichitwathakan, Prayoon Pamornmontri, and Thatsanai Mitraphakdi. Pridi specifically asked Wichitwathakan to join this secret association, whose purpose was to overthrow the absolute monarchy. Wichitwathakan at this point still maintained loyalty to King Prajadhipok and was in favor of a conciliatory approach with the monarchy. Concerned about the socialistic and communistic ideology of Pridi, Wichitwathakan formed a royalist and free enterprise party called Kana Chart (National Party) while continuing to attend the clandestine meetings of the Khana Ratsadon Party.

After his return to Siam, Wichitwathakan met again with Pridi and Pibulsongkram, but did not participate in the revolution against King Prajadhipok in 1932.

When King Prajadhipok indicated his willingness to support the armed royalist challenge to the People's Party and gave his blessing to Prince Bovoradej to mobilize his soldiers and attack Bangkok in 1933, Wichitwathakan forsook his loyalty to the king to align himself with the representative government as a member of the national assembly.

Wichitwathakan was chairman of the committee which proposed changing the country's name from Siam to Thailand at the state convention in 1939. He led an irredentist campaign after being presented a map produced by Ecole Francaise d'Extreme Orient showing the Thai race inhabiting the areas of Siam, Burma, and southern China. Wichitwathakan estimated from this map that there were approximately 60 million Thais inhabiting the lands of southern China and Southeast Asia, and through his personal crusade as both a historian and a politician, as well as chairman of the parliamentary committee in charge of making the name change, succeeded in changing the name of the country from Siam to Thailand when the state convention ratified the committee's proposal in 1939.

== Wartime service ==
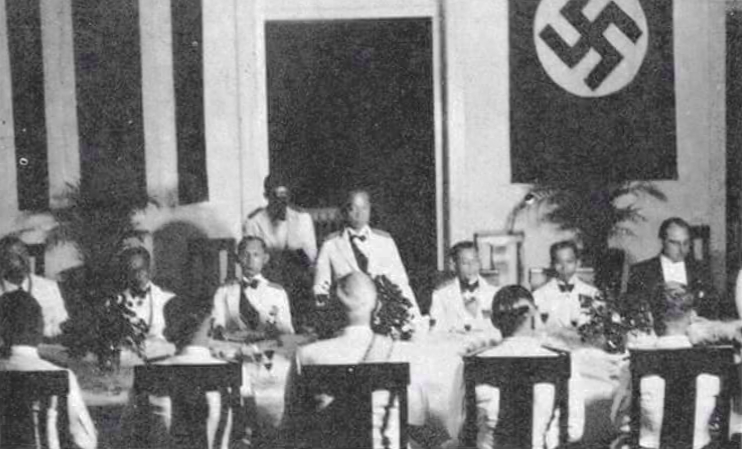
Luang Wichitwathakan (standing in the middle) and German diplomats, 1943

"Maha Chai" ("Great Victory")
"Maha Chai" ("Great Victory"), Thai patriotic song composed by Luang Wichitwathakan.

In 1942, Wichitwathakan became Minister of Foreign Affairs under Prime Minister Field Marshal Pibulsongkram and was responsible for negotiating free passage for the invading Japanese army in exchange for maintaining the sovereignty and independence of Thailand. He then assumed the duty of Thai Ambassador to Japan.

Upon the unconditional surrender of Japan to the Allies at the end of World War II, Wichitwathakan was arrested by the US occupying forces along with the German ambassador, Italian ambassador, and the entire Japanese cabinet. His wife, Khunying Wichitwathakan, requested and obtained a personal audience with General Douglas MacArthur during which she succeeded in explaining to him that as foreign minister, her husband had no alternative but to negotiate a treaty of free passage in exchange for maintaining the independence of Thailand. MacArthur released Wichitwathakan and allowed him to return to Thailand on an American airplane.

Wichitwathakan was arrested upon arrival and imprisoned by the new postwar government of Khuang Aphaiwong. He was incarcerated with former prime minister Pibulsongkram, to be tried in Thai court as war criminals. Among the principal allied forces, the British and the French wanted Pibulsongkram and Wichitwathakan to face the firing squad while the US alone insisted on a trial. All charges against them were eventually dropped for lack of corroborating evidence. Field Marshal Pibulsongkram and Luang Wichitwathakan were acquitted of all political accusations and released.

== Post-war service ==
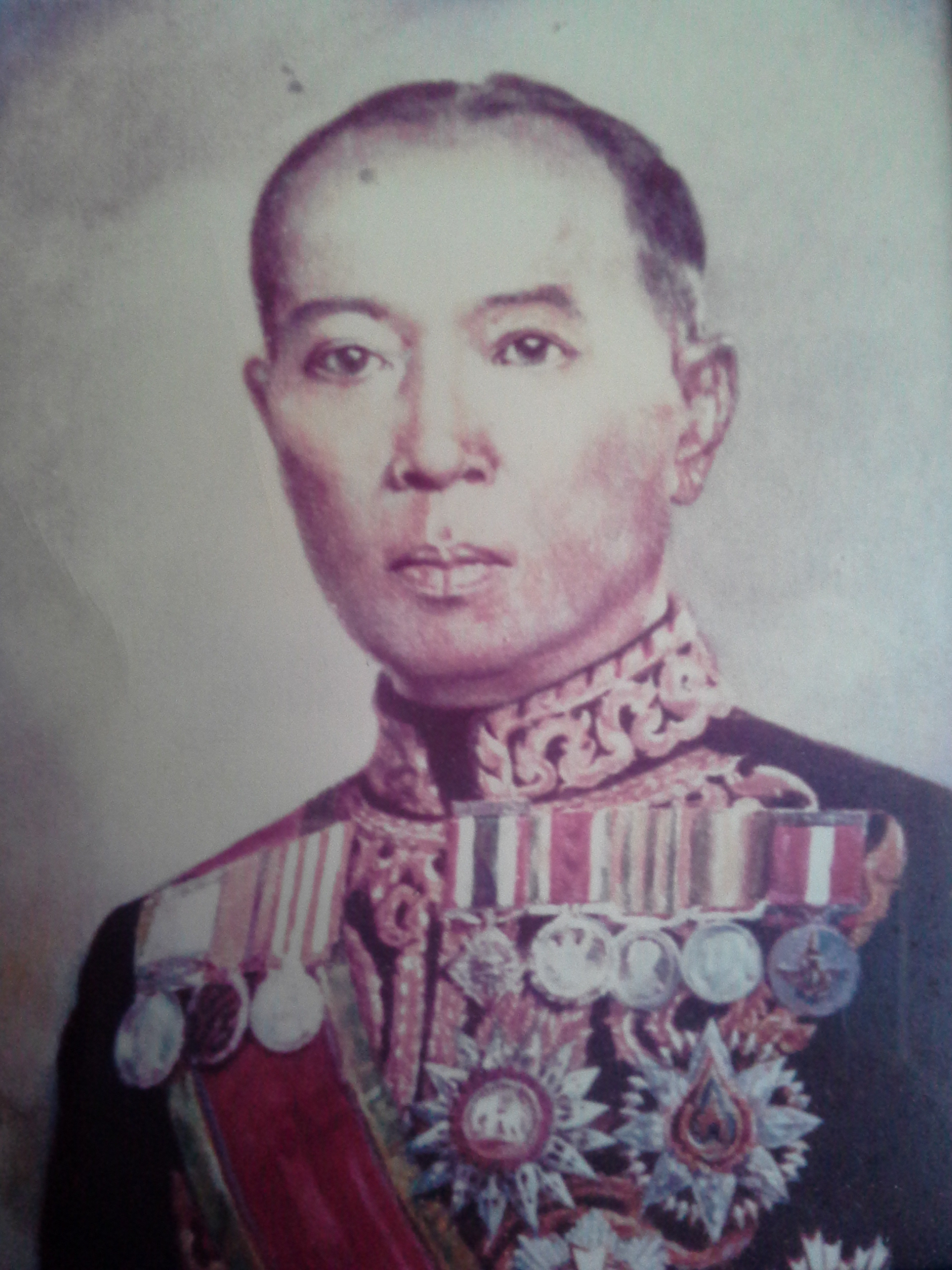
Portrait of Luang Wichitwathakan in 1958

After having been granted freedom, Wichitwathakan temporarily dissociated himself from politics and became a nationally prominent playwright, author, and historian. Most of his plays, songs, fictions as well as history and religious books were composed during the three years following his release from incarceration.

In 1947, Wichitwathakan assisted Field Marshal Pibulsongkram in staging a coup d'état which toppled the existing government from power. Wichitwathakan served in the new government as Minister of Finance and Minister of Economic Affairs and subsequently became Ambassador to India in 1952 and Ambassador to Switzerland, Austria, and Yugoslavia in 1953. He also promoted the unification and nationalism of the people of Thailand by composing a series of nationalistic theatrical works, known as the Anupap series, which were performed at the National Theater. This series of plays, titled Anupap Porkoon Ramkamhaeng (Power of King Ramkamhaeng), Anupap Haeng Kwam Seasala (Power of Sacrifice), Anupap Haeng Kwam Rak (Power of Love) were composed at the urging of Pibulsongkram with the purpose of strengthening the unity and cohesiveness of the Thai people. In 1958, Luang Wichitwathakan participated in the coup d'état staged by Field Marshal Sarit Thanarat that removed Pibulsongkram from power. In 1959 Wichitwathakan assumed the title of Paladbunchagarn (Thai: ปลัดบัญชาการ) of the Prime Minister's Office, equivalent to the Assistant to the Prime Minister. In the same year, he was appointed Secretary-General of the National Security Council, becoming the first person to hold this position. He served Field Marshal Sarit as his closest confidant and advisor and played an active role in promoting Thai nationalism.

== Died ==
Wichitwathakan died in 1962 at age 63 after a long cardiac illness.

== Published works ==
=== Plays ===
- Leod Supan (Blood of Supan)
- Rachamanu
- Suek Talang (Battle of Talang
- Pra jao Krung Thon (King of Thonburi)
- Tai Dab Na (Death at next Sword)
- Po Kun Pa Mueng (King Pa Mueng)
- Petch Pra Narai (Diamond of King Narai
- Lan Leod Lan Rug (Territory of Blood Territory of Love)
- Sriharajdecho
- Dab Saen Mueng (Sword of a Hundred Thousand Cities)
- Pra Naresuan Pragard Issarapap (King Naresuan Declares Independence)
- Rachatida Pra Ruang (Royal Daughter of Pra Ruang)
- Jao Ying Gannigar (Princess Gannigar)
- Jao Ying Sanwee (Princess Sanwee)
- Krut Dum (Black Garuda)
- Anupap Po Kun Ramkamhang (Power of King Ramkamhang)
- Anupap hang Kwam Rug (Power of Love)
- Anupap Hang Kwam Seasara (Power of Sacrifice)

=== Fiction ===
- Pan Tong Rong Leod (Golden Receptacle for Blood)
- Dok Fa Jampasak (Celestial Flower of Jampasak)
- Ballang Chieng Rung (Throne of Chieng Rung)
- Morasum Hang Cheevit (Tempest of Life)
- Petch Pra Narai (Diamond of King Narai)
- Plee Cheep Pue Choo (Sacrificing Life for Lover)
- Huang Rug Hav Luek (Bond of Love Deep Crevice)
- Fak Fa Salawin (Horizon of Salawin)
- Athit Asadong (Western Sunset)
- Lek Lang Kan (Iron for Vengeance)

=== Non-Fiction ===
- Mun Samong (Brain)
- Puttanupap (Power of Buddhism)
- Jittanupap (Power of Mind)
- Manusapatiwat (Human Revolution)
- Mahaburus (Great Men)
- Kong Dee Nai India (Good things in India)
- Vicha Paed Pragarn (Eight Sources of Knowledge)
- Vicha Krong Ruen Krong Rug (Science of Domesticity and Love)
- Vitee Tam Ngarn lae Srang Anakot (Way to Work and Build Future)
- Anakot kong Chart (Future of Nation)
- Sangsawang Nai Kwam Mued (Brightness in The dark)
- Sassana Sagol (Universal religion)
- Prawatsart Sagol (Universal History)
- Watanatum Sukothai (Civilization of Sukothai)
- Kwam Fun (Dream)

Political offices
Preceded by Direk Jayanama	Deputy Minister of Foreign Affairs; 1941–1942 with Direk Jayanama	Vacant Title next held by Phra Sutthiatnarumon
Preceded by Luang Phibunsongkhram	Minister of Foreign Affairs; 1942–1943	Succeeded by Direk Jayanama
Preceded by Phra Manuphanwimonsat	Minister of Finance; 1951	Succeeded by Pao Pienlert Boripanyutakit
Preceded by Munee Mahasanthana Vejayantarungsarit	Minister of Commerce; 1951–1952	Succeeded by Nai Worakanbancha as Minister of Economics
Government offices
First	Permanent Secretary-General to the Office of the Prime Minister; 1959–1962	Abolished position
First	Secretary-General of the National Security Council; 1959–1962	Succeeded by Phraya Sriwisanwacha
Diplomatic posts
Preceded by Direk Jayanama	Ambassador of Thailand to the Empire of Japan; 1943–1945	Vacant Title next held by Sa-nga Nilkamhaeng as Ambassador of Thailand to Japan
Preceded by Luang Pinit Aksorn	Ambassador of Thailand to India; 1952–1953	Succeeded by Luang Bhadravadi
Preceded by Luang Dithakar Bhakdi	Ambassador of Thailand to Switzerland, Asutria, and Yugoslavia; 1953–1959	Succeeded by Chitti Sucharitakul
Civic offices
First	Director-General of the Fine Arts Department; 1934–1942	Succeeded by Phraya Anuman Rajadhon
Preceded by Luang Ronnasitthiphichai	Director-General of the Government Public Relations Department; 1950	Succeeded by Surachit Jaruserani
Educational offices
Preceded by Duean Bunnag	President of Thammasat University acting 1950–1951	Succeeded by Sawat Sawatronnachai Sawatdikiat
