= Suchart Chaovisith =

Thai politician (1940–2009)

- สุชาติ เชาว์วิศิษฐ
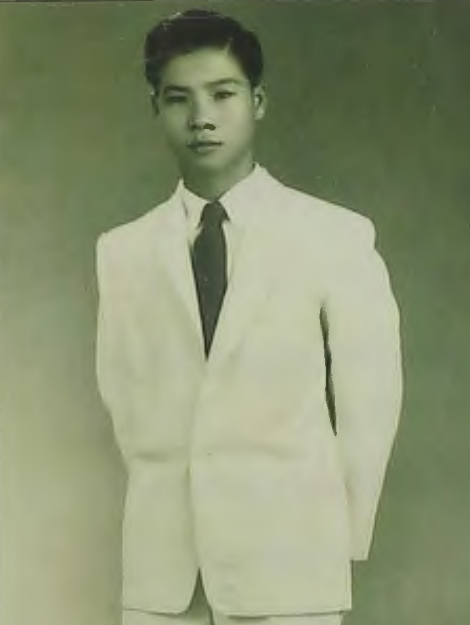

Deputy Prime Minister of Thailand
- In office 10 March 2004 – 5 October 2004
- Prime Minister: Thaksin Shinawatra

Finance Minister of Thailand
- In office 8 February 2003 – 10 March 2004
- Prime Minister: Thaksin Shinawatra
- Preceded by: Somkid Jatusripitak
- Succeeded by: Somkid Jatusripitak

Personal details
- Born: 21 April 1940 Chiang Mai, Thailand
- Died: 22 October 2009 (aged 69) Bangkok, Thailand
- Party: Thai Rak Thai Party
- Spouse: Rattana Chaovisith
- Education: London School of Economics
- Profession: Economist; politician

Suchart Chaovisith (Thai: สุชาติ เชาว์วิศิษฐ, RTGS: Suchat Chaowisit; April 21, 1940 – October 22, 2009) was a Thai politician who served as Thailand's Minister of Finance from 2003 until 2004 and the Deputy Prime Minister in 2004.

== Early life and education ==
Suchart Chaovisith was born in Chiang Mai Province, Thailand. He graduated from Assumption College later in 1956 he graduated from Diocesan Boys' School in Hong Kong. In the Year 1959 he graduated from GCE A' Level Bristol College of Commerce and granted a Bachelor of Economics from London School of Economics in 1962.

His government career began when he took a position in the finance department of the Royal Thai Army in 1966. He transferred to the Ministry of Finance in 1972, where he held a number of positions. In 1993, Suchart was appointed the deputy permanent secretary for finance. In 1997, Suchart became the director-general of Revenue Department, his last position within the Thai civil service.

Suchart joined politics as a member of the Thai Rak Thai Party, which has since been disbanded. He was elected as a member of the National Assembly of Thailand. He became the Minister of Finance in 2003, and was promoted to Deputy Prime Minister in 2004.

== Death ==
Suchart Chaovisith died of laryngeal cancer at the Bumrungrad International Hospital in Bangkok on October 22, 2009, at the age of 69. His body was taken to the Wat Debsirindrawas Ratchaworawiharn's pavilion 14 for funeral bathing rites. His funeral rites were held for seven days after his death.

== Royal decorations ==
- 1996 – Knight Grand Cordon (Special Class) of the Most Exalted Order of the White Elephant
- 1993 – Knight Grand Cordon (Special Class) of The Most Noble Order of the Crown of Thailand
- 1997 – Chakrabarti Mala Medal
