= Somkid Jatusripitak =

Thai economist, business theorist, and politician

- สมคิด จาตุศรีพิทักษ์ 曾汉光
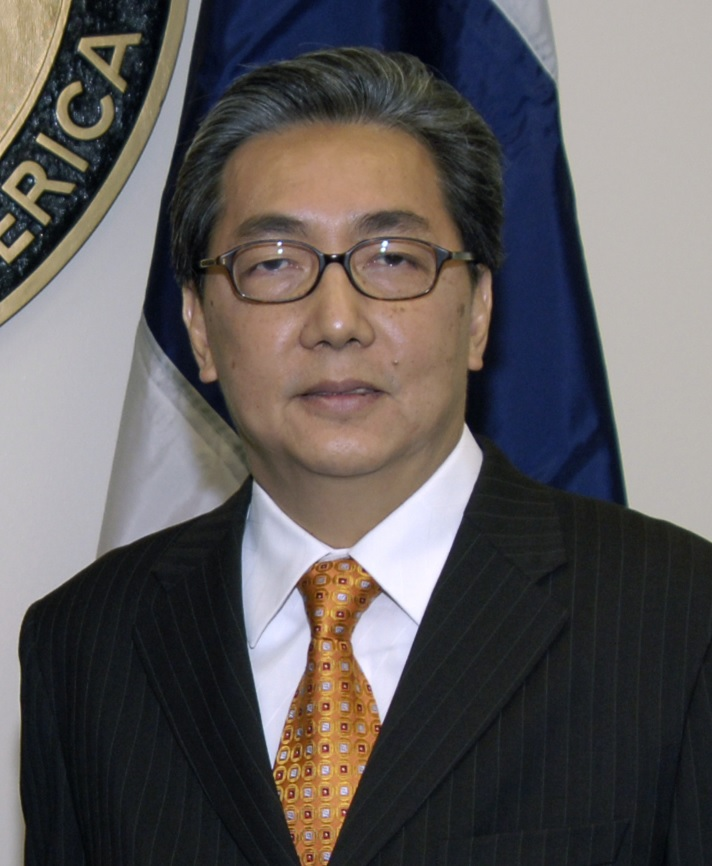
- Somkid Jatusripitak in 2006

Deputy Prime Minister of Thailand
- In office 20 August 2015 – 14 July 2020
- Prime Minister: Prayut Chan-o-cha
- In office 11 March 2005 – 19 September 2006
- Prime Minister: Thaksin Shinawatra
- In office 8 February 2003 – 10 March 2004
- Prime Minister: Thaksin Shinawatra
- In office 9 October 2001 – 3 October 2002
- Prime Minister: Thaksin Shinawatra

Minister of Finance
- In office 10 March 2004 – 2 August 2005
- Prime Minister: Thaksin Shinawatra
- Preceded by: Suchart Chaovisith
- Succeeded by: Thanong Bidaya
- In office 17 February 2001 – 8 February 2003
- Prime Minister: Thaksin Shinawatra
- Preceded by: Tarrin Nimmanahaeminda
- Succeeded by: Suchart Chaovisith

Minister of Commerce
- In office 3 August 2005 – 19 September 2006
- Prime Minister: Thaksin Shinawatra
- Preceded by: Thanong Bidaya
- Succeeded by: Krirk-krai Jirapaet

Personal details
- Born: 15 July 1953 (age 73) Bangkok, Thailand
- Party: Sang Anakot Thai (2022-present)
- Other political affiliations: Thai Rak Thai (1998-2007); Chart Pattana (2007-2011); Palang Pracharath (2018-2020)
- Spouse: Aruratchani Jatusripitak
- Education: Thammasat University; NIDA; Northwestern University
- Profession: Economist; politician
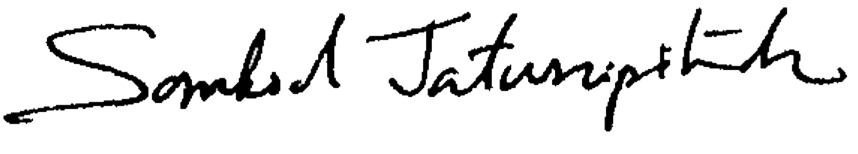
- Signature

Somkid Jatusripitak (Chinese: 曾汉光, Thai: สมคิด จาตุศรีพิทักษ์, RTGS: Somkhit Chatusiphithak; born 15 July 1953) is a Thai economist, business theorist, and politician. A mentee of Philip Kotler, he has (co-)authored books on competitiveness and taught marketing at Thai universities. He was a co-founder and leader of the Thai Rak Thai Party (TRT) and was mainly responsible for developing the party's progressive and reformist economic and social platform. After the party's electoral victory, he served as Deputy Prime Minister, Minister of Finance, and Minister of Commerce in Thaksin Shinawatra's government. Following the coup d'état in 2006, the junta chose him as an economic envoy, advocating the royally-endorsed "self-sufficiency" economic agenda.

As one of 111 executive members of the TRT, he was banned from political activities for five years after the 2006 coup d'état.

After another military coup in 2014, he served as the junta's advisor on foreign economic relations. Since September 2014 he has been a full member of the so-called National Council for Peace and Order.

== Early life ==
Somkid was born in Bangkok's Chinatown and grew up in a large, but modest Thai Chinese (Teochew) family, one of 10 children. His great-great-grandfather immigrated from Swatow city (early 19th century). Despite being born and raised in Thailand, Somkid still speaks Thai with a strong Chinese accent. One of his older brothers, Som Jatusripitak later became president of Siam City Bank and Commerce Minister in Chavalit Yongchaiyudh's government.

== Education and academic career ==
Somkid went to Triam Udom Suksa School and graduated with a bachelor's degree from the Faculty of Economics, Thammasat University in 1972. Later, he completed an MBA in Finance from the Graduate School of Business Administration (NIDA Business School), National Institute of Development Administration (NIDA) and a Ph.D. in marketing from the Kellogg School of Management at Northwestern University. After graduating, he joined a teaching position and became associate professor in marketing at the Graduate School of Business Administration (NIDA Business School). He also served as an Associate Dean at NIDA Business School. Somkid's thinking was greatly influenced by Michael Porter's "Competitiveness of Nations". He focused much of his academic research on the development of national and business competitiveness. Along with his mentor Philip Kotler, he was a strong supporter of the concept of Nation Branding. In 1997, Somkid co-authored "The Marketing of Nations: A Strategic Approach to Building National Wealth" with Philip Kotler. The book outlined how countries could improve their competitiveness through marketing and appropriate policies to support it. Somkid's book, Borisat Prathet Thai ("Thailand Inc: Concepts and Strategy"), stressed how Thailand should use marketing to improve its competitiveness.

== Career ==
=== Business ===
Somkid was a co-founder of the Manager Media Group, along with Sondhi Limthongkul. He played a role in the establishment of the Phatra Research Institute. He became a Director of the Saha Pattanapibul Group, a major Thai consumer goods conglomerate. He was appointed to become Advisor of the Stock Exchange of Thailand, Director of PTTEP, and Director of the Petroleum Authority of Thailand. In 2012, Somkid founded the Thailand Future Study Institute, a think tank which is sponsored by major Thai business corporations and seeks to provide research and consulting to public bodies and private sector.

=== Politics ===
Somkid was secretary to Foreign Minister Thaksin Shinawatra under Banharn Silpa-Archa's government in 1995–96 and secretary to Finance Minister Thanong Bidaya under Chavalit Yongchaiyudh's government in 1996–97.

Somkid was one of the co-founders of the Thai Rak Thai party in 1998, along with party leader Thaksin Shinawatra. His senior stature in the party was apparent from his no. 3 position in the TRT's 2001 election party list, behind Thaksin Shinawatra and Purachai Piemsomboon. Somkid has been called "the man behind Thaksinomics", and was the mastermind of the populist policies that helped propel the Thai Rak Thai party to a landslide election victory in 2001. The TRT "won by embracing populism on a grand scale," said the Far Eastern Economic Review. Somkid's chief policy innovations included the universal healthcare program, 1 million THB development funds for each of Thailand's 70,000 villages, a 3-year loan freeze for farmers, fast-track privatization of state enterprises, and a national asset management corporation (AMC) to buy up the $20 billion in bad debt carried by Thai banks.

Somkid also pioneered the TRT party's rural small and medium enterprise (SME) policy. Noting that agriculture remains the most important economic sector, employing 60-70% of the Thai population, the economic challenge was to develop the agricultural sector and link it with the modern sector. This became one of the founding principles of the Thaksin government's popular One Tambon One Product (OTOP) program. At the time, The Nation newspaper exclaimed that these policies "amount to a revolution in Thai public policy".

From the TRT's landslide election win of 2001, Somkid was a core member of Thakin's economic inner cabinet - starting off as Finance Minister (February 2001 to February 2003) and then becoming Commerce Minister (August 2005 to September 2006). As Finance Minister, Somkid oversaw a management reshuffle at state-owned Thai Airways International; led the establishment of the national asset management corporation (AMC); and supported the controversial restructuring of Prachai Leophai-ratana's Thai Petrochemical Industry (TPI) In 2002, he established the village fund program, which gave each of Thailand's 70,000 villages a self-managed fund of 1 million THB (approx. US$25,000), to be used for grassroots social and economic investments. As Commerce Minister, he oversaw the recovery of tourism industry in the Andaman coast after the tsunami of 2004; agreed to draw up a comprehensive road map for increasing trade, investment and cooperation with the United Kingdom; and boosted Board of Investment incentives in three target sectors: electronics, petrochemicals and vehicle tyres.

During the anti-Thaksin demonstrations of 2005-2006, Thaksin noted that Somkid was one of four individuals who might succeed him as Prime Minister if he stepped down. After Thaksin Shinawatra's announcement that he would not accept the Premiership from Parliament after the April 2006 elections, Somkid was widely seen as a potential replacement. In a poll of businessmen, 57% said Somkid was the most suitable candidate for new premier. The next highest TRT politician was Bhokin Bhalakula, who received only 12%. Soon later, a broad coalition of TRT factions, including Wang Nam Yom (130 MPs), Rim Nam (15 MPs), Lamtakong (7 MPs), Wang Phya Nag (10 MPs), Chon Buri (7 MPs) and the Central provinces (10 MPs) decided to push for Somkid Jatusripitak as the next prime minister.

==== 2006 coup ====
The Thai military staged a successful coup against the Thaksin government on 19 September 2006. At the time, Somkid was in Paris, attending the Thai-France Cultural Exhibition with Princess Sirindhorn and Foreign Minister Kantathi Supamongkhon. On 21 September 2006 arrived back to Bangkok. Unlike several other senior members of Thaksin's Cabinet, he was not arrested by the junta. Somkid kept a low profile, until on 2 October 2006 he resigned from the Thai Rak Thai Party, along with Thaksin Shinawatra.

He continued to lead a low profile, until in February 2007, he was appointed head of a government committee charged with "preaching" King Bhumibol's self-sufficient economy policy. The appointment provoked great controversy, as critics claimed that the populist economics czar had no role promoting self-sufficiency. Somkid appointment was supported by General Saprang Kalyanamitr, a powerful member of the junta, and Sondhi Limthongkul of the People's Alliance for Democracy, a long-time colleague of Somkid's. Somkid later decided to resign from the committee, which was then dissolved. Somkid's long-time rival, Finance Minister Pridiyathorn Devakula volunteered to help perform the committee's role, and denied any role in Somkid's resignation.

In early May 2007, a group of former elected senators said they were ready to support Somkid in forming a new political party, the so-called Dharma Thippatai group. Among those included Suraporn Danaitangtrakoon, Anek Laothamatas (former leader of the Mahachon Party), and former Thai Rak Thai members Suranand Vejjajiva and Pimol Srivikorn. On 26 June 2007, they founded Ruam Jai Thai. However, on 30 May 2007 the Constitutional Tribunal had produced a verdict, barring all 111 former executive members of Thai Rak Thai Party, including Somkid, from holding political office for five years.

==== 2014 coup ====
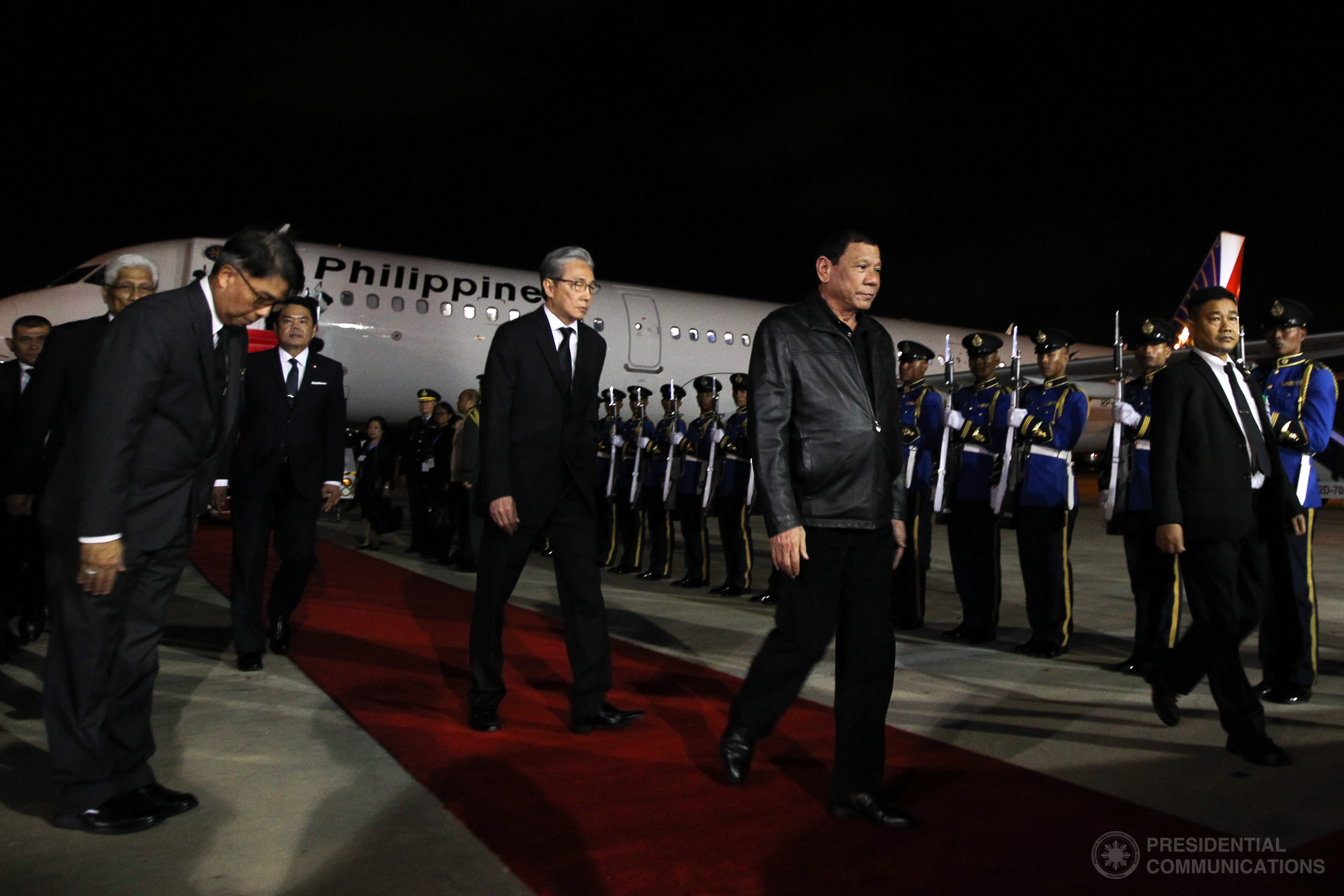
Deputy Prime Minister Somkid Jatusripitak with President Rodrigo Duterte at the Royal Thai Air Force Air Terminal in Bangkok in 2017

After the 22 May 2014 coup d'état, the junta—which calls itself National Council for Peace and Order (NCPO)—appointed Somkid member of its "advisory board" in charge of foreign economic relations, especially with Asian countries China and Japan. On 16 September Somkid—as one of two civilians— was appointed a member of the NCPO.

Following his departure from the junta cabinet in 2020, Jatusripitak joined the recently formed Sang Anganot Thai (Building Thailand's Future) party founded by former fellow ministers Sontirat Sontijirawong and Uttama Savanayana, and agreed to be its prime ministerial nominee should the party win no less than 25 seats in the upcoming general election.

== Personal life ==
In March 2006, during the height of the anti-Thaksin protests, Somkid underwent balloon angioplasty surgery to relieve a blood clot in an artery near his heart.

His wife, Anurachanee Jatusripitak, teaches at Chulalongkorn University. They have three children.

== Selected works ==
- (co-authored with Philip Kotler and Liam Fahey). The New Competition. Englewood Cliffs, N.J.: Prentice-Hall. 1985. ISBN 0136120784.
- The Exporting Behavior of Manufacturing Firms. Ann Arbor, Mich.: UMI Research Press. 1986. ISBN 0835717232.
- (co-authored with Philip Kotler and Suvit Maesincee). The Marketing of Nations: A strategic approach to building national wealth. New York: Free Press. 1997. ISBN 068483488X.
