= National Institute of Development Administration =

Business school

Coordinates: 13°46′11″N 100°39′09″E

- สถาบันบัณฑิตพัฒนบริหารศาสตร์
- Motto: Natthi Paññasamā Ābhā; WISDOM for Sustainable Development
- Type: Public
- Established: 1 April 1966
- President: Tippawan Lorasuwannarat
- Royal conferrer: Maha Chakri Sirindhorn, Princess Royal of Thailand on behalf of the King
- Postgraduates: 8,298 (2009 academic year)
- Location: Bangkok, Thailand
- Campus: Bangkapi
- Colours: Yellow
- Website: www.nida.ac.th

The National Institute of Development Administration (NIDA) (Thai: สถาบันบัณฑิตพัฒนบริหารศาสตร์) is a public higher education institute in Thailand, that teaches only at the graduate level, with a strong emphasis on management, economics and sustainable development. It also has duties in research, training, and other academic services. It focuses on creating high-level executives.

NIDA is considered the first Thai educational institution to offer a MPA program, and offered the first MBA program in Thailand.

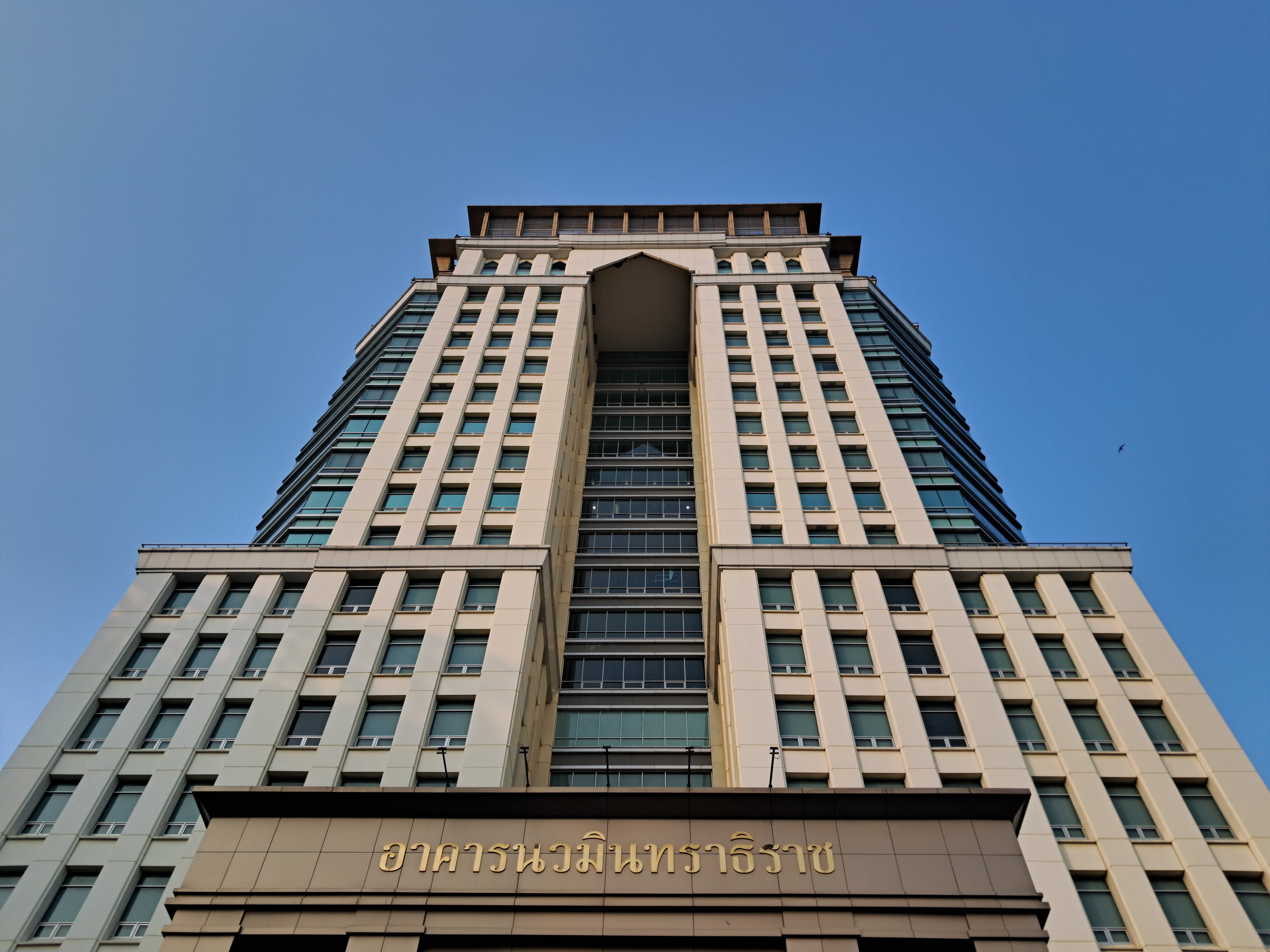
NIDA - National Institute of Development Administration

NIDA has 10 graduate schools aimed to serve economic and social development such as Graduate School of Public Administration (GSPA), One of the founding schools. NIDA Business School received accreditation from the Association to Advance Collegiate Schools of Business (AACSB).

== History of the institute ==
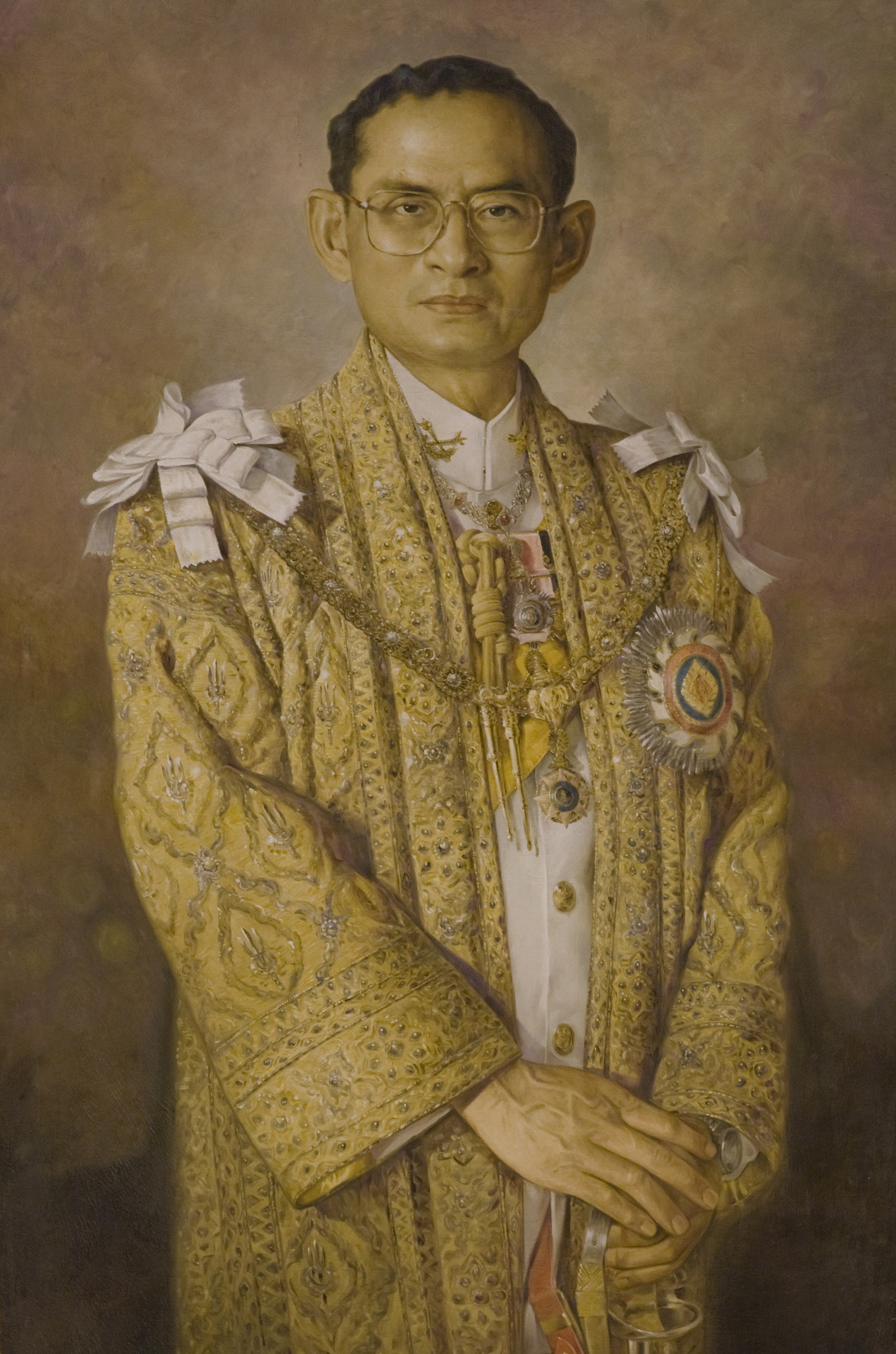
The Institute was founded under the Royal Initiative of His Majesty King Bhumibol

NIDA was founded on 1 April 1966. His Majesty King Bhumibol Adulyadej (Rama IX) was especially interested in economic development. Around 1960, he spoke to Mr. David Rockefeller, an American entrepreneur, about improving national statistics. which is a very important factor in the development of the country And finally, a project was proposed to the government to establish the Institute with initial assistance from the Department of Technical and Economic Cooperation (now USAID), the Ford Foundation, and the Midwest Universities Consortium for International Activities (MUCIA). The Institute has faculty member from Indiana University, USA, as the leading U.S. School of Public Affairs, participated in the curriculum and conducted the teaching.

At the beginning, NIDA was an autonomous institute affiliated with Thammasat University which ran its own activities and managed its own budget. Later, a merger of the Graduate School of Public Administration (GSPA) of Thammasat University and resources from the National Economic and Social Development Board and National Statistical Office combined to become a full-fledged graduate institute concentrating exclusively on graduate studies in fields related to national development. The establishment of the institute was presided over by Prince Wan Waithayakon, Thai Royal Prince, Deputy Prime Minister and Diplomat, as the chairman of the founding committee.

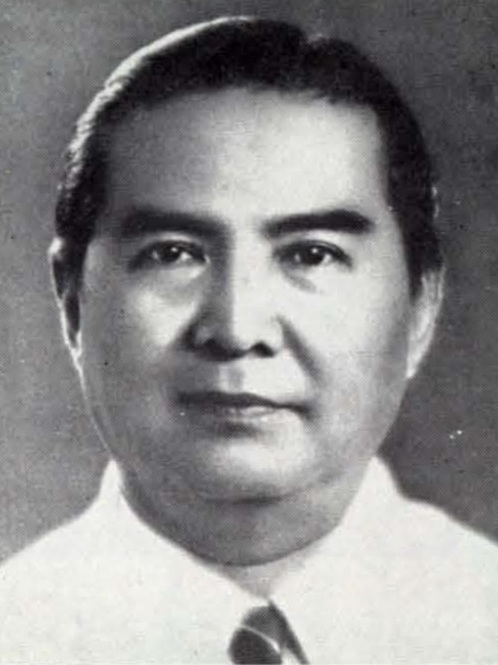
Prince Wan Waithayakon

The purpose of its establishment is to cultivate leaders or executives who will work in various organizations. Produce master's and doctorate alumni to play leadership roles in policy and administration. Both in the government sector at the level of ministries, departments, state enterprises and in various private business sectors. So that all sectors work together to drive development.

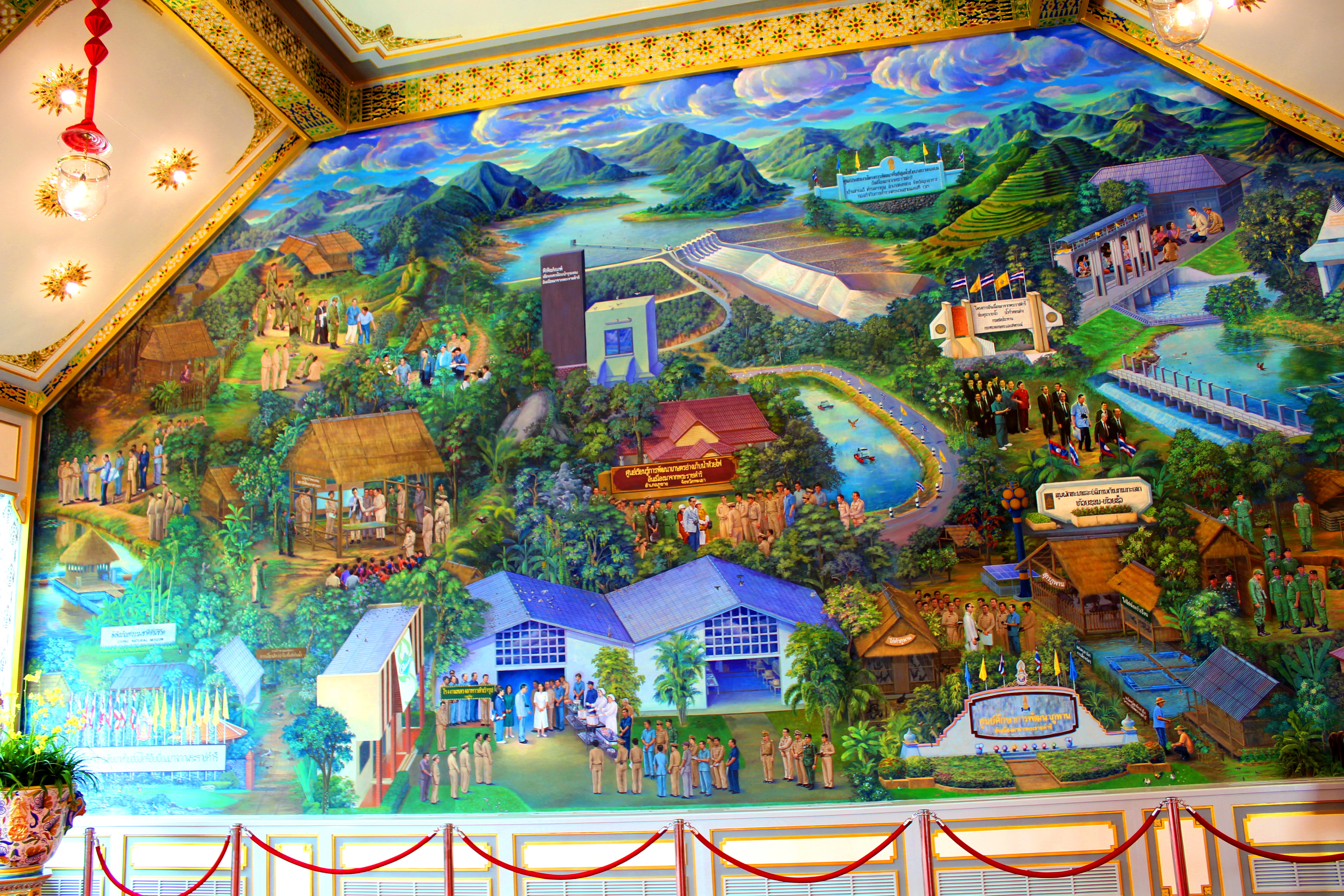

NIDA is a Public Policy School that has expertise to providing academic work in response towards development economics, governance, international security and sustainable development, especially in the context of the ASEAN

== Notable people ==
- Wan Waithayakon, Deputy Prime Minister, Diplomat, and President of the Eleventh Session of the United Nations General Assembly.
- Chuan Leekpai, 20th Prime Minister of Thailand.
- Somchai Wongsawat, 26th Prime Minister of Thailand.
- Supachai Panitchpakdi, Director-General of the World Trade Organization (WTO), Secretary-General of the UN Conference on Trade and Development (UNCTAD), Deputy Prime Minister, Distinguished Professor of Economics.
- Somkid Jatusripitak, Deputy Prime Minister, Minister of Finance and Minister of Commerce, Alumni and former professor of Business from NIDA Business School.
- Thanong Bidaya, Deputy Prime Minister and Minister of Finance, Former professor of finance and dean from NIDA Business School.
- Yongyuth Wichaidit, Deputy Prime Minister, Minister of Interior of Thailand, and Leader of Pheu Thai Party.
- Anupong Paochinda, Minister of Interior and Commander-in-Chief of the Royal Thai Army.
- Direk Patamasiriwat, Professor of Economics, Researcher of Thailand Development Research Institute (TDRI) and Economic Officer of the World Bank.
- Wolfgang Drechsler, Tallinn University of Technology and Harvard University, visiting professor.
- Uttama Savanayana, Minister of Finance, Former professor of Finance at the NIDA Business School.
- Narumon Pinyosinwat, Deputy Minister of Labour, Former professor of Finance at the NIDA Business School.
- Surawit Khonsomboon, Prime Minister's Office, Minister of Thailand, and Deputy Minister of Public Health.
- Nattawut Saikua, Deputy Minister of Commerce of Thailand and Deputy Minister of Agriculture and Cooperatives of Thailand.
- Thaworn Senniam, Deputy Minister of Interior of Thailand.
- Apirak Kosayodhin, Governor, Bangkok Metropolitan Administration.
- Karoon Sai-ngam, Senator, Buriram province.

== Partner institutions ==
NIDA has partnerships with the following universities and institutions:

- (United States) Indiana University
- (United Kingdom) London School of Economics and Political Science (LSE)
- (Germany) University of Potsdam
- (Japan) National Graduate Institute for Policy Studies (GRIPS)
- (South Korea) Seoul National University
- (South Korea) Korea University
- (Taiwan) National Chengchi University
- (China) Beijing Foreign Studies University
- (Australia) Monash University
- (New Zealand) Victoria University of Wellington
- (Thailand) Office of the National Economic and Social Development Council
- (Thailand) Office of the Public Sector Development Commission
- (Thailand) Chulalongkorn University
- (Thailand) Thammasat University
- (Thailand) King Prajadhipok’s Institute
