= Tarrin Nimmanahaeminda =

Thai economist and politician

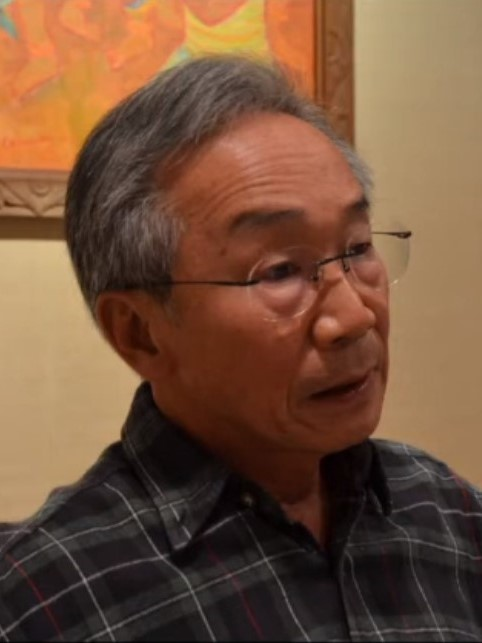

Minister of Finance
- In office 14 August 1992 – 17 July 1995
- Prime Minister: Chuan Leekpai
- Preceded by: Panat Simasathien
- Succeeded by: Surakiart Sathirathai
- In office 14 November 1997 – 16 February 2001
- Prime Minister: Chuan Leekpai
- Preceded by: Thanong Bidaya
- Succeeded by: Somkid Jatusripitak

Personal details
- Born: 29 October 1945 (age 80) Mueang Chiang Mai district, Thailand
- Party: Democrat Party
- Education: Harvard College (BA); Stanford Graduate School of Business (MBA)

Tarrin Nimmanahaeminda (born October 29, 1945 in Mueang Chiang Mai) is a Thai economist and government minister. He was the Minister of Finance from 1992 to 1995 and from 1997 to 2001.

Political offices
Preceded by Panat Simasathien	Minister of Finance; 1992–1995	Succeeded by Surakiart Sathirathai
Preceded by Thanong Bidaya	Minister of Finance; 1997–2001	Succeeded by Somkid Jatusripitak
