= Serm Vinicchayakul =

Thai economist

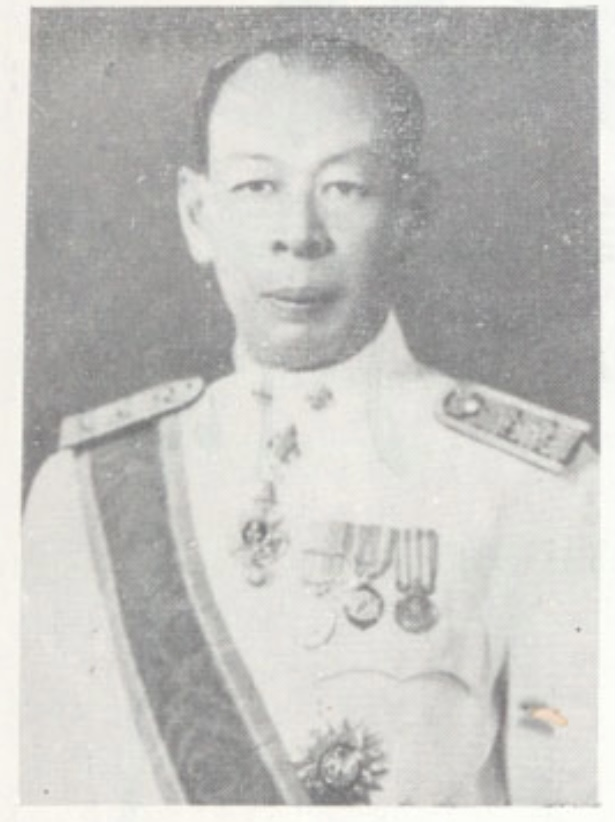
Serm's portrait

Serm Vinicchayakul (Thai: เสริม วินิจฉัยกุล, RTGS: Soem Winitchaikun; 2 June 1907 – 12 July 1985) was a Thai legal scholar and economist. He served as Governor of the Bank of Thailand, Permanent Secretary of the Ministry of Finance, and Minister of Finance.

Serm attended Assumption College, and graduated law from the Law School of the Ministry of Justice in 1929, where he also worked as a French translator. He continued in the role when the school was merged to become the University of Moral and Political Sciences in 1933, translating textbooks into Thai. He then received a government scholarship to study private law and economics in France, and graduated Doctor of Law (docteur en droit) from the University of Paris in 1935. He returned to work in the Office of the Council of State, becoming Secretary of the Council of State. He joined the Free Thai Movement when World War II reached Thailand, and in 1946 became Governor of the Bank of Thailand amidst the post-war inflation crisis. He implemented fiscal stabilization policies, and served two separate terms as the governor, before becoming Permanent Secretary of the Ministry of Finance, and later the Minister of Finance, holding the position in four separate terms between 1957 and 1973.
