= Karoon Sai-ngam =

Thai politician (born 1952)

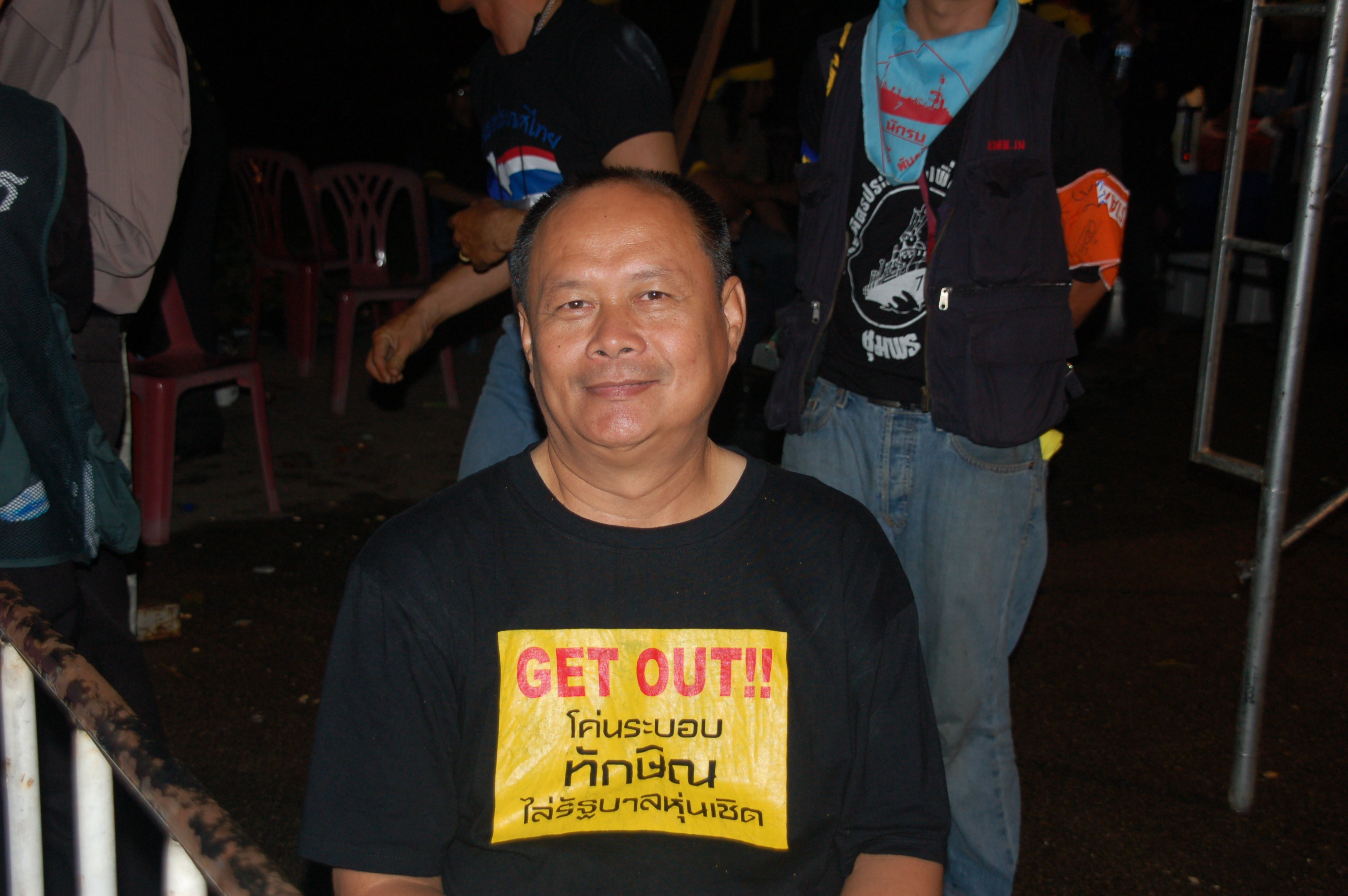
Karoon Sai-ngam in a PAD rally in Trang province

Karoon Sai-ngam (Thai: การุณ ใสงาม, RTGS: Karun Sai-ngan; born 1 October 1952), politician, is a former Senator of the Kingdom of Thailand. He became well known for his criticism of Premier Thaksin Shinawatra and his call for female supporters to pass photos of Thaksin between their legs while cursing him to exile. He is married, with 2 children.

== Early life and education ==
Karoon was born in Buriram Province. He has a bachelor's degree in law from Ramkhamhaeng University and a master's degree in Development Administration from the National Institute of Development Administration.

== Member of the House of Representatives ==
Karoon was a Member of the House of Representatives in 1983, 1986, and 1995. He was appointed Secretary to Minister of the Prime Minister's Office in 1986, Assistant Secretary to Minister of Public Health from 1988 to 1991, and Assistant Secretary to Minister of Agriculture and cooperatives in 1991.

== Senator ==
Karoon submitted an unsuccessful motion to withdraw Thai troops from Iraq.

During the Thailand political crisis of 2005–2006, he controversially called for King Bhumibol Adulyadej to replace elected Prime Minister Thaksin Shinawatra. The King, in a speech on 26 April 2006, responded "Asking for a Royally appointed prime minister is undemocratic. It is, pardon me, a mess. It is irrational."

Senator Karoon is a noted critic of Prime Minister Thaksin Shinawatra. He has called for the public to protest Prime Minister Thaksin Shinawatra by not paying taxes. He has promised to seize Thaksin's personal assets.

Senator Karoon has told women to pass photos of Thaksin between their legs and curse Thaksin three times to leave Thailand and flee to Singapore.

Karoon supported a military coup which overthrew Thaksin in September 2006. The junta dissolved the constitution and Senate, and later appointed Karoon as a member of an Assembly in charge of drafting a new constitution.
