= Kitiyakara Voralaksana =

Kitiyakara Voralaksana กิติยากรวรลักษณ์
- Prince of Chanthaburi I
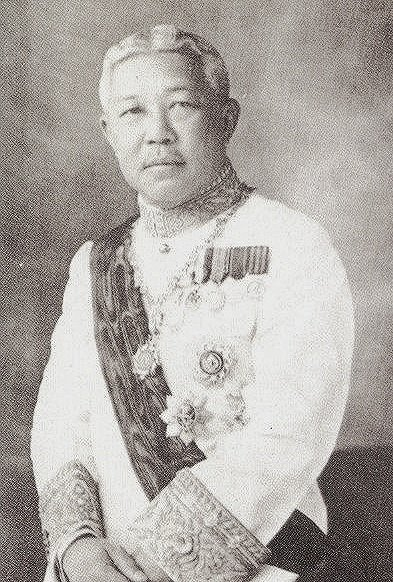
- Born: 8 June 1874; Grand Palace, Bangkok, Siam
- Died: 27 May 1931 (aged 56); Paris, France
- Spouse: Princess Apsarasaman Devakula; Chon Vijayabhai; La-ong Vicharanabutra; Chan Indraket; Lamiat Plianprayun
- Issue: see § Marriage and issue
- House: Kitiyakara family (Chakri Dynasty)
- Father: Chulalongkorn (Rama V)
- Mother: Uam Bisalayabutra

Acting Minister of Royal Treasury
- In office 11 February 1908 – 1 April 1908
- Preceded by: Koed Bunnag

Minister of Royal Treasury
- In office 1 April 1908 – 17 January 1923
- Succeeded by: Suphayok Kasem

Minister of Commerce
- In office 20 August 1920 – 23 March 1926
- Preceded by: Office established
- Succeeded by: Prince of Kamphaengphet as minister of commerce and transport

Kitiyakara Voralaksana, 1st Prince of Chanthaburi (Thai: กิติยากรวรลักษณ์; RTGS: Kitiyakonworalak; 8 June 1874 – 27 May 1931) was a Prince of Siam, a member of the Siamese Royal Family (later Thailand). He originated the House of Kitiyakara (ราชสกุลกิติยากร). His descendants use this royal surname. He is the paternal grandfather of Queen Sirikit, consort of King Bhumibol Adulyadej (Rama IX of Thailand). Through Sirikit he is also the maternal great-grandfather of King Maha Vajiralongkorn (Rama X), who has been King of Thailand since 2016.

== Biography ==
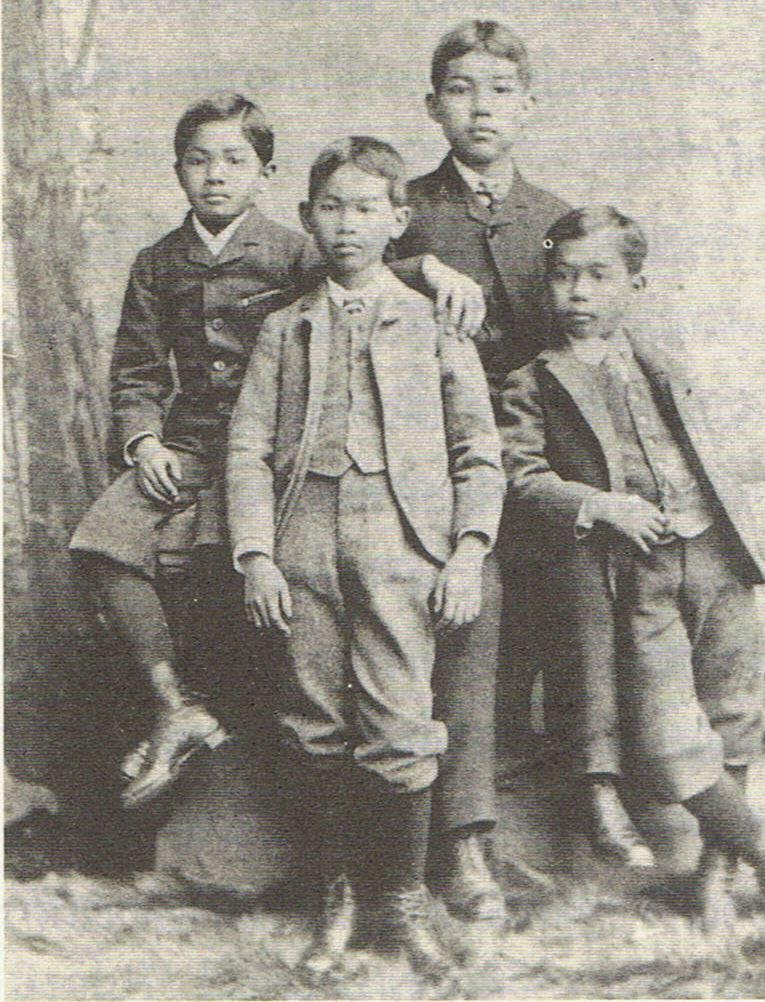
King Chulalongkorn's four sons while studying in Britain

Prince Kitiyakara Voralaksana was born at Grand Palace, Bangkok. He was the 12th child of King Chulalongkorn, Rama V of Siam, and Chao Chom Manda Uam (เจ้าจอมมารดาอ่วม). His maternal grandfather was a prominent Thai Chinese businessman who initiated the creation of the Khlong Phasi Charoen. He attended primary school at Suankularb Wittayalai School, Bangkok. In 1885, he went to the United Kingdom, to study Oriental Studies, Pali and Sanskrit at Balliol College, Oxford. He went to study abroad with three of his half-brothers:

- Prince Raphi Phatthanasak, Prince of Ratchaburi
- Prince Pravitra Vadhanodom, Prince of Prachinburi
- Prince Chirapravati Voradej, Prince of Nakhon Chaisi

After returning to Bangkok, he worked in the Office of the Royal Secretariat and Education Office (later Ministry of Education). On 26 April 1902, his father gave him the royal title as Prince of Chanthaburi, translated as Krom Muen Chunthaburi Naruenat (กรมหมื่นจันทบุรีนฤนาถ, the fifth level of the Krom ranks. He had used this title until his father's death. His royal title was elevated from Krom Muen into Krom Phra, the second level of the Krom ranks by his half-brother, King Vajiravudh (Rama VI)

== Royal duties ==
He had worked at the Royal Secretariat office once he had come back to Siam in 1894 before becoming the director general of Education Department, ministry of education before being transferred to Comptroller General Department, Ministry of Finance in 1902 due to the diploma on accountant while studying in Balliol College, Oxford University. He later become an acting minister of finance in 1907 after resignation of Phraya Suriyanuwat (Koed Bunnag) due to endless conflicts with other ministers in the cabinet and the tax collectors. He had become officially minister of finance on 1 April 1908 due to his competency to handle the affairs in Ministry of Finance which successfully paved the way for Siamese Baht to be in Gold Standard on 11 November 1908.

He established the Saving Office (now Government Saving Bank) on 1 April 1913 for common people, savings and deposit to avoid any dangers; like thieves, fires, etc. He promoted saving money to all the people, and he established the Department of Commerce and statistics management service. He outlined the legal regulation of customs, and updated the ministries of revenue and taxation. Then were collected all the levy offices in the one department, in the control of this ministry. Moreover, he provided laws of alcohol and opium control into a government monopoly, thus paving the way for the future ability to enforce the government's opium ban.

In 1920, he became minister of commerce, according with his excellent ability in commerce and economics. However, he had to step down from minister of finance due to the heavy workloads on both ministries, especially the financial deficits during 1920's.

In the reign of King Prajadhipok (Rama VII), he became a member of the Supreme Council of State of Siam on 27 November 1925, with his uncles, and his half-brother, including

- Prince Bhanurangsi Savangwongse, the Prince Bhanubandhu Vongsevoradej
- Prince Chitcharoen, the Prince Narisara Nuvadtivongs
- Prince Disuankumarn, the Prince Damrong Rajanubhab
- Prince Paribatra Sukhumbandhu, the Prince of Nakhon Sawan

Moreover, he also worked as the committee of Siamese Royal Institute. He translated the novel Chandrakumarn Chadok from Pali into a Thai version. He created the Pali-Thai-Sanskrit-English Glossary, by using references from the Pali dictionary of R.C. Childers. Later the Pali Pakorn Association published this as the primary edition of dictionary, as the original had not been clearly done. Later, in the reign of King Bhumibol Adulyadej (Rama IX) gave the responsibility of restoring the original edition to Mom Luang Chirayu Navawongs, member of the Privy Council, joining with the Maha Mongkut Royal College Foundation. This new edition was established, published and now has become widely well-known.

== Later life ==
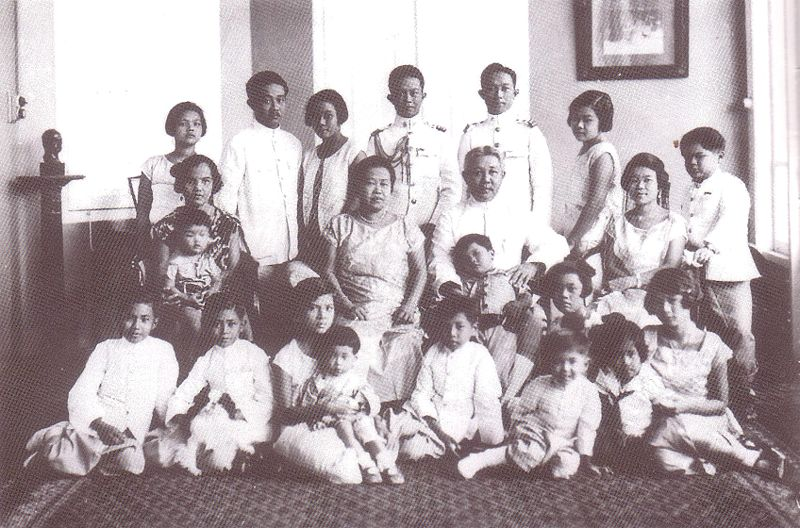
Members of the House of Kitiyakara, 1925

In his later life, he went to Paris, France, to have his illnesses (Laryngeal cancer) treated. But he died there peacefully on 27 May 1931. Later, the Minister of Commerce built his statue and erected it to stand in front of the Commerce Ministry building. And the statue can be seen there, still standing today. This is in remembrance of the fact that he was the first Minister of Commerce of Siam, and all he did to protect the savings of common people in Thailand.

The official residence of the House of Kitiyakara is Deves Palace, Bangkok. His descendants continue to live in this palace today.

== Marriage and issue ==
Prince Kitiyakara Voralaksana, the Prince of Chunthaburi had 5 consorts, with 24 children; 14 sons and 10 daughters.

- Mom Chao Absornsamarn Devakula, daughter of Prince Devan Udayavonsge, the Prince Dhevavongse Varoprakarn; had 6 sons and 6 daughters

Name	Birth	Death	Notes
Prince Kiartikamchorn Kitiyakara	7 September 1896	18 February 1902	the first grandchild of King Chulalongkorn, died in childhood at age only 6
Prince Amorn Samarnluksana Kitiyakara	17 January 1897	14 August 1968	married Mom Pin Kitiyakara na Ayudhya, Mom Chao Chavalit Obhas Rabhibhat, and Mom Chao Chiraka Kitiyakara; had 3 sons and 3 daughters, died at age 71
Prince Nakkhatra Mangkala Kitiyakara	4 January 1898	11 February 1953	father of Queen Sirikit, later The Prince of Chanthaburi II Suranath, married Mom Luang Bua Sanitvongse; had 2 sons and 2 daughters, died at age 56
Princess Kamolpramoj Kitiyakara	5 December 1898	28 November 1974	married Mom Chao Marubara bhandhu Dhevakul and Mom Chao Vongsanuvatra Dhevakul; had issue, died at age 76
Prince Manojmanop Kitiyakara	24 January 1900	24 August 1901	died in childhood
Prince Kachornjob Kitikhun Kitiyakara	15 March 1901	28 January 1967	married Mom Rajawongse Vichitrachom Jayakura; had 2 sons, died at age 65
Princess Bibulaya Benchang Kitiyakara	13 November 1902	27 April 1969	married Prince Vanna Vaidhayakara, the Prince Naradhip Bongsaprabandh; had issue, died at age 66
Princess Kalyankasombati Kitiyakara	28 March 1904	4 February 1942	married Mom Chao Muradhrabhisek Sohnakul; had issue, died at age 37
Princess Chitra Banchong Kitiyakara	28 January 1906	29 October 1944	married Mom Rajawongse Nasatra Ladavalaya; had issue, died at age 37
Princess Songapsara Kitiyakara	22 July 1907	28 March 1988	married Mom Chao Plurng Nobbhadol Rabhibhat; had issue, died at age 81
Princess Sarada Chandra Kitiyakara	26 December 1908	30 September 1923	died young
Prince Pudh Kitiyakara	8 February 1911	26 December 1911	died in childhood

- Jon Vijayabhai (later Mom Jon Kitiyakara na Ayudhya); had 2 sons and 2 daughters

Name	Birth	Death	Notes
Princess Badhana Kanana Kitiyakara	30 September 1903	29 May 1966	married Prince Vivadhanajaya Jayanta, son of Prince Jayanta Monkol, the Prince Mahisara Rajaharudaya; had issue, died at age 63
Prince Samakhom Kitiyakara	15 September 1905	1 October 1988	married Mom Rajawongse Samaikarn Dhevakul; had 2 sons and 2 daughter (1 died infant), died at age 83
Princess Bhornbhibatra Kitiyakara	30 August 1907	7 February 1925	died in childhood
Prince Kitimati Kitiyakara	30 August 1915	27 January 1982	unmarried, died at age 67

- La-ong Vijarnbutra (later Mom La-ong Kitiyakara na Ayudhya); had 2 sons

Name	Birth	Death	Notes
Prince Chomchit Kitiyakara	16 October 1905	22 January 1948	unmarried, died at age 43
Prince Kolit Kitiyakara	13 July 1910	2 January 1976	married Princess Bhisidh Sobsamai; had 1 daughter, died at age 66

- Jun Intaketu (later Mom Jun Kitiyakara na Ayudhya); had 2 sons and a daughter

Name	Birth	Death	Notes
Princess Chiraka Kitiyakara	27 April 1913	8 November 1975	married her half-brother Mom Chao Amorn Samarnlaksana Kitiyakara; had issue, died at age 62
Prince Chirinanda Kitiyakara	26 February 1915	9 April 1973	married Somluksana Dhipsamai; had 2 sons and 2 daughters, died at age 58
Prince Chiridanaya Kitiyakara	1 December 1916	24 July 1981	married his half-sister Mom Chao Kitipapiya Kitiyakara; had a son, died at age 67

- Lamiet Plianprayul (later Mom Lamiet Kitiyakara na Ayudhya); had a son and 2 daughters

Name	Birth	Death	Notes
Princess Vinita Kitiyakara	2 December 1913	6 March 1998	married Mom Chao Vimvaditaya Rabhibhat; had issue, died at age 85
Prince Suvanit Kitiyakara	4 March 1915	9 April 1973	married Princess Suddha Sirisobha, daughter of Prince Chudadhuj Dharadilok, the Prince of Petchabun; had 2 daughter, died at age 65
Princess Kitipapiya Kitiyakara	6 December 1923	25 May 2012	married her half-brother, Mom Chao Chiridanaya Kitiyakara; had issue

== Royal decorations ==
Personal coat of arms of Kitiyakara Voralakshana

Prince Kitiyakara Voralaksana received the following decorations in the Honours System of Thailand (then Siam):

- Knight of The Ancient and Auspicious Order of the Nine Gems
- Knight of The Most Illustrious Order of the Royal House of Chakri
- Knight Grand Cordon (Special Class) of The Most Illustrious Order of Chula Chom Klao
- Knight Grand Commander (Senangapati) of the Honourable of the Order of Rama (1st class)
- Knight Grand Cordon (Special Class) of the Most Exalted Order of the White Elephant
- Knight Grand Cross (First Class) of the Most Noble Order of the Crown of Thailand
- The Ratana Varabhorn order of Merit
- King Rama V Royal Cypher Medal, Second Class
- King Rama VI Royal Cypher Medal, First Class
- King Rama VII Royal Cypher Medal, First Class
- Dushdi Mala

Kitiyakara Voralaksana House of Kitiyakara Cadet branch of the House of Chakri Born: 8 June 1874 Died: 27 May 1931
Political offices
Preceded by Phraya Suriyanuwat	Minister of Finance; 1907–1922	Succeeded by Suphayok Kasem
First	Minister of Commerce; 1920–1926	Succeeded by Purachatra Jayakara
