= Thanong Bidaya =

Thai politician

- ทนง พิทยะ
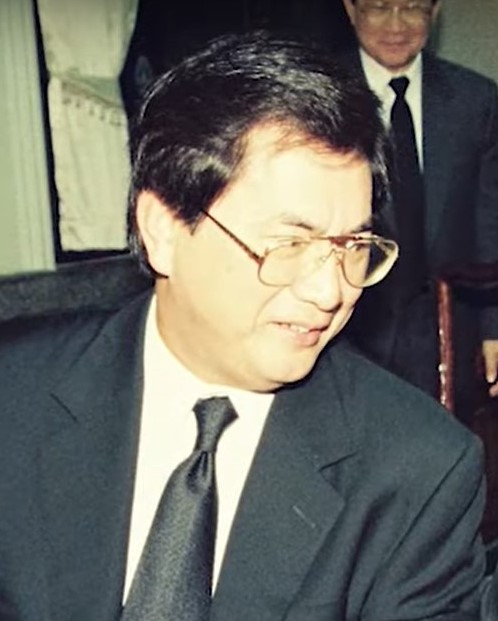

Minister of Finance
- In office 21 June 1997 – 24 October 1997
- Prime Minister: Chavalit Yongchaiyudh
- Preceded by: Amnuay Weerawan
- Succeeded by: Kosit Panpiemras
- In office 3 August 2005 – 19 September 2006
- Prime Minister: Thaksin Shinawatra
- Preceded by: Somkid Jatusripitak
- Succeeded by: Pridiyathorn Devakula

Minister of Commerce
- In office 11 March 2005 – 2 August 2005
- Prime Minister: Thaksin Shinawatra
- Preceded by: Somkid Jatusripitak
- Succeeded by: Watana Muangsook

Personal details
- Born: Thanong Lamyai; 28 July 1947 (age 79) Suphan Buri, Thailand
- Party: Thai Rak Thai Party
- Education: Yokohama National University; Northwestern University
- Profession: Economist; politician

Thanong Bidaya (Thai: ทนง พิทยะ; RTGS: Thanong Phitthaya; born 28 July 1947), born Thanong Lamyai, is a Thai politician and deposed finance minister. After the military overthrew the government of Thaksin Shinawatra, he remained in Singapore where he was attending the annual meeting of the World Bank/International Monetary Fund.

== Early life and education ==
Thanong was born in Suphanburi Province. He has four siblings, all of whom are teachers. Thanong was the only boy in his village to earn a bachelor's degree. He later earned a PhD.

== Academic and research career ==
Thanong became the Dean of the Graduate School of Business Administration or NIDA Business School, National Institute of Development Administration (NIDA). He also worked for a time as a researcher at the World Bank in Washington, D.C.

He later left his academic career for a career in business, citing insufficient income. From April to August 2007, Thanong was a visiting professor at the International Graduate School of Social Sciences, Yokohama National University, Japan.

== Business career ==
Thanong became president of Thai Military Bank.

== Political career ==
Thanong was invited by the government of Premier Chavalit Yongchaiyudh to be finance minister from June to October 1997, the height of the Asian financial crisis.

He served as finance minister in the government of Thaksin Shinawatra for a second term from August 2005 until the military coup of September 2006.

Political offices
Preceded by Amnuay Weerawan	Minister of Finance; 1997	Succeeded by Kosit Panpiemras
Preceded by Somkid Jatusripitak	Minister of Finance; 2005–2006	Succeeded by Pridiyathorn Devakula
