= Thaworn Senniam =

Thai politician

- ถาวร เสนเนียม
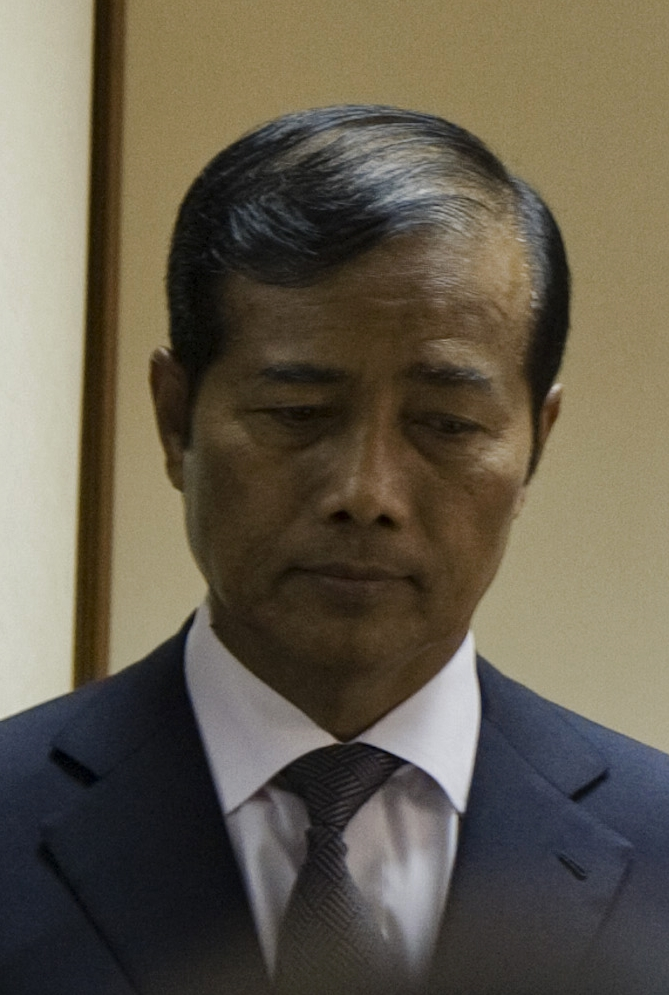
- Thaworn Senneam in 2010

Deputy Minister of Transport
- In office 10 July 2019 – 24 February 2021
- Prime Minister: Prayut Chan-o-cha
- Preceded by: Pailin Chuchottaworn
- Succeeded by: Weerasak Wangsuphakijkosol

Deputy Minister of Interior
- In office 20 December 2008 – 8 August 2011
- Prime Minister: Abhisit Vejjajiva
- Preceded by: Preecha Rengsomboonsuk; Prasong Kositanon
- Succeeded by: Chuchart Hansawat; Thanit Thienthong

Personal details
- Born: March 29, 1947 (age 79) Ranot, Songkhla, Thailand
- Party: United Thai Nation Party
- Other political affiliations: Democrat Party (1968–2021); Thai Pakdee Party (2022–2023)
- Spouse: Chantima Senniam
- Education: Thammasat University; The Thai bar; NIDA
- Profession: Politician; lawyer

Thaworn Senneam (Thai: ถาวร เสนเนียม, RTGS: Thawon Senniam; born 29 March 1947) is a Thai politician. He was former Deputy Minister of Interior in Abhisit Vejjajiva government from 2008 to 2011 and Deputy Minister of Transport from 2019 to 2021 in Prayut Chan-o-cha government. He has also served as Deputy Secretary-General of the Democrat Party.

== Education ==
Thaworn studied secondary level at Mahavajiravudh Songkhla School, then Faculty of Law, Thammasat University and becoming a barrister-at-law of the Thai Bar Association. He studied Master of Public Administration from the National Institute of Development Administration.

== Political career ==
Thaworn previously worked as a legal advisor to Democrat Party Secretary-General Sanan Kachornprasart. Thaworn was accused in 2006 of encouraging protestors to prevent small opposition candidates from running in Thailand's April general elections. The accusation was part of a larger election fraud case again the Democrats, their opponents the Thai Rak Thais, and several smaller political parties. The Constitutional Court of Thailand acquitted Thaworn and the Democrats of the charges, and ordered the dissolution of the Thai Rak Thai for conspiring to gain power by illegal means.

In 2013–2014 Thai political crisis he joined with People's Democratic Reform Committee to protests Yingluck Shinawatra government within Bangkok. He supervised the security of the assembly and liaising with other coalition groups.

In February 2021, he was found guilty of insurrection during protests that led to the 2014 coup d'état. He received a prison sentence of five years.

== See also ==
- Democrat Party (Thailand)
