= Ratanakorn =

Ratanakorn is a surname. Notable people with the surname include:

- Prasop Ratanakorn (1920–2012), Thai neurologist and psychologist
- Sophon Ratanakorn (1931–2018), Thai judge
- Vitai Ratanakorn, Thai banker
