= 2006 Thai interim civilian government =

The 2006 Thai interim civilian government is the Thai provisional civilian government headed by Interim Prime Minister General Surayud Chulanont. It was appointed on 1 October 2006 by the Council for National Security, the initial post-coup interim military government led by General Sonthi Boonyaratglin, which had overthrown the government of Thaksin Shinawatra in a coup on 19 September 2006. The interim government operated under an interim constitution, promulgated that same day.

== Background ==
On 19 September 2006 the Thai military staged a coup against the government of Prime Minister Thaksin Shinawatra, suspended the Constitution, cancelled upcoming elections, and dissolved Parliament. The junta later appointed General Surayud Chulanont as Prime Minister of an interim civilian government, promulgated an interim charter, and changed its name to the council for National Security.

== Composition ==
=== Selection of the Prime Minister ===
==== Unselected candidate: Chatumongol Sonakul ====
After the coup, Air Chief Marshal Chalit Pookpasuk, CDRM vice-president, said that more than five candidates were being considered for the post of interim prime minister, though none of them had been approached yet. Chalit said the CDRM would favour a lawyer since political reform is the priority of the CDRM's goal. Economists could be brought in as cabinet ministers to take charge of national economy.

Former central bank governor Mom Rajawongse Chatumongol Sonakul was tipped as interim prime minister because he is knowledgeable about economic issues. Some CDRM leaders had reservations about Chatumongol, who gained a reputation for being outspoken and intolerant during his long years as a technocrat at the Finance Ministry and Bank of Thailand (BoT). Chatumongol previously served as the permanent secretary for finance from 1 October 1995 to 28 July 1997 and was dismissed by the Chavalit Yongchaiyudh government. Named on 7 May 1998, governor of the Bank of Thailand by Tarrin Nimmanhaeminda, Chuan Leekpai government's finance minister, Chatumongol was later sacked on 30 May 2001 by the Thaksin Shinawatra government.

==== Unselected candidate: Ackaratorn Chularat ====
Ackaratorn Chularat, president of the Supreme Administrative Court, was always considered unlikely to be named interim prime minister because his knowledge of economics is regarded as limited, and he is not widely known in the international community.

==== Unselected candidate: Pridiyathorn Devakula ====
M.R. Pridiyathorn Devakula, at the time the current governor of the BoT, has the banking and business community's favour, and was seen as a strong contender.

==== Unselected candidate: Supachai Panitchpakdi ====
Supachai Panitchpakdi (Secretary-General of the United Nations Conference on Trade and Development) was also previously rumored to have been short-listed for the post.

==== Selected candidate: General (ret.) Surayud Chulanont ====
Privy Councilor and former boss of junta leader Sonthi Boonyaratkalin Surayud Chulanont also emerged as a strong candidate for Premier. Panithan Wattanayakorn of Chulalongkorn University called Surayud the most feasible choice, noting that "He is also recognised internationally. Time magazine ran a story about him on its front page once and dubbed him an Asian hero." Suriyasai Katasila, leader of the People's Alliance for Democracy also said that Surayud was the strongest candidate. Privy Council President Gen Prem Tinsulanonda, Surayud's former boss, was seen to be in a cheerful mood after reports gained ground that Gen Surayud might be named interim prime minister. During a nationally televised press conference General Sondhi Boonyaratkalin reaffirmed wanting to install a new civilian prime minister "as soon as possible" but was still narrowing down candidates for the job. He did not rule out a former soldier for the temporary role, "When you say civilian prime minister, you will see that soldiers after they retire can be called civilians," hinting at the former Army commander Surayud.

On 1 October, the military junta officially named Surayud as interim Prime Minister. The leaders also announced an interim constitution to take effect immediately until a new permanent constitution is drafted and signed by the King of Thailand. This temporary charter includes provisions giving amnesty for the military junta and all others under its command.

=== Selection of government ministers ===
There was early speculation after the coup that junta leaders have approached former senator Kraisak Chonhavan to serve as Foreign Minister in the interim government.

== Cabinet ==
Surayud 1/1 - The cabinet sworn in by the King on 9 October 2006.

Portfolio	Minister
Prime Minister	General Surayud Chulanont
Deputy Prime Minister	M.R. Pridiyathorn Devakula
Deputy Prime Minister	Mr. Kosit Panpiemras
Minister attached to the Prime Minister's Office	Khunying Dhipavadee Meksawan
Minister attached to the Prime Minister's Office	Mr. Thirapat Serirangsan
Minister of Agriculture and Cooperatives	Mr. Thira Sutabut
Deputy Minister of Agriculture and Cooperatives	Mr. Rungrueng Issararangkul Na Ayutthaya
Minister of Commerce	Mr. Krirkkrai Jirapaet
Minister of Culture	Khunying Khaisri Sri-aroon
Minister of Defence	General Boonrawd Somtat
Minister of Education	Mr. Wijit Srisa-arn
Minister of Energy	Mr. Piyasvasti Amranand
Minister of Finance	M.R. Pridiyathorn Devakula
Minister of Industry	Mr. Kosit Panpiemras
Deputy Minister of Industry	Mr. Piyabutr Cholwicharn
Minister of Interior	Mr. Aree Wong-araya
Deputy Minister of Interior	Mr. Banyat Chansena
Minister of Justice	Mr. Charnchai Likitjitta
Minister of Foreign Affairs	Mr. Nitya Pibulsonggram
Deputy Minister of Foreign Affairs	Mr. Sawanit Kongsiri
Minister of Information and Communication Technology	Mr. Sitthichai Pokai-udom
Minister of Labour	Mr. Apai Chanthanajulaka
Minister of Natural Resource and Environment	Mr. Kasem Sanitwong Na Ayutthaya
Minister of Public Health	Mr. Mongkol Na Songkhla
Minister of Science and Technology	Mr. Yongyuth Yuthawongse
Minister of Social Development and Human Security	Mr. Paiboon Wattanasiritham
Minister of Tourism and Sports	Mr. Suwit Yodmanee
Minister of Transport	Admiral Thira Haocharoen
Deputy Minister of Transport	Mr. Sansern Wongcha-um

Surayud 1/2 - Two ministers have been added to the Cabinet. The two new ministers have been appointed and sworn in on 18 November 2006.

Portfolio	Minister
Minister attached to the Prime Minister's Office	Mr. Prasit Kovilaikul
Deputy Minister of Finance	Mr. Sommai Phasee

Surayud 1/3 - Two ministers have been added to the Cabinet. The two new ministers have been appointed and sworn in on 2 February 2007.

Portfolio	Minister
Deputy Minister of Commerce	Mrs. Oranuch Osathanugroh
Deputy Minister of Education	Mr. Varakorn Samkoset

Surayud 1/4 - One minister announced his resignation, one minister received additional responsibility and three ministers have been added to the Cabinet. The resigned minister announced his resignation on 28 February 2007, effective the following day. The minister (received additional responsibility) and the new three new ministers have been appointed and sworn in on 7 March 2007.

Portfolio	Minister
Resignation from Deputy Prime Minister and Minister of Finance	M.R. Pridiyathorn Devakula
Deputy Prime Minister	Mr. Paiboon Wattanasiritham
Minister of Finance	Mr. Chalongpob Susangkarn
Deputy minister of Social Development and Human Security	Mr. Poldej Pinprateep
Deputy minister of Public Health	Mr. Morakot Kornkasem

On 21 May 2007, One minister resigned from the cabinet, for health reasons.

Portfolio	Minister
Resignation from Minister attached to the Prime Minister's Office	Mr. Prasit Kovilaikul

On September/October 2007, Five members of the Cabinet resigned after named by the National Counter Corruption Commission as holding company shares of over 5 percent, which is in violation with the 2000 anti-graft law.

Portfolio	Minister
Resignation from Minister of Information and Communication Technology	Mr. Sitthichai Pokai-udom
Resignation from Deputy Minister of Commerce	Mrs. Oranuch Osathanugroh
Resignation from Minister of Interior	Mr. Aree Wong-araya
Resignation from Deputy Minister of Foreign Affairs	Mr. Sawanit Kongsiri
Resignation from Minister of Natural Resource and Environment	Mr. Kasem Sanitwong Na Ayutthaya

Surayud 1/5 - After five ministers resigned cabinet, one minister received additional responsibility and one minister has been added to the Cabinet. The new minister has been appointed and sworn in on 2 October 2007. The minister who received additional responsibility has been appointed and sworn in on 3 October 2007. Additional responsibilities were given to current ministers.

Portfolio	Minister
Minister of Interior	General Surayud Chulanont
Deputy Prime Minister	General Sonthi Boonyaratglin
Acting Minister of Information and Communication Technology	Mr. Kosit Panpiemras
Acting Minister of Natural Resource and Environment	Mr. Yongyuth Yuthawongse

=== Civil service appointments ===
On Wednesday 27 September the Judicial Commission chaired by Supreme Court President Charnchai Likhitchittha approved the promotion of Jaral Pakdeekul, Secretary-General of the Supreme Court President, to become the Permanent Secretary for Justice Ministry. Jaral replaced retiring Permanent Secretary Charupong Ruangsuwan.

== Role of the junta ==
On Tuesday, 26 September 2006, junta leader Sonthi Boonyaratglin said that the junta would remain in place after the appointment of an interim civilian government, noting "It's necessary to keep the council so that there is no loophole for the executive branch."

Following general elections and the establishment of a new civilian government, the junta would be dissolved and replaced by a permanent "Council of National Security" (CNS) whose future role in Thai politics has not yet been explained. It was later revealed that the interim charter would give the junta significant control over the interim civilian government.

- The junta would appoint the Prime Minister and would sit in Cabinet meetings
- The junta would appoint the entire legislature
- The junta would appoint a 2,000 person National Assembly, which would name 200 candidates for a 100-person "Constitutional Drafting Committee". This committee would in turn select 25 members to write a permanent constitution, in addition to 10 persons directly appointed by the Junta.

== Parliament ==
The government worked with a junta-appointed parliament. The 242-member legislature was widely criticized for being dominated by military leaders. Critics called it a "rubber stamp", a "chamber of generals" full of "[Privy Councilor President and key coup backer] Prem's sons."

== International response ==
While US$24 million (Bt902 million) was in suspended military assistance, United States Ambassador to Thailand Ralph Boyce met with Prime Minister Surayud Chulanont in what was billed as a gesture of goodwill by a key ally on Surayud first day at the office.
