= Ammar Siamwalla =

Thai economist (1939–2025)

- อัมมาร สยามวาลา
- Born: 29 May 1939
- Died: October 2025 (aged 86)
- Education: Harvard University
- Occupation: Economist

Ammar Siamwalla (Thai: อัมมาร สยามวาลา, RTGS: Amman Sayamwala; 29 May 1939 – October 2025) was a Thai economist, known as an expert in Thailand's rice policy. He was a founding member of the policy think tank the Thailand Development Research Institute (TDRI), and served as its president from 1990 to 1995.

== Background ==
Ammar was born to Tahir and Khadija Siamwalla. His father Tahir was a son of Dilawer Husain Abdulali Siamwalla, His mother Khadija was a Shi'a Muslim, also from Baroda. Ammar is the youngest of three sons.

He attended Assumption College in Bangkok, and went on to receive a B.Sc. in economics from the London School of Economics and a PhD in economics from Harvard University.

Siamwalla died in October 2025, at the age of 86.

== Career ==
Ammar began his career as an assistant professor and research staff economist at the Department of Economics, Yale University before moving to the Faculty of Economics of Thammasat University as a Rockefeller scholar on the advice of Puey Ungpakorn who was then dean of faculty.

He was a visiting professor at the Food Research Institute of Stanford University as well as a research fellow with the International Food Policy Research Institute in Washington, D.C.

He was a founding member of the Thailand Development Research Institute (TDRI), serving first as program director for agriculture and rural development and then as its president from 1990 to 1995. Following his tenure, he held the title of distinguished scholar at the TDRI.

Ammar was an expert in Thai rice policy, Thai agricultural economics, and development economics. He has been described as "one of the country's top technocrats". His work together with Suthad Setboonsarng formed the definitive study of Thailand's agricultural price policy in the 1980s.

Ammar was also appointed member of the National Legislative Assembly following the 2006 coup d'état.

== Publications ==
- The Thai Rural Credit System: Public Subsidies, Private Information, and Segmented Markets
- A HISTORY OF RICE POLICIES IN THAILAND
