= Tarisa Watanagase =

Thai central banker

- ธาริษา วัฒนเกส
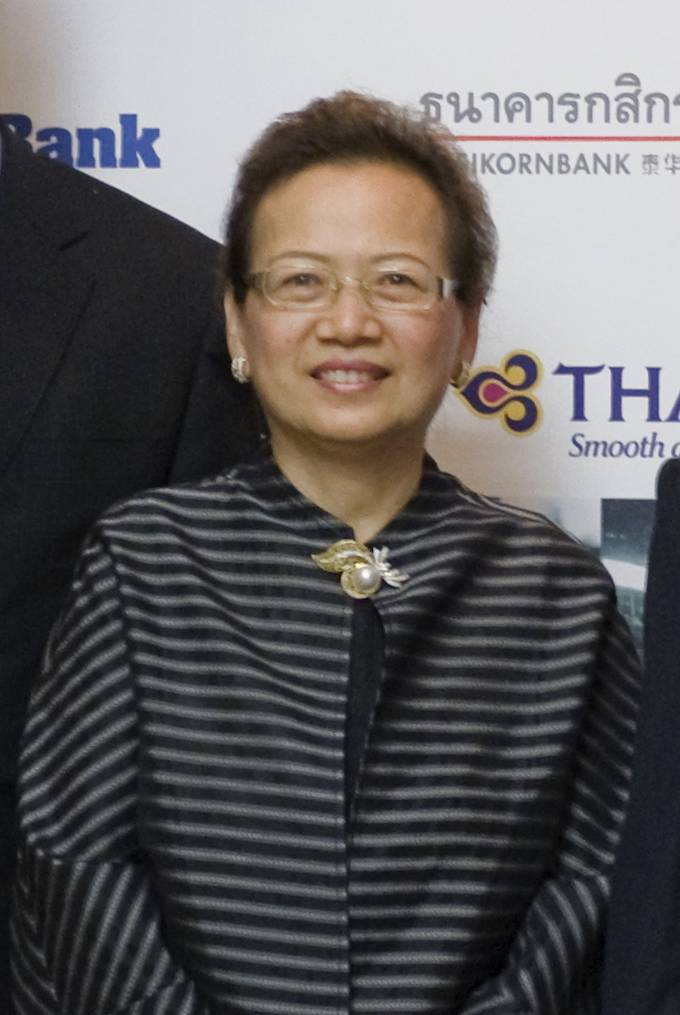
- Tarisa Watanagase in 2010

Governor of the Bank of Thailand
- In office 8 October 2006 – 30 September 2010
- Preceded by: Pridiyathorn Devakula
- Succeeded by: Prasarn Trairatvorakul

Personal details
- Born: 30 November 1949 (age 76) Bangkok, Thailand
- Education: Keio University; Washington University in St. Louis
- Profession: Economist

Tarisa Watanagase (Thai: ธาริษา วัฒนเกส, RTGS: Tharisa Watthanaket, [tʰāːrísǎː wáttʰánákèːt]; born 30 November 1949) is a former governor of the Bank of Thailand (2006–2010). She succeeded Pridiyathorn Devakula, who was appointed finance minister in the interim government. Tarisa was an assistant governor of the BoT and is the first female governor in the bank's 64-year history.

== Education and career ==
An economist, Tarisa joined the central bank in 1975. She was appointed deputy governor in 1992. She graduated from Triam Udom Suksa School. She received a bachelor of economics and master of economics from Keio University, Tokyo, Japan and a doctor of economics from Washington University in St. Louis, United States. She attended the six-week Advanced Management Program at Harvard University. She served as an economist at the International Monetary Fund from 1988 to 1990. She speaks Thai, English, Japanese.

Government offices
Preceded by Pridiyathorn Devakula	Governor of the Bank of Thailand; 2006-2010	Succeeded by Prasarn Trairatvorakul
