= Vitai Ratanakorn =

- วิทัย รัตนากร
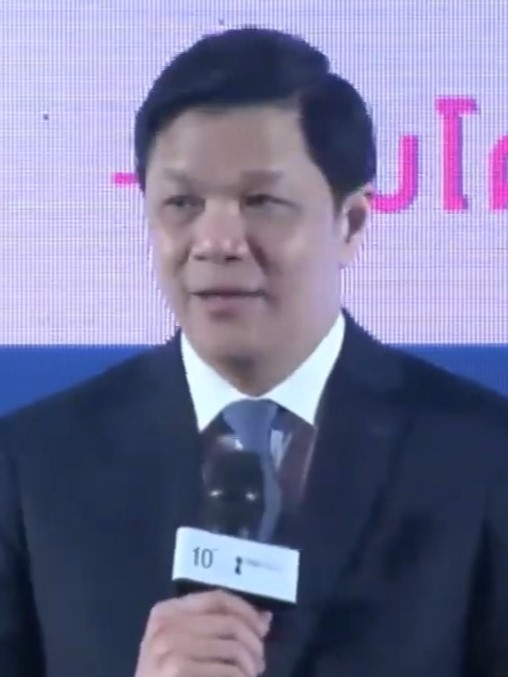
- Ratanakorn in 2020

22nd Governor of the Bank of Thailand
- Incumbent
- Assumed office 1 October 2025
- Preceded by: Sethaput Suthiwartnarueput

Personal details
- Parent: Sophon Ratanakorn (father)
- Education: Thammasat University; Chulalongkorn University; Drexel University

Vitai Ratanakorn (Thai: วิทัย รัตนากร) is a Thai banker currently serving as the 22nd Governor of the Bank of Thailand, effective 1 October 2025. He was previously President and CEO of the Government Savings Bank.

== Early life and education ==
Ratanakorn is the son of Sophon Ratanakorn, a former Permanent Secretary of the Ministry of Justice, and Sirilak Ratanakorn, the first female Managing Director of the Stock Exchange of Thailand from 1982 to 1985. He earned a bachelor’s degree in economics from Thammasat University, a master’s degree in political economy and a master's degree in business law from Chulalongkorn University, and a master’s degree in finance from Drexel University.

== Career ==
=== Bank of Thailand ===
On 22 July 2025, Vitai was named the next Governor, prevailing over Deputy Governor Roong Poshyananda Mallikamas. His nomination is pending royal approval. Vitai is seen as an advocate for interest rate cuts.
