= Thammasat University =

Public university in Bangkok, Thailand

- มหาวิทยาลัยธรรมศาสตร์
- Former names: University of Moral and Political Sciences
- Motto: For excellence, for justice, and readiness in leadership
- Type: National autonomous public university
- Established: 27 June 1934; 92 years ago
- Founder: Pridi Banomyong
- Affiliations: ASAIHL; GMSARN; LAOTSE
- Budget: 17,444,989,498.60 Baht (2023)
- Rector: Supasawad Chardchawarn
- Royal conferrer: King Vajiralongkorn
- Academic staff: 2,082
- Students: 39,952 (2nd term, AY2023)
- Undergraduates: 34,701
- Postgraduates: 5,251
- Location: Phra Nakhon, Bangkok, Thailand; 13°45′27″N 100°29′24″E
- Campus: Tha Phra Chan; Rangsit Centre; Lampang Centre; Pattaya Centre
- Anthem: "Yung Thong" ('Golden Flamboyant')
- Colors: Yellow and Red
- Mascot: Flamboyant Tree
- Website: www.tu.ac.th

Thammasat University (Thai: มหาวิทยาลัยธรรมศาสตร์, lit. 'The University of Jurisprudence', RTGS: Mahawitthayalai Thammasat; TU; Thai: มธ) is a public university in Thailand with campuses in the Tha Phra Chan area of Bangkok, Rangsit, Pattaya and Lampang.

Thammasat University is Thailand's second oldest university. Officially established to be the national university of Thailand on 27 June 1934, it was named by its founder, Pridi Banomyong, the University of Moral and Political Sciences (Thai: มหาวิทยาลัยวิชาธรรมศาสตร์และการเมือง; RTGS: Mahawitthayalai Wicha Thammasat Lae Kanmueang). It began as an open university, with 7,094 students studying law and politics in its first year.

In 1960, the university ended its free-entry policy and became the first in Thailand to require passing national entrance examinations for admission. Thammasat today offers more than 240 academic programmes in 33 different faculties and colleges on four campuses. Over the 80 years since its foundation, Thammasat University has evolved from an open university for law and politics to an international university offering all levels of academic degrees in many fields and disciplines. It has graduated more than 300,000 undergraduate and graduate students. The university's alumni have included some of Thailand's prime ministers, leading politicians, governmental figures, Bank of Thailand governors, and jurists. As of 2024, Thammasat University has about 39,000 students enrolled in 33 faculties, colleges, institutes and 2,000 academic staff.

Tha Phra Chan Campus, the original campus of the university, is in Phra Nakhon, Bangkok. The campus is in close proximity to many tourist destinations and was the site of the 14 October 1973 uprising and the 6 October 1976 massacre. Rangsit campus, where most undergraduate programmes are concentrated, is in Khlong Luang, Pathum Thani. Thammasat has smaller regional campuses in Lampang and Pattaya.

== History ==
The name "Thammasat" derives from the Buddhist-term Dhammasattha, meaning "study of law".

=== University of Law and Political Sciences ===
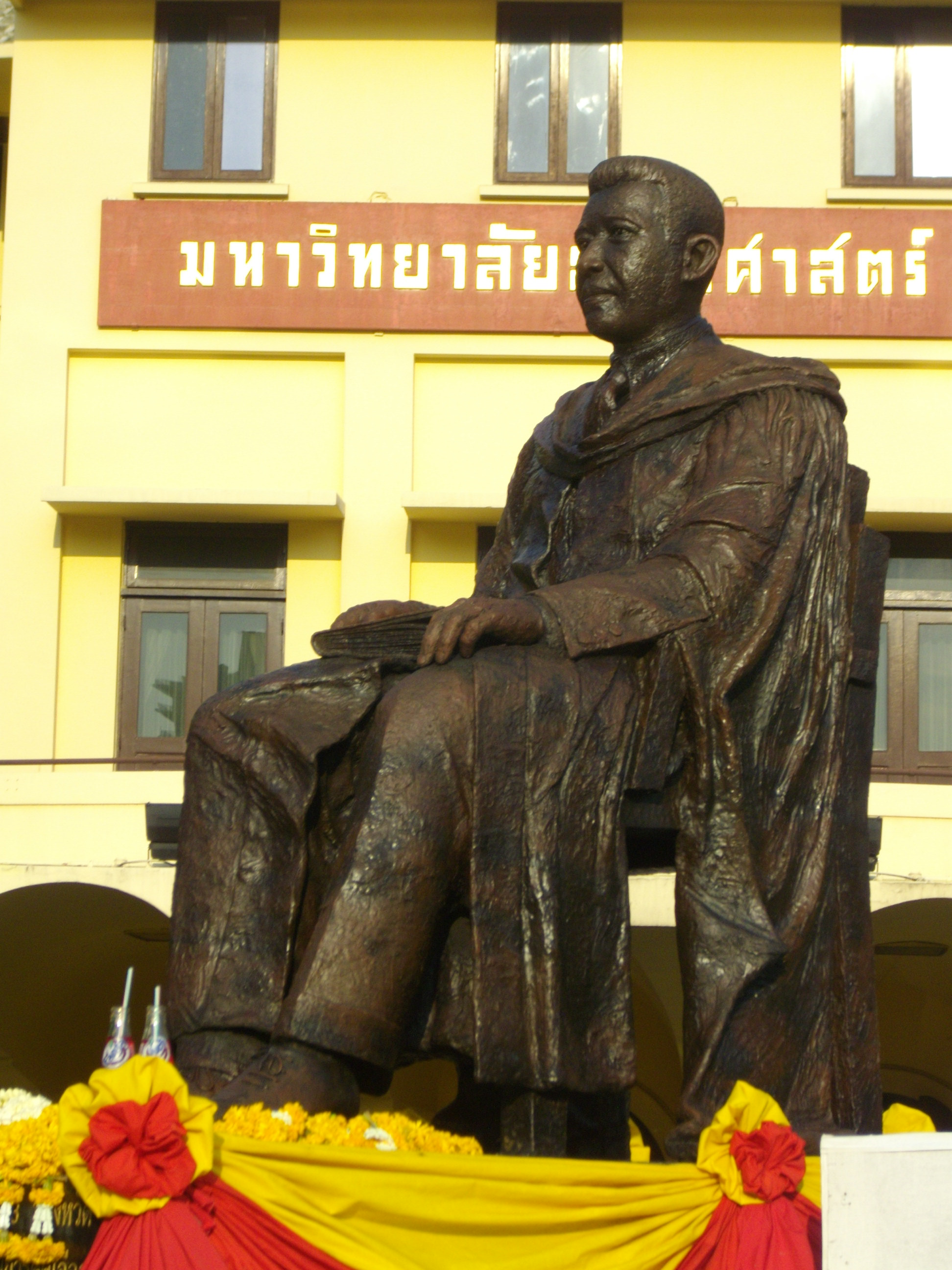
Pridi Banomyong monument, Tha Phra Chan Campus

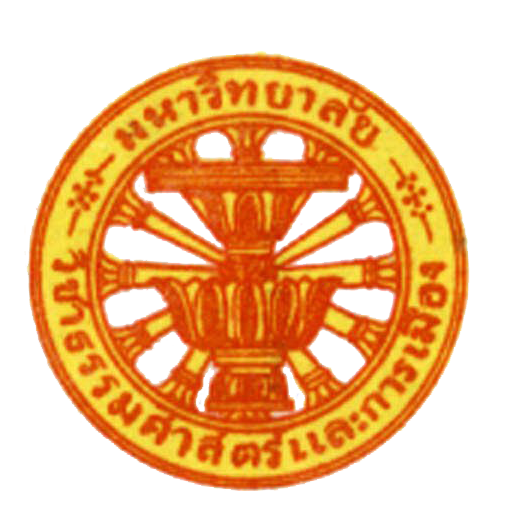
University of Law and Political Sciences logo

Thammasat University began in 1934 as the University of Law and Political Sciences. This was two years after the so-called Siamese revolution of 1932 and eighteen years after the founding of Chulalongkorn University by transforming the law school of Prince Raphi Phatthanasak Krommaluang Ratcha Buri Direk Rit, which dated back to 1907. Thammasat University was the brainchild of Pridi Banomyong, the father of Thailand's democracy and the minister of interior, who drafted the "University of Law and Political Science Act 1934". The university was inaugurated on 27 June 1934, and Pridi served as the university's first chancellor.

The university is based on the sixth principle of the People's Party. The first announcement of Khana Ratsadon stated the government "must provide the people with full education" because people "lack education, which is reserved for royals". The desire of students at the school of law to be upgraded to a university rather than simply a department at Chulalongkorn University also helped Thammasat University become the successor of the law school. The property and faculty of the law school were transferred to University of Law and Political Science, and the old law school building was the first Thammasat site. The university moved to Tha Phra Chan campus the following year.

When the university opened, 7,094 people applied for admission. At that time, Chulalongkorn University was graduating only 68 students a year. Thammasat initially offered a bachelor's degree with an emphasis on legal studies and previously banned economics and political science, plus a bachelor's degree equivalent diploma in accountancy. Master's degree courses soon followed in law, political science, and economics, and doctoral degree courses in law, political science, economics, and diplomacy.

During its early years, the university did not rely on government funding, but instead relied on its low tuition fees and interest paid by the Bank of Asia for Industry and Commerce, in which the university had an 80% stake.

Under Pridi's leadership, the university became the clandestine headquarters of the Free Thai anti-Japanese underground during the Second World War. Ironically, the university campus also functioned as an internment camp for Allied civilians, with Thai guards more or less protecting them from abuses by the occupying Japanese. The internment camp was where the Multipurpose Building now stands.

=== Reform ===
The coup d'état on 8 November 1947 marked the end of an era. Pridi Banomyong left the country and went into exile. The original Thammasat degree was replaced by specialised departments in 1949, when the Faculties of Law, Political Science, Commerce and Accountancy, and Economics were founded. The university was forced to sell its bank shares, thus becoming dependent on government funding. The words "and Political Sciences" were removed from its name, and Thammasat was no longer an open university. A new "Thammasat University Act" was passed in 1952. Thammasat added four more faculties during the 1950s and 1960s: social administration, journalism and mass communication, liberal arts, and sociology and anthropology.

=== Bloody October protests ===
In 1973, Thammasat became the centre of the pro-democracy protest movement that led to the bloody uprising on 14 October. A large crowd, led by university students, assembled at Thammasat University to protest the arrest of thirteen pro-democracy student activists. The protest continued for several days before a bloody confrontation took place at the Democracy Monument. When Thailand's military leaders fled into exile, Sanya Dharmasakti, then Thammasat rector, was appointed Prime Minister of Thailand.

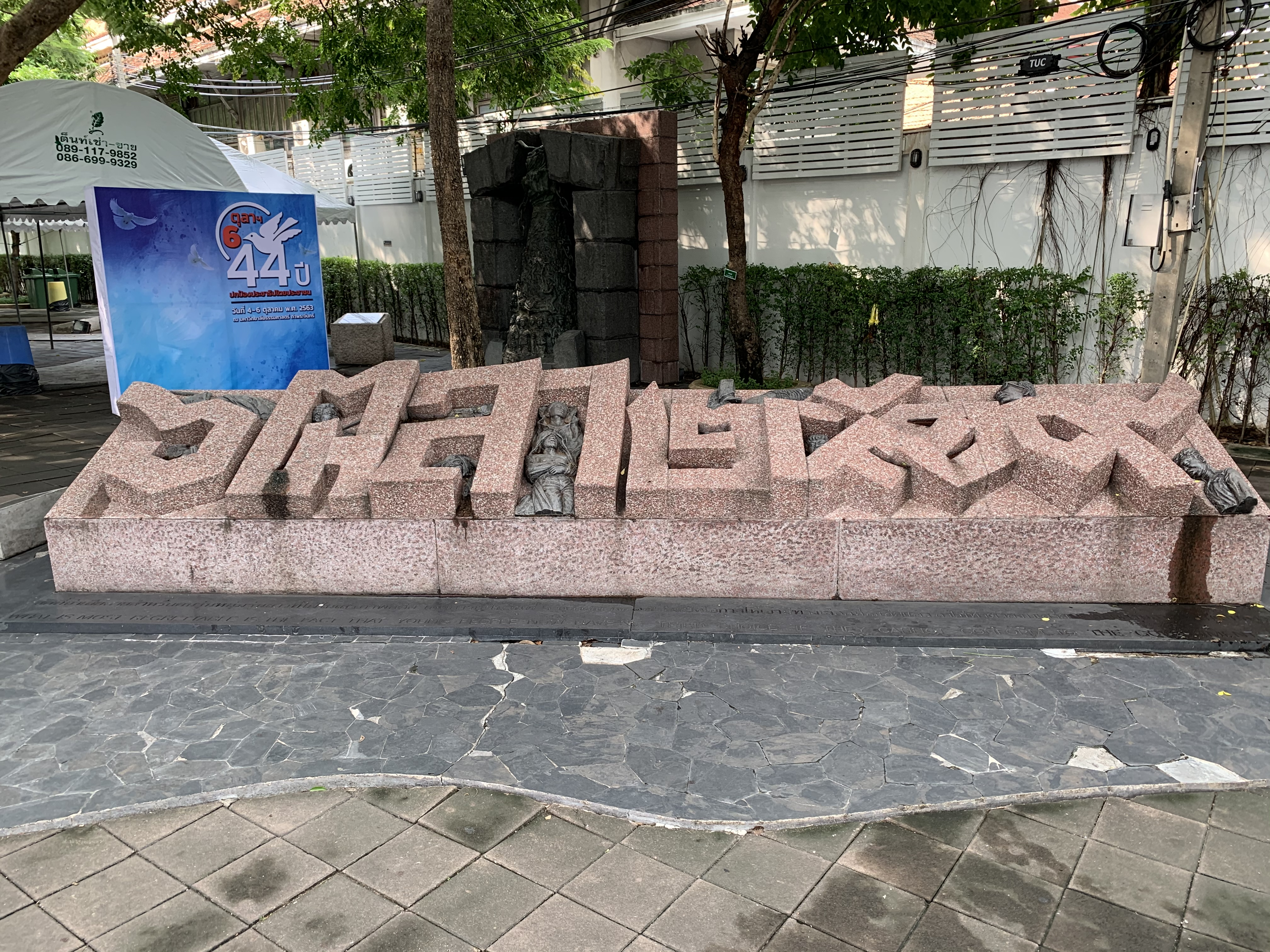
6 October Memorial, Tha Phra Chan

Three years later, the 6 October 1976 massacre took place on the Tha Phra Chan campus. The event began with protests against the return of exiled dictator Thanom Kittikachorn. Violence first appeared on 25 September when two EGAT employees who handed out protest literature in Nakhon Pathom were branded "communists", beaten to death, and their bodies hung from a wall. This led to peaceful protests by labor groups, students, and other activists demanding the expulsion of Thanom.

On 4 October, students staged a play on the Thammasat campus to dramatize the hanging of the protesters in Nakhon Pathom. Several newspapers printed photographs of the mock hanging with one of the students retouched to resemble Crown Prince Vajiralongkorn, an act of lèse-majesté. Uniformed police and enraged right-wing paramilitary groups promptly surrounded Thammasat University. At dawn on 6 October the police and paramilitary groups attacked the protesters. The assault continued for several hours. Newspaper sources reported the number killed as between 43 and 46, but the actual figure may have been over a hundred, with several hundred more injured. Many student protesters escaped by jumping into Chao Phraya River, where they were shot at by the Royal Thai Navy.

One of the student leaders was Seksan Prasertkul, who wrote the protest song Su mai toi, which was adopted by the 2013-2014 anti-government protesters in Thailand. Seksan is now (2016) a lecturer at Thammasat University.

=== Expansion ===
During the 1980s, Thammasat University built a new campus at Rangsit to house the new Faculty of Science and Technology. It accepted its first students in 1985. The Faculty of Engineering opened at Rangsit in 1989, followed by the Faculty of Medicine in 1990. By the late-1990s, all first year students were studying at Rangsit. At present almost all undergraduate classes are taught at Rangsit, the exceptions being some international English language programmes and some special programmes. Graduate degree classes are still taught at Tha Phra Chan.

The Rangsit campus was chosen as one of the venues for the 1998 Asian Games.

Thammasat University is a member of "Links to Asia by Organizing Traineeship and Student Exchange" (LAOTSE), a network of universities in Europe and Asia. Regional cooperation is maintained by means of the Greater Mekong Sub-region Academic and Research Network.

== Seal ==
The seal depicts the centerpiece of the Democracy Monument, Bangkok, which itself honours the Thai Constitution of 1932. It is superimposed on a Dhammacakka, or 'wheel of law', symbolising the Dharmaśāstra, the university's name in Sanskrit.

== Campuses ==
Thammasat University has two campuses in the Bangkok Metropolitan Area, Tha Phra Chan and Rangsit. There are two regional campuses: Lampang and Pattaya.

=== Tha Phra Chan ===
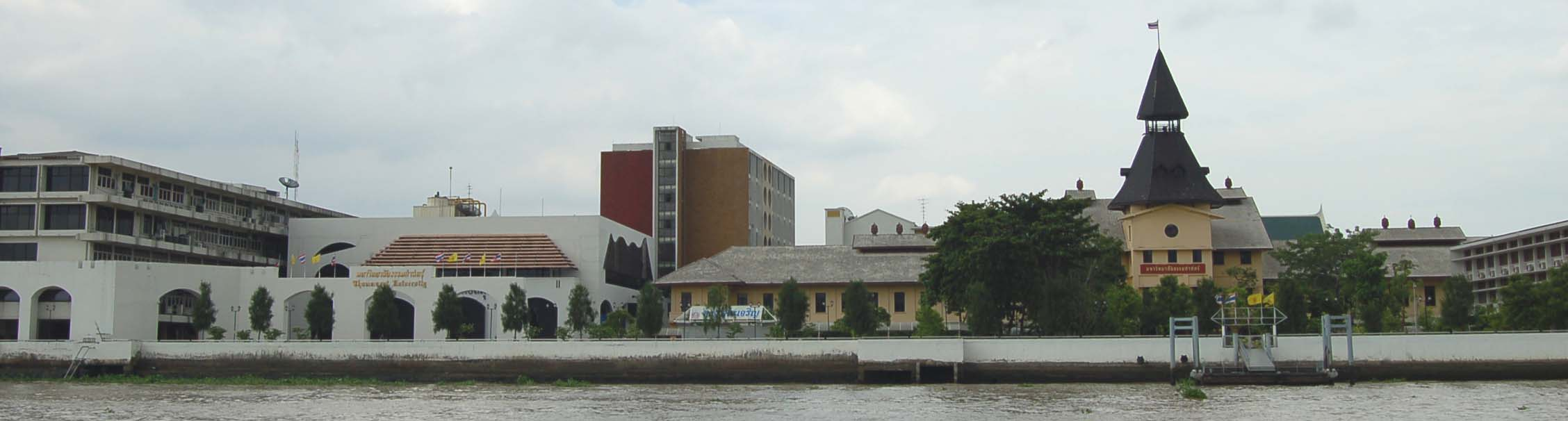
Tha Phra Chan campus across the Chao Phraya River

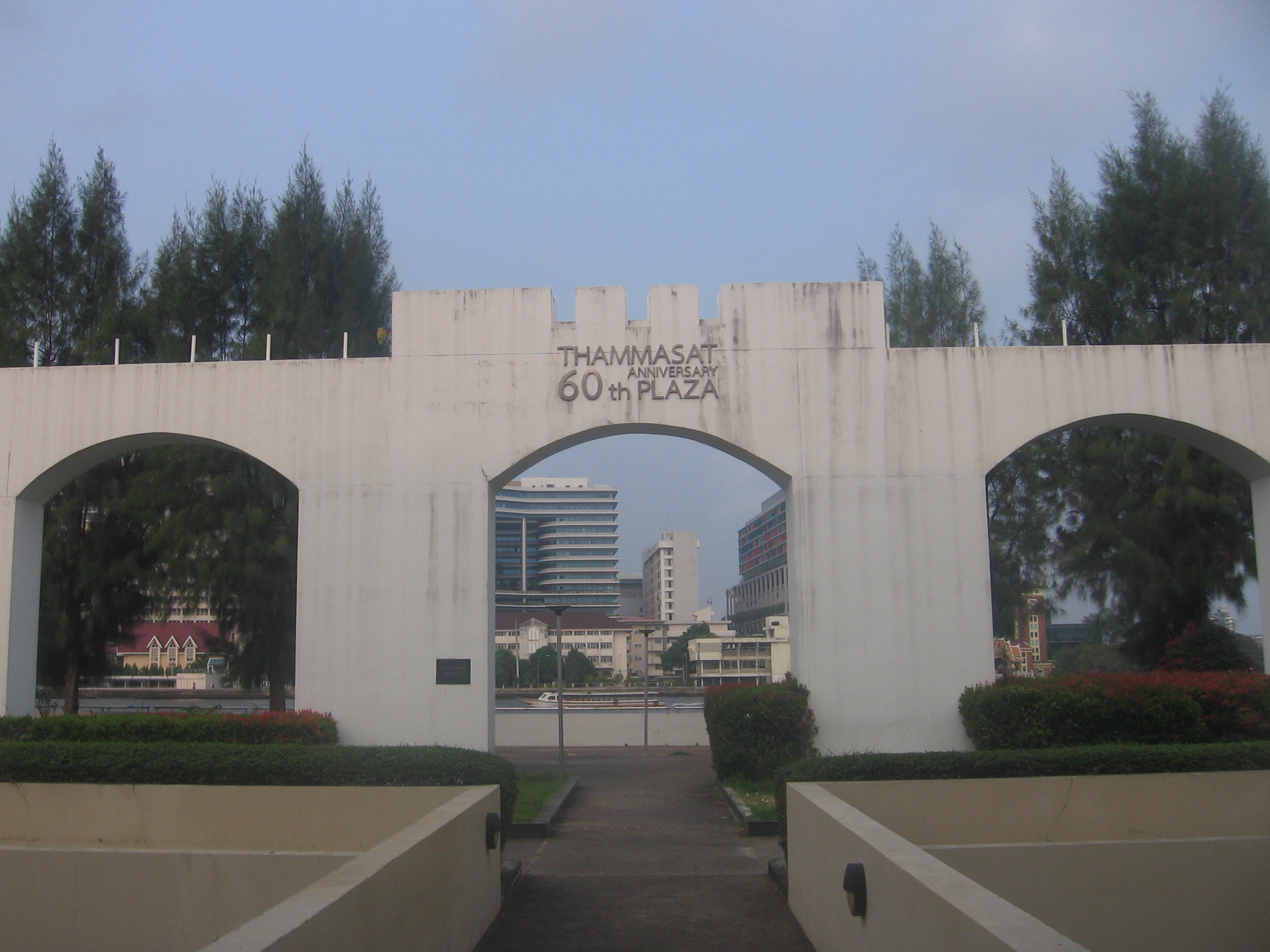
Thammasat 60th Anniversary Plaza

Tha Phra Chan Centre (Thai: ศูนย์ท่าพระจันทร์) is in Phra Nakhon District, Bangkok, surrounded by many of Thailand's most famous cultural and historical landmarks, such as Sanam Luang, the Grand Palace, the Temple of the Emerald Buddha, the Bangkok National Museum, the National Theatre, Wat Mahathat Yuwaratrangsarit, and the Chao Phraya River. It was the first permanent campus of Thammasat, purchased from the military with public donations in 1935. The site had originally been part of the Front Palace of the deputy king (formerly the designated heir to the throne).

The signature building of the university is the Dome, the original Tha Phra Chan campus building. It was constructed from four existing military buildings. The Dome housed Pridi Banomyong's office as well as being the command centre of the Free Thai Movement during the Second World War. Late in the war, when an uprising against the occupying Japanese was planned, weapons were concealed in the attic.

The Tha Phra Chan campus played a role in the uprising against the military regime on 14 October 1973 and was the site of the 6 October 1976 Massacre.

Eight faculties are based at the Tha Phra Chan campus: law, political science, economics, commerce and accountancy, liberal arts, social administration, journalism and mass communication, and sociology and anthropology. As of 2019, only postgraduate programmes, integrated bachelor's and master's programmes, and the English-language international programmes are offered at Tha Phra Chan (except those in engineering, health sciences, and journalism which are at the Rangsit Center). Thammasat Tha Phra Chan offers a Thai Language courses for foreigners. Tha Phra Chan facilities include a football field, a track, a gymnasium, eight libraries, and several cafeterias.

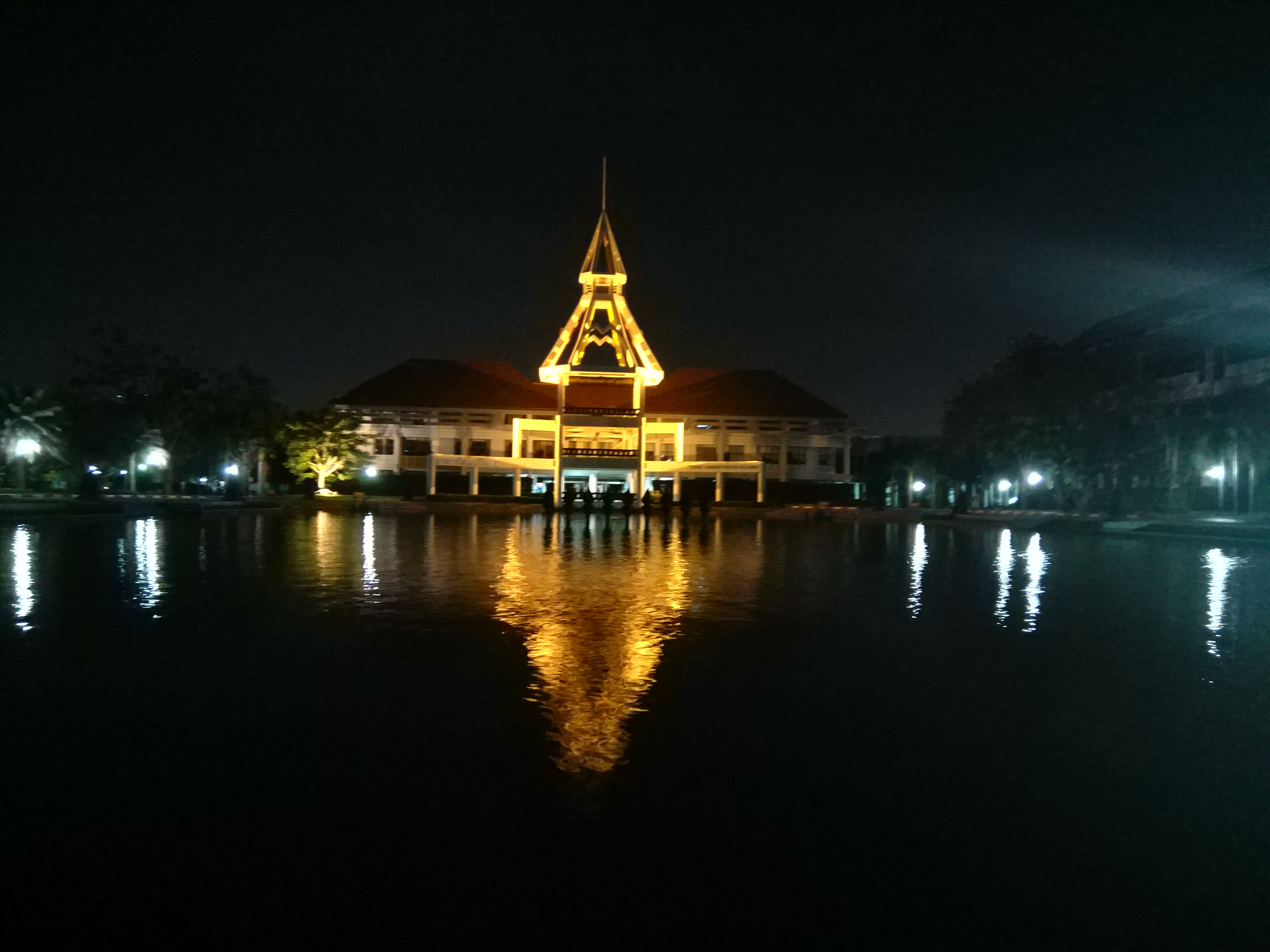
Dome Administration Building, Rangsit

=== Rangsit ===
Rangsit Centre (Thai: ศูนย์รังสิต) is the second and largest Thammasat campus. It is in Khlong Luang District, Pathum Thani Province, 42 km north of Bangkok, connected Tha Phra Chan by shuttle bus. Thammasat University instituted degree programmes in engineering, technologies, physical sciences, and medicine at its Rangsit Centre in the 1980s and 1990s. Although established only for the science and technology-related faculties, all bachelor's degrees have been taught here since 2006. All faculties (except the College of Innovation, the College of Interdisciplinary Studies, and the Pridi Banomyong International College) are at Rangsit. The campus houses the Sirindhorn International Institute of Technology, an international academic institute attached to Thammasat which emphasizes engineering and technological research and education. International programmes in engineering, health sciences, and journalism are also taught at Rangsit Centre. The Thailand Science Park (National Research Centre) and the Asian Institute of Technology are also located here.

The campus divided into three areas: the academic zone, the housing zone, and various sport facilities. The Thammasat University Sport Centre, on the Rangsit campus, was used in the 1998 Asian Games, 1999 FESPIC Games and in the 2007 Summer Universiade.

In December 2019, the Rangsit campus opened Asia's largest urban rooftop garden. The 7,000 m^{2} space, designed by Kotchakorn Voraakhom, is designed to help offset some of the impacts of climate change, such as flooding. "Urban rooftop farms are an easy and effective climate solution, and should be the norm.", she said. The rooftop farm is open to anyone who wishes to grow rice, vegetables, or herbs according to the university.

=== Branch campuses ===
Pattaya Centre (Thai: ศูนย์พัทยา), is in Pattaya, Bang Lamung District, Chonburi Province. This 566 rai site was donated to the Ministry of Finance for Thammasat University in 1987. Construction began in 1997. The Pattaya Centre houses the College of Innovative Education, which offers advanced degree courses and training in rural development and management.

Lampang Centre (Thai: ศูนย์ลำปาง), Hang Chat District, Lampang Province: the Thammasat University Council approved the establishment of Lampang Centre in 1996. The university initially held classes in the old city hall. In 2003, the Lampang Centre moved to its current location 15 km from the city. Thammasat Lampang offers opportunities to a small student population of fewer than 1,000 students to study specialized courses on local development and industry. Courses offered at Thammasat Lampang Center include social development, interdisciplinary sociology, law, and handcraft design.

== Faculties, Colleges, and Institutes ==
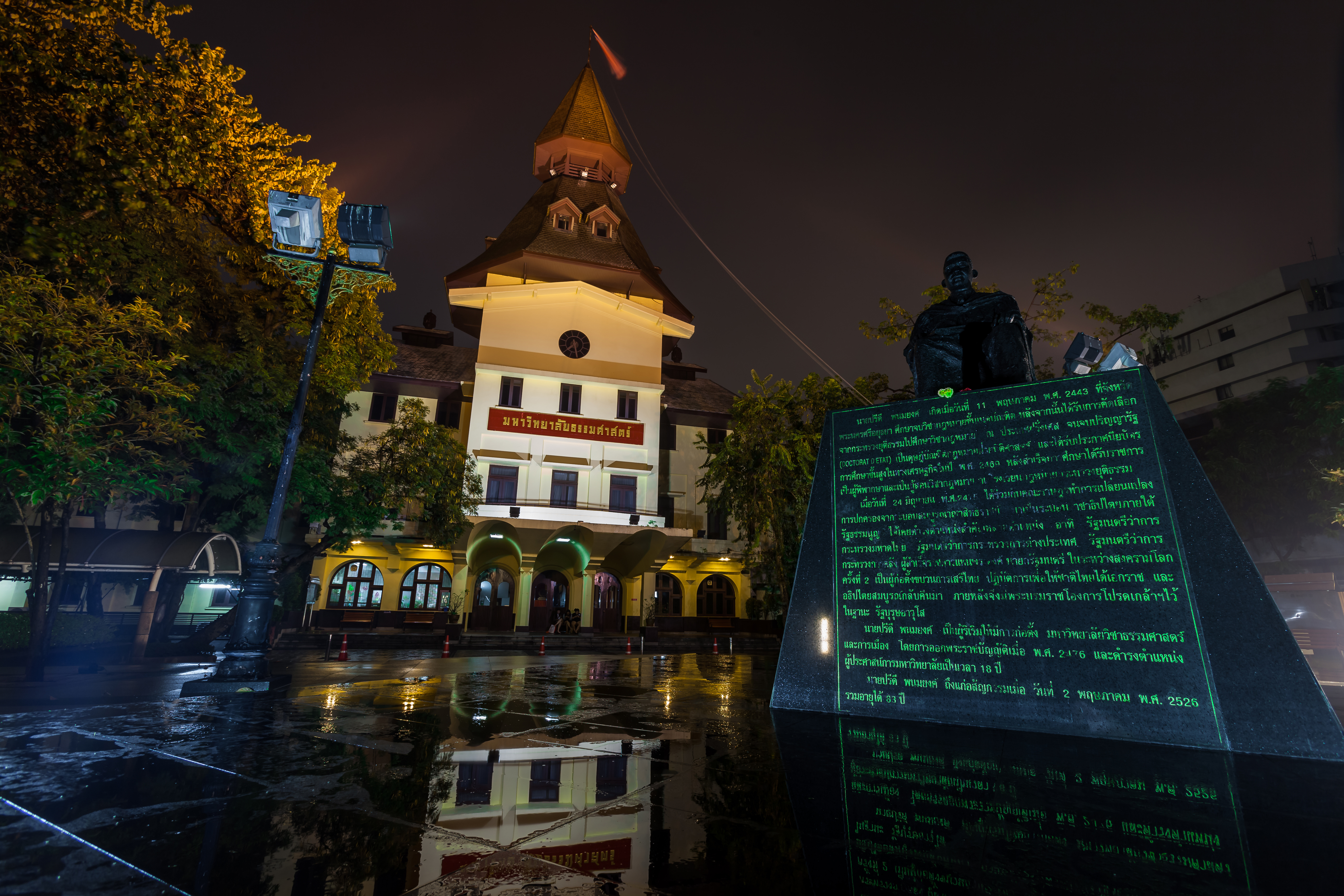
Dome Building, university headquarters

Thammasat University has 19 faculties, 7 colleges, and 7 institutes.

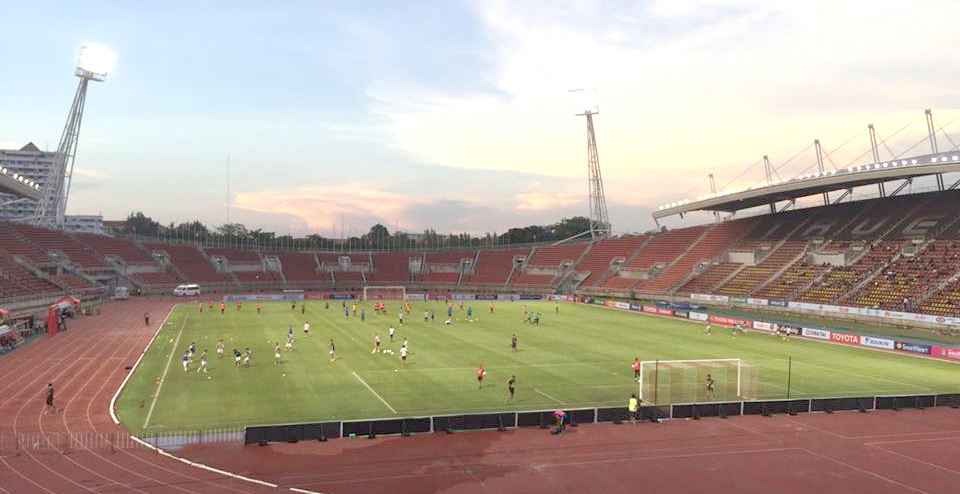
Thammasat University Stadium, Rangsit Centre

The list of faculties, colleges and institutes of Thammasat University, according to the faculty number in the student ID.
No.	Faculty/College/Institute
1	Faculty of Law
2	Faculty of Commerce and Accountancy
3	Faculty of Political Science
4	Faculty of Economics
5	Faculty of Social Administration
6	Faculty of Liberal Arts
7	Faculty of Journalism and Mass Communication
8	Faculty of Sociology and Anthropology
9	Faculty of Science and Technology
10	Faculty of Engineering
11	Faculty of Medicine
12	Faculty of Allied Health Sciences
13	Faculty of Dentistry
14	Faculty of Nursing
15	Faculty of Fine and Applied Arts
16	Faculty of Architecture and Planning
17	Faculty of Public Health
18	Faculty of Pharmacy
19	Faculty of Learning Sciences and Education
21	Language Institute
22	Sirindhorn International Institute of Technology
23	College of Innovation
24	College of Interdisciplinary Studies
27	Pridi Banomyong International College
28	School of Global Studies
29	Chulabhorn International College of Medicine
30	Puey Ungphakorn School of Development Studies

=== Faculty of Law ===
The Faculty of Law was one of the founding faculties of the university. It has its roots in the law school of the Ministry of Justice, instituted under the reign of King Chulalongkorn by Gustave Rolin-Jaequemyns. Former deans of the faculty have included Phraya Nitisat Phaisan, Sanya Dharmasakti, and Preedee Kasemsup. The faculty has programmes up to the doctorate level, as well as several certificate programmes in business law and public law.

=== Faculty of Commerce and Accountancy ===
The Faculty of Commerce and Accountancy was established on 23 November 1938. It was the second oldest business school in Thailand after the Faculty of Commerce and Accountancy, Chulalongkorn University, which was established earlier on the same year. It offers a broad range of programs, including business administration, logistics, international business, human resource management, accounting, finance, marketing, real estate management, and management information system, from diploma to doctoral degree. In addition to its traditional 4-year bachelor's degree, the faculty offers the first innovative integrated bachelor's and master's degree program in business and accounting (IBMP), which requires five years of study to complete both degrees. The faculty also offers Thailand's first international programme in business in which English is the language of instruction (BBA Program). The faculty also offers Thailand's first Global Executive MBA program in which English is the language of instruction (GEMBA program).

The faculty is recognised internationally. In 2005, a team of students from the Master's of Sciences Degree Programme in Marketing (MIM) of Thammasat Business School won, for the second time, the Global Moot Corp, a venue for business plan competition, held at the McCombs School of Business, University of Texas at Austin.

The faculty is the second accounting and business education institution in South East Asia to Singapore which has received the Triple-Crown certification from three world-accredited institutions (EQUIS, AACSB, and AMBA). With less than 1% of commercial and business administration accounting institutions from educational institutions around the world having been certified for all 3 accredited institutions.

The faculty is also known as Thammasat Business School (TBS).

=== Faculty of Political Science ===
The Faculty of Political Science at Thammasat University was established in 1949. Former deans include Direk Chaiyanam a member of the Khana Ratsadon (People's Party) and a former foreign minister. It offers undergraduate and graduate studies in three majors, politics and government, public administration, and international affairs. Most Thai governors, mayors, leaders, and activists graduated from this faculty.

Graduate programmes are offered to regular students, and special programmes are open to executives. A doctoral programme was established in 2001. There are two versions of the masters and bachelors programmes in international relations. The first versions are taught in Thai. The second versions are taught in English and are called the "International Programme". The masters for the International Programme was established in 1998; the bachelors was established in 2009. The military correspondent for the Bangkok Post, Wassana Nanuam, is a prominent graduate of the masters programme, having written her thesis on the Thai military.

This faculty is also known as Singha Daeng ('red lion') along with Chulalongkorn University which is called Singha Dam ('black lion').

=== Faculty of Economics ===
The Faculty of Economics at Thammasat University was established in 1949 and the oldest Faculty of Economics in Thailand. The faculty offers a broad range of academic programmes and other training opportunities. Under the leadership of Dr. Puey Ungpakorn, a former Bank of Thailand governor who took charge concurrently as the dean of the faculty, there were many significant developments within the economics faculty. Dr. Puey secured funding from Rockefeller Foundation and brought faculty members from a number of US universities.

The first big step toward internationalization was the introduction, in 1969, a Master of Economics programme degree taught in English. Since then, a bachelor's programme and a PhD programme taught in English have been added to the curriculum.

The faculty boasts a teaching staff which totals 82, including 44 faculty members with doctoral degree and seven on leave to pursue doctoral degrees. It is considered one of the strongest programmes in Thailand. Its graduates are regularly accepted to the prestigious departments of economics such as Chicago, UC Berkeley, Cornell, Oxford, Cambridge, LSE, Harvard, MIT, Yale, Princeton, PSE.

=== Faculty of Social Administration ===
The Faculty of Social Administration Thammasat University was established to serve state policies, welfare and social security. This faculty has main duty to encourage teaching in Social Welfare, Justice Administration, and Social Development. This Faculty has a long reputation, this is the first school that initiated education in social science of welfare studies.

=== Faculty of Liberal Arts ===
The Faculty of Liberal Arts was established by the Royal Gazette in 1961 by Professor Adul Vicharncharoen, the founder and first dean of the Faculty of Liberal Arts. The purpose of the establishment of the Faculty of Arts at that time was to teach general subjects to all students of the university before they chose to study their majors. At present, the Faculty of Arts offers 19 undergraduate degree courses, 12 master's degree courses, and 3 doctoral degree courses.

The faculty offers the following undergraduate majors: Psychology, Library and Information Science, Literature and Communication, History, Linguistics, English Language, English Language and Literature, French Language, Thai Language, Philosophy, Geography, Japanese Language, Chinese Language, German Language, Russian Language, British and American Studies, Southeast Asian Studies, Russian Studies, International Studies (ASEAN-China), and Business English Communication. The last major opened by the Faculty of Liberal Arts was the degree in Hispanic and Latin American Studies, the first of its kind in Southeast Asia. The graduate school offers master's degrees in 10 disciplines: Linguistics for Communication, History, Library and Information Science, Industrial and Organizational Psychology, French-Thai Translation, Counseling Psychology, Buddhist Studies, Japanese Studies, Thai, English Language and Literature, English Language Studies, Chinese Culture Studies, and English-Thai Translation Studies. The graduate level also offers a Ph.D. in linguistics, history, and English Language Studies, which is a combined master's and doctoral degree.

- English Department

Widely known as one of the leading departments in Thailand with a wide range of prestigious academic programs, the English Department at TU was founded in 1970 and has since developed in teaching and learning as well as research. Today, the English Department offers an undergraduate program (Rangsit Centre) in translation, linguistics, intercultural communication, and literature. Students in the undergraduate program have the opportunity to engage in some extracurricular activities, internship programs, and academic events, including special lectures and exchange programs.

In addition to the BA curriculum, the English Department supports higher interdisciplinary programs (Tha Prachan Centre) offering the MA-PhD programs in English Language Studies, the MA program in English-Thai Translation, and the Graduate Diploma program in English for Business and Management.

- International Programs

The Faculty of Liberal Arts also offers a four-year international program taught in English in specialist disciplines.

The British and American Studies (BAS) International Program at Thammasat University is the only program of its type available in Thailand. The four-year degree offers students an opportunity to explore the culture, the literature, the history, and the political dynamics of the United States and the United Kingdom through a broad and varied curriculum taught by native English speakers from both the US and the UK.

The Business Communication (BC) International Program at Thammasat University provides specialized training in Business English, Chinese, Korean, and Japanese, equipping graduates with the communication and cross-cultural skills needed for careers in corporate communications, marketing, public relations, international business, and customer relations.

=== Faculty of Journalism and Mass Communication ===
The Department of Journalism was established in 1954 and is Thailand's first institute of higher education in journalism. It was granted faculty status in 1979 and has been known since as the Faculty of Journalism and Mass Communication. Today, the faculty offers undergraduate programs in newspaper and print media, radio and television broadcasting, cinematography, advertising, public relations, and communications management. It also offers several programs at the master's level as well as a doctoral degree in mass communication.

There is also an International Program for the Bachelor of Arts Program in Journalism (Media Studies) (BJM), established in 2006. The program offers advanced knowledge and training in journalism and media studies.

The faculty also provides various materials, tools, and studios for all students to practice their skills, such as the Thammasat University Radio Station, editing room, and broadcasting room. Moreover, there are YoungThong Magazine and "Mahavittayalai Newspaper," which present the students' abilities.

=== Faculty of Sociology and Anthropology ===
The Faculty of Sociology and Anthropology was formed as one of the departments of the Faculty of Social Administration at the initiative of the dean, Professor Major General Buncha Mintarakhin (1961–1965). His view was that Thailand should have sociologists and anthropologists who contribute to the society by undertaking research which would strengthen the disciplines. At the time of the department foundation Thai scholars in sociology and anthropology were sparse. It took several years to recruit qualified members in the academic team. Subsequently, the expanding Department of Sociology and Anthropology became a separate division from Social Administration Faculty in 1976.

=== Faculty of Science and Technology ===
The Faculty of Science and Technology was founded in 1986 as the ninth faculty of the university and become the first full-stream faculty that held on Rangsit Campus Began teaching in the five disciplines of mathematics, statistics, computer science, environmental science, and health science. Later, the delegation extended teaching in the field of increasing order. Coupled with the new university founded the Faculty of Engineering, Health and Science. The faculty is now responsible for teaching basic science through to all faculties at Rangsit. The Faculty of Science and Technology offers many science disciplines which focus on both pure sciences and sustainable technologies such as Mathematics, Statistics, Computer Sciences, Environmental Science, Technologies for Sustainable Development, Agricultural Technology, Chemistry, Biotechnology, Physics, Material Science, Food Technology, and Textile Technology, this Faculty also has international programmes offers B.Sc. to PhD. such as Industrial Science Management, Creative Digital Technology (Digital Interactive Simulation/Game Engineering & Design), Innovative Digital Design (Animation & Visual Effect/Game Art & Design), and Organic Farming Management.

=== Faculty of Engineering ===
The Faculty of Engineering was founded on 19 August 1989, as the 10th faculty of the university. Originally formed as a response to governmental initiative to promote the study of science and its related field. It originally started teaching electrical and industrial engineering in 1990, then expanded its offerings to civil engineering (1992), chemical engineering (1994), and mechanical engineering (1996).

The faculty also has an international department which taught in English and very often mistaken as SIIT (see below) by outsiders. This special programme is divided into two distinct parts, the Twinning Engineering Programme (TEP), established in 1997, and the Thammasat English Engineering Programme (TEPE), established in 2000. The TEP programme is a sandwich programme, two years in Thammasat and two years in a foreign university (currently either the University of Nottingham or University of New South Wales). Many of the graduates continue their master's or PhD in prestigious UK universities, such as Imperial, LSE, UCL, and Warwick.

The faculty has strong ties with both NECTEC and MTEC in Thailand Science Park. The faculty also has strong research ties with Japan, particularly and more recently with the University of Karlsruhe in Germany. Its current dean is Associate Professor Dr. Uruya Weesakul.

=== Faculty of Medicine ===
The Faculty of Medicine, Thammasat University was established in March 1990 as the eleventh faculty of the university and the ninth public medical school in Thailand. The faculty offers undergraduate and post-graduate courses in medicine. It also runs master's and doctoral programmes in various disciplines of medicine. Applied Thai traditional medicine can also be studied at the university.

Faculty of Medicine of Thammasat University is the first and only medical school that teaches with Hybrid Problem-based learning (PBL) and Community Based Learning (CBL), which emphasises case study and community problem rather than lecturing.

=== Faculty of Allied Health Sciences ===
After establishing the Faculty of Medicine in 1990, the university announced the Higher Education Development Plan No. 7, approving the establishment of 3 faculties — the Faculty of Dentistry, the Faculty of Nursing, and the Faculty of Medical Technology.

In 1994, the faculty was changed to the Faculty of Allied Health Sciences for further study fields. At present, the faculty offers various undergraduate and postgraduate courses. The undergraduate study has 6 branches: Medical Technology, Physical Therapy, Radiological Technology, Sports and Exercise Science, Sports Coaching, and Sport Management. All programs and courses are based in Rangsit Campus.

=== Faculty of Architecture and Planning ===
The university proposed the establishment of a Faculty of Architecture under the Eighth National Higher Education Plan (1997–2001) of the Ministry of University Affairs (now Office of the Commission on Higher Education under the Ministry of Education). However, a cabinet meeting on 3 February 1998, decided to restrict the establishment of all new departments. The university then created an Architecture Programme to be autonomous under the Thammasat University Council by its resolution of 6 May 1999.

The programme was approved and became the Faculty of Architecture by a resolution of the Thammasat University Council on 29 October 2001. Professor Dr. Vimolsiddhi Horayangkura, who had been the programme's director since 1999, was appointed to be the first dean of the Faculty of Architecture. The faculty offered two more new undergraduate programmes, Interior Architecture and Urban Environmental Planning and Management Programme, in the 2002 academic year.

In 2007, the undergraduate programme in Landscape Architecture and the graduate programme in Interior Architecture were started in response to high market demand for landscape architects and research-oriented designers. In the following year, the school launched the graduate programme in Innovative Real Estate Development.

=== Faculty of Pharmaceutical Sciences ===
The faculty is an institution of higher education in the country for Research Pharmaceutical Sciences to improve health in the community.

There are two majors for students; the undergraduate level offers Pharmaceutical Sciences and Pharmaceutical Care, and the graduate level offers Pharmaceutical Science.

=== Faculty of Learning Sciences and Education ===
The Faculty of Learning Sciences and Education was founded on 29 September 2014. It is based at Rangsit Campus, in Pathum Thani. The Faculty takes an interdisciplinary approach to the research and teaching of education and learning. The Faculty currently offers a Masters in Learning Sciences and Educational Innovation, and a Bachelor of Arts in Learning Sciences. The Faculty of Learning Science established Thammasat Secondary School in 2015. The faculty also has its own laboratory school, Thammasat Secondary School, established in 2017 as the first school in Thailand that runs and promotes active learning, sustainability thoughts, and creative and problem-based learning.

=== Language Institute ===
The Language Institute of Thammasat University (LITU) was officially established as a university faculty in 1985 to serve the ever-growing need for English language training for students in all faculties at Thammasat University. LITU conducts courses at all three of Thammasat University's academic campuses (Tha Prachan, Rangsit and Lampang in northern Thailand), as well as providing diverse language services to the general public and private, academic and governmental organizations in Bangkok and throughout the nation.

LITU is responsible for English-language instruction for students first entering the university (Foundation courses), throughout their four years of academic studies (ESP-English for Specific Purposes), and for graduate students who must achieve minimum standards of English language proficiency. In addition, the Language Institute offers international graduate degree programmes in English Language Teaching (MA-ELT, previously known as MA Teaching English as a Foreign Language) and Career English for International Communication (MA-CEIC, previously known as MA English for Careers), and a graduate diploma programme in English for Careers. Also, to serve the needs of English teachers in the ASEAN community and international settings, LITU offers an international Ph.D. programme in English Language Teaching (PhD-ELT).

=== Sirindhorn International Institute of Technology ===
The Sirindhorn International Institute of Technology, at the university's Rangsit Centre, Pathum Thani Province, is a semi-autonomous institute of technology established in 1992. It offers a range of science, technology and engineering education, as well as related management programmes. All are international programmes, with English language instruction. Although it is an academic unit of the university, and graduates of the institute receive Thammasat University degrees, the institute is self-administered and financed. The institute enjoys strong links with Thailand National Science and Technology Development Agency, Thailand Science Park, national graduate schools (such as JGSEE, TGIST, and TAIST) and many international universities, notably its neighbour Asian Institute of Technology, and a group of Japanese and European universities.

Being a research-led academic institution in nature, from the most recent performance evaluation (academic year 2003) by the university, the institute has the highest number of research publications (both in raw quantity and per graduate student heads), compared to other academic units in the university, and when compared to other universities, each SIIT faculty member produces twice the highest value of national range for international journal publications (0.74 vs 0-0.41, academic year 2004). In 2007, the Thailand Research Fund assessed research outcomes of universities in Thailand, and SIIT ranked as "very good" on all three indicators. The institute is also one of a very small number of universities which can secure numbers of Thailand Research Fund's Royal Golden Jubilee grants, considered to be the country's most prestigious research grants for PhD students, for every single year since the programme began in 1998 — one of the only three which can secure Engineering discipline grants for every single year.

Anyway, it's still considered one of the easiest engineering schools to get accepted due to very low entry score and many rounds of admission. Due to admission score, SIIT has a high rate of variant admission scores, students with high admission score and lowest admission score can be entered but most of the low-performance students will be disqualified. The unqualified or unsatisfied academic competency students will be expelled within a first or second year which occurred about 50% of entry students.

=== College of Innovation ===
The College of Innovation (CITU) was established in 1995 by the Thammasat University Council as the College of Innovation in Higher Education. The college was designed with a focus on "being a college", instead of having the more traditional faculty and departmental structure. The name was changed to College of Innovation in 2007.

The College of Innovation offers bachelor's and master’s degrees in service innovation, creative industry, digital transformation, cultural and technology management, as well as data science.

The College offers the following degree programs:

At the Bachelor’s level, there are four programs available: Bachelor of Arts Program in Management of Cultural Heritage and Creative Industries (BMCI), Bachelor of Arts Program in Service Innovation (International Program) (BSI), Bachelor of Science Program in Digital Transformation and Innovation (DX), and Bachelor of Science Program in Digital Transformation and Innovation (International Program) (DXi).

At the Master’s level, there are four programs available: Master of Science Program in Innovation and Technology Management (MTT), Master of Arts Program in Management of Cultural Heritage and Creative Industries (MCI), Master of Science Program in Digital Strategy (DS), and Master of Science Program in Applied Data Science (Online Program) (TUXSA).

=== School of Global Studies ===
The School of Global Studies (SGS) is an academic initiative within Thammasat University. Degrees offered are Bachelor of Arts Program in Global Studies and Social Entrepreneurship (International Program) (GSSE) and Master of Arts Program in Social Innovation and Sustainability (International Program) (SIS).

=== Chulabhorn International College of Medicine ===
Chulabhron International College of Medicine is the twenty-first medical school set up in Thailand located in Khlong Luang District, Pathum Thani Province and is the first institution in Thailand to provide an international course in medicine. The first year course consists of general sciences, followed by pre-clinical years 2 and 3, and then the clinical years 4–6. During the clinical years, Thammasat University Hospital is used as the main training site and students may undertake electives in foreign countries.

CICM was opened on 28 August 2012 to provide medical education in English as an international course. The setup of the university involved a cooperation between Thammasat University and Bumrungrad International Hospital.

== Thai and International Programs ==
Thammasat University offers Thai and international programs for undergraduate, master's, and doctoral degrees in the fields of social sciences, arts and humanities, science, and technology.

== Rankings ==
University Ranking
Domestic Rankings (International Rankings)
Assessment by	Rank
QS (Asia) (2026)	4th (126)
QS (World) (2027)	3rd (555)
QS (Graduate Employment Outcomes Ranking and Score) (2027)	2nd (85.4)

- Thammasat University was awarded four QS Stars, meaning Thammasat University is highly international, demonstrating excellence in both research and teaching. The institution provides an excellent environment for students and faculty.
- Thammasat University is indeed one of the top universities in Thailand in the TCAS (Thai University Central Admission System), and it is consistently grouped among the most competitive universities along with Chulalongkorn University and Mahidol University.
- QS World University Rankings (2027): Thammasat University is ranked 555th in the latest QS World University Rankings, which assessed over 1,500 universities from a global pool of more than 8,000 institutions, placing it as the 3rd highest-ranked university in Thailand.
- QS Asia University Rankings (2026): Thammasat University was ranked 126th in the Asia region, placing it as the 4th highest-ranked university in Thailand.
- QS Graduate Employability Rankings (2027): Thammasat University—Thailand’s second oldest university—was recognized for its strong graduate outcomes, ranking 2nd nationally in Employment Outcomes with a score of 85.4.

QS World University Ranking by Subject 2026

Global rank	Domestic rank	Main subject
101-150	2	Hospitality and Leisure Management
151-200	2	Politics / English Language and Literature
201-250	2	Law and Legal Studies
251-300	2	Modern Languages
274	2	Arts and Humanities
299	2	Social Science and Management
301-350	2	Business and Management Studies / Linguistics
301-375	2	Accounting and Finance / Sociology
351-400	2	Economics and Econometrics
401-475	7	Agriculture and Foresty
451-500	4	Medicine
751-850	5	Computer Science and Information Systems

== Notable people ==
Founder Pridi Banomyong was a senior statesman, former regent, and former prime minister. Sanya Dharmasakti, former prime minister and Privy Council member, was a rector of Thammasat. Galyani Vadhana, Princess of Thailand and the elder sister of Ananda Mahidol and Bhumibol Adulyadej, was the former head of the foreign language department at the Faculty of Liberal Arts. Puey Ungphakorn, former governor of the Bank of Thailand, was the dean of the Faculty of Economics, and rector of Thammasat University. Abhisit Vejjajiva, the former prime minister and leader of the Democrat Party. Ammar Siamwalla, former president of the Thailand Development Research Institute, and Jermsak Pinthong, former senator, are former lecturers at the Faculty of Economics.

Several Prime Ministers of Thailand attended Thammasat University, including Tanin Kraivixien, Chuan Leekpai, Samak Sundaravej, and Somchai Wongsawat, as well as many other ministers and Bank of Thailand governors.

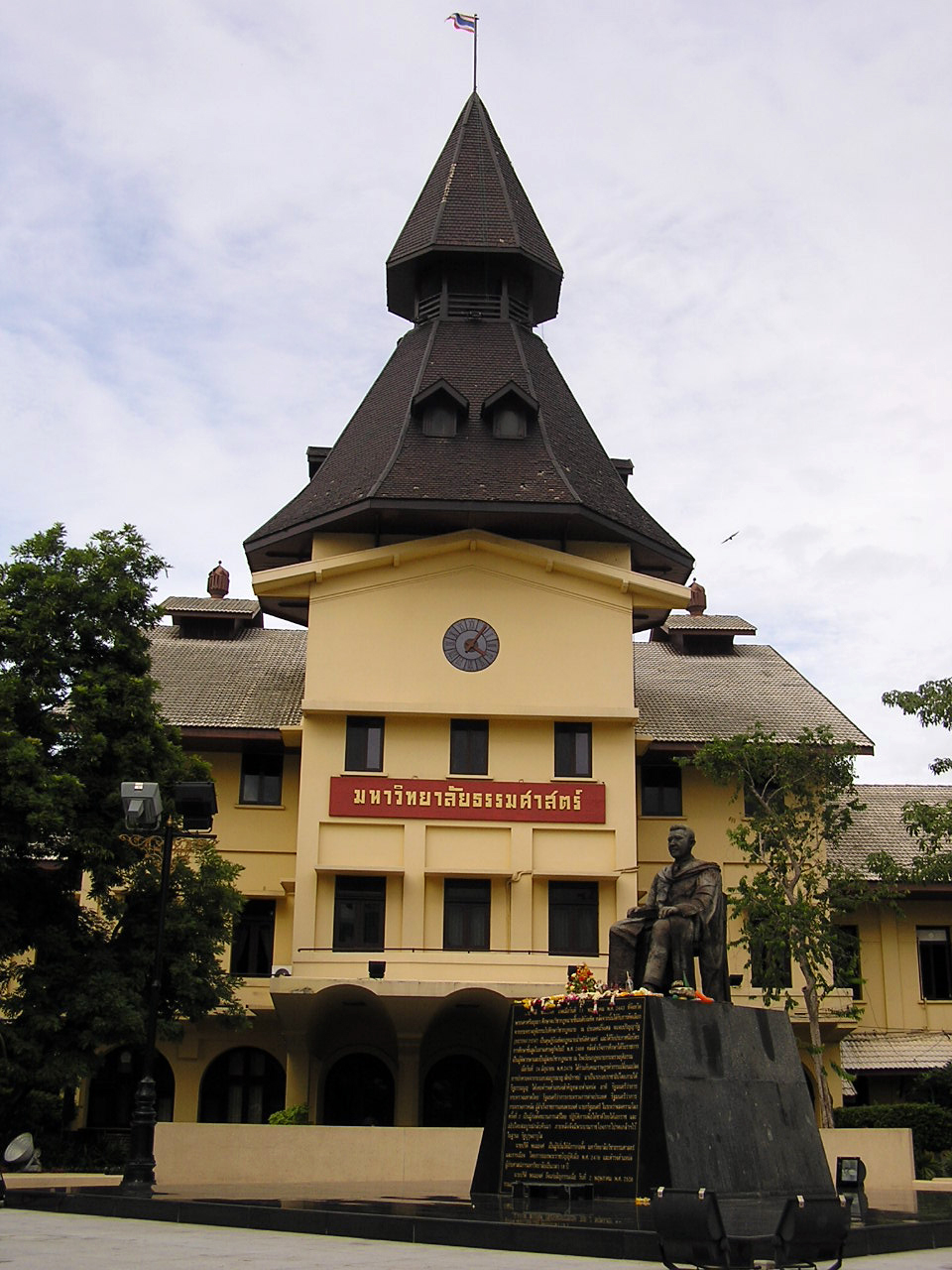
Pridi Phanomyong's statue. He was the first chancellor and founder of the university. Dome Building, Tha Prachan Campus.

=== Prominent faculty members ===
Former and current prominent faculty members include:

- Princess Galyani Vadhana, a princess of Thailand and the elder sister of King Ananda Mahidol (Rama VIII) and King Bhumibol Adulyadej (Rama IX), was head of the foreign language department at the Faculty of Liberal Arts
- Pridi Phanomyong, senior statesman, former regent and prime minister, leader of the Free Thai underground movement, and founder of the university
- Puey Ungpakorn, former governor of the Bank of Thailand, former rector, and former dean of the Faculty of Economics
- Sanya Dharmasakti, chief statesman, former prime minister, and former rector
- Abhisit Vejjajiva, former prime minister, leader of the Democrat Party and former lecturer at the Faculty of Economics
- Theerayut Boonmee, former student activist, social critic and lecturer at the Faculty of Sociology and Anthropology
- Ammar Siamwalla, current member of the National Legislative Assembly, former president of the Thailand Development Research Institute, and former professor at the Faculty of Economics

=== Notable alumni ===
- Putthipong Assaratanakul, Thai actor, best known for his role as Teh in I Told Sunset About You
- Banyat Bantadtan, former deputy prime minister and former leader of the Democrat Party
- Rewat Buddhinan, pioneer in the Thai pop music industry and founder of the GMM Grammy
- Ranee Campen, actress; notable roles include Phorn Prom Onlaweng, Khun Chai Puttipat, Plerng Chimplee and Bubphe Sanniwat, Love Destiny TV series
- Aniporn Chalermburanawong, actress, singer, model, Miss Universe Thailand 2015 and top 10 at Miss Universe, 2015
- Chaovarat Chanweerakul, deputy minister of finance, minister of public health, and later deputy prime minister
- Sirikan Charoensiri, human rights lawyer
- Nuon Chea, or "Long Boonrod", member of the Khmer Rouge
- Thommayanti, also known as Wimon Chiamcharoen, novelist
- Vachirawit Chivaaree, Thai artist, actor, singer, model, host and entrepreneur, best known for his role as Sarawat in 2gether and Still 2gether, Thyme in F4 Thailand and Kimhan in Astrophile
- Thawatchai Damrong-Ongtrakul, former Thai national football player
- Mom Rajawongse Pridiyathorn Devakula, former governor of the Bank of Thailand
- Predee Daochai, former minister of finance
- Jaran Ditapichai, former member of the National Human Rights Commission
- Somkid Jatusripitak, former minister of commerce and deputy prime minister, 2015
- Direk Jayanama, Thai diplomat and politician who served as Thailand's justice, finance and foreign affairs minister and as deputy prime minister
- Thanathorn Juangroongruangkit, Thai politician, leader of the Future Forward Party
- Charnvit Kasetsiri, Thai historian, author and former rector of Thammasat University; Fukuoka Academic Prize awardee.
- Tanin Kraivixien, former prime minister
- Wissanu Krea-ngam, deputy prime minister
- Chuan Leekpai, former prime minister and former leader of the Democrat Party
- Princess Bajrakitiyabha
- Princess Galyani Vadhana
- Nitipoom Navaratna, politician and columnist
- Metawin Opas-iamkajorn, Thai actor, best known for his role as Tine in 2gether and Kavin in F4 Thailand
- Vachiravit Paisarnkulwong, Thai actor, best known for his role as Pete in Love Sick
- Pathit Pisitkul, actor and singer
- Surin Pitsuwan, politician and ASEAN Secretary-General
- Nongchanai Prinyathawat, novelist
- Maj. Gen. Mom Rajawongse Kukrit Pramoj, former prime minister and former Speaker of the House of Representatives of Thailand
- Sophon Ratanakorn, president of the Supreme Court of Thailand
- Thikamporn Ritta-apinan, actress and Miss Teen Thailand 2002
- Boonchu Rojanastien, former deputy prime minister and finance minister of Thailand and former president of Bangkok Bank, Thailand's first "economic tsar"
- Veerathai Santiprabhob, governor of the Bank of Thailand
- Samak Sundaravej, former prime minister of Thailand and former governor of Bangkok
- Suchart Thada-Thamrongvech, politician, former minister of finance and minister of education
- Anne Thongprasom, film and television actress, host and producer
- Pimpaka Towira, independent film director, screenwriter and producer
- Thongchai Winichakul, professor in the history department, University of Wisconsin–Madison, and a specialist in the intellectual and cultural history of Thailand
- Somchai Wongsawat, former prime minister, 2009
- Suwat Woradilok, writer and Thailand National Artist for Literature awardee in 1991
- Puey Ungphakorn, economist, former governor of the Bank of Thailand and Ramon Magsaysay Award for Government Service awardee
- Ophat Phonsin, politician

=== International alumni ===
With the introduction of the Global Executive MBA programme at the Thammasat Business School in 2018, international alumni helped Thammasat University achieve a higher global ranking.

== See also ==
- Education in Thailand
- List of universities in Thailand
- List of colleges and universities
- Pridi Phanomyong
- Puey Ungpakorn

== Notes ==
1. The head of Thammasat University was originally called chancellor (ผู้ประศาสน์การ phu prasat kan). In 1952, the post was renamed rector (อธิการบดี athikanbodi) by then prime minister, Field Marshal Plaek Phibunsongkram, who also became the first rector of the university.
