= Chalongphob Sussangkarn =

Thai economist and politician (1950–2024)

- ฉลองภพ สุสังกร์กาญจน์

Minister of Finance
- In office 8 March 2007 – 6 February 2008
- Prime Minister: Surayud Chulanont
- Preceded by: Pridiyathorn Devakula
- Succeeded by: Surapong Suebwonglee

Personal details
- Born: 10 April 1950 Bangkok, Thailand
- Died: 23 August 2024 (aged 74) Bangkok, Thailand
- Height: 1.67 m (5 ft 6 in)
- Education: University of Cambridge
- Profession: Economist
- Known for: TDRI presidency (1996–2007)

Chalongphob Sussangkarn (Thai: ฉลองภพ สุสังกร์กาญจน์, RTGS: Chalongphop Sutsangkan, 10 April 1950 – 23 August 2024) was a Thai economist. He was the President of the Thailand Development Research Institute and later served as Minister of Finance in Surayud Chulanont's military junta. An ethnic Chinese of Hainanese origin, he replaced Pridiyathorn Devakula after Pridiyathorn abruptly resigned. Chalongphob joined several other TDRI-affiliated individuals who had Cabinet-level seats in the junta, including Deputy Prime Minister and Industry Minister Kosit Panpiemras and Energy Minister Piyasvasti Amranand. Prior to joining the cabinet, Chalongphob had no experience in government and was an economist.

== Biography ==
=== Education and career ===
Sussangkarn received BA and PhD degrees from the University of Cambridge. After graduation, he taught at the Department of Economics at the University of California, Berkeley during 1977–79. He later joined the World Bank in Washington, D.C., where he served from 1979 to 1985. He then returned to Thailand to work as an economist at the Thailand Development Research Institute (TDRI). Sussangkarn served as the President of TDRI from 1996 up until 2007. He resigned from his post in early March 2007 in order to accept appointment as finance minister, replacing Pridiyathorn Devakula, who abruptly resigned. In February 2008, Sussangkarn returned to the TDRI to work as a researcher.

=== Death ===
Sussangkarn died in Bangkok on 23 August 2024, at the age of 74.

== Policies ==
Chalongphob's policy stance was pro-business, and included:

- Being against the Surayud government's capital control policy,
- Support for greater liberalization of foreign investment in Thailand, and
- Being against the Thaksin government's populist economic policies.

== Sources ==
- Online Profile
- TDRI
- "Chalongphob is appointed as new finance minister." The Nation 03-07-2007
- "Test Times." The Nation 03-07-2007

Political offices
Preceded by Pridiyathorn Devakula	Minister of Finance; 2007–2008	Succeeded by Surapong Suebwonglee
