= Sethaput Suthiwartnarueput =

21st Governor of Bank of Thailand

- เศรษฐพุฒิ สุทธิวาทนฤพุฒิ
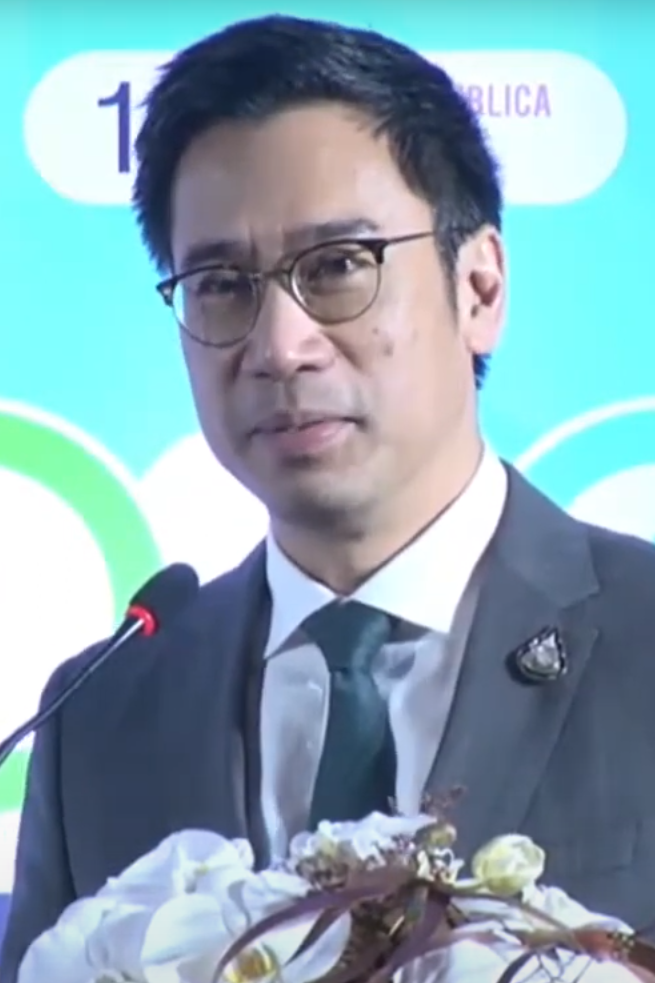
- Sethaput in November 2020

Privy Councillor of Thailand
- Incumbent
- Assumed office 26 March 2026
- Monarch: Vajiralongkorn

Governor of the Bank of Thailand
- In office 1 October 2020 – 30 September 2025
- Preceded by: Veerathai Santiprabhob
- Succeeded by: Vitai Ratanakorn

Personal details
- Born: 1 February 1965 (age 61)
- Education: Swarthmore College; Yale University

Sethaput Suthiwartnarueput (Thai: เศรษฐพุฒิ สุทธิวาทนฤพุฒิ, RTGS: Settaphut Sutthiwatnaruephut; born 1 February 1965) is a Thai economist that has been the Governor of the Bank of Thailand since 1 October 2020. He also served as a board member for the National Economic and Social Development Council, the Securities and Exchange Commission, and the Insurance Commission.

== Career ==
Prior to his appointment as governor of the Bank of Thailand (BOT), Sethaput served as an economic advisor to Prime Minister Prayut Chan-ocha and as a member of the BOT's Monetary Policy Committee since 2014. He was also a former economist at the World Bank Group in Washington DC.

=== Bank of Thailand ===
Sethaput's term is expected to expire on 30 September 2025. Vitai Ratanakorn was named as his successor on 22 July 2025.

== Honors ==
- 2024 - Knight Commander of the Most Noble Order of the Crown of Thailand
- 2003 - Commander of the Most Exalted Order of the White Elephant
