= Wichit Srisa-an =

Thai politician (1934–2023)

- วิจิตร ศรีสอ้าน
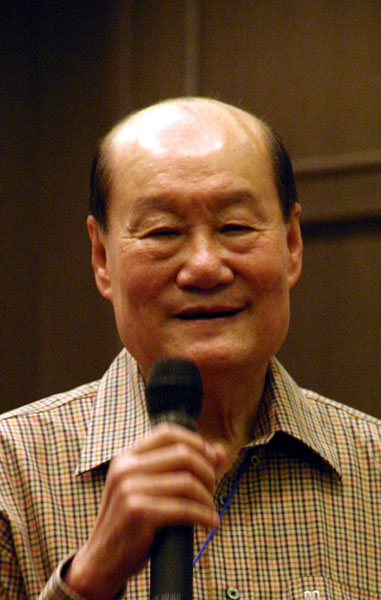
- Wichit Srisa-an in 2007

Minister of Education
- In office 9 October 2006 – 6 February 2008
- Prime Minister: Surayud Chulanont
- Preceded by: Chaturon Chaisang
- Succeeded by: Somchai Wongsawat

Personal details
- Born: 22 December 1934 Chachoengsao, Thailand
- Died: 30 September 2023 (aged 88)
- Party: Democrat Party
- Spouse: Sukon Srisa-arn
- Education: Chulalongkorn University
- Profession: Politician

Wichit Srisa-an (Thai: วิจิตร ศรีสอ้าน, RTGS: Wichit Sisa-an; 22 December 1934 – 30 September 2023) was a Thai academic, education administrator, and politician. He founded three universities (Sukhothai Thammathirat, Suranaree and Walailak), and served as Permanent Secretary of the Ministry of University Affairs from 1987 to 1994 and as Minister of Education from 2006 to 2008.

== Democrat MP ==
Wichit was a Democrat MP following the 2001 general election which the Thai Rak Thai party won in a landslide. He became head of the Democrat Party’s committee on educational issues.

== Minister of Education ==
Srisa-an was appointed Minister of Education in the military-appointed government that followed the 2006 coup. As Education Minister, he cancelled several key Thai Rak Thai-government policies like Thailand's participation in the One Laptop Per Child program and planned to install broadband internet connections in all Thai schools.

Key policies Wichit enacted included:

- The cancellation of Thailand's participation in the One Laptop Per Child (OLPC) program.
- The cancellation of plans to install personal computers and broadband internet connections in every public and secondary school in Thailand.
- Forcing 430 prestigious schools across the country to accept half of their students from the local neighborhood. All other schools would be required to accept all applicants; if applicants exceeded seats, a random draw would choose which applicants would be accepted.

Due to escalating violence in the South, all schools in Yala, Pattani, and Narathiwat provinces were shut down indefinitely from 27 November 2006. Over 1,000 schools were closed.

== Death ==
Wichit Srisa-an died on 30 September 2023, at the age of 88.

== See also ==
- Surayud Chulanont
- Thailand 2006 interim civilian government
- Council for National Security
