= Sirikan Charoensiri =

Thai human rights attorney

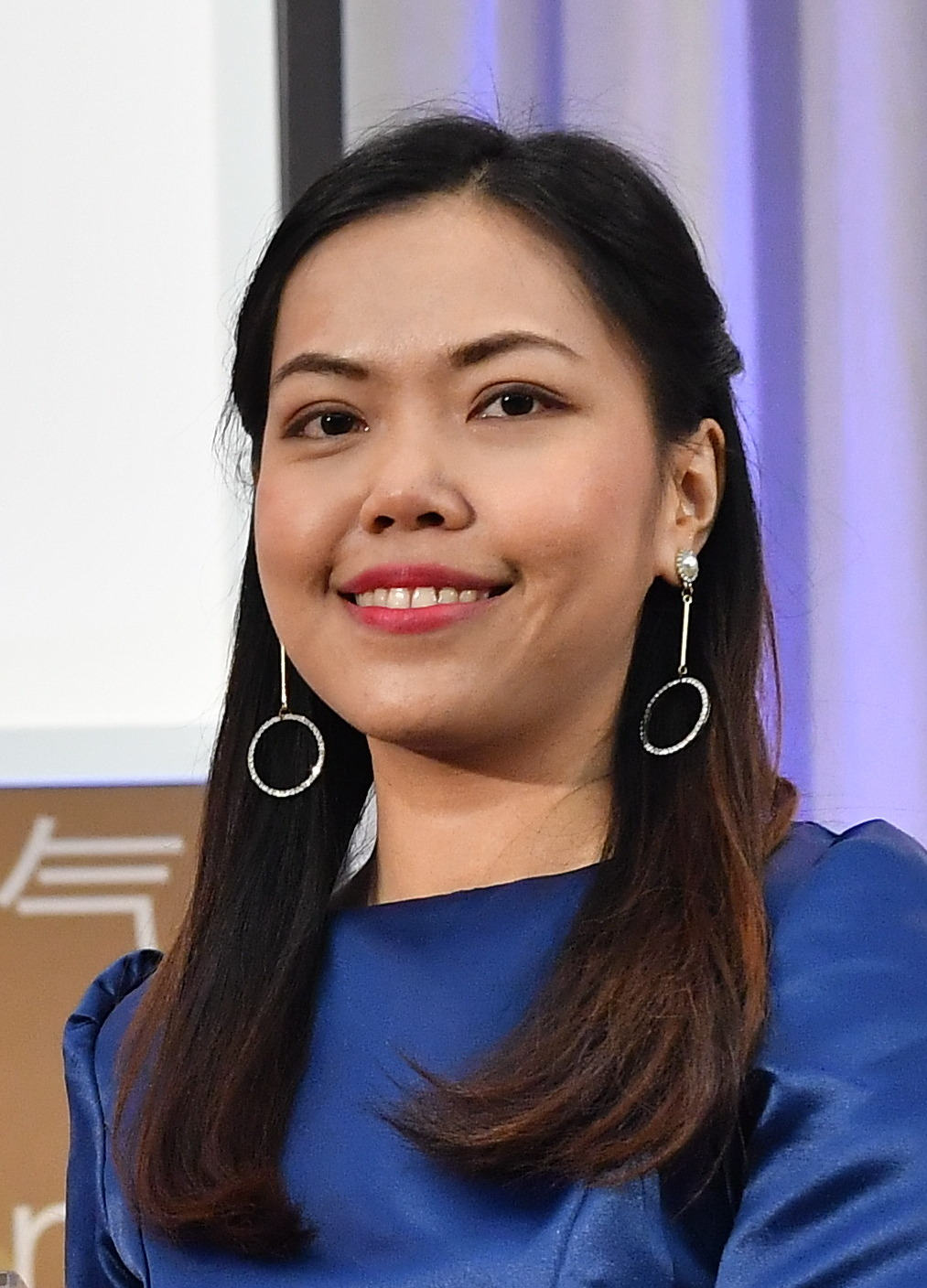
- Born: 1986 (age 39–40); Yasothon, Thailand
- Education: Triam Udom Suksa School; Thammasat University
- Occupation: lawyer

Sirikan Charoensiri (also known as June Charoensiri, Thai: ศิริกาญจน์ เจริญศิริ) (born 1986) is a Thai human rights attorney. She works with Thai Lawyers for Human Rights (TLHR) and is one of the legal representatives of the fourteen student activists from the New Democracy Movement (NDM). She has been the subject of harassment and threats from Thai authorities, as well as criminal charges related to her work as a human rights lawyer. She is the first Thai lawyer to have been charged with sedition by the military junta.

== Education ==
Sirikan Charoensiri was born in Thailand in 1986 and was raised in Yasothon, Yasothon Province. She attended Triam Udom Suksa High School, obtaining a college preparatory education, and then entered law school, graduating from Thammasat University in 2009. After completing her degree, Charonsiri completed an internship with the International Commission of Jurists and then consulted with the Association for the Prevention of Torture and the American Bar Association on the prevention of torture, human rights concerns regarding the South Thailand insurgency and implementation of the Rule of Law Initiative for 2 years. In 2013, she enrolled in a master of laws program at the University of Essex to study international human rights law.

== Career ==
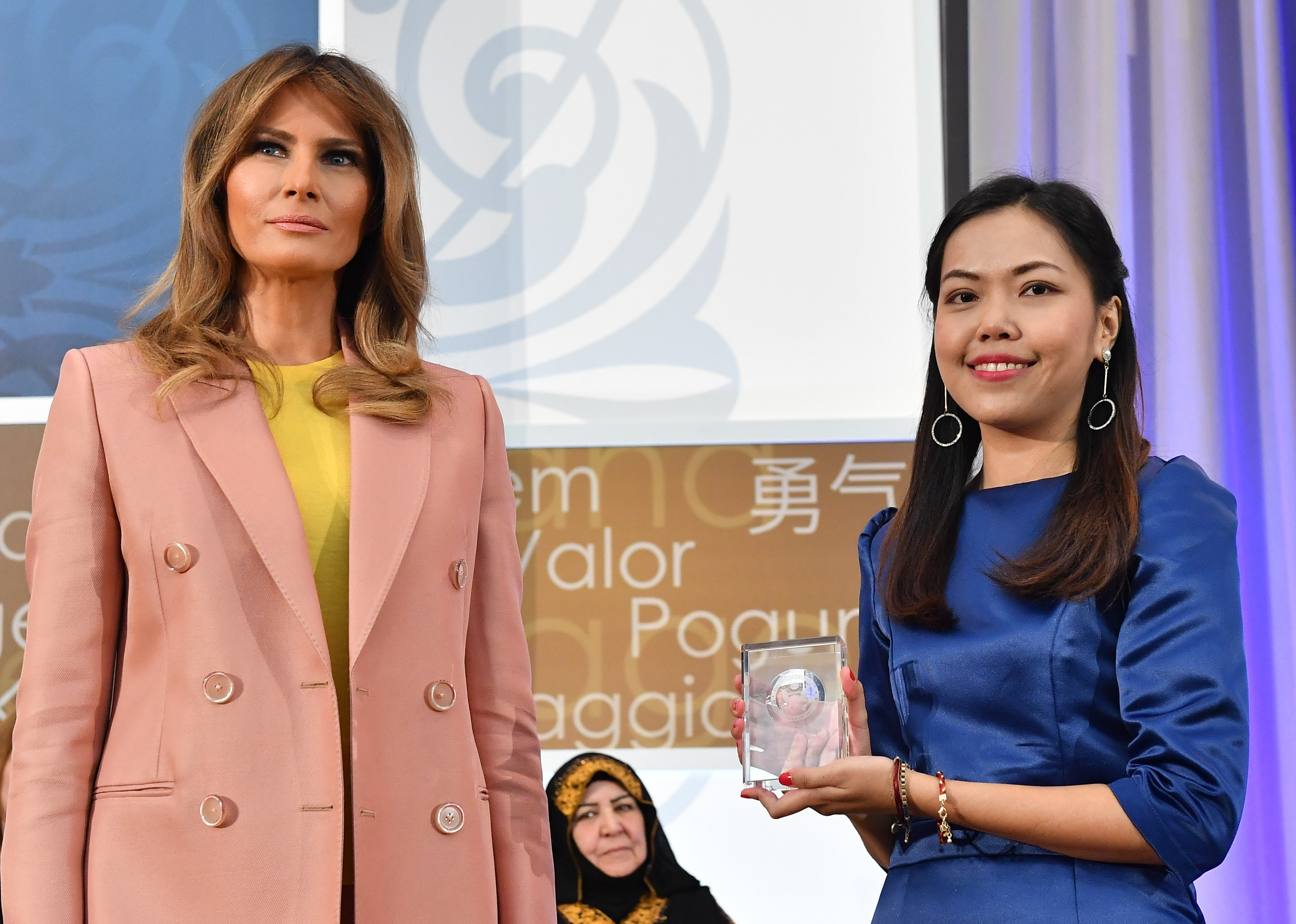
Sirikan Charoensiri of Thailand with Melania Trump at the 2018 International Women of Courage Award

Upon completion of her LL.M, Charonsiri returned to work for the International Commission of Jurists. When the 2014 Thai coup d'état occurred, she recognized the need to set up a separate entity to deal with legal matters, as attorneys were being barred access to their clients and the military was arresting people without a warrants, detaining them without charges, and detaining them in secret camps. When she co-founded Thai Lawyers for Human Rights, it was initially created as a counseling hotline. Soon it expanded to a team of human rights lawyers, funded by international advocacy groups to work on violations of human rights.

In 2015, Charonsiri obtained the release of photojournalist Anthony Kwan Hok-chun, of the Initium Media organization from Hong Kong. Kwan, who had come to Thailand to report on the bombing of the Erawan Shrine, brought protective gear including a flak jacket and helmet, unaware that the items were controlled under Thai weapon's laws. He was arrested in attempting to return to Hong Kong and his passport was seized.

That same year 14 pro-democracy student protesters were arrested in June 2015 and charged with sedition. Charoensiri and other lawyers representing the students, protested that the students were being tried in a military court. Seven months after the student's arrest, Charoensiri charged with refusal to comply with an official order and concealing evidence. The charges stemmed from her receiving her clients' cell phones when they were arrested and securing them in her car. The following day, she filed a complaint against the police for unlawfully confiscating her car to complete their search. The claim resulted in additional charges being filed against Charoensiri for false allegations against the police.

After attending the 33rd general United Nations Human Rights Council meeting in Geneva, Charoensiri was issued a summons for additional charges of co-conspiracy and sedition. It was the first time that a lawyer had been charged with sedition by the junta, sparking outcry from international human rights organizations.

On 19 May 2017 Sirikan Charoensiri achieved the fourth L4L-Award in Amsterdam, the Netherlands. The award was given to her by Jorge Molano the lawyer from Colombia, who won the award in 2015. It was the first time a woman won this award.
