= Prasarn Trairatvorakul =

Thai banker

- ประสาร ไตรรัตน์วรกุล

Governor of the Bank of Thailand
- In office 1 October 2010 – 30 September 2015
- Preceded by: Tarisa Watanagase
- Succeeded by: Veerathai Santiprabhob

Personal details
- Born: 20 August 1952 (age 74) Bangkok, Thailand
- Education: Chulalongkorn University; Harvard University
- Profession: Banker; central banker
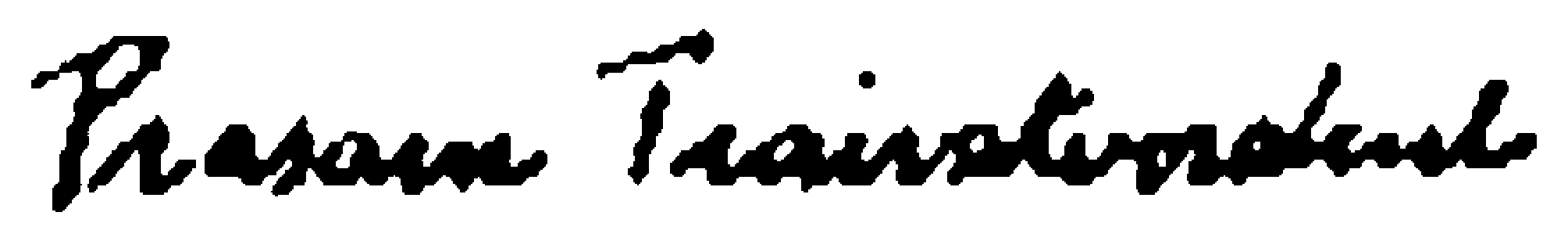
- Signature

Prasarn Trairatvorakul (Thai: ประสาร ไตรรัตน์วรกุล; born 20 August 1952) is a Thai banker. He is former governor of Bank of Thailand.

== Education ==
He graduated with first class honours, gold medal in bachelor's degree of electrical engineering from Chulalongkorn University. He also has a masters of engineering degree in industrial engineering and management from Asian Institute of Technology, Bangkok, Thailand, a master's degree in business administration, Harvard University, Massachusetts, U.S.A., and a doctor of business administration degree from Harvard.

== Careers ==
He started working as an academic economist at Bank of Thailand in 1983 until 1989. He became secretary of The Securities and Exchange Commission, Thailand. He worked as president of Kasikorn Bank from 2004 to 2010. In 2010, he was appointed as governor of Bank of Thailand. On 5 February 2021, he was appointed to be Chairman of the Stock Exchange of Thailand board of Governors.
