= Veerathai Santiprabhob =

Thai central banker

- วิรไท สันติประภพ
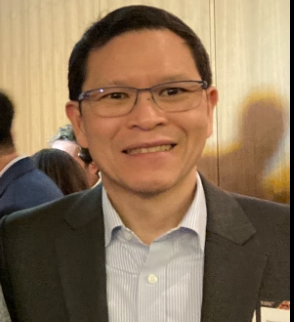

Governor of the Bank of Thailand
- In office 1 October 2015 – 30 September 2020
- Preceded by: Prasarn Trairatvorakul
- Succeeded by: Sethaput Suthiwartnarueput

Personal details
- Born: 25 December 1969 (age 56) Bangkok, Thailand
- Education: Thammasat University; Harvard University
- Profession: Economist

Veerathai Santiprabhob (Thai: วิรไท สันติประภพ) (born 25 December 1969) was the Governor of the Bank of Thailand from 1 October 2015 to 30 September 2020.

== Early life and education ==
Veerathai was born on December 25, 1969, the son of Police General Prathin Santiprapop, former Chief of Police and Kuntala Santipipop. He had three brothers and sisters. He was the grandson on the maternal side of Phraya Bhichai Ronnarongsongkharm (Thongdee Jarutat), former commander of the 1st Division and Bupha Bhichai Ronnarongsongkharm.

He was educated at Thammasat University (BA Economics, 1988) with first class honors and receiving 4 gold medals for academic assistance and another 1 medal was awarded to Bhumibol Scholarship throughout the period of studying at Thammasat University and he graduated with a degree in economics at the age of 18. After that, he was awarded an Anandamahidol scholarship and studied for a master's degree and doctorate degree at Harvard University (MA Economics, 1991; PhD, 1994) he completed a doctorate in economics at the age of 24 by doing the thesis "Financial Liberalization in Southeast Asia" under Dwight H. Perkins.

== Career ==
Veerathai started working at the International Monetary Fund at Washington DC, which advises governments and central banks of member countries. When Thailand had an economic crisis in 1997, he had to leave the International Monetary Fund and became co-director of Economic Policy Research Institute, Fiscal Policy Office, Ministry of Finance. He played a major role in pushing economic stimulus measures and measures to solve important financial institutional problems.

From 2000 to 2008, he worked at the Siam Commercial Bank Public Company Limited, implementing a major organizational reform after the 1997 economic crisis, like liquidity management, asset and liability management, credit policy determination, investment management, management of financial business groups through the Bank's subsidiaries and independent directors and risk management committee of Thanachart Bank.

From 2009 to 2013, he worked at the Stock Exchange of Thailand at a time when the organization was undergoing reforms. As Vice President, his corporate planning strategy developed the country's capital market development plan into in-depth capital market research, causing the Thai Stock Exchange to be recognized on the world capital market stage, and creating a network of cooperation with the stock exchange in the ASEAN region.

Dr. Veerathai was appointed as the 20th Governor of the Bank of Thailand, succeeding Prasarn Trairatvorakul on October 1, 2015, a position he held until his term finished on September 30, 2020.

Veerathai's tenure as governor was notable for the Bank of Thailand missing its inflation target for all 5 years of his governorship.

Government offices
Preceded by Prasarn Trairatvorakul	Governor of the Bank of Thailand; 2015-2020	Succeeded by Sethaput Suthiwartnarueput
