= College of Innovation, Thammasat University =

Graduate school in Thammasat University, Thailand

Coordinates: 13.759285°N 100.490692°E

College of Innovation, Thammasat University (Thai: วิทยาลัยนวัตกรรม) is an undergraduate and graduate school at Thammasat University, Thailand. Established in 1995, College of Innovation, Thammasat University (CITU), is Thailand’s leading institution in innovation with innovative programs in service innovation, cultural heritage & creative industries, digital transformation, technology management, and digital policy. Our programs have been designed to provide graduates with the skills needed for the disruptive and competitive landscape. Moreover, CITU faculty members ranked among the top within Thammasat University in terms of research funding and international publication.
