= Ophat Phonsin =

Thai politician (1921–2024)

Member of the House of Representatives of Thailand for Lopburi province
- In office 22 April 1979 – 24 July 1988

Personal details
- Born: 2 April 1921 Ban Mi district, Lopburi province, Siam
- Died: 6 January 2024 (aged 102) Ban Mi district, Lopburi province, Thailand
- Party: Social Action Party; United Democratic Party
- Education: Thammasat University

Ophat Phonsin (Thai: โอภาส พลศิลป; 2 April 1921 – 6 January 2024) was a Thai politician. A member of the Social Action Party, he served in the House of Representatives from 1979 to 1988.

Ophat died in Ban Mi district on 6 January 2024 at the age of 102.
