= Pridiyathorn Devakula =

Thai politician and economist (born 1947)

Mom Rajawongse Pridiyathorn Devakula
- ปรีดิยาธร เทวกุล
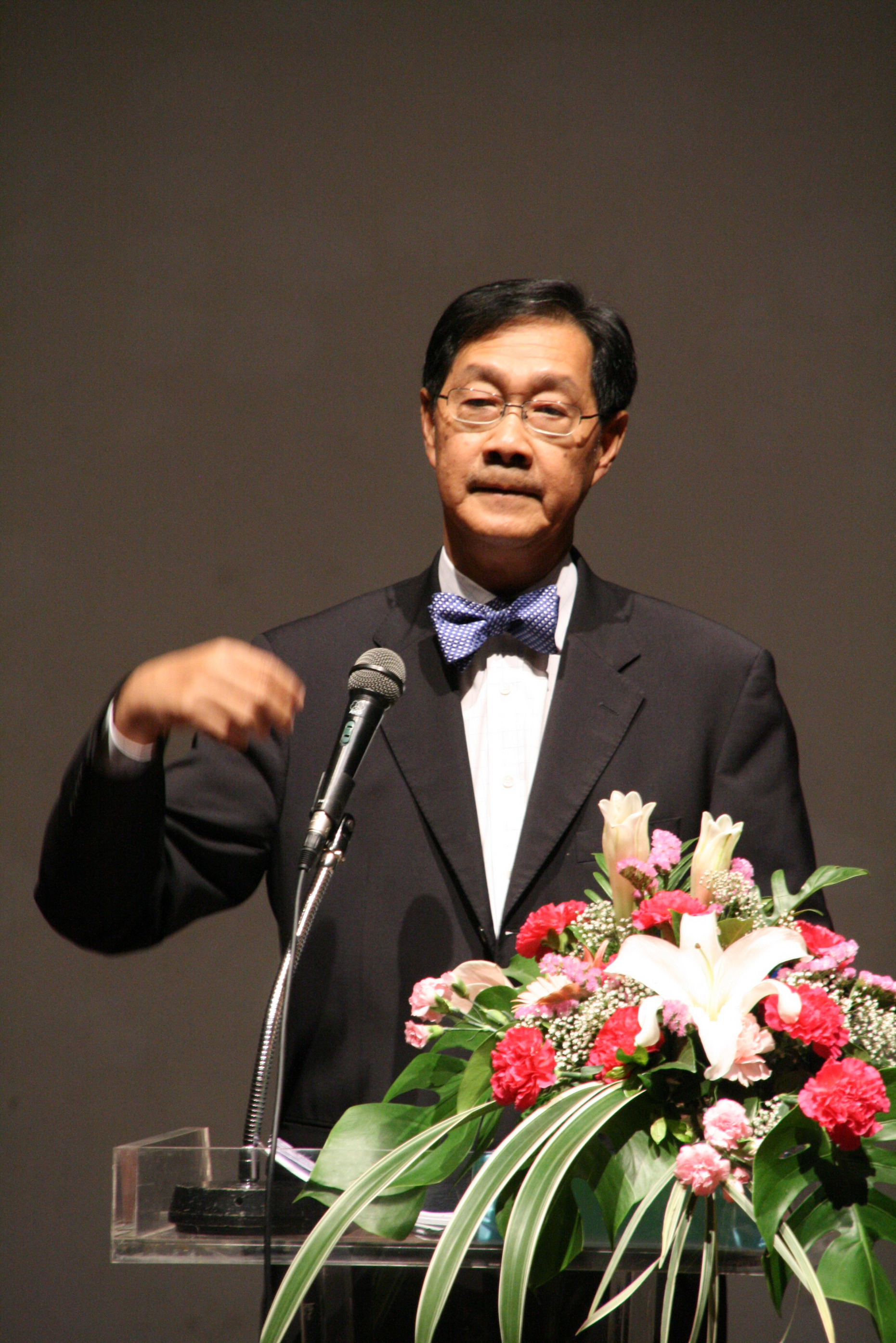

Deputy Prime Minister of Thailand
- In office 30 August 2014 – 20 August 2015
- Prime Minister: Prayut Chan-o-cha
- In office 8 October 2006 – 1 March 2007
- Prime Minister: Surayud Chulanont

Minister of Finance
- In office 8 October 2006 – 1 March 2007
- Prime Minister: Surayud Chulanont
- Preceded by: Thanong Bidaya
- Succeeded by: Chalongphob Sussangkarn

Governor of the Bank of Thailand
- In office 31 May 2001 – 6 October 2006
- Preceded by: Chatumongol Sonakul
- Succeeded by: Tarisa Watanagase

Personal details
- Born: 15 July 1947 (age 79) Bangkok, Thailand
- Party: Independent
- Spouses: Polin Inthasukit (div.); Prapaphan Devakula na Ayudhya
- Children: Nattakorn Devakula

Mom Rajawongse Pridiyathorn Devakula (Thai: หม่อมราชวงศ์ปรีดิยาธร เทวกุล; RTGS: Mom Ratchawong Pridiyathon Thewakun; [prīːdìjāːtʰɔːn tʰē:wâkūn]; born 15 July 1947) is a Thai economist. He was the Governor of the Bank of Thailand from 2001 to 2006. Following the 2006 Thai coup d'état he served as minister of finance and deputy prime minister in the interim civilian government led by Prime Minister Surayud Chulanont. Following the 2014 Thai coup d'état he was appointed a deputy prime minister in the first military appointed cabinet under General Prayut Chan-o-cha. Two days earlier he had resigned from his position as chairman of the board of Post Publishing PLC, the publisher of the Bangkok Post, Thailand's leading English-language newspaper.

== Early life and education ==
Pridiyathorn is a son of Prince Priditheppong Devakula. He is therefore a grandson of Prince Devawongse Varopakarn, and a great-grandson of King Rama IV. (Mongkut). Reflecting his distant royal descent, Thai media refer to him as Mom Ui (Thai: หม่อมอุ๋ย; "Lord Ui"), using his nickname, "Ui".

Pridiyathorn was educated at Saint Gabriel's College from year 1 to 12. During his childhood, Pridiyathorn rarely came second in school exams. He was nearly always first in his studies. He studied economics at Thammasat University, graduating with a bachelor's degree, and at the Wharton School of the University of Pennsylvania, where he earned an MBA in 1970.

== Career ==
From 1971 to 1990 he worked for the Thai Farmers Bank, becoming senior executive vice president. In 1990 he became official spokesman for Prime Minister Chatichai Choonhavan. In the governments of Anand Panyarachun and Suchinda Kraprayoon (1991–92) he was deputy minister of commerce. He was appointed a member of the Thai Senate from 1992 to 1993. In 1993 he became president of the Export-Import Bank of Thailand. Pridiyathorn served as the Chairman of the NIST International School Foundation, the governing body of NIST International School, from 2009 to 2017.

=== Bank of Thailand Governor ===
In May 2001 he was appointed Governor of the Bank of Thailand, the nation's central bank. He is also a director of the Civil Service Commission and of the Thammasat University Council. Pridiyathorn repeatedly criticised Prime Minister Thaksin Shinawatra who took office in 2001. Pridiyathorn disagreed with Thaksin's spending policy, which he saw as a cause of inflation.

In 2004, the state-owned Krung Thai Bank (KTB) shocked Thailand's financial world by reclassifying approximately 40 billion baht as problem loans. Pridiyathorn threatened to fire KTB chief executive officer Viroj Nualkhair if he did not resign. Viroj was a former financial advisor to media proprietor Sondhi Limthongkul, having helped him make the initial public offering of one of his first companies. As Krung Thai Bank head, Viroj had forgiven 1.6 billion baht of Sondhi's debts and arranged for further rounds of forgiveness. Using all his media outlets, Sondhi attacked Pridiyathorn and defended Viroj. Viroj was eventually forced to leave Krung Thai Bank. Sondhi's public criticism of Thaksin started to increase, eventually leading to the establishment of the People's Alliance for Democracy.

=== Deputy Prime Minister and Minister of Finance ===
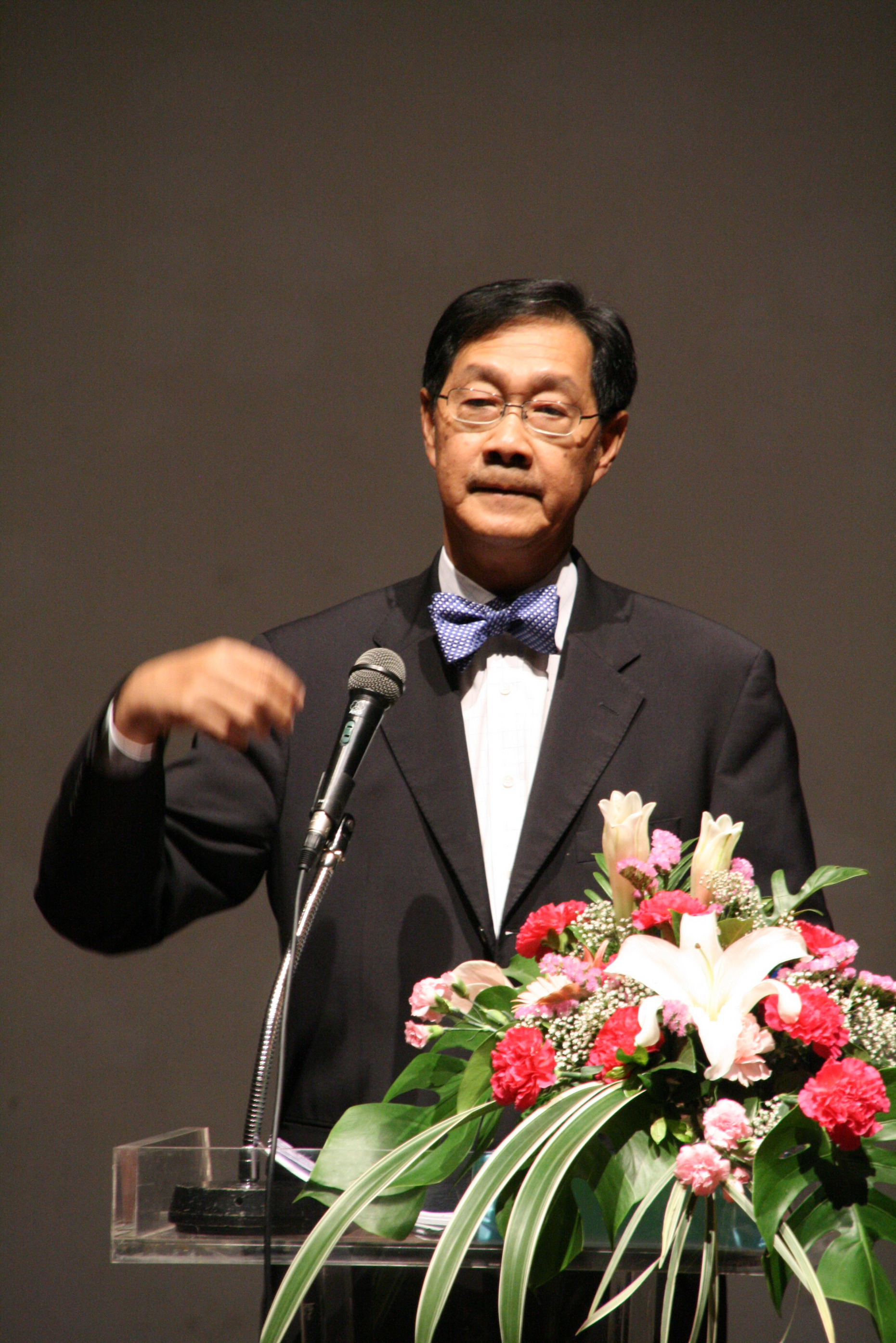
Mom Rajawongse Pridiyathorn at Fulbright Seminar II in 2009

Two days after the coup which deposed Prime Minister Thaksin Shinawatra, the Bangkok newspaper The Nation reported that business leaders had asked the junta (Council for Democratic Reform under Constitutional Monarchy) to appoint Pridiyathorn as an interim prime minister. He was notably endorsed by Chatri Sophonpanich, chairman of Bangkok Bank. Eventually, the junta chose retired general Surayud Chulanont as interim prime minister, but he in turn named Pridiyathorn to his cabinet as minister of finance, a move that business leaders saw as positive. He was succeeded as governor of the Bank of Thailand by Tarisa Watanagase, the first woman to head the BOT.

Pridiyathorn's policies as minister of finance included:

- Fiscal deficits. A budget deficit of 147 billion baht for fiscal year 2007. This was the first budget deficit since 2003. Fiscal deficits were also expected for 2008.
- Suvarnabhumi City. Pridiyathorn opposed the establishment of a new province, dubbed Suvarnabhumi City, around the newly constructed Suvarnabhumi Airport. The plan to establish a new province had been proposed by the deposed government of Thaksin Shinawatra. "There are a lot of retention ponds in the area and water experts said they serve as waterways, allowing floods to flow to the sea. If there are buildings, they will obstruct water from flowing out, and cause the inner city to flood. If the Department of Town and Country Planning proposes to build a community in the area, I'll oppose it," said Pridiyathorn.
- Capital controls. Pridiyathorn instituted capital controls to attempt to reverse a strengthening of the baht, but reversed the measure after the Thai stock market crashed, destroying US$20 billion of market value in one day. Pridiyathorn later noted that "This was not a mistake. Measures always have side effects. Once we knew the side effects, we quickly fixed it.... Just one day of stocks falling is not considered much damage." He came under harsh criticism. Bratin Sanyal, head of Asian equity investments at ING in Hong Kong noted, "The one thing worse than an incompetent central bank is an incompetent central bank that flip-flops." Catherine Tan, head of Asia Emerging Markets at Forecast in Singapore, noted, "They are proving themselves to be very unprofessional. Their actions are very irresponsible. They have totally lost credibility... I don't see foreigners returning to Thailand any time in the near future. Markets now have no confidence in the government." The Export-Import Bank of Thailand also criticized the capital controls.
- Limiting foreign companies investing in List I and II businesses (including media, telecoms, and aviation) from holding more than 50 percent of shares. List III businesses (including retailers and hotels) were exempted from the new restrictions. Investors holding more than 50 percent would be forced to lower their stakes within a year. Investors holding more than 50 percent of voting rights would be forced to lower their voting stakes within a year. Finance Minister Pridiyathorn noted, "If they [foreign investors] had seen the details [of the foreign investment law], I am sure that they would be happy." He later backtracked, and said that the changes would largely be limited to the telecom industry. The proposed changes in the investment rules—which were approved in principle by the cabinet and still needing approval by the National Legislative Assembly that was appointed after the coup—don't appear as sweeping as many investors had feared. Retailers, insurers, banks and brokers are specifically exempted from the proposed changes to the investment law. That effectively leaves hypermarket operators such as Tesco PLC of Britain and Carrefour SA of France, both of which have large chains in Thailand, off the hook.
- Corruption investigations into Thaksin Shinawatra. Pridiyathorn sparked controversy in his dealings with Jaruvan Maintaka of the junta-appointed Assets Examination Committee. Jaruvan accused Thaksin's wife of inappropriately buying a plot of land from the Financial Institutions Development Fund (FIDF) while Pridiyathorn was FIDF Chairman. Pridiyathorn asserted that the purchase was legal and refused to file charges, claiming that the FIDF was not a damaged party. Jaruvan then claimed that Pridiyathorn violated the law by sitting on the boards of more than three state enterprises. Pridiyathorn countered by claiming that Jaruvan was trying to destroy his reputation.
- Monetary policy. Pridiyathorn took the unusual step of urging the Bank of Thailand to cut interest rates by half a percentage point, rather than 25 basis points as expected by most analysts. Bank of Thailand is independent of the Ministry of Finance, and did not heed Pridiyathorn's call. He resigned the next day.

Pridiyathorn resigned on 28 February 2007. As a reason for his resignation he cited Premier Surayud's decision to appoint Pridiyathorn's rival, former Thaksin-government Finance Minister Somkid Jatusripitak, as a "self-sufficiency economy" special envoy. Somkid resigned from his position after less than a week. Another reason given was the Minister to the Office of the Prime Minister Thirapat Serirangsan's alleged preference for certain private media interests. Several analysts speculated that he was referring to the preferential treatment the junta gave to leading anti-Thaksin critic Sondhi Limthongkul, who was also a long-time critic of Pridiyathorn.

His resignation shocked the political world as well as the business community. "The reasons he gave were quite strange," noted Pornsilp Patcharinpanakul, deputy secretary-general of Board of Trade. Pridiyathorn was replaced by Chalongphob Sussangkarn. Junta leader General Saprang Kalayanamitr was also implicated in Pridiyathorn's resignation. The Bangkok Post reported that Pridiyathorn resigned in protest after a CNS member lobbied him to sell shares of IRPC (formerly known as Thai Petrochemical Industry or TPI) back to a former shareholder. Saprang's brother, Chienchuan, was a key financial advisor to Prachai Liaophairat, the estranged founder of TPI.

=== Economic advisor to the 2014 junta ===
Pridiyathorn was an outspoken critic of Yingluck Shinawatra's government, especially its scheme assuring a fixed minimum rice price to farmers. In November 2013 he estimated the costs of the programme at 425 billion baht. In February 2014 he called Yingluck's economic policies a failure and asked her to step down. Instead, he called for the appointment of a "neutral", unelected government.

After the 22 May 2014 coup d'état, the junta—which calls itself National Council for Peace and Order—appointed Somkid a member of its "advisory board" in charge of economic issues.

On 31 August Pridiyathorn was appointed a deputy prime minister in the first military-appointed cabinet under General Prayut Chan-o-cha.

== Wealth ==
Disclosures to the National Counter Corruption Commission revealed that 30 days after leaving his cabinet position in March 2007, Pridiyathorn had 730 million baht in assets, a slight drop from 754 million baht when he took office in October 2006. His wife, Praphaphan, had a net worth of 283 million baht, while his daughter Pudjeep had seven million baht.

In October 2014 the National Anti-Corruption Commission (NACC) published the declared wealth of all ministers in the cabinet. Pridiyathorn was the wealthiest with assets of 1.38 billion baht.

== Royal decorations ==
- Knight Grand Cordon (Special Class) of the Most Exalted Order of the White Elephant (2007)
- Knight Grand Cordon (Special Class) of the Most Noble Order of the Crown of Thailand (2003)
- Grand Companion (Third Class, upper grade) of the Most Illustrious Order of Chula Chom Klao (2004)
- King Rama IX Coronation Medal (1950)

== Ancestry ==
Ancestors of Pridiyathorn Devakula

16. Buddha Loetla Nabhalai, King Rama II
8. Mongkut, King Rama IV
17. Princess Bunrod
4. Devan Uthayavongse, the Prince Devavongse Varoprakarn
18. Taeng Suchritakul, Lord Asasamdaeng
9. Piam Sucharitakul
19. Nag Sucharitakul, Dame Sucharitthamrong
2. Prince Priditheppong Devakula
5. Puk Chandrasen
1. Pridiyathorn Devakula
3. Taengthai Dejpol

== See also ==
- Bank of Thailand

Government offices
Preceded by M.R. Chatumongol Sonakul	Governor of the Bank of Thailand; 2001-2006	Succeeded by Tarisa Watanagase
Political offices
Preceded by Thanong Bidaya	Minister of Finance; 2006-2007	Succeeded by Chalongphob Sussangkarn
