= Siam Devadhiraj =

Thai deity

Phra Siam Devadhiraj พระสยามเทวาธิราช
- guardian deity of Thailand
- Phra Siam Devadhiraj replica statue in Chiang Rai, holding a sword and a chakra
- Affiliation: Animism
- Abode: Thailand
- Artifacts: Golden idol of Phra Siam Devadhiraj, Phaisan Thaksin Throne Hall, Grand Palace, Bangkok

Phra Siam Devadhiraj (Thai: พระสยามเทวาธิราช, RTGS: Phra Sayam Thewathirat) is a guardian deity personifying supernatural protection over the country of Thailand. The deity (deva, a sanskrit origin word, sometimes translated as "god" or "angel") is represented by an idol enshrined in the Phaisan Thaksin Throne Hall of the Grand Palace. The statue, 8 in (200 mm) tall and made of solid gold, was commissioned by King Mongkut (Rama IV), probably around the years 1859–1860. It shows the deva in royal dress, holding a sword in the right hand and with the left hand at chest level in a blessing posture. The deity is worshipped in an annual private royal ceremony on the first waxing moon of the fifth Thai lunar month, which marks the traditional New Year in the Thai lunar calendar.

== See also ==
- National god
- Tutelary deity
