= Chatumongol Sonakul =

Thai minister and government official

Mom Rajawongse Chatumongol Sonakul
- จัตุมงคล โสณกุล
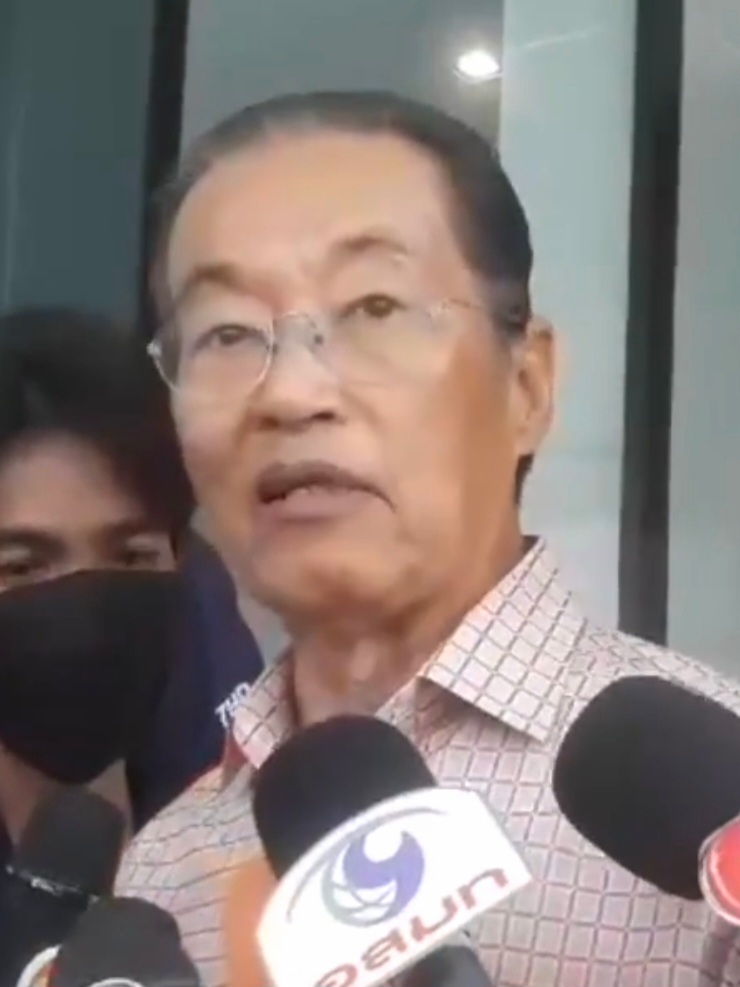
- Chatumongol in 2019

Minister of Labour
- In office 10 July 2019 – 20 July 2020
- Prime Minister: Prayut Chan-o-cha
- Preceded by: Adul Sangsingkeo
- Succeeded by: Suchart Chomklin

Governor of the Bank of Thailand
- In office 7 May 1998 – 30 May 2001
- Preceded by: Chaiwat Wiboonsawat
- Succeeded by: Pridiyathorn Devakula

Personal details
- Born: 28 September 1943 (age 83) Bangkok, Siam
- Party: Action Coalition for Thailand (until 2020)
- Other political affiliations: Democrat Party (until 2018)
- Spouses: Ratchani Kachaseni (divorced); Boonwipa Sonakul
- Children: Mingmongkol Sonakul; Ornmongkol Sonakul; Apimongkol Sonakul
- Education: Cambridge University; Harvard University
- Profession: Economist

Mom Ratchawongse Chatumongol Sonakul (Thai: จัตุมงคล โสณกุล, RTGS: Chattumongkhon Sonakun; born 28 September 1943) is Thailand's former Labour Minister and a former permanent secretary of the Ministry of Finance of Thailand, and Governor of the Bank of Thailand.

== Life and career ==
Chatumongkol is a descendant of Thailand's royal family (great-grandson of King Rama IV) and belongs to the noble house of Sonakul. He was educated at Harrow School and is an honors graduate of Cambridge University in England for engineering and economics and Harvard University in John F. Kennedy School of Government. He rose up through the civil service through the Finance Ministry, initially serving as Director-General of the Tax Department. Later he rose to be the ministry's deputy permanent secretary.

He was the permanent secretary (the most senior civil servant) in the Ministry of Finance from 1 October 1995 to 28 July 1997. This was during the flotation of the baht, which led to a massive devaluation, the Asian Financial Crisis, and a long period of International Monetary Fund intervention. He was dismissed by the Chavalit Yongchaiyudh government soon after the devaluation.

During the Democrat-led government that followed, Chatumongkol was appointed Governor of the Bank of Thailand, Thailand's central bank. He held this position from 1998 to 30 May 2001, when he was dismissed by the newly elected Thai Rak Thai-led government.

After his dismissal, Chatumongkol became a vocal critic of TRT leader Thaksin Shinawatra. He denigrated Thaksin's populist job-creating policies, claiming that "Any attempt to create petty jobs is unnecessary... Policies should focus on providing machines and know-how."

After a military junta overthrew Thaksin's government and canceled scheduled general elections in 2006, Chatumongkol was one of its favorites for the Premiership; eventually, General Surayud Chulanont was chosen by King Bhumibol. He hinted that if the Democrat Party won post-coup elections, he would enter the political arena in support of the Democrats. However, the Democrats were defeated in the elections.

When the Democrat Party gained control of the government in 2008, it appointed Chatumongkol as chairman of the Board of the Bank of Thailand.

He noted that under Thaksin's populist policies, "people who got money did not think hard about how to use it. People who got motorcycles became motorcycle taxi drivers. Many got rich. But when more people became motorcycle taxi drivers, they ended up earning just 100 baht [approximately US$3] a day. I used to survey some of those drivers. Many said they would not vote for [Thaksin's] Thai Rak Thai party anymore."

On 20 July 2020, Chatumongol resigned from the leader of Action Coalition for Thailand. For this reason, he dropped out of the position of Minister of Labor.

== Personal life ==
His son, Mom Luang Apimongkol Sonakul, was elected to be a Democrat Party MP in Bangkok in the former seat of Charoen Kantawongs.

== Awards and decorations ==
=== National honours ===
- Thailand:
  - Knight Grand Cordon (Special Class) of the Most Exalted Order of the White Elephant
  - Knight Grand Cordon (Special Class) of The Most Noble Order of the Crown of Thailand
  - Knight Grand Commander (Second Class, higher grade) of the Most Illustrious Order of Chula Chom Klao
  - Chakrabarti Mala Medal

Government offices
| Preceded by Chaiwat Wiboonsawat | Governor of the Bank of Thailand; 1998–2001 | Succeeded by M.R. Pridiyathorn Devakula |
