= Bank of Thailand =

Monetary authority of Thailand

Bank of Thailand ธนาคารแห่งประเทศไทย
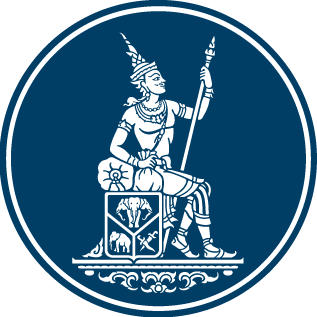
- Seal of Siam Devadhiraj, guardian deity of Thailand holding a money bag and a sceptre

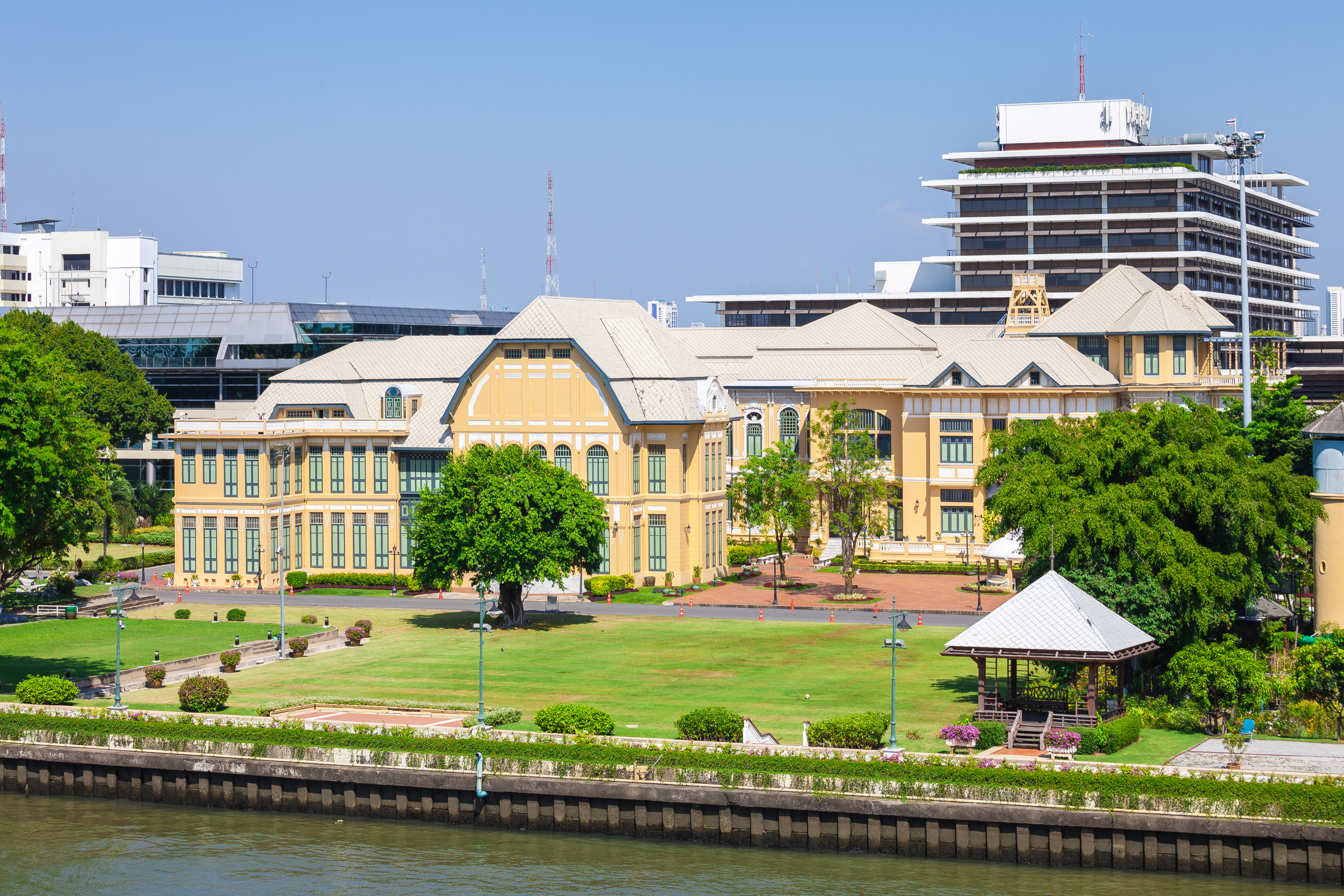
- Bang Khun Phrom Palace
- Headquarters: Phra Nakhon, Bangkok, Thailand
- Coordinates: 13.7689°N 100.5009°E
- Established: 28 April 1942 (legal); 10 December 1942 (began operations)
- Governor: Vitai Ratanakorn
- Central bank of: Kingdom of Thailand
- Currency: Thai baht THB (ISO 4217)
- Reserves: US$243.49 billion (2023)
- Bank rate: 2%
- Website: www.bot.or.th

The Bank of Thailand (BOT; abbr. ธปท.; Thai: ธนาคารแห่งประเทศไทย, RTGS: thanakhan haeng prathet thai) is the central bank of Thailand.

== History ==
The Bank of Thailand (BOT) was first set up as the Thai National Banking Bureau. The Bank of Thailand Act was promulgated on 28 April 1942 vesting upon the Bank of Thailand the responsibility for all central banking functions. The Bank of Thailand started operations on 10 December 1942.

The Bank of Thailand Act, B.E. 2485 was later amended in order to put emphasis on its social responsibility, to create a mechanism to guard against economic crisis, as well as to set up its decision making process to ensure good governance and transparency in the organization. The Bank of Thailand Act, B.E. 2551 came into force on 4 March 2008.

=== Project Nexus ===
The Bank for International Settlements signed an agreement with Central Bank of Malaysia, Bank of Thailand, Bangko Sentral ng Pilipinas, Monetary Authority of Singapore, and the Reserve Bank of India on 30 June 2024 as founding member of Project Nexus, a multilateral international initiative to enable retail cross-border payments. Bank Indonesia was involved as a special observer. The platform, which is expected to go live by 2026, will interlink domestic fast payment systems of the member countries.

== Roles and responsibilities ==
The Bank of Thailand's mission is to provide a stable financial environment for sustainable economic growth in order to achieve continuous improvement in the standard of living of the people of Thailand.

== Governors ==
The Governor of the Bank of Thailand has a five-year term of not more than two consecutive terms. The Minister of Finance nominates a candidate to the Thai Cabinet, who pass a resolution approving the candidate, then it is presented to the Monarch for approval.

=== List of governors ===
| # | Name | Took office | Left office |
|---|---|---|---|
| 1 (First term) | Prince Vivadhanajaya | 27 November 1942 | 16 October 1946 |
| 2 (First term) | Serm Vinicchayakul | 17 October 1946 | 24 November 1947 |
| 3 (First term) | Leng Srisomwongse | 25 November 1947 | 2 September 1948 |
| 1 (Second term) | Prince Vivadhanajaya | 3 September 1948 | 2 December 1948 |
| 3 (Second term) | Leng Srisomwongse | 3 December 1948 | 3 August 1949 |
| 4 | M.L. Dej Snidvongs | 4 August 1949 | 29 February 1952 |
| 2 (Second term) | Serm Vinicchayakul | 1 March 1952 | 24 July 1955 |
| 5 | Kasem Sriphayak | 25 July 1955 | 23 July 1958 |
| 6 | Jote Guna-Kasem | 24 July 1958 | 3 May 1959 |
| 7 | Puey Ungphakorn | 11 June 1959 | 15 August 1971 |
| 8 | Bisudhi Nimmanhaemin | 16 August 1971 | 23 May 1975 |
| 9 | Snoh Unakul | 24 May 1975 | 31 October 1979 |
| 10 | Nukul Prachuabmoh | 1 Nov 1979 | 13 September 1984 |
| 11 | Kamchorn Sathirakul | 14 September 1984 | 5 March 1990 |
| 12 | Chavalit Thanachanan | 6 March 1990 | 30 September 1990 |
| 13 | Vijit Supinit | 1 October 1990 | 1 July 1996 |
| 14 | Rerngchai Marakanond | 13 July 1996 | 28 July 1997 |
| 15 | Chaiwat Wiboonsawat | 31 July 1997 | 4 May 1998 |
| 16 | M.R. Chatumongol Sonakul | 7 May 1998 | 30 May 2001 |
| 17 | M.R. Pridiyathorn Devakula | 31 May 2001 | 6 October 2006 |
| 18 | Tarisa Watanagase | 8 November 2006 | 30 September 2010 |
| 19 | Prasarn Trairatvorakul | 1 October 2010 | 30 September 2015 |
| 20 | Veerathai Santiprabhob | 1 October 2015 | 30 September 2020 |
| 21 | Sethaput Suthiwartnarueput | 1 October 2020 | 30 September 2025 |
| 22 | Vitai Ratanakorn | 1 October 2025 | Present |

== See also ==
- Thai baht
- Economy of Thailand
- Bank of Thailand Museum
- List of central banks
- List of financial supervisory authorities by country
