= Sophon Ratanakorn =

President of the Supreme Court of Thailand

Sophon Ratanakorn (Thai: โสภณ รัตนากร; 15 April 1931 – 30 September 2018) was president of the Supreme Court of Thailand, serving from 1990 to 1991.

Born in Chumphon, he was educated at Thammasat University (LLB, 1952) and King's College London (LLM, 1965).
