= Thailand Development Research Institute =

Thai think tank

Coordinates: 13.764933°N 100.605180°E

- สถาบันวิจัยเพื่อการพัฒนาประเทศไทย
- Formation: 1984

The Thailand Development Research Institute (TDRI; Thai: สถาบันวิจัยเพื่อการพัฒนาประเทศไทย) is a non-profit non-government Thai policy think tank focused on social and economic development issues based in Bangkok, Thailand. The institute has seven major research programs: Human resources and social development; international economic relations; macroeconomic policy; natural resources and environment; science and technology development; sectoral economics; and Law for development.

== History ==
TDRI was established by the initiative of the National Economic and Social Development Board as a public policy research institute in 1984 with the intention of creating a research agency that is independent from the government and bureaucracy. Thai Prime Minister General Prem Tinsulanonda and Prime Minister Pierre Trudeau of Canada therefore signed an agreement to provide assistance granting funds through the Canadian International Development Agency to establish the institution. In addition, the United States Agency for International Development also provided funding for the establishment along with other private companies such as Mitsui Group and Unocal Corporation. It is a private non-profit foundation and it provides technical analysis (mostly in economic areas) to various public agencies to help formulate policies to support long-term economic and social development in Thailand. Its current income is mostly derived from government contracts and funding from international organizations.

== Mission ==
In line with this central objective, it is mandated to:

- Conduct policy research
- Network extensively with other institutions and individuals engaged in policy research, both in Thailand and abroad
- Disseminate its research results to ensure maximum impact on policy-making
