= List of Free Thai Movement groups and networks =

The Free Thai Movement or Seri Thai (Thai: เสรีไทย) was a Thai underground resistance movement against the Empire of Japan and its allies within the regime of Marshal Plaek Phibunsongkhram during World War II. The wartime Seri Thai movement is often looked by modern public consensus as a united resistance movement against the Japanese war efforts. However, in reality the movement is splintered between ideologies, method of operations, parent organizations and geography with personnel ranging from 30,000 to 100,000 members among all groups.

== Major movements ==
- Free Thai Movement (FTM) or the American Branch (เสรีไทยสายอเมริกา) organized by Thai Minister to United States, Mom Rajawongse Seni Pramoj by refusing to handover the declaration of war between Thai government and the United States. As a result of this act, he managed to secure an alliance with American officials and managed to recruit Thai members in the United States for the cause. The US State Department recognized his movement as a representation of Thai state under Japanese occupation.
  - Detachment 404 - Part of the Office of Strategic Services (OSS) operation based in Kandy, Ceylon. The unit laid groundwork for Thai resistance in cooperation with interior networks.
- Free Siamese Movement (FSM) (later Thai Resistance Movement by the British Government) or the British Branch (เสรีไทยสายอังกฤษ) Unlike the Thai resistance movement led by Pramoj in the United States, the British perspective is more negative to the Thais because Thailand have succeeded in declaring their war against the British government and betrayed the Anglo-Thai Non-Aggression Pact of 1940. The British government did not recognize this movement as the part of Thai government in exile and all members of the Free Siamese Movement who fought are paid as British servicemen.
  - Queen Rambai Barni Network often called "Non-Military Network". The widowed queen of exiled-King Prajadhipok (Rama VII) became one of the most influential Thai persona in the British Branch of the movement, she used her wealth to support and sponsored her servants and Thai students in Britain to join the resistance She used her political position on helping Thai members gain more trust from the British government and relieving them from enemy alien status within the Royal Pioneer Corps to full military agent duties.
  - Mom Chao (Prince) Suphasawatwongsanit Sawatdiwat, Brother of Queen Rambai Barni led the Military Network as 253 Company, Pioneer Corps for Special Operations Executive. This group of operatives reached India on 26 April 1943 and were separated into SOE's Force 136, Secret Intelligence Service, and the Military Intelligence Section 9.
- Interior Branch (government officials)
  - Civilian officials led by Pridi Banomyong (Codenamed "Ruth" by the Allies), minister of finance (1938–1941), senior regent of the young king Ananda Mahidol (Rama VIII) and an influential member of Khana Ratsadon's civilian wing. Initially he organized a hidden movement of Thai civil servants as the "X.O.Group" during the Japanese Invasion and the subsequent ascension into the Axis powers by Phibun's regime. He and his associates planned to raise a rival government-in-exile in British Raj but after Burma was captured by the Japanese forces and the refusal of the British government he pivoted his plans to coincide with Free Thai Movement in the United States. In April 1942, Pridi covertly sent Chamkat Balankura to Chungking (Chongqing) to negotiate with Chiang Kai-shek on forfeiting Thai declaration of war against China and their allies.
  - Police officials - Police general Luang Aduldejaraj, Director General of the Royal Thai Police led the police branch of the interior Seri Thai movement. Together with Pridi, Aduldejaraj merged various freedom fighter groups together under the umbrella of American OSS support on 22 September 1944 through Operation Hotfoot and Operation Numeral. His police force is responsible for "arrests" of foreign spies and Free Thai Movement members from abroad and send them to special bureau in Bangkok.
  - Military officials - After Khuang Aphaiwong was elected as the new prime minister in August 1944. Many military officials have joined the covert aggression against the Japanese war efforts such as Captain Luang Suphachalasai Minister of Interior and Lieutenant General Chit Mansin Sinatyotharak Minister of Defense and head of the Royal Thai Army. The resistance movement in the Royal Thai Air Force is led by Air Vice Marshal Luang Tevaritpanluek, deputy commander of the Field Air Force attached to Phayap Army in Burma. The resistance in the Royal Thai Navy is led by Rear Admiral Luang Sangwonyutthakij with political support from Lieutenant Commander Thonglor Khamhiran, a marine commander turns minister (unassigned to any office).

Interior Branch (regional) such as

Tiang Sirikhanth and Thong-In Phuriphat, major leaders from the Isan Branch of Seri Thai Movement.

- Isan (Northeastern) Branch (เสรีไทยสายอีสาน) composed of four influential Isan men dubbed "Four Warlords of Isan" (4 ขุนพลภาคอีสาน) or "Four Tigers of Isan" (4 เสืออีสาน)
  - Sakon Nakhon Network - Led by Tiang Sirikhanth nicknamed "Warlord of Phu Phan" (ขุนพลภูพาน) (Codenamed "Pluto" by SOE Force 136) managed to recruit and trained 3,500 members. He was appointed as the leader of Thai Civilian Army (กองทัพพลเรือน ท.พ.ร.). Military training is overseen under Khrong Chandawong supervision in the areas of Phu Phan Mountains.
  - Maha Sarakham Network - Led by Chamlong Daoruang, trained 4,000 members
  - Ubon Ratchathani Network - Led by Thong-In Phuriphat, trained 3,000 members
  - Roi Et Network - Led by Tawhil Udol
  - Nhong Kai Network - 200 Members
  - Nakhon Phanom Network - 800 Members
  - Udon Thani Network - 1,200 Members
  - Loei Network
  - Khon Kaen Network - Led by Udom Boonprakob (อุดม บุญประกอบ), Governor of Khon Kaen
  - Chaiyaphum Network
  - Nakhon Ratchasima Network
- Central Branch (เสรีไทยสายภาคกลาง)
  - Chonburi Network - Led by Thawi Bunyaket and supported by the Royal Thai Navy under Rear Admiral Luang Sangwonyutthakij the movement have managed to train 2,000 members and acquired most sophisticated Allied weapons compared to other networks.
  - Petchaburi Network - 4,300 Members
  - Phra Nakorn (Bangkok) Network
  - Chachoengsao Network - 132 members
  - Ayutthaya Network
  - Uthai Thani Network - Led by Prong Pbuchon (นายปรง พบูชนม์) Governor of Uthai Thani
  - Angthong Network
  - Kanchanaburi Network
  - Nakhon Pathom Network
- Northern Branch (เสรีไทยสายเหนือ)
  - Lampang Network - Led by Luang Subphakarn Borirak (หลวงศุภการบริรักษ์), the governor of Lampang and major general Sut Sutthisanronnakon commander of the 4th Infantry Division with support from the commander of the 13th Infantry Regiment and the overseer of Lampang military district, Colonel Sarit Thanarat. The Lampang movement is planned to link up with British Twelfth Army if the Allied breakthrough in Northern Burma succeeded.
  - Tak Network
  - Sukhothai Network
  - Phrae Network - Led by Thong Kanthathum, MP of Phrae Province and Minister without position.
  - Uttaradit Network
- Southern Branch (เสรีไทยสายใต้)
  - Hua Hin Network - 1,000 members
  - Prachuap Khiri Khan Network - Led by Charn Bunnag, Thai Filmmaker
  - Chumphon Network
  - Ranong Network
  - Nakhon Si Thammarat Network

Allied zones of responsible

After Pridi communicated with British officer Victor Jaques of Force 136 about the organization of regional cells of the Free Thai Movement within Thailand and the ascension of Khuang Aphaiwong as the new "Seri Thai" Prime Minister (August 1944 - August 1945) in place of the resigned Marshal Phibun. The Allied Forces have divided their responsibilities into British and American zones. The British SOE handles the provinces of Ang Thong, Ayutthaya, Uthai Thani, Phetchaburi, Kanchanaburi, Suphan Buri, Sukhothai, Chaiyaphum, Chonburi, Chachoengsao, Prachinburi, Chumphon, Phrae and Chiang Rai while the American OSS take the responsibility of Ranong, Surat Thani, Nakhon Si Thammarat, Khon Kaen, Nakhon Ratchasima, Maha Sarakham, Nhong Khai, Nakhon Phanom,Sakon Nakhon, Loei, Ubon Ratchathani, Tak and Lampang

Secret airfields

In 1945, many secret airfields have been built and utilized by the resistance members in Isan area. such as

- Wong Waen or Khai Wong Waen Airfield (สนามบินวงแหวน/ค่ายวงแหวน) and Kueak Mah Airfield (สนามบินเกือกม้า), Sakon Nakhon
- Khai Na Pong Airfield (สนามบินค่ายนาโป่ง) and Pla Pak or Pah Pak Airfield (สนามบินปลาปาก/ป่าปาก), Nakhon Phanom
- Nakhu Airfield (สนามบินนาคู), Kalasin
- Phu Kheo Airfield (สนามบินภูเขียว), Part of Loei Province, now part of Chaiyaphum
- Non Than or Non Han Airfield (สนามบินโนนทัน/โนนหัน), Khon Kaen
- Kud Chiang Mhee Airfield (สนามบินกุดเชียงหมี), Khemrat Airfield (สนามบินเขมราฐ), Suwanwaree Airfield (สนามบินสุวรรณวารี), Ubon Ratchathani

other airfields includes

- Tak Provincial Airfield (สนามบินจังหวัดตาก), Tak
- Tah Takhreo Airfield (สนามบินท่าตะกร้อ), Petchaburi

== Minor movements ==
Foreign minor movements

- The Chinese Branch (เสรีไทยสายจีน) often shadowed by the American OSS operations in China and the Southeast Asian region. The Chinese Branch of Seri Thai consisted of Chinese-born agents who operated in and out of Thailand during the war. Many had the ranks in the National Revolutionary Army of Chiang Kai Shek. Some agents such as Prasit Rakpracha (Chinese name Pan Zhi Ming) are an alumnus of Whampoa Military Academy 14th Class. During the war, Whampoa Academy have organized the 17th Class to train Thai-chinese agents also known as Overseas Chinese Cadet Regiment (กรมนักเรียนนายร้อยชาวจีนโพ้นทะเล) in Thai.
- Operation Savanna (Not to be confused with SOE operation with the same name conducted in France during 1941) - Group of British trained Thai agents that were dropped by B-24 Liberators to link up with Thai resistance in Lampang-Chiang Mai area.
- Operation Brillig September 1944 operation consisted of two-man Thai agents from SOE Force 136 airdropped in Hua Hin area with a letter from Admiral Lord Mountbatten, the commander of the British South-East Asia Command with an objective of contacting local Thai resistance.
- OSS Radio Station operated by Major John D. Wester and Major Richard S. Greenlee with other Thai agents situated on Rama V Road in front of Vajiravudh College. Later Wester was replaced with Captain Howard Palmer.
- Operation Durian - An OSS operation tied to Detachment 404 composed of Thai personnel.
- Operation Pattern - First special operations team sent by Detachment 404 sent into Thailand on May 1945 with an objective to promote good will between the US government and share important intelligence.
- Operation Bucket - A hidden group of OSS agents working alongside Royal Thai Air Force 61st Bomber Squadron operating with Martin 139 (B-10) bombers from Phu Kheo Airfield, Chaiyaphum Province.
- Operation Diagram - Further reinforcement of OSS agents at Phu Kheo led by American art-historian turned agent Major Alexander Brown Griswold
- Lao Issara - Led by Laotian aristocrat Phoui Sananikone (Also known as Thao-Un ท้าวอุ่น and Nicknamed by Phibun as Hotfeet Coldfeet เท้าอุ่น ตีนเย็น) The group was supported by Khuang Aphaiwong's government, trained and equipped in Thai territories, the group managed to liberate Savannakhet and Thakhek from Japanese control.

Interior minor movements

- Thai Kick Movement (ขบวนการไทยถีบ) is a group of Thai vigilantes who raided Southern railway lines during the war. As the Thai government relied on Japanese-supplied banknotes supplied from Occupied Java to supplement existing banknotes made by Thomas De La Rue Company these vigilantes targeted these valuable resources alongside their occasional raids for weapons and food. While proven to be an obstacle for Japanese forces, the Thai Kick Movement was never considered as official resistance movement by other Thai organizations.
- Military Police Cadets (นักเรียนนายทหารสารวัตร) a government led program of the recruitment of Chulalongkorn and Thammasat students to work as the wartime military police. The program was organized by Luang Sangwonyutthakij but were kept under close surveillance from suspicion by the Japanese garrison of General Aketo Nakamura. The group has 700 members at its peak and were sent to train with Major Francis Lotterle at Chonburi. When the war with Japan ended in September 1945, the unit is still in training and were deployed as military police against Chinese Triads after the war.
- Anti-Japanese Volunteer Movement (กองอาสาสมัครต่อต้านญี่ปุ่น) also known as Khana Thai Issara (คณะไทยอิสสระ) organized by workers and socialists. Started by the workers of the Tobacco Authority factory and spread to Thai-Chinese workers in match factories. They hindered Japanese war effort by making a strike on Japanese essential supplies production. At the height of the movement there are 170 factories that joined the cause, with 35 factories responsible for making supplies of the Japanese Army
- United Workers of Bangkok (สหบาลกรรมกรนครกรุงเทพฯ) an extension of Anti-Japanese Volunteer Movement within the workers of Bangkok. The movement comprises seven sub-groups.
  - Bangkok society of the mechanical workers (สมาคมสหการช่างกลกรุงเทพฯ)
  - Sawmill workers association (สมาคมกรรมกรโรงเลื่อยจักร)
  - Match factory workers association (สมาคมกรรมกรโรงงานไม้ขีดไฟ)
  - Leatherworker association (สมาคมกรรมกรช่างเย็บหนัง)
  - Letterpress printer association (สมาคมกรรมกรช่างเรียงพิมพ์)
  - Chin Lao working women's association (สมาคมกรรมกรสตรีฉินเหลาฯ)
  - United worker's friendship society of Bangkok (สมาคมสหมิตรแรงงานกรุงเทพฯ)
- Phibun's Movement (Debatable) while losing his grasp on his prime minister position from his attempt to relocate Thai capital to Phetchabun in 1943. It was debated by modern scholars that Marshal Phibunsongkhram envisioned Phetchabun, surrounded by mountains to be his last stronghold against the Japanese occupation in the scenario that Thai government managed to create an uprising against Japan or vice versa if Japan tries to enforce their grip on Thai autonomy. Another source of this theory is how Phibun started to distance himself from the Japanese cooperation by not attending Greater East Asia Co-Prosperity Sphere meetings, attempted to contact Chinese 93rd Division and almost launched a self-coup to purge the Japanese conspirators within his ranks. However, all of Phibun's plan are stopped when Khuang Aphaiwong, with political support from Pridi became the prime minister.

== Gallery ==
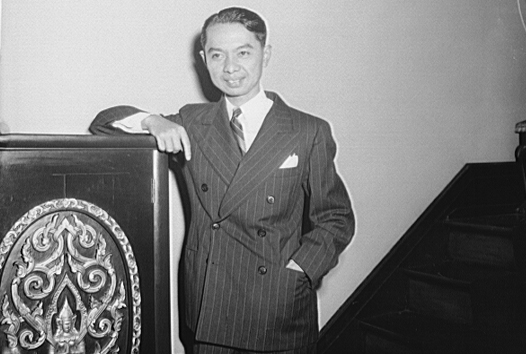
Mom Rajawongse Seni Pramoj, Leader of American Branch of the Free Thai Movement, September 1944

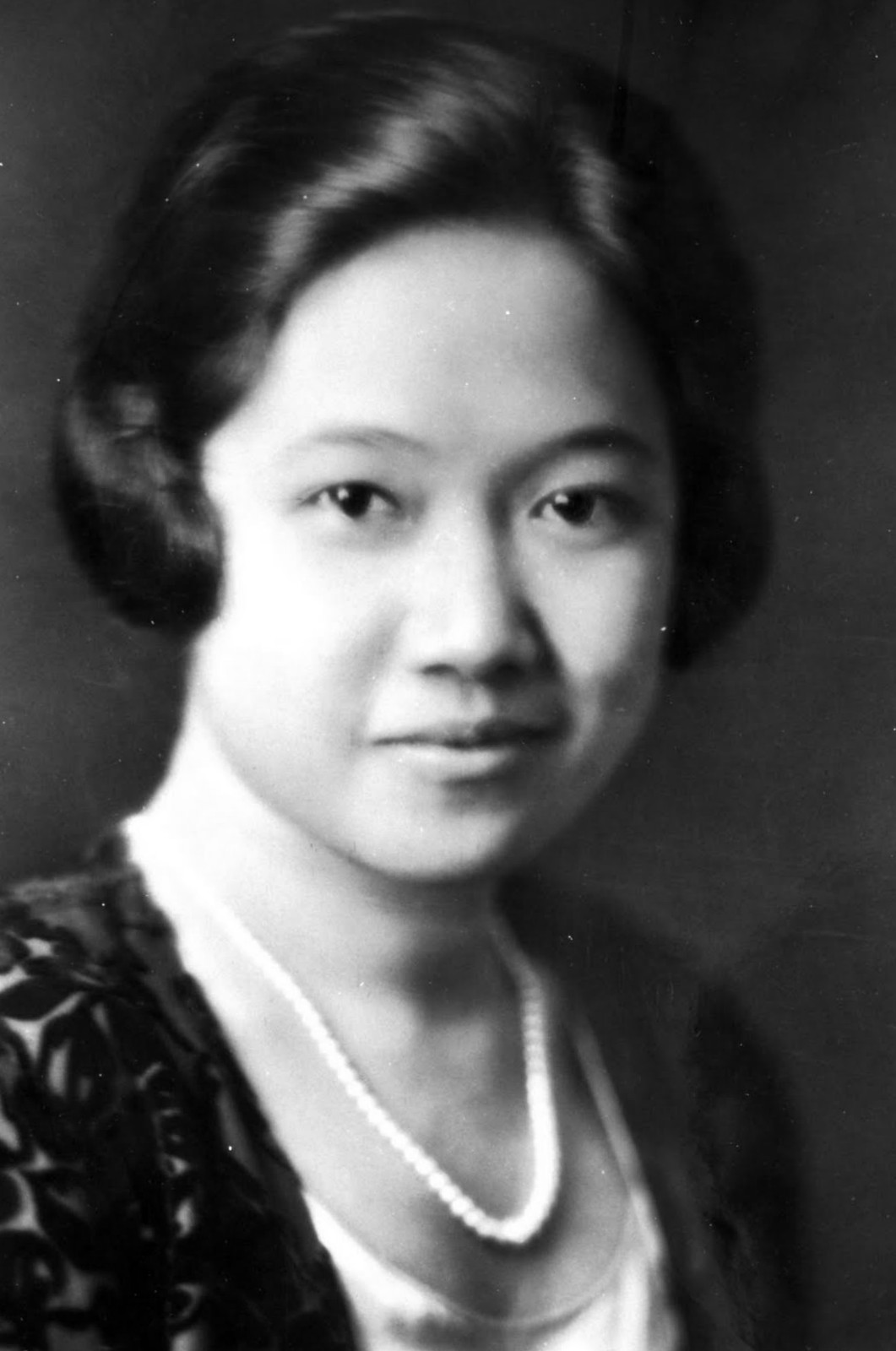
Queen Rambhai Barni, supporter of the British Branch of the Free Thai Movement

Mom Chao (Prince) Suphasawatwongsanit Sawatdiwat head of Free Thai Movement in Britain

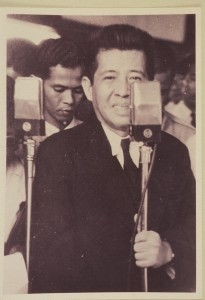
Pridi Banomyong, the civilian leader of Khana Ratsadon and organizer of internal Free Thai Movement

Chamkat Balankura, Thai secret diplomat who went to China to rally Allied support

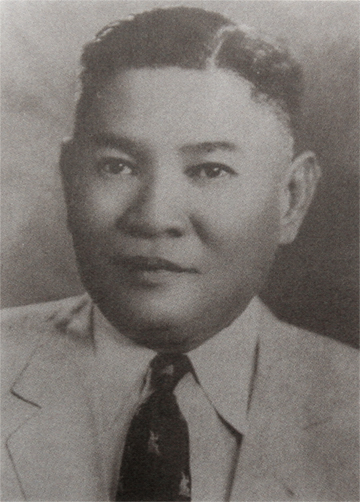
Tawee Bunyaket, Secretary of the Cabinet and Pridi's right hand man

Tiang Sirikhanth in military uniform and Allied officers

Khuang Abhaiwong, Second wartime Thai Prime Minister and the associate of Free Thai Movement

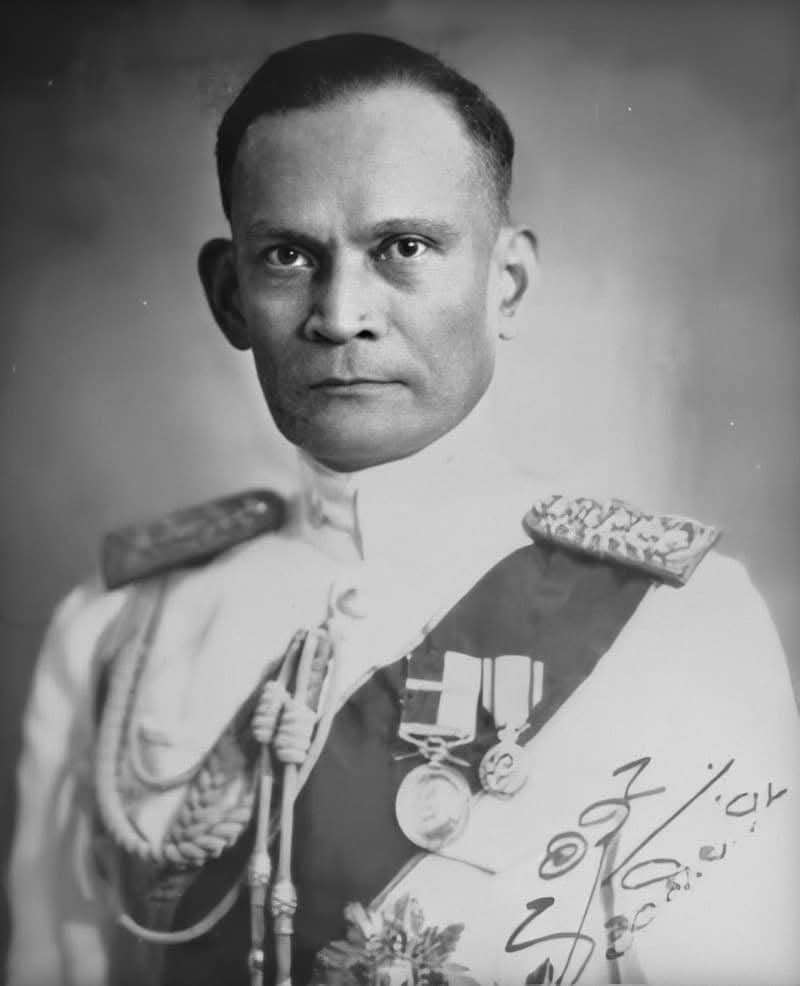
Police General Luang Aduldejaraj, Director General of the Royal Thai Police

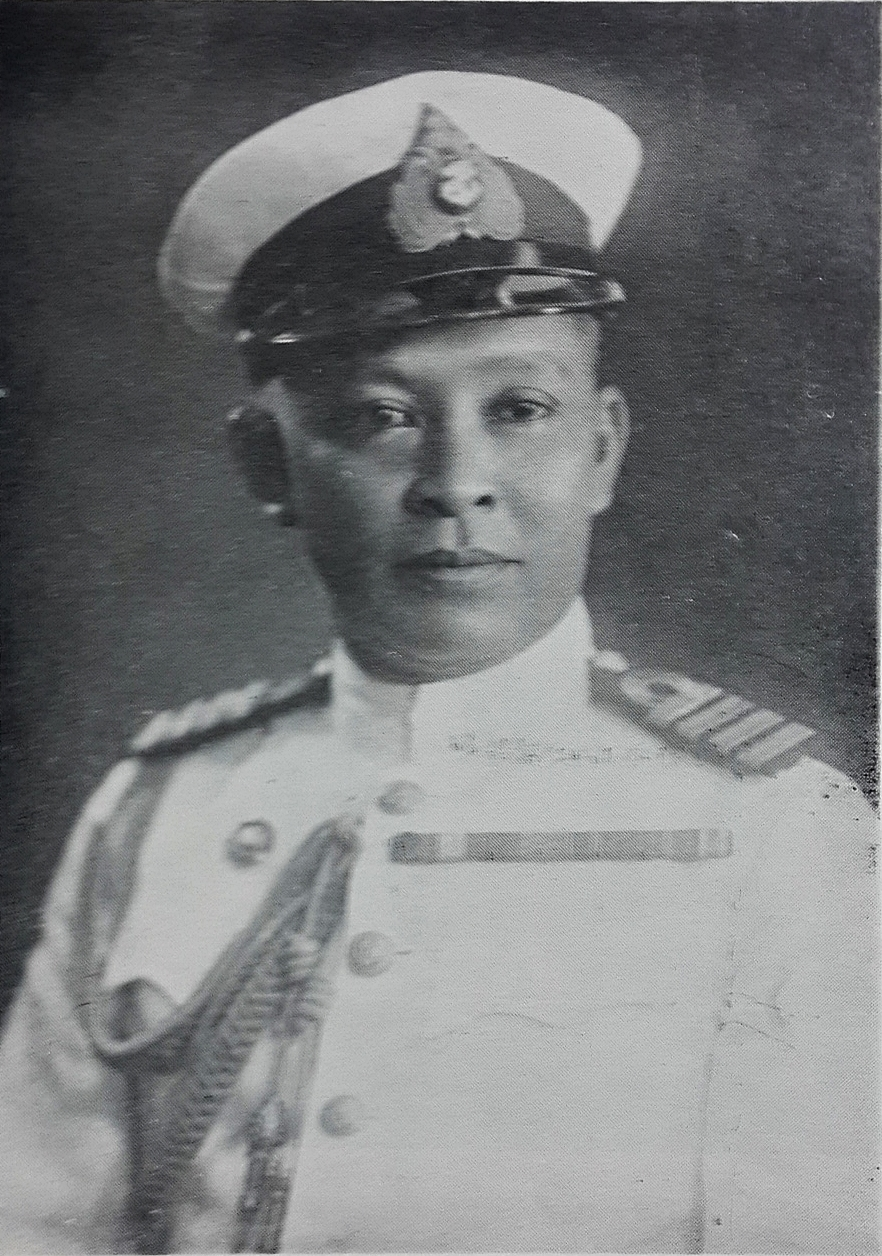
Captain Luang Suphachalasai Minister of Interior

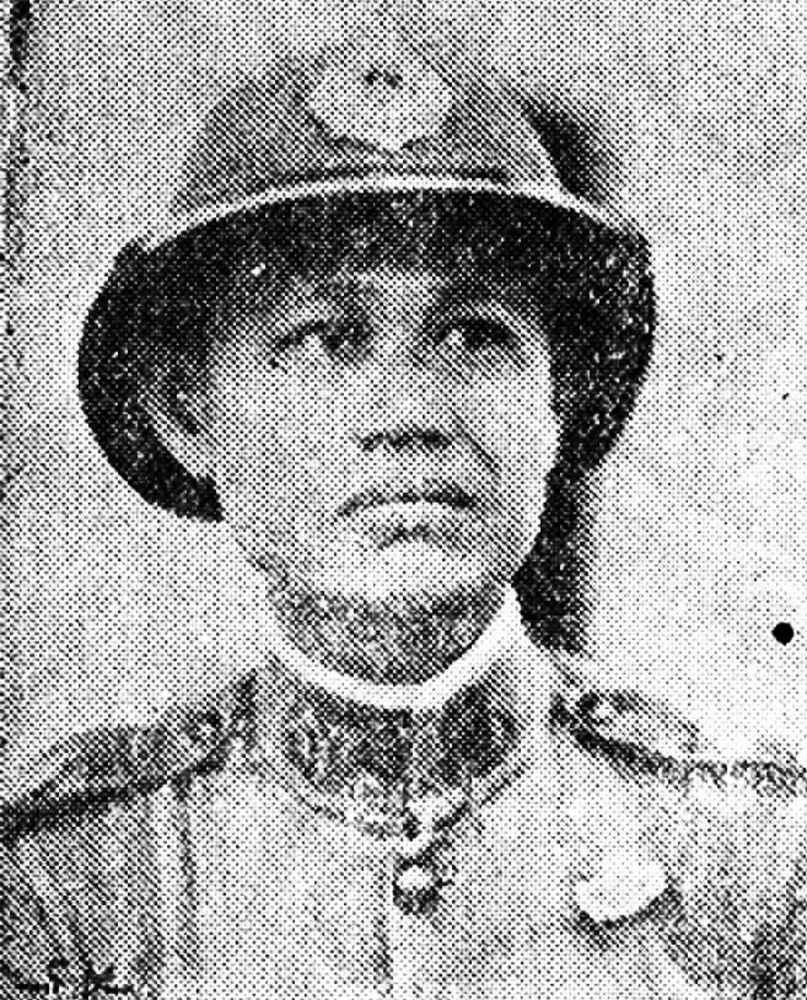
Lieutenant General Chit Mansin Sinatyotharak Minister of Defense and head of the Royal Thai Army

Rear Admiral Luang Sangwonyutthakij of the Royal Thai Navy
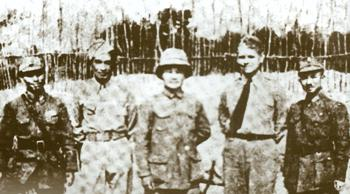
Mom Luang Karb Kunjara (second from left) in China

Phon Intharathat (first from left) and Free Thai Movement in the United States

(From left to right) Mom Luang Karb Kunjara, Jintana Yossoonthorn, Phon Intharathat

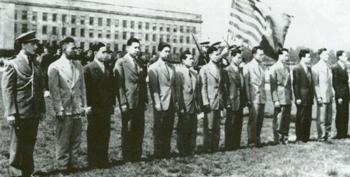
Receivers of Medal for Freedom, September 1945

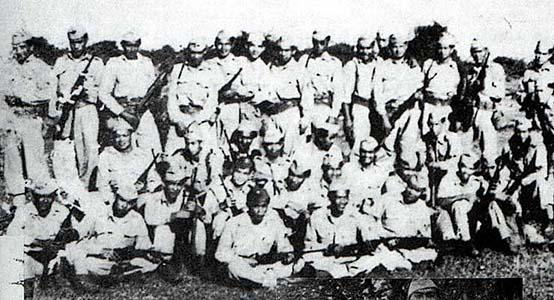
Armed members of the Free Thai Movement during the Japanese occupation.

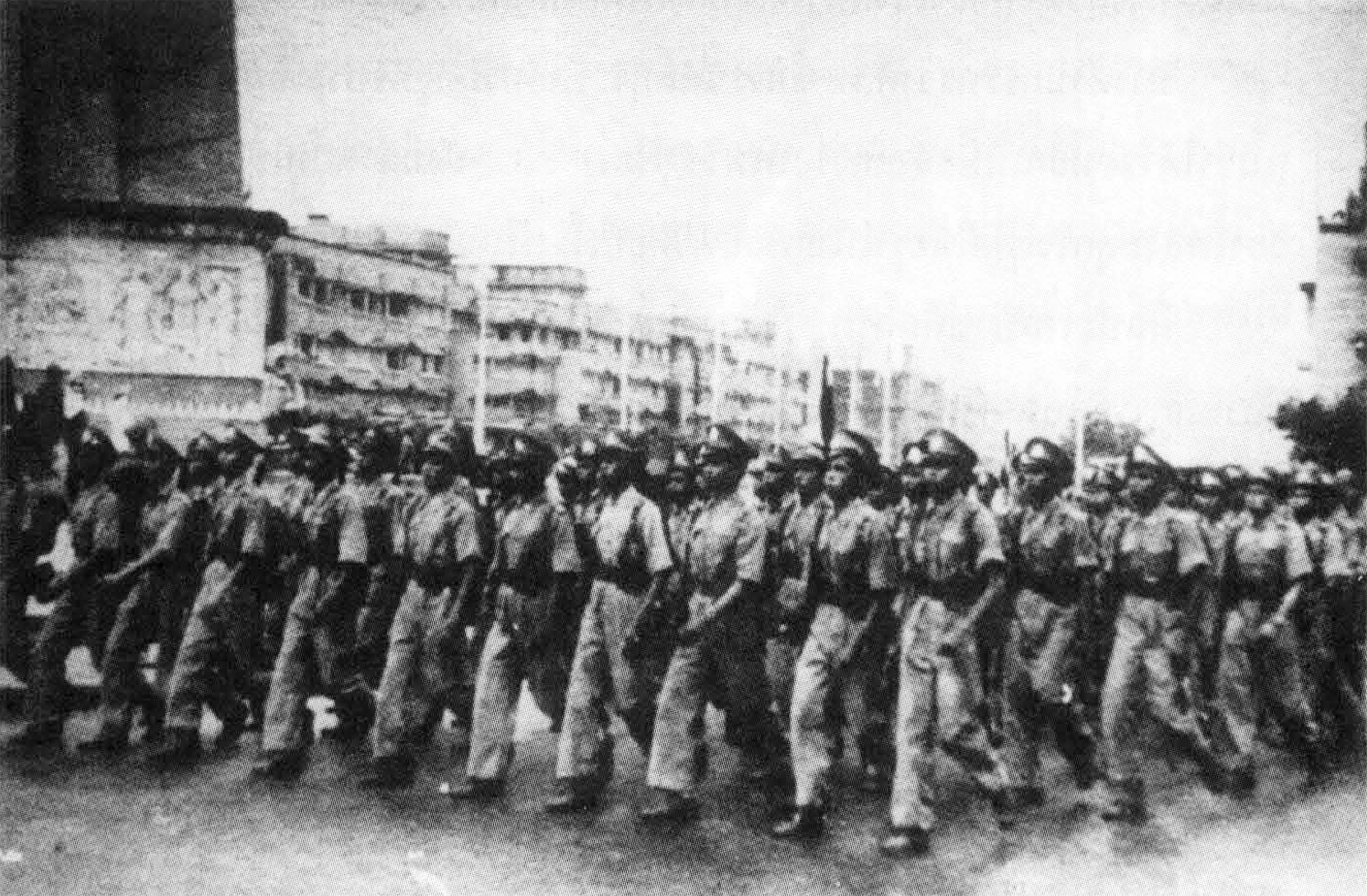
Members of the Free Thai Movement on the parade following the end of hostilities in Asia, 1945

== See also ==
- Thailand in World War II
- Free Thai Movement
- Force 136
- Special Operations Executive
- Office of Strategic Services
