= Direk Jayanama =

Thai diplomat and politician (1905–1967)

Direck Jayanama
- ดิเรก ชัยนาม
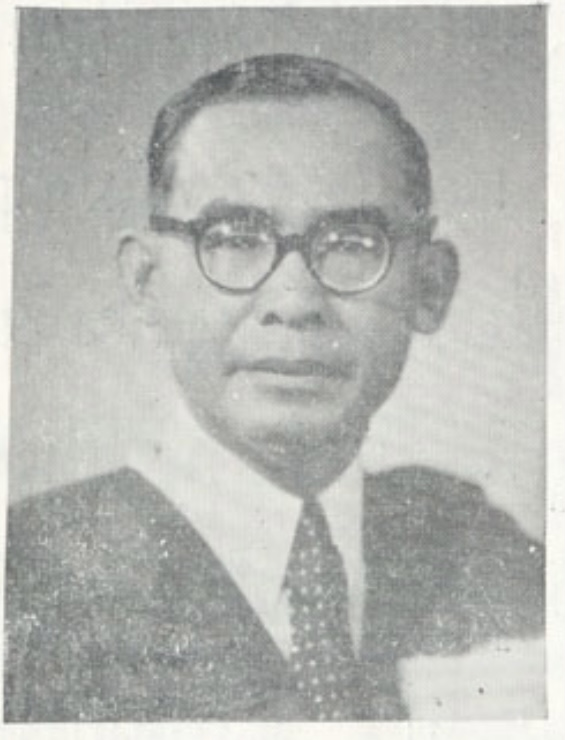

Deputy Prime Minister of Thailand
- In office 24 August 1946 – 6 February 1947
- Prime Minister: Thawan Thamrongnawasawat

Minister of Foreign Affairs
- In office 24 March 1946 – 6 February 1947
- Prime Minister: Pridi Banomyong; Thawan Thamrongnawasawat
- Preceded by: Seni Pramoj
- Succeeded by: Thawan Thamrongnawasawat
- In office 20 October 1943 – 31 August 1944
- Prime Minister: Plaek Phibunsongkhram; Khuang Aphaiwong
- Preceded by: Luang Wichitwathakan
- Succeeded by: Srisena Sampatisiri
- In office 22 August 1941 – 14 December 1941
- Prime Minister: Plaek Phibunsongkhram
- Preceded by: Plaek Phibunsongkhram
- Succeeded by: Plaek Phibunsongkhram

Minister of Finance
- In office 1 September 1945 – 23 March 1946
- Prime Minister: Thawi Bunyaket; Seni Pramoj; Khuang Aphaiwong
- Preceded by: Leng Srisomwong
- Succeeded by: Phraya Srivisaravaja

Minister of Justice
- In office 1 September 1945 – 18 September 1945
- Prime Minister: Thawi Bunyaket
- Preceded by: Chao Phraya Sridharmadhibes
- Succeeded by: Phraya Nararajwasuwat

Personal details
- Born: 18 January 1905 Phitsanulok, Siam
- Died: 1 May 1967 (aged 62) Bangkok, Thailand
- Party: Khana Ratsadon
- Other political affiliations: Free Thai Movement
- Spouse: Pui Jayanama
- Education: Thammasat University
- Profession: Diplomat; politician

Direck Jayanama (Thai: ดิเรก ชัยนาม, RTGS: Direck Chaiyanam; January 18, 1905 – May 1, 1967) was a Thai diplomat and politician.

He was one of the civilian Promoters of the Siamese Revolution of 1932 that changed the country's form of government from absolute to constitutional monarchy. He was closely associated with Pridi Banomyong. In the government of Field Marshal Plaek Phibunsongkhram he served as Minister of Foreign Affairs, but resigned when Phibunsongkhram led Thailand into World War II alongside Japan. Direck became a member of the Free Thai Movement (Seri Thai) alongside Pridi, who fought for the full sovereignty of Thailand and against collaboration with Japan. After the end of war, he served as Minister of Justice, Finance, Foreign Affairs and Deputy Prime Minister in several short-lived cabinets. From 1949 to 1952 he was the first dean of the Faculty of Political Science, Thammasat University.

== Political career ==
From 1938 to 1947, Direck served in many important posts in the Thai government during the early years of constitutional rule. During World War II, he held the post of Foreign Minister to become the Ambassador to Japan. He also held the posts of Deputy Prime Minister, Foreign Minister (multiple times), Justice Minister, and Finance Minister. He also served as the Thai ambassador to the Court of St. James's (England), Germany and Finland.

In 1947, he was appointed ambassador in London, but resigned a few months later as a result of the Phibunite coup.

Direck's memoir Thailand and World War II was first published in 1966. Direck's account is "especially good on the Franco-Thai conflict of 1940, the invasion by Japan in 1941, the delicate relationship with Japan over 1942–1943, financial affairs in the immediate postwar period, and the negotiations to rehabilitate Thailand with the Allied Powers, including becoming a member of the United Nations".

== Thammasat University ==
In 1949, Direck also founded the Thammasat University Faculty of Political Science. It offers undergraduate and graduate studies in three majors, politics and government, public administration, and international affairs. Many Thai provincial governors, mayors, leaders, and activists are graduates from this faculty. He then taught law at Thammasat University, and wrote texts on diplomacy and foreign affairs.

== Family ==
Direck's younger brother was Pairote Jayanama, former Permanent Secretary of Foreign Affairs (who had 4 sons who eventually became ambassadors include Asda Jayanama, Surapong Jayanama), and Am Jayanama, an Air Force General at the time.

He was married to Khunying ML Pui, member of the aristocratic Nopawongse royal bloodline, and had 4 sons with her. One son, Wattana Jayanama, became an important figure during the establishment phase of the Bank of Thailand.

== Honours ==
=== National honours ===
- Knight Grand Cordon of the Most Exalted Order of the White Elephant
- Knight Grand Cordon of the Most Noble Order of the Crown of Thailand
- Knight Grand Commander of the Most Illustrious Order of Chula Chom Klao
- Dushdi Mala Medal Pin of Arts and Science (Civilian)
- Medal for Service Rendered in the Interior (Franco-Thai War)
- King Rama VIII Royal Cypher Medal, 1st Class

=== Foreign honours ===
- Nazi Germany :
  - Order of the German Eagle with Star
- France :
  - Grand Officer of the Legion of Honour
- Japan :
  - Grand Cordon of the Order of the Rising Sun
- USA :
  - Medal of Freedom with Silver Palm
- Germany
  - Order of Merit of the Federal Republic of Germany, Grand Cross 1st Class, Special Issue

Political offices
First	Deputy Minister of Foreign Affairs; 1939–1941	Succeeded by Luang Wichitwathakan
Preceded by Luang Phibunsongkhram	Minister of Foreign Affairs; 1941	Succeeded by Luang Phibunsongkhram
Preceded by Luang Wichitwathakan	Deputy Minister of Foreign Affairs; 1941–1942 with Luang Wichitwathakan	Succeeded by Luang Wichitwathakan
Preceded by Wichit Wichitwathakan	Minister of Foreign Affairs; 1943–1944	Succeeded by Srisena Sombatsiri
Preceded by Chit Na Songkhla	Minister of Justice; 1945	Succeeded by Thongdi Nonlaratchasuwat
Preceded by Leng Srisomwongse	Minister of Finance; 1945–1946	Succeeded by Phraya Sriwisanwacha
Preceded by Seni Pramoj	Minister of Foreign Affairs; 1946–1947	Succeeded by Thawan Thamrongnawasawat
Vacant Title last held by Adul Aduldejjarus	Deputy Prime Minister of Siam; 1946–1947	Succeeded by Duean Bunnag
Assembly seats
New constituency	Members of the House of Representatives for Phra Nakhon, 6th District; 1946–1947	Succeeded by Arun Phanfak
Government offices
Preceded by Luang Thamrongnawasawat	Secretary to the Cabinet; 1933–1940	Succeeded by Thawi Bunyaket
Diplomatic posts
Preceded by Phraya Srisena	Ambassador of Thailand to the Empire of Japan; 1942–1943	Succeeded by Wichit Wichitwathakan
Preceded by Prince Nakkhatra Mangala Kitiyakara	Ambassador of Siam to the United Kingdom; 1947–1948	Succeeded by Prince Nakkhatra Mangala Kitiyakara
Preceded by Luang Chamnannitikasetra	Ambassador of Thailand to West Germany; 1959–1965	Succeeded by Konthi Suphamongkhon
Educational offices
First	Dean of the Faculty of Political Science, Thammasat University; 1949–1952	Succeeded by Malai Huwanan
