= South East Asia League =

International alliance

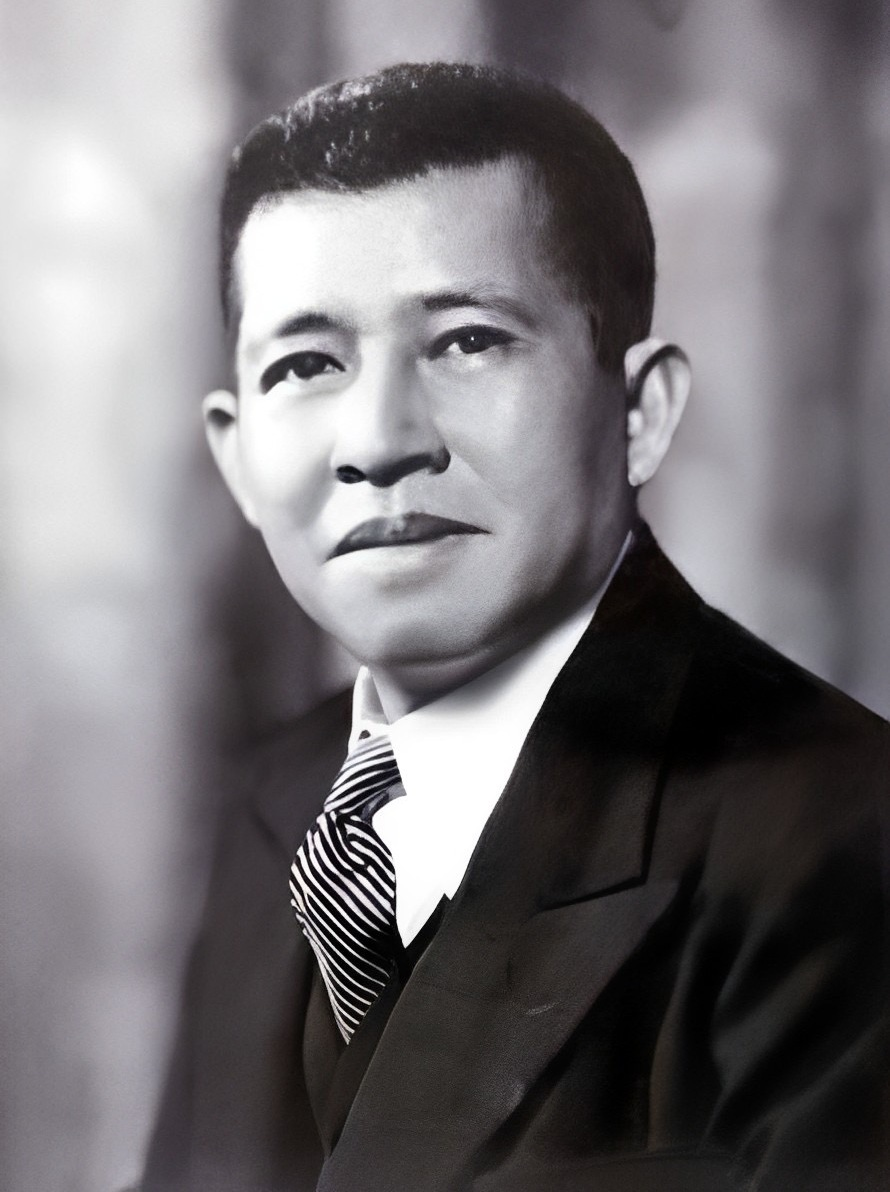
Pridi Banomyong, held ambitions for a federal Southeast Asia

The South East Asia League (SEAL) was a short-lived regional alliance formed in the immediate post-World War II period (1947) amid the surging tide of anti-colonial nationalism in Southeast Asia. It represented as the earliest attempt at Southeast Asian regional cooperation, predating organizations like the Association of Southeast Asia (ASA, 1961) and ASEAN (1967) by two decades. At its height, the alliance held representatives from all of Southeast Asia. Following the achievements of the Free Thai Movement, the founders of the South East Asia League (SEAL) under the Pridi group envisioned a united front of Southeast Asian peoples aimed at securing independence from colonial rule and creating regional unity and stability, with Thailand as a model. The end goal of the alliance was the creation of a federation of Southeast Asian nations.

== Formation ==
The impetus for SEAL's formation grew out of the spirit of Asian solidarity in the aftermath of WWII. Earlier in 1947 (23 March – 2 April), the Asian Relations Conference in New Delhi had brought together many Asian leaders, and Southeast Asians in attendance (such as Burma's Aung San) discussed forming a "South-East Asian Association" to pursue a shared destiny. Following up on these ideas, Thai statesman Pridi Banomyong took the initiative to convene a regional league. In July 1947, the Thai government pointedly refused to join a French-proposed "Pan-Asian Union" under colonial auspices. This was in the aftermath of negotiation results of the Franco-Siamese Conciliation Commission determined that a "Joint-Pan Asian Union" would quell nationalist uprisings in Indochina in Pridi would declare that Thailand would only cooperate if France granted Cambodia and Laos immediate independence. Rejecting French notion and a return to colonialism, Pridi would charter the creation of the South East Asia League as an alternative to Western-led regional plans. The Central Intelligence Agency believed that the alliance held the opportunity to aid his own effort to get the neighboring territory of Cambodia out of French control.

=== Constitution ===
Constitution of South East Asia League

On 1 September 1947, the committee in Bangkok announced a six-point platform and continued working on preparations for the League's formation. Reported by the Singapore Free Press, the committee was strung up with 6 core objectives;

1. The promotion or understanding among peoples of South-East Asia.
2. Upholding ot the freedom and self-determination of South-East Asia peoples.
3. Promotion of respect for human rights.
4. Promotion of universal peace.
5. Promotion of study, research and exchange of information regarding South-East Asia.
6. Establishment of a South-East Asia Union.

By 8 September 1947, a group of 60 residents claiming to represent the people of Thailand, Vietnam, Cambodia, Laos, Indonesia and Malaya held the first SEAL meeting at Ratanakosin Hotel in Bangkok. Bangkok was chosen as the venue and de facto headquarters, as the Thai government (under Pridi's influence) was then sympathetic to regional anti-colonial causes stemming from resistance within the Free Thai Movement. At the founding conference, the delegates unanimously adopted a constitution for the South East Asia League. the League proclaimed its aim to secure "freedom, independence, stability and prosperity" for the peoples of Southeast Asia. A radical key objective enshrined in the constitution was the eventual establishment of a "Federation of Southeast Asia." According to a United States military attaché, Vietnamese government representative Dr. Nguyen Duc Quon stated that there had been considerable discussion regarding the desirability of establishing a federation of Southeast Asian countries. Dr. Quon expressed the view that Thailand, and particularly for Pridi Banomyong, would be the natural leader of such a league. According to a CIA assessment, Pridi held ambition in the potential in organizing the foundations of a Southeast Asian federation. The report suggested that, Bangkok might have become an important center for this initiative had he not been removed from office in November.

The organization operated via a committee structure. A Central Executive Committee and a Permanent Committee were instituted, with offices like president, vice-president, treasurer, etc., as indicated by the constitution. Day-to-day leadership in Bangkok fell to a group of Thai academics and activists close to Pridi. Sukich Nimmanheminda (or Nimmanhemin), a respected professor and administrator, was involved in drafting the SEAL constitution. Thai ministers from the civilian government also joined SEAL's executive council. The Democratic Republic of Vietnam (DRV), though embroiled in war with France, dispatched representatives or maintained contacts in Bangkok to participate in SEAL. Vietnamese communist cadres played a central role in the creation of SEAL. So much so, some scholars denote SEAL as "Viet Minh sponsored." Prince Souphanouvong, as Foreign Minister of the Lao Issara exile government, residing in Bangkok and was deeply involved in regional networking. His name appears as one of the delegates involved in the creation of SEAL.

=== Members ===
At its height in 1948, the alliance held representatives from every part of then Southeast Asia. Country members were then represented by guerillas, nationalist organizations, independence movements, established government representatives, and exiled-governments. There are;

| Name | Representing | Description |
|---|---|---|
| Nai Manoj Vudhaditya | (Thailand) Siam | Former Siamese observer at the Asian Relations Conference at New Delhi; |
| Snoh Tanbunyuen | (Thailand) Siam | Free Thai Movement resistance leader, Thai academic and broadcaster. Studied mathematics at Trinity College, Cambridge, later taught at Chulalongkorn University active within the Siam Society, and worked for the BBC Thai Service. |
| U Hla Pe | (Post-independence Burma (1948–1962)) Burma | Chairman of the Burmese Local Organization. |
| Lê Hi | (Vietnam) Viet Minh | Viet Minh cadre active in Bangkok in 1947; Director of the Viet-Nam News Service. CIA reporting and Thai scholarship mention him as a treasurer/executive-committee member of the Thai-based group and associate of Trần Văn Giàu. |
| Prince Souphanouvong | Laos (Lao Issara) | Later the first President of the Lao PDR; here he appears as the League's general secretary in Bangkok, 1947. |
| Ta Ta Rajatipvongse | Khmer (Khmer Issarak) | Deputy Prime Minister of the Free Cambodia Government. |
| S. Bhohsat | Khmer (Khmer Issarak) | |
| Aswis marmo | Indonesia | Chairman of the Indonesian Local Organization. |
| M. H. Noeh | (Malayan Union) Malaya | Chairman of the Malay Local Organization. |

Other members within the SEAL committee includes:

- Tiang Sirikhanth, Thai Member of Parliament, former Deputy Minister of Interior, and resistance leader within the Free Thai Movement.
- Trần Văn Giàu, who was then a Viet Minh cadre acting as delegation for Bangkok.
- Sukich Nimmanheminda, who was then a professor at Chulalongkorn University.
- Thawin Udol, Deputy Minister of Commerce and resistance member of the Free Thai Movement.
- Trần Văn Luân, Representation of the Democratic Republic of Vietnam, alleged propaganda and intelligence operative, observer at the Asian Relations Conference at New Delhi;
- Prince Norodom Chantaraingsey, member of the Cambodian royal family (the Norodom line) and Issarak resistance member.
- Prince Souvanna Phouma, member of the Laotian royal family and Issara resistance member.
- Dusit Boontharm, Thai Member of Parliament.

Whilst the Burmese and Filipino delegation were also invited.

== Decline ==
The single most damaging blow came when Thailand's political winds shifted. On 8 November 1947, the Thai military (led by generals Phin Choonhavan, Kat Katsongkhram, and supported by returned strongman Plaek Phibunsongkhram) carried out a coup d'état, toppling the Pridi/Thamrong civilian government. This coup was, in part, motivated by alarm at the outgoing government's left-leaning policies, including its patronage of SEAL. The army accused Pridi's faction of harboring "socialist tendencies" and being too tolerant of communists. Notably, Thai military officers "sensed a crisis in [the government's] socialist tendency and believed the opportunity to regain power had arrived". They cited the establishment of the South East Asia League as evidence that the Pridi regime was aligning with communists as part of a "communist conspiracy" and undermining Thailand's stance. Though this was largely refuted by a CIA report as it concludes that it was nationalistic in nature, with the Viet Minh being the only prominent communist element within the grouping.

Following the 1947 coup in Thailand, the new authorities refused to recognize the South-East Asia League (SEAL) or provide institutional support, as its registration under the Thamrong civilian government had not been completed in time. Lacking a government backer or legal standing in Thailand, the League faced difficulties in holding meetings or issuing official statements. A January 1948 report noted that SEAL continued efforts to pursue registration and organizational activities in Bangkok. U Ba Swe, then Secretary General of Burma's Anti-Fascist People's Freedom League, stated that the Burmese government would cooperate with Thai authorities, while Vietnamese representatives and the League's treasurer, Lê Hi, advised exploring relocation options to Rangon.

== See also ==
- History of ASEAN
- Pan-Asianism
- SEATO
- Federal Europe
