= Chamlong Daoruang =

Thai politician (1910–1949)

Chamlong Daoruang (9 October 1910 - 4 October 1949) is former deputy minister of finance under Thawan Thamrongnawasawat. He is Four Tigers of Isaan such as Chamlong Daoruang, Thong-in Phuripat, Tiang Sirikhanth and Thawin Udol.

== Early life ==
Chamlong was born to a family in Maha Sarakham province in the northeast of Thailand. His nicknames among his circle was ai khaek meaning the indian. The name was given to him due to his darker skin which was a result of being outdoors and working in farms.

== Murder ==
A staunch opponent of the Pibulsongkram dictatorship, which had staged a coup against the elected government, Chamlong and four associates were arrested and murdered by the police under orders of Phibun's ruthless ally, Phao Sriyanond. Their buried remains were discovered in Kanchanaburi province many years later.

== Political Work ==
=== Election ===
1. 1937 Siamese general election (Maha Sarakham Province)
2. 1938 Siamese general election (Maha Sarakham Province)
3. 1946 Siamese general election (Maha Sarakham Province)

=== Minister ===
1. Minister under Thawi Bunyaket
2. Minister under Seni Pramoj
3. Minister under Thawan Thamrongnawasawat
4. Minister of Finance under Thawan Thamrongnawasawat

== See also ==
- The Gutsy Politicians Longed for by Many in Isaan.
