= Sukhumvit (disambiguation) =

Sukhumvit (Thai: สุขุมวิท) can refer to:

- Sukhumvit Road, one of the four major highways of Thailand, which follows a coastal route from Bangkok to Trat
- Phra Bisal Sukhumvit, who the road was named after
- Sukhumvit Line of the BTS Skytrain in Bangkok
- Sukhumvit MRT station on the Mass Rapid Transit, Bangkok

== See also ==
- Sukhumi (disambiguation)
