= Khrong Chandawong =

Thai politician

- ครอง จันดาวงศ์
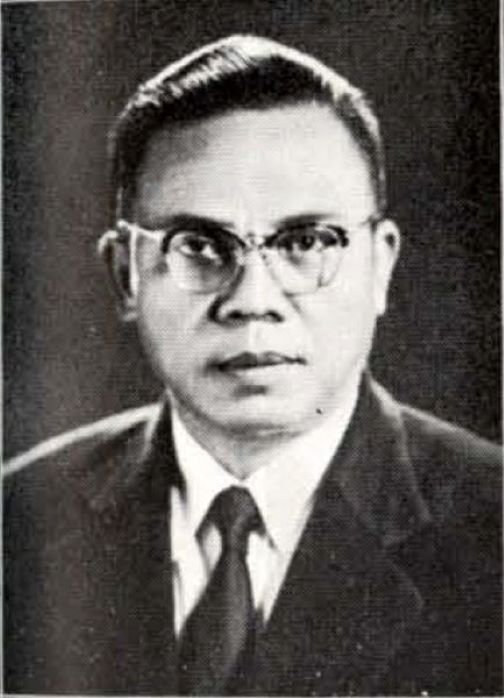
- Khrong Chandawong, photo taken prior to 1959

Member of the Thai House of Representatives
- In office 1957–1958
- Constituency: Sakon Nakhon Province

Personal details
- Born: 28 January 1908 Sakon Nakhon Province
- Died: 31 May 1961 (aged 53) Sawang Daen Din district, Sakon Nakhon Province
- Cause of death: Execution by firing squad
- Profession: Teacher; politician; activist

Khrong Chandawong (Thai: ครอง จันดาวงศ์; 28 January 1908 – 31 May 1961) was a Thai politician and democracy activist who was executed on the orders of dictator Sarit Thanarat. His last words before his execution; “May dictatorship be wrecked. May democracy flourish.” (Thai: เผด็จการจงพินาศ ประชาธิปไตยจงเจริญ), have been repeatedly quoted in various protests and demonstrations for Thailand’s struggling democracy.

== Early life ==
Born to a well-off farming family in Sakon Nakhon Province, Khrong began his career as a teacher in his home region. During World War II, he joined the Free Thai Movement (Seri Thai), an underground anti-Japanese resistance movement.

== Political activities ==
In the post-war era, Khrong's activities attracted the ire of several Thai governments. He was a close friend of Tiang Sirikhanth, who, like Khrong, was a schoolteacher from Sakon Nakhon and former member of Seri Thai, and who was killed in 1952 on orders of the Phibun government. Khrong founded Sammakkhittham ('Solidarity'), a peasant-based group which allegedly attracted thousands of members in northeastern Thailand and was seen as a threat by the central government. Khrong was jailed for five years from 1952 to 1957 on charges of rebellion, before being released as part of a mass amnesty.

After his release, Khrong became a member of parliament for Sakon Nakhon from 1957–1958. He advocated repeal of anti-communist laws, direct election of village headmen, and Isan separatism. On 6 May 1961, Khrong and several dozen others were arrested for alleged communist activities. He was accused of anti-Buddhist and anti-monarchical activities. According to the statement announcing his execution, he had stated that, after a communist revolution in Thailand, the king and monks would be sent to labor in factories.

== Execution and aftermath ==
On 30 May 1961, Prime Minister Sarit Thanarat met with his cabinet and decreed that Khrong and Thongpan Sutthimat were to be executed "to protect national security and the Throne". The pair were summarily executed the next day. After the execution, Khrong's wife and daughter, along with other activists, fled into the mountains of northeastern Thailand; they made contacts with the Pathet Lao and would form the core of the Communist Party of Thailand (CPT). His daughter, under the alias Rassamee, became something of a cult figure in the CPT, while two of his sons became provincial-level figures within the movement. A small monument was erected to Khrong and Thongpan in 2003, but was later moved inside a government compound and then had a road built within a meter of the new location.
