= Phra Bisal Sukhumvit =

Thai politician

Phra Bisal Sukhumvit

Phra Bisal Sukhumvit (Thai: พระพิศาลสุขุมวิท), born Prasob Sukhum (ประสบ สุขุม) was the fifth chief of the Department of Highways in Thailand. Sukhumvit Road, one of Thailand's major highways, is named after him.

== Education ==
He was the son of Chao Phraya Yommaraj (Pun Sukhum), regent to King Rama VIII and Minister of the Interior from 1922 to 1926.

Prasop studied in the United States at Phillips Exeter Academy (class of 1919) and MIT (class of 1923), graduating from Course I with his dissertation titled "A study of traffic at Governor Square, Boston, with suggestions for its regulation". He was the first Thai person to graduate from MIT. While in college, he formed a musical duo with Phisit Arthacinta called the 'Siamese Twins', which according to a review in Brooklyn Life consisted of "some of the more famous Siamese songs, together with interpretations of American ragtime". He was a founder of the American University Alumni Association (AUA) and was later the chairman of the organization for 39 years.

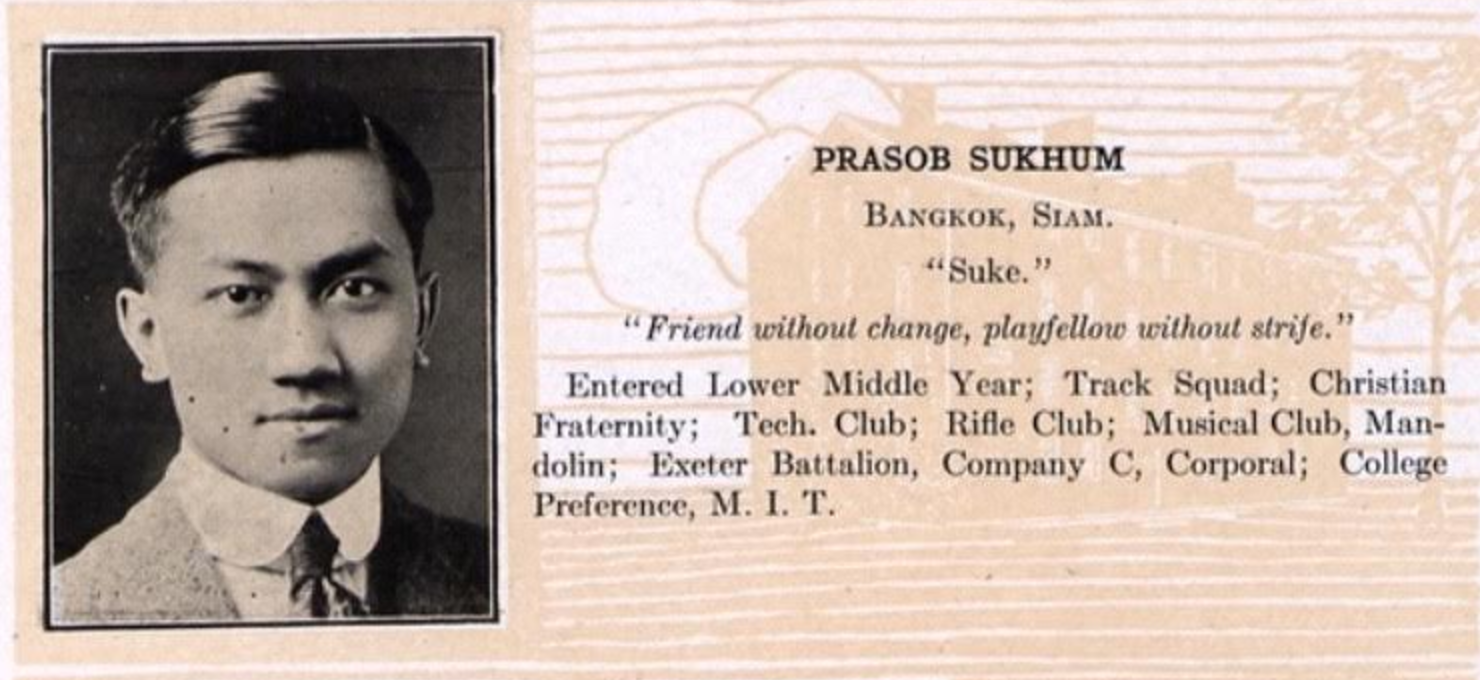
Prasob Sukhum's yearbook entry at Phillips Exeter Academy

== Career ==
Returning to Thailand he became an assistant engineer at the Department of Sanitation and as his career progressed, he was responsible for a rapid increase in Thailand's road infrastructure during the 1930s and 1940s.

He was the Director General of the Royal Irrigation Department from 1942 to 1943.

He was part of the Free Thai Movement and was part of a delegation sent to the United States by Pridi Banomyong at the end of World War II. This delegation aimed to positively influence the United States in assisting Thailand with post-war reconstruction despite Thailand's support for Japan during the war. He addressed the United States House Committee on Foreign Affairs and sought assistance from Abbot Low Moffat who headed the South East Asian Affairs Division of the Department of State which helped improve Thailand–United States relations.
