= Sukhumi (disambiguation) =

Sukhumi is the capital of Abkhazia.

Sukhumi may also refer to:

- SS Sukhumi, a Murmansk Shipping Company steamship

== See also ==
- Sukhumvit (disambiguation)
