= Seni Pramoj =

Prime Minister of Thailand (1945–1946; 1975; 1976)

Mom Rajawongse Seni Pramoj PCh MPCh MVM
- เสนีย์ ปราโมช
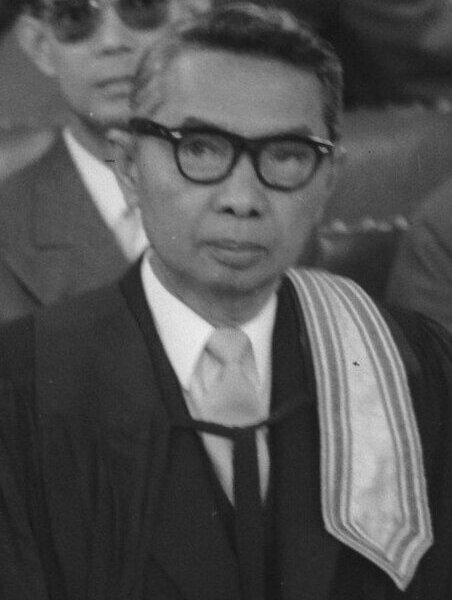
- Seni in 1961

6th Prime Minister of Thailand
- In office 20 April 1976 – 6 October 1976
- Monarch: Bhumibol Adulyadej
- Preceded by: Kukrit Pramoj
- Succeeded by: Sangad Chaloryu (de facto); Thanin Kraivichien
- In office 15 February 1975 – 14 March 1975
- Monarch: Bhumibol Adulyadej
- Preceded by: Sanya Dharmasakti
- Succeeded by: Kukrit Pramoj
- In office 17 September 1945 – 31 January 1946
- Monarch: Ananda Mahidol
- Preceded by: Thawi Bunyaket
- Succeeded by: Khuang Aphaiwong

Minister of Defense
- In office 27 August 1976 – 23 September 1976
- Prime Minister: Himself
- Preceded by: Tawich Seneewong
- Succeeded by: Sangad Chaloryu

Minister of Interior
- In office 20 April 1976 – 6 October 1976
- Prime Minister: himself
- Preceded by: Kukrit Pramoj
- Succeeded by: Samak Sundaravej

Leader of the Opposition
- In office 22 March 1975 – 12 January 1976
- Prime Minister: Kukrit Pramoj
- Preceded by: Thawit Klinprathum
- Succeeded by: Boonteng Thongsawat
- In office 12 February 1969 – 17 November 1971
- Prime Minister: Thanom Kittikachorn
- Preceded by: Khuang Aphaiwong
- Succeeded by: Thawit Klinprathum

Minister of Justice
- In office 24 November 1947 – 21 February 1948
- Prime Minister: Khuang Aphaiwong
- Preceded by: Thawan Thamrongnawasawat
- Succeeded by: Phraya Attargarinipon

Leader of the Democrat Party
- In office 1968–1979
- Preceded by: Khuang Aphaiwong
- Succeeded by: Thanat Khoman

Personal details
- Born: Seni (Note: At that time, Thais did not have surnames.); 26 May 1905 Nakhon Sawan, Nakhon Sawan, Siam (now Mueang Nakhon Sawan, Nakhon Sawan, Thailand)
- Died: 28 July 1997 (aged 92) Bangkok Hospital, Huai Khwang, Bangkok, Thailand
- Party: Democrat
- Other political affiliations: Free Thai Movement
- Spouse: Utsana Saligupta
- Children: Seri Pramoj; Usni Pramoj; Neeyana Pramoj
- Education: Worcester College, Oxford
- Profession: Lawyer; politician; diplomat

Mom Rajawongse Seni Pramoj (Thai: หม่อมราชวงศ์เสนีย์ ปราโมช, RTGS: Seni Pramot, IPA: [sěː.niː praː.môːt]; 26 May 1905 – 28 July 1997) was a Thai professor and politician who served as Prime Minister of Thailand three times. A descendant of the Thai royal family, he was the great-grandson of King Rama II. His final two terms as Prime Minister sandwiched the only term of his brother, Kukrit Pramoj.

== Biography ==
Born a son of Prince Khamrob and mother Daeng (Bunnag), he was educated at Trent College in Derbyshire before obtaining a BA second class honours degree in jurisprudence from Worcester College, Oxford. He continued his studies at Gray's Inn, London, receiving first honours. After returning to Thailand he studied Thai Law, and following six months as a trainee at the Supreme Court, he started to work at the Justice Civil Court. Later, he was transferred to the Foreign Ministry and in 1940 was sent to the United States as Thai ambassador.

=== Free Thai Movement ===
Japanese forces invaded Thailand early on the morning of 8 December 1941, shortly after the attack on the United States at Pearl Harbor, Hawaii. The Prime Minister, Field Marshal Plaek Phibunsongkhram, ordered a ceasefire at noon, entering into an armistice that allowed the Japanese to use Thai military installations in their invasion of Malaya and Burma. On 21 December, a formal military alliance with Japan was concluded.

The Phibun government declared war on Great Britain and the United States on 25 January 1942. Although the Thai ambassador in London delivered Thailand's declaration of war to the British government, Seni refused to do so. Instead, he considered organising a resistance movement in the United States.

Following a late morning interview with Secretary Cordell Hull on 8 December, Seni returned to his legation to confer with his staff. The ambassador and his staff unanimously decided to cast their lot with the Allies. Later that afternoon, he returned to the State Department to offer their services to the Allied cause. Blaming pro-Japanese elements for the early Thai surrender, he spoke to Hull of unfreezing Thai assets in the United States for further prosecution of the war and suggested that the Thais in the country might "organise and preserve a government of true patriotic, liberty-loving Thais while his government is in the clutches of Japan."

The State Department decided to act as if Seni continued to represent Thailand. This enabled him to tap into the frozen Thai assets. When asked to draw up a list of "reliable and influential Thai nationals known to be definitely patriotic and anti-Japanese" by the State Department (at the suggestion of John P. Davies), Seni named Regent Pridi Phanomyong, politicians Khuang Aphaiwong and Wilat Osathanon, and diplomats Phraya Sisena and Direk Jayanama as "reliables".

Seni advanced plans to mobilise Thai volunteers in support of the Allies. Beyond the legation staffers and their families, most other Thai residents were students enrolled at colleges and universities, including institutions such as Harvard, the Massachusetts Institute of Technology, and Cornell. Many chose to stay following the Thai declaration of war in January, refusing repatriation. Most, like Seni, saw their nation as a victim of Japanese aggression.

=== Post-war years ===
Seni became prime minister on 17 September 1945, the day he returned to Bangkok. However, he found his position as the head of a cabinet packed with Pridi's loyalists quite uncomfortable. Northeastern populist politicians like Tiang Sirikhanth and Bangkok newcomers like Sanguan Tularak were not people the aristocratic Seni preferred to associate with. They, in turn, viewed Seni as an elitist who was entirely out of touch with Thailand's political realities. Pridi continued to wield power behind the scenes as he had done during the Khuang government. The regent's looming presence and overarching authority rankled the proud, thin-skinned Seni, fuelling a personal animosity that would poison Thailand’s postwar politics.

The Pramoj brothers subsequently joined the newly formed Democrat Party in 1946, which was for the most part made up of royalists and conservative reactionaries. Seni would spend the next two years vigorously carrying out a personal campaign against Pridi. Earlier in the year he had called for an investigation of the use of the US$500,000 in Thai assets unfrozen by the US government that he had turned over to the OSS. Insinuating the money had been transferred to the senior statesman, he lamented that "most of the money had not been spent for what it was intended." An independent investigatory panel, however, found no mistake, concluding that the Free Thai had "performed remarkably well" and that the Thai people "owe a great deal to them." The outcome left the ex-prime minister looking extremely foolish.

Seni soon got his revenge, however. In the immediate aftermath of King Ananda Mahidol's death, Seni and his party launched relentless attacks against the government and accused Pridi of being responsible for the king's assassination, the implausibility of the charge notwithstanding.

In November 1947 the Democrat Party cooperated with disgruntled army officers to oust the government of Thawan Thamrongnawasawat. As part of the deal, Seni was awarded a cabinet portfolio in Khuang's coup-installed cabinet.

On Tuesday, 14 June 1949, in a lecture delivered before the Siam Society, Seni pleaded, "[I] happen to belong to that peculiar species known as politicians who are in the incorrigible habit of attempting to accomplish the impossible." Word had gotten around that he and his brother had been "getting up a little English translation of some of King Mongkut's public papers and private correspondence...without actually putting it to a final execution." He chooses to speak of the king in his capacity as a legislator, "because legislation is the field I am more closely familiar with than any other." Seni provides, "ample evidence to show that the King was the first and foremost democrat of our country," and quotes from an Act declaring an election whereby "any person, even though he be a slave, who is believed to be so sufficiently possessed of wisdom and restraint as to be able to give clear and satisfactory judgment in accordance with truth, justice and the law may be elected as judge." With regard to the 1944 semi-fictionalized biographical novel Anna and the King of Siam and the 1946 Hollywood film of the same title, Seni quoted several acts and judicial decisions that gave the lie to the fiction.

=== The 1970s and later life ===
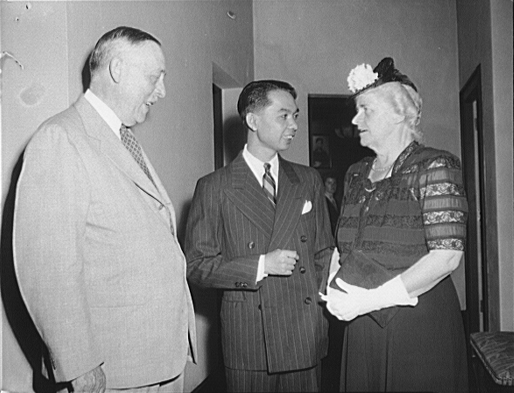
Seni Pramoj with Dr. Eldon R. James, Foreign Affairs Advisor to the Advisor to the Thailand government

Seni returned to his job as a lawyer, but remained active in the Democrat Party during the period of military rule. He served again briefly as prime minister from 15 February to 13 March 1975, when he was defeated and replaced by his younger brother, Rajawongse Kukrit Pramoj. However, Kukrit's government only lasted until 20 April 1976, when Seni regained the top political office.

Seni's final term was a time of crisis in the nation. After a right-wing backlash against leftist student demonstrators culminated in the Thammasat University massacre on 6 October 1976, the military forced him out of office and installed hard-line royalist Thanin Kraivichien as premier.

Seni decided to resign as the leader of the Democrat Party and left politics permanently. He worked as a lawyer until his retirement.

Pramoj died on 26 July 1997 of heart disease and kidney failure from Bangkok Hospital at the age of 92.

== Honours ==
=== Academic rank ===
- Professor of Thammasat University
- Professor of Chulalongkorn University

== Notes ==
Seni Pramoj House of Pramoj Cadet branch of the House of Chakri Born: 26 May 1905 Died: 28 July 1997
Political offices
Preceded by Thawi Bunyaket	Prime Minister of Siam; 1945–1946	Succeeded by Khuang Aphaiwong
Preceded by Thawi Bunyaket	Minister of Foreign Affairs; 1945–1946	Succeeded by Direk Jayanama
Preceded by Thawan Thamrongnawasawat	Minister of Justice; 1947–1948	Succeeded by Phraya Atthakariniphon
Preceded by Phraya Saraphaiphiphat	Minister of Education; 1948	Succeeded by Mangkorn Phromyothi
Preceded by Sanya Dharmasakti	Prime Minister of Thailand; 1975	Succeeded by Kukrit Pramoj
Preceded by Kukrit Pramoj	Prime Minister of Thailand; 1976	Vacant Sangad Chaloryu (acting) Title next held by Thanin Kraivichien
Preceded by Kukrit Pramoj	Minister of Interior; 1976	Succeeded by Samak Sundaravej
Preceded by Tawich Seniwongse na Ayudhya	Minister of Defence; 1976	Succeeded by Sangad Chaloryu
Assembly seats
Preceded by Chot Kumphan	Members of the House of Representatives for Phra Nakhon, 1st District; 1946–1947 with Chot Kumphan	District eliminated
New constituency	Members of the House of Representatives for Phra Nakhon; 1948–1951 with Khuang Aphaiwong; Kukrit Pramoj; Phisek Phrommayon; Chit Munsilpa Sinadyodharaksa; Plod Plodporapak Phibunphanuwat; Praphat Wanthanasan	Vacant Title next held by Praphat Wanthanasan; Chat Sriyanon; Plod Plodporapak Phibunphanuwat; Chintasen Chaiyakam; Bhethai Amatayakul; Chot Kunakasem
Vacant Title last held by Luang Angkananurak; Khuang Aphaiwong; Chalit Kulkamthon; Chintasen Chaiyakam; Thawin Rawangphai; Sombun Sirithon; Phra Prayutchonlathi; Luang Supachalasai; Luang Srisaliphit; Pao Pienlert Boripanyutakit; Chit Munsilpa Sinadyodharaksa; Chaen Patchusanon; Luang Nora-atbancha; Lek Nana; Sawas Sumalyasak; Natthawut Sutthisongkram; Kasem Bunsri; Kamol Chanthornsorn; Luang Prakobnitisarn	Members of the House of Representatives for Phra Nakhon; 1969–1971 with Lek Nana; Kasem Bunsri; Sombun Sirithon; Thammanoon Thien-ngern; Pracha Buranathanit; Sira Patthamakom; Sanah Raktham; Bhichai Rattakul; Surat Osathanugrah; Sawas Sumalyasak; Damrong Latthaphiphat; Phan Premmani; Natthawut Sutthisongkram; Busarin Phakdikul	Province eliminated
New constituency	Members of the House of Representatives for Bangkok, 6th District; 1975–1976 with Samak Sundaravej; Phiphob Asitirat	Succeeded by Nitipat Chaleejan; Thong Thanakan; Watchari Uthaichaloem
First	Leader of the Opposition; 1975–1976	Vacant Boonchu Rojanastien (acting) Title next held by Pramarn Adireksarn
Preceded by Singto Jangtrakul; Wichit Wisetsuwannaphum; Charoen Khanthawong	Members of the House of Representatives for Bangkok, 5th District; 1976 with Phiphob Asitirat; Kamol Somwichien	Vacant Title next held by Sumit Sundaravej; Phiphob Asitirat; Yenchit Rabibadhana na Ayudhya
Party political offices
First	Head of the Free Thai Movement in the United States; 1941–1945	Abolished position
Vacant Title last held by Khuang Aphaiwong	Leader of the Democrat Party; 1968–1979	Succeeded by Thanat Khoman
Diplomatic posts
Preceded by Phraya Abhibal Rajamaitri	Ambassador of Thailand to the United States; 1940–1942	Succeeded by Prince Varna Vaidayakara
Academic offices
Preceded by Phraya Saraphaiphiphat	President of the Chulalongkorn University Council; 1948	Succeeded by Mangkorn Phromyothi
Preceded by Phraya Saraphaiphiphat	President of the Thammasat University Council; 1948	Succeeded by Mangkorn Phromyothi
