= Free Thai Movement =

Thai resistance movement against Imperial Japan

- เสรีไทย
- Free Thai shoulder patch
- Leaders: Various such as Pridi Banomyong in Thailand; Seni Pramoj in USA; Rambai Barni in UK
- Dates active: 1941–1945
- Groups: Free Thai in Thailand; Free Thai in the United States; Free Thai in the United Kingdom; Free Thai in China
- Ideology: Thai nationalism Anti-imperialism; Anti-fascism; Civic nationalism Factions: Socialism; Social liberalism Monarchism; Classical liberalism
- Political position: Syncretic
- Wars: World War II

The Free Thai Movement (Thai: เสรีไทย, RTGS: Seri Thai, pronounced [sěː.rīː tʰāj]) was a Thai underground resistance movement against the Empire of Japan during the Second World War. The Free Thai Movement were an important source of military intelligence for the Allies in the region.

== Background ==
In the aftermath of the Japanese invasion of Thailand on 7–8 December 1941, the regime of Plaek Phibunsongkhram (Phibun) declared war on the United Kingdom and the United States on 25 January 1942. Seni Pramoj, the Thai ambassador in Washington, refused to deliver the declaration to the United States government.

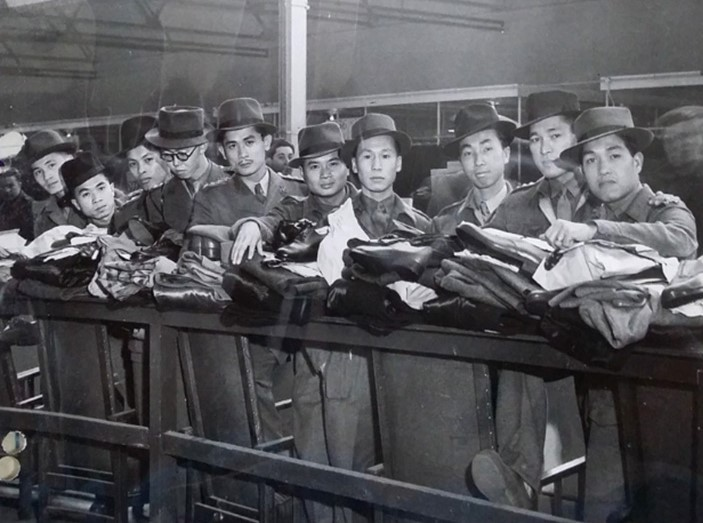
This is a photograph of a group of Thai students training as part of the British Indian Army during the Second World War at the Eastern Warfare School in India, 1944–1945. They were likely part of the Free Thai Movement.

Accordingly, the United States refrained from declaring war on Thailand. Seni, a conservative aristocrat whose anti-Japanese credentials were well established, organized the Free Thai Movement with American assistance, recruiting Thai students in the United States to work with the United States Office of Strategic Services (OSS). The OSS trained Thai personnel for underground activities, and units were readied to infiltrate Thailand. By the end of the war, more than 50,000 Thais had been trained and armed to resist the Japanese by Free Thai members who had been parachuted into the country.

== World War II and Japanese occupation ==
Phibun's alliance with Japan during the early years of war was initially popular. The Royal Thai Army joined Japan's Burma campaign with the goal of recovering their historical claims to part of the Shan states, previously surrendered to the Burmese Empire in the Burmese–Siamese wars and subsequently annexed by the British following the Third Anglo-Burmese War. They gained the return of the four northernmost Malay states lost in the Anglo-Siamese Treaty of 1909, and with Japanese mediation in the Franco–Thai war they also recovered territory lost in the Franco-Siamese crisis of 1893.

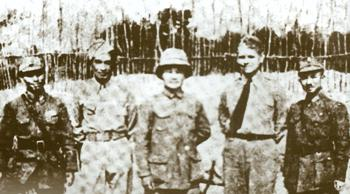
M.L. Karb Kunjara (second from left) with American and Chinese military officers during his Free Thai operations in China.

However, Japan had stationed 150,000 troops on Thai soil, and as the war dragged on, the Japanese increasingly treated Thailand as a conquered country rather than an ally. Although the United States had not officially declared war, on 26 December 1942, US Tenth Air Force bombers based in India launched the first major bombing raid, which damaged targets in Bangkok and elsewhere and caused several thousand casualties. Public opinion, and even more importantly the sympathies of the civilian political elite, moved perceptibly against Phibun's alliance with Japan.

The Free Thai Movement was supported by British Force 136 and the American OSS – both provided valuable intelligence from within Thailand.

=== Pridi and the civilian regime, 1944–1947 ===
In June 1944, Phibun was forced out of office and replaced by the first predominantly civilian government since the 1932 coup. Allied bombing raids continued, and a B-29 raid on Bangkok destroyed the two key power plants on 14 April 1945, leaving the city without power and water. Throughout the bombing campaign, the Seri Thai network was effective in broadcasting weather reports to the Allied air forces and in rescuing downed Allied airmen. The new government was headed by Khuang Aphaiwong, a civilian linked politically with conservatives such as Seni. The most influential figure in the regime, however, was Pridi Banomyong (who was serving as Regent of Thailand), whose anti-Japanese views were increasingly attractive to the Thais. In the last year of the war, Allied agents were tacitly given free access by Bangkok. As the war came to an end, Thailand repudiated its wartime agreements with Japan.

Unfortunately, the civilian leaders were unable to achieve unity. After falling-out with Pridi, Khuang was replaced as prime minister by the Regent's nominee, Seni, who had returned to Thailand from his post as leader of the Free Thai movement in Washington. The scramble for power among factions in late 1945 created political divisions among the civilian leaders that destroyed their potential for making a common stand against the resurgent political force of the Royal Thai Armed Forces in the immediate postwar years.

Postwar accommodations with the Allies also weakened the civilian government. As a result of the contributions made to the Allied war efforts by the Free Thai Movement, the United States, which unlike other Allied countries had never officially been at war with Thailand, refrained from dealing with Thailand as an enemy country in postwar peace negotiations. Before signing a peace treaty, however, the United Kingdom demanded war reparations in the form of rice shipments to Malaya, and France refused to permit admission of Thailand to the United Nations (UN) until the Indochinese areas regained by the Thais during the war were returned to France. The Soviet Union insisted on the repeal of Thailand's anti-communist legislation.

== Heritage ==
Sakon Nakhon historical attractions include a cave well camouflaged by lush vegetation called Tham Seree Thai (ถ้ำเสรีไทย "Seri Thai Cave"), that was used for storage of arms and food during World War II.

== List of famous Free Thai members ==
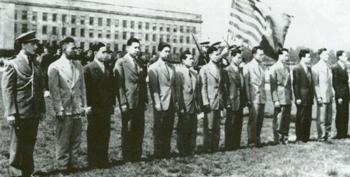
Free Thais who received the Medal of Freedom in 1945. From left to right: Air Chief Marshal Dawee Chullasapya, Major General Boonmark Tesabutr, Commander Vimol Viriyavidh, Piset Pattaphongs, M.C. Yuthisatien Sawadivatana, M.L. Ekachai Kambhu, Anond Srivardhana, Dr. Sala Tsanond, Air Marshal Siddhi Savetsila, Umnuay Poonpipatana, Udomsak Pasavanij, Kusa Punyarchun, Somjit Yos-sunthorn.

- Queen Rambai Barni, widow of King Prajadhipok and nominal head of the Seri Thai in the United Kingdom
- Prince Suphasawatwongsanit Sawatdiwat, Queen Rambai Barni's brother, a former Royal Thai Army officer
- Luang Bannakornkowit, Cabinet Member
- Thawi Bunyaket, Prime Minister of Thailand 1945
- Direk Jayanama, one time Minister of Finance and Foreign Affairs
- Air Marshal Dawee Chullasapya
- Mom Rajawongse Seni Pramoj, Prime Minister of Thailand 1945–46, 1975, 1976
- Pridi Banomyong, Prime Minister of Thailand 1946
- Siddhi Savetsila, later Air Chief Marshal of the Royal Thai Air Force, Foreign Minister of Thailand, Deputy Prime Minister of Thailand, and Privy Councillor to King Bhumibol Adulyadej
- Tiang Sirikhanth, Assemblyman
- Sanguan Tularak, Cabinet Member
- Puey Ungphakorn, London-educated economist who headed the Bank of Thailand and later served as rector of Thammasat University
- Prince Varananda Dhavaj
- Vilas Osthananda
- Phra Bisal Sukhumvit, first Thai MIT graduate, fifth chief of the Department of Highways

== See also ==
- Lao Issara and Khmer Serei, similar movements in Laos and Cambodia, respectively
- Jim Thompson and his activities in World War II
- List of Free Thai Movement groups and networks
