= Pridi Banomyong =

Prime Minister of Thailand in 1946

His Excellency Pridi Banomyong NR PChW MPCh MWM GCMG KmstkVO
- ปรีดี พนมยงค์
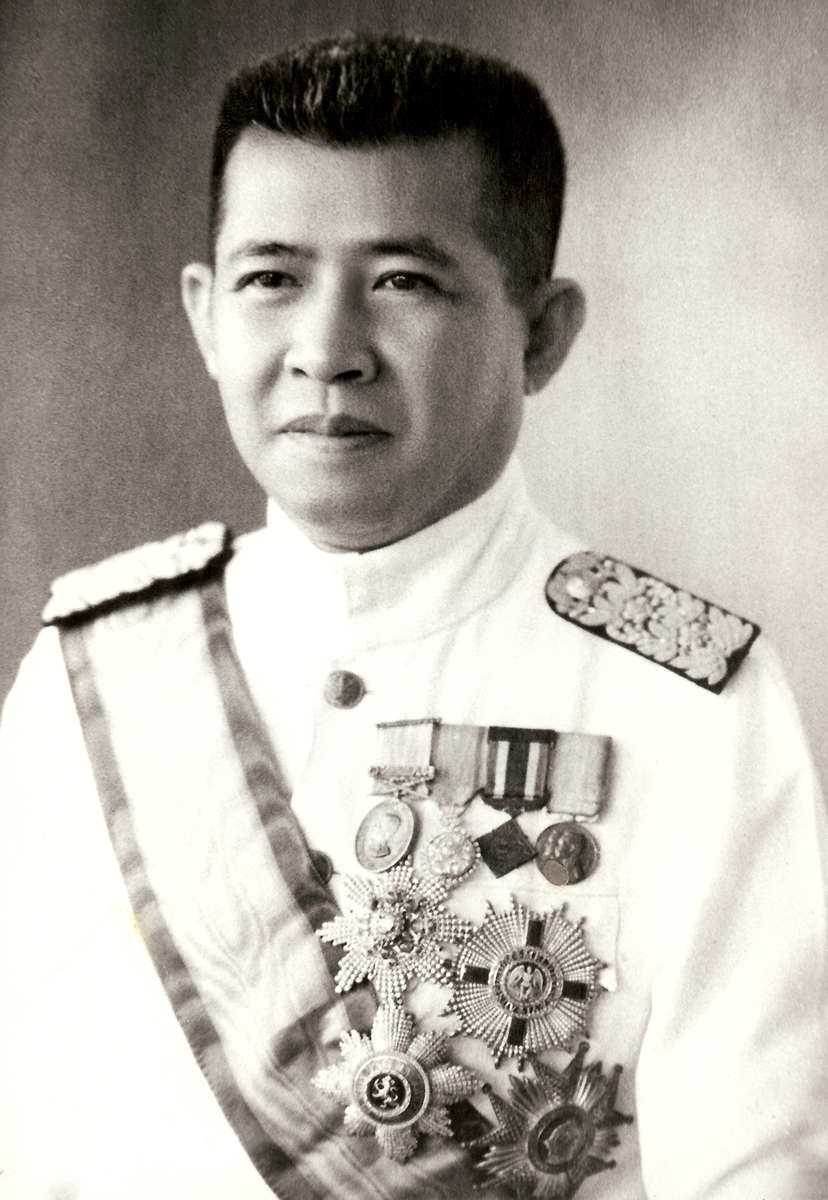
- Pridi in 1946

Regent of Thailand
- In office 16 December 1941 – 5 December 1945
- Monarch: Ananda Mahidol
- Prime Minister: Plaek Phibunsongkhram; Khuang Aphaiwong; Thawi Bunyaket; Seni Pramoj

7th Prime Minister of Thailand
- In office 24 March 1946 – 23 August 1946
- Monarchs: Ananda Mahidol; Bhumibol Adulyadej
- Preceded by: Khuang Aphaiwong
- Succeeded by: Thawan Thamrongnawasawat

Member of the Thai House of Representatives from Phra Nakhon Si Ayutthaya
- In office 24 March 1946 – 23 August 1946
- Prime Minister: Himself
- Preceded by: Additional election
- Succeeded by: Nittayakorn Worawan
Ministerial offices 1934–1946
Minister of Finance
In office 24 March 1946 – 23 August 1946
Prime Minister	Himself
Preceded by	Tianliang Huntrakul
Succeeded by	Wichit Lulitanon
In office 20 December 1938 – 16 December 1941
Prime Minister	Plaek Phibunsongkhram
Preceded by	Soem Kritsanamara
Succeeded by	Pao Pienlert Boripanyutakit
Minister of Foreign Affairs
In office 12 July 1936 – 13 December 1938
Prime Minister	Phraya Phahon
Preceded by	Sisena Sombatsiri
Succeeded by	Chit na Songkhla
Minister of Interior
In office 29 March 1934 – 12 February 1935
Prime Minister	Phraya Phahon
Preceded by	Phraya Phahon
Succeeded by	Thawan Thamrongnawasawat

Personal details
- Born: Pridi (Note: At that time, Thais did not have surnames.); 11 May 1900 Ayutthaya, Krung Kao, Siam
- Died: 2 May 1983 (aged 82) Paris, France
- Party: Khana Ratsadon
- Other political affiliations: Sahachip; Free Thai Movement
- Spouse: Poonsuk Banomyong
- Children: 6
- Education: University of Paris; Thai Royal College of Law

Pridi Banomyong (Thai: ปรีดี พนมยงค์, RTGS: Pridi Phanomyong, pronounced [prīː.dīː pʰā.nōm.jōŋ]; 11 May 1900 – 2 May 1983), also known by his noble title Luang Praditmanutham (Thai: หลวงประดิษฐ์มนูธรรม), was a Thai lawyer, professor, activist, politician, democratic socialist, and senior statesman. He served in multiple ministerial posts, as regent, and as prime minister in Thailand. He led the civilian wing of Khana Ratsadon, and helped found the University of Moral and Political Sciences and the Bank of Thailand.

Born to a family of farmers in Ayutthaya province, he received a good education, becoming one of the nation's youngest barristers in 1919, at the age of nineteen. In 1920, he won a royal scholarship granted by the King of Siam to study in France, where he graduated from the University of Caen with a master's degree, and received a doctorate from the University of Paris in 1927. In the same year, he co-founded Khana Ratsadon with like-minded Siamese overseas royal-sponsored students. After returning to Thailand, still called Siam at the time, he worked as a judge, judicial secretariat, and professor. In the aftermath of 1932 Siamese Revolution, he played an important role in drafting two of the country's first constitutions and proposing a socialist economic plan influenced by communism scheme, principles and conducts. His plan was ill-received, and Pridi went into a short period of political exile as aftermath of the fight-for-power with his fellow revolutionists. On his return, he took many ministerial posts in Khana Ratsadon governments. His contributions include modernizing Thai legal codes, laying the foundation for Thailand's local government system, negotiating the cancellation of unequal treaties with the West, and tax reform.

Pridi diverged from Plaek Phibunsongkhram after the latter began to display a taste for dictatorial governance in the 1930s, marking the beginning of the long rivalry between the two Khana Ratsadon leaders. Pridi was made Regent during 1941 to 1945, a powerless post at the time. Shortly thereafter, he became leader of the domestic Free Thai Movement during World War II. He briefly became prime minister in 1946, but his political opponents painted him as the mastermind behind the mysterious death of King Ananda Mahidol, and a coup in 1947 cost him his political power. An attempt to stage a counter-coup in 1949 failed and Pridi spent the rest of his life living in exile. He died in Paris in 1983, and his ashes were brought back to Thailand three years later.

He is often described as a democratic socialist. The branding of Pridi as a communist and a mastermind of King Ananda's death has since been regarded as politically motivated, which his opponents continued to use even after his death. However, Pridi won every libel lawsuit in Thailand filed against those who promoted such views. He became a symbol of resistance against military dictatorships, Progressive politics, and Thammasat University. The centenary of his birth was celebrated by UNESCO in 2000.

== Ancestry ==
Pridi wrote that his great-great-great-grandfather, Heng, was a native of Etang Village in the Chenghai County of Guangdong Province, southern China, who came to Siam during the reign of Boromaracha V (Ekkathat) (r. 1758–1767), leaving behind his wife, who was pregnant with their son, Seng. Heng lived in Siam among the Chinese relatives of King Taksin, who recruited some of the local Chinese, including Heng, to fight against the Burmese invaders in 1767. Heng died in the service of the half-Chinese king. Taksin compensated Heng's family, after they sent a letter inquiring about him. Seng chose to live his life in China as a rice farmer.

However, Seng's son, Tan Nai Kok (陳盛于/陈盛于; Chen Chengyu; Tan Sêng-u), emigrated to Siam in 1814, during the reign of King Rama II. Nai Kok settled in Ayutthaya and made his living by selling Chinese and Thai sweets; it is said he had made innovations by combining Chinese and Thai culinary skills. A devout Buddhist, Nai Kok married a Thai woman named Pin. Pin's sister, Boonma, would become an ancestor of Pridi's wife Poonsuk. Their son, Nai Koet, married Khum, daughter of a wealthy Chinese entrepreneur. When Nai Koet died, his wife directed that his remains were to be cremated and interred at the shrine at Phanomyong Hill, which is the origin of their Thai surname. Their son, Nai Siang, who became a wealthy rice merchant, married Lukchan; they were the parents of Pridi.

== Early life and education ==
Pridi Phanomyong was born in Tha Wasukri Ayutthaya Province, the second of five children. He had two half-siblings from his father's minor wife. In 1915, following a royal decree issued by King Vajiravudh, Pridi and his family dropped "Nai" from their names. He completed his secondary education at Suankularb Wittayalai School.

After graduating from the Law School of the Siamese Ministry of Justice as a barrister with a Bachelor of Laws degree in 1919, he received a government scholarship to study law and political economy at Sciences Po in Paris. While studying in France, he began assembling a group of fifty civil servants who wanted to turn Thailand's then-absolute monarchy into a constitutional monarchy. He earned a PhD in law and a higher diploma in economics and returned to Siam in 1927 to work for the Ministry of Justice. He quickly rose in rank, and was granted the royal title Luang Praditmanutham (หลวงประดิษฐ์มนูธรรม) in 1928.

== Political career ==
=== People's Party ===
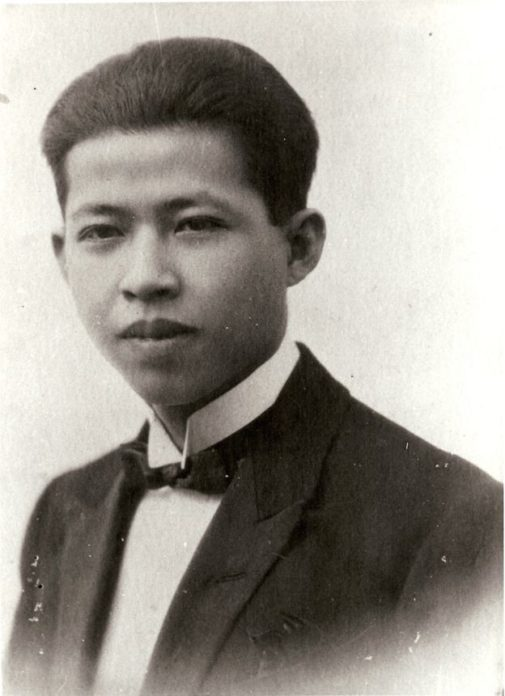
Pridi Banomyong in 1915

On 24 June 1932, Khana Ratsadon, the tiny People's Party, with Pridi as the leader of the civilian faction, carried out a lightning coup that abruptly ended 150 years of absolute monarchy under the Chakri dynasty.

In 1933, Pridi published the Draft National Economic Plan, also known as the "Yellow cover dossier", a radical economic plan calling for the nationalisation of land, public employment, and social security. The plan was rejected by royalists and some ex-members of Khana Ratsadon, who shut down parliament and the judiciary. Pridi was accused of being a communist and went into exile. It is noted, however, that many ideas he proposed finally came into existence, such as the national bank and National Economic Council, and the conservatives only agreed to Pridi in founding national lottery.

=== Khana Ratsadon ministerial posts ===
Pridi returned to Thailand in 1934 to found Thammasat University as an open university, before assuming the posts of Minister of the Interior that year, Minister of Foreign Affairs in 1935, and Minister of Finance in 1938.

As Minister of Foreign Affairs from 1936 to 1937, Pridi signed treaties revoking the extraterritorial rights of 12 countries. With these treaties, Thailand was able to regain independence with regard to legal jurisdiction and taxation for the first time since unequal treaties were signed under duress during the reign of King Rama IV.

Although he had been friends with Field Marshal Plaek Phibunsongkhram during the early days of the People's Party, the two fell out in subsequent years. Pridi was anti-Japanese as well as left-leaning. He opposed many of Phibun's militaristic policies which tended to be more conciliatory toward the Japanese. The antipathy between the two would define how Thailand fared in World War II when Japan was on the march in Asia.

=== Free Thai movement ===
On 8 December 1941, Imperial Japan launched attacks on Southeast Asia and the Allied possessions in the region, opening the Pacific War. This included amphibious landings in Thailand and an invasion across the border from French Indochina. After initially resisting, the Thai government reluctantly agreed to let the Japanese pass through the country and use its military bases to strike other Allied possessions in the region, culminating in the Battle of Malaya.

When Field Marshal Plaek Phibunsongkhram issued a declaration of war against Britain and the United States in January 1942, Pridi refused to sign it, as he served as the Regent for the young monarch, who was studying in Switzerland. In this capacity, Pridi built the anti-Japanese underground, the Free Thai Movement ("Seri Thai") network, in Thailand. Code named "Ruth", he established contact with the Allies and Thai resistance organisations in Britain and the United States. As the war progressed and the fortunes of the Japanese declined, public dissatisfaction grew and Phibun was forced to resign as prime minister in 1944.

Khuang Aphaiwong, a liberal lawyer and member of Seri Thai, was chosen to be prime minister due to "his ability to dissemble with the Japanese" to shield the growing Seri Thai movement while at the same time improving superficial relations with the Japanese occupiers.

When Japan's surrender ended the war, the Seri Thai-dominated government immediately acted to "restore the pre-war status quo". As regent, Pridi termed "the declaration of war illegal and null, and void" as improperly made, and repudiated all agreements made with Japan by Phibun.

When Lord Louis Mountbatten, the Supreme Commander, Southeast Asia, visited Bangkok in late-1945, he recorded a tribute to Pridi in which he said that there had existed a unique situation wherein "the Supreme Allied Commander was exchanging vital military plans with the Head of a State technically at war with us".

=== Post-war years ===
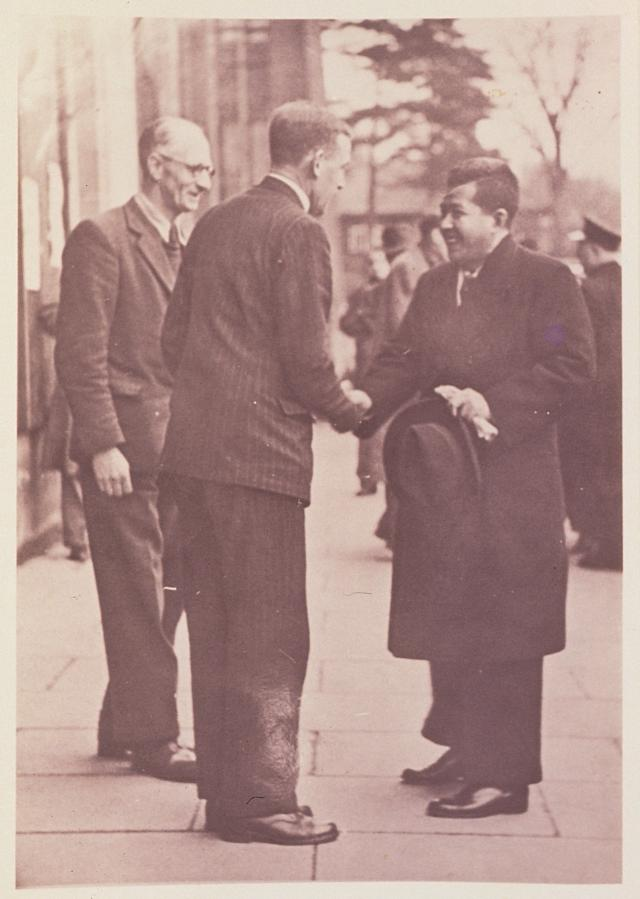
Pridi in London, 1947

Pridi retired from the regency when King Ananda Mahidol returned in December 1945. He was formally named a Senior Statesman (Ratthaburut Awuso), and served as an advisor to the post-war, civilian governments of Thawi Bunyaket and Seni Pramoj.

In March 1946, Khuang Aphaiwong, who had been elected prime minister in January, resigned. Pridi assumed the position in an attempt to stabilize the political situation, which was spiralling out of control. It was during the first months of the Pridi government that the war crimes trial of Phibun was dismissed on a legal technicality. Having noticed that Khuang shifted more and more conservative, Pridi decided to compete for political power himself. After his political allies voted Khuang out in 1946, he became the 8th Prime Minister of the country.

As the Cold War raging, Thailand became a focus of the United States. Pridi, who supported the Vietnamese independence movement of Ho Chi Minh and establishment of anti-imperialist Southeast Asia League, lost the political support from the US, which led to tacit support to the coup against him.

On the morning of 9 June 1946, the young king was found dead in his bed in the Baromphiman Mansion in the Grand Palace, dead from a gunshot wound to his head. In October 1946, a commission ruled that the King's death could not have been accidental, but that neither suicide nor murder was satisfactorily proved. Sulak Sivaraksa, a prominent conservative and monarchist, wrote that Pridi's role in the event was he protected responsible royals, and prevented the arrest of a person who destroyed the evidence. However, when his government cannot solve the case, his political opponents quickly put the blame on him; some went so far as to branding him as the mastermind behind the assassination.

After a general election, Pridi resigned as prime minister, resumed his role of senior statesman, and left on a world tour, visiting Generalissimo Chiang Kai-shek and US president Harry S. Truman along the way.

Pridi's opponents composed of royalist, conservative and military camps. On 8 November 1947, army troops seized various government installations in Bangkok. The coup, led by Lieutenant General Phin Choonhavan and Colonel Kat Katsongkhram, ousted Thamrong's government, which is the political ally of Pridi. He spent a week hiding in Admiral Sindhu Songkhramchai's headquarters. On 20 November, he was spirited to Singapore by British and US agents. The 1947 coup marked the return to power of Phibun, and the end of Khana Ratsadon's role in Thai politics. (At this time, Phibun was often considered in the military camp.)

Phibun arrested King Ananda's secretary, Senator Chaleo Patoomros, and two of his pages under charges of conspiracy to kill the king. Rumours were spread that Pridi was part of a conspiracy involved in the alleged regicide, and that he had plans to turn Thailand into a republic. After a farcical trial, during which the entire defence team resigned and two members of a subsequent team were arrested under charges of treason, the judges sentenced three royal pages, associated with Pridi, to death.

Biographer William Stevenson has said that King Bhumibol Adulyadej did not believe that Pridi was involved in his brother's death.

=== Permanent exile ===
Pridi secretly returned in 1949 in order to stage a coup d'état against Phibun's dictatorship. When it failed, Pridi left for China, never to return to Thailand. In 1970, he travelled to France, where he spent the remainder of his life. Pridi died on 2 May 1983, at his home in the suburbs of Paris.

== Legacy ==
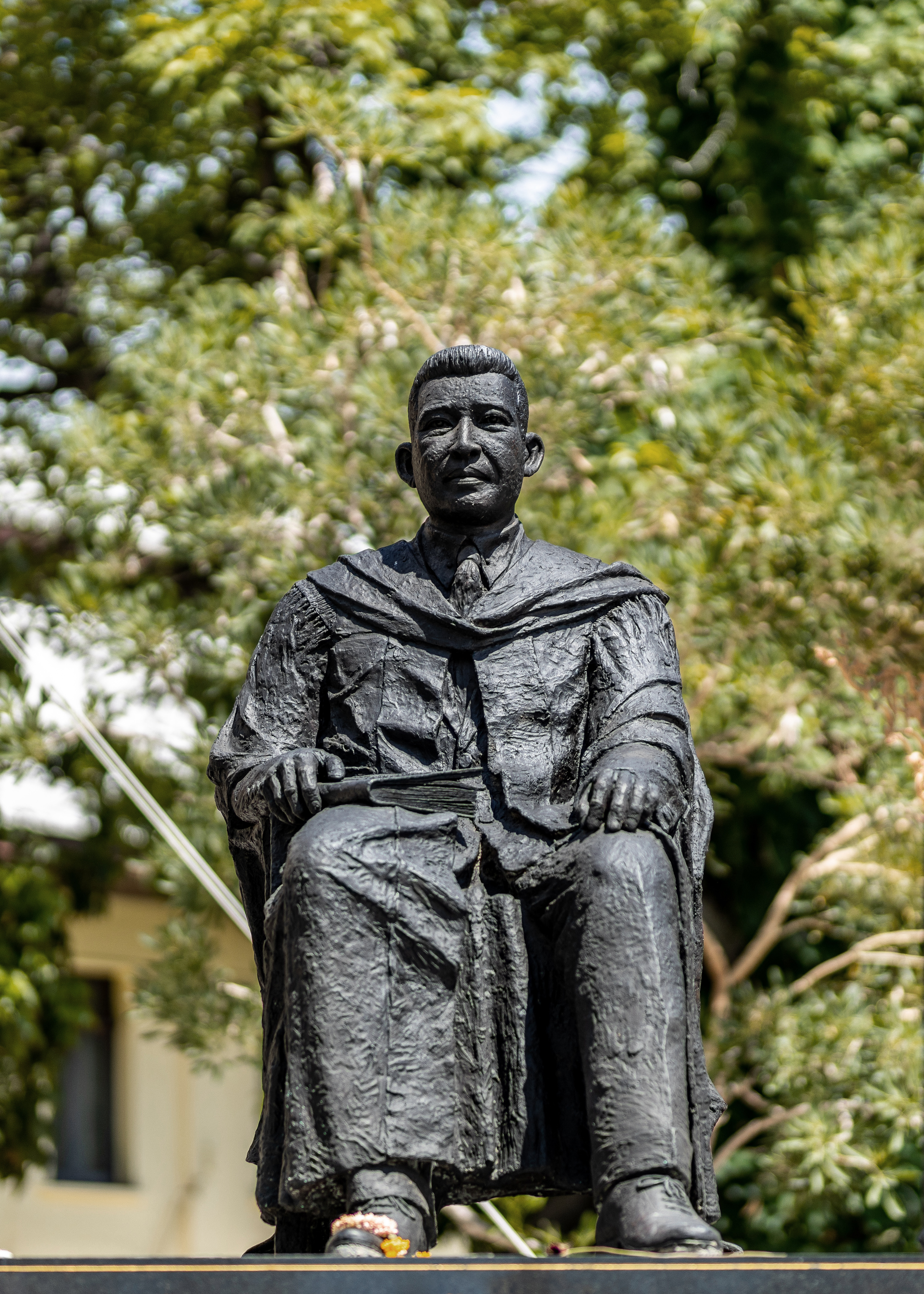
Statue of Pridi at Thammasat University in Tha Phra Chan campus.

Pridi remains a controversial figure in Thai modern history. As one of the leaders of the 1932 pro-democracy coup, he has been viewed in many ways. The first declaration of the "revolution," which harshly attacked the king and his government, was written by Pridi himself. Nevertheless, Pridi held the position of regent when Rama VIII ascended to the throne.

During the period of military rule, Pridi was portrayed as a communist as several of his books and articles showed sympathy for Marxist, socialist, and communist ideologies.

With obvious conflict between Pridi and the King Rama VIII, the young king's tragic death came to be blamed on Pridi. Pridi was accused of being the leader of a plot to assassinate the popular young monarch. This culminated in the military coup in 1947.

In his later years, Seni Pramoj promoted the idea that he had saved Thailand from post-war British colonial rule that Pridi had been willing to accept. Nigel Brailey treats the Free Thai movement as largely a sham and casts doubt on Pridi's part, arguing "it appears questionable whether Pridi committed himself personally to the Allied cause much prior to August 1942, if even then," suggesting that "his eventual anti-Japanese stance was a consequence primarily of his hostility to Phibun."

Pridi wanted to remove Phibun from power, and the war offered an opportunity to do so. However, Pridi recognised well before the war that Thailand's alignment with the Axis powers would work to Phibun's advantage and enable him to strengthen his dictatorship. Even the Japanese recognised Pridi's hostility, which is why he was forced out of the cabinet in December 1941. It was the reason every knowledgeable person on the Allied side, from Seni Pramoj and Prince Suphasawat, a chief organiser of the movement in Great Britain, to former British ambassador Josiah Crosby, anticipated that Pridi would emerge as the head of a domestic resistance movement.

One-time conservative monarchist Sulak Sivaraksa has emerged as one of Pridi's most ardent champions. A prolific critic of the Thai status quo, Sulak, in addition to praising the achievements of the Free Thai in saving Thailand's sovereignty, has criticised Seni and his Democrat Party for alleged complicity in the military's return to power in 1947.

Sulak led efforts to rehabilitate Pridi which achieved significant results. Four Bangkok streets now are named for Pridi: three as Pridi Banomyong Road and one called Praditmanutham (his royally granted title) Road. His birthday, 11 May, is now celebrated as Pridi Banomyong Day. In 1997, the Thai government dedicated a park in eastern Bangkok to the Free Thai resistance movement. On 16 August 2003, a library-museum, built as a replica of Pridi's wartime residence, opened at the park.

On 30 October 1999, UNESCO included the centenary of Pridi Phanomyong's birth in its recognition of anniversaries of great personalities and historic events as tribute to his ideals and integrity.

There are two Pridi Banomyong Memorials, one in Pridi's hometown, the other on the campus of Thammasat University, which he founded. Thammasat is home to the Pridi Banomyong Library and the Pridi Banomyong International College. The law faculty at Dhurakij Pundit University is called the Pridi Banomyong Faculty of Law. The Pridi (Chloropsis aurifrons pridii), a species of leafbird, and Pridi Banomyong Institute, a non-profit academic organisation, are named in his honour. The Pridi Banomyong Institute holds an annual Pridi Banomyong Lecture, initially on Pridi Banomyong Day, but moved in recent years to 24 June, in honour of his role in the 1932 coup.

== Honours and awards ==
=== Academic rank ===
- Professor of Thammasat University

=== Civil Service of Siam rank ===
- Chief of Ministry of Justice of Siam (Thai: อํามาตย์ตรี)

=== Noble titles ===
- Luang Praditmanutham (หลวงประดิษฐ์มนูธรรม): granted 1928, resigned 1941.

=== Royal decorations ===
Pridi received the following royal decorations in the Honours System of Thailand:

- 1945 - Knight of The Ancient and Auspicious Order of the Nine Gems
- 1945 - Knight Grand Cross (First Class) of The Most Illustrious Order of Chula Chom Klao
- 1941 - Knight Grand Cordon (Special Class) of the Most Exalted Order of the White Elephant
- 1937 - Knight Grand Cordon (Special Class) of The Most Noble Order of the Crown of Thailand
- 1933 - Safeguarding the Constitution Medal
- 1939 - Dushdi Mala Medal for Services to the Nation
- 1942 - Medal for Service Rendered in the Interior (Indochina)
- 1938 - King Rama VIII Royal Cypher Medal, 1st Class

=== Foreign decorations ===
- Order of the Rising Sun, 1st Class (Japan)
- Grand Cross of the Order of the German Eagle (Germany), 1938
- Grand Cross of the Légion d'honneur (France)
- Grand Cordon of the Order of Leopold (Belgium)
- Grand Cross of the Order of Saints Maurice and Lazarus (Italy)
- Grand Cross of the Order of St Michael and St George (United Kingdom)
- Medal of Freedom with Gold Palm (United States of America)
- Commander Grand Cross of the Order of Vasa (Sweden)

== Notes ==
Regnal titles
Preceded by Prince Aditya Dibabha; Chaophraya Bijayendra Yodhin	Regent of Siam; 1941–1945 with Prince Aditya Dibabha; Chaophraya Bijayendra Yodhin	Vacant Title next held by Phra Suthammavinijchai; Praya Nonrajasuvaj; Sanguan Juthathemi
Political offices
Preceded by Phraya Phahonphonphayuhasena	Minister of Interior; 1934–1935	Succeeded by Luang Thamrongnawasawat
Preceded by Phraya Sri Sena	Minister of Foreign Affairs; 1936–1938	Succeeded by Chaophraya Sri Thammathibet
Preceded by Phraya Chaiyotsombat	Minister of Finance; 1938–1941	Succeeded by Pao Pienlert Boripanyutakit
Preceded by Khuang Aphaiwong	Prime Minister of Siam; 1946	Succeeded by Thawan Thamrongnawasawat
Preceded by Phraya Sri Wisarawaja	Minister of Finance; 1946	Succeeded by Wichit Lulitanon
Academic offices
First	President of University of Moral and Political Sciences; 1934–1946	Vacant Duan Bunnag (Acting) Title next held by Plaek Phibunsongkhram as President of Thammasat University
