= Tiang Sirikhanth =

Thai politician and resistance leader during World War II (1909–1952)

Tiang Sirikhanth (Thai: เตียง ศิริขันธ์; RTGS: Tiang Sirikan; December 5, 1909 – December 12, 1952) was a Thai politician and a Seri Thai resistance leader during World War II.

== Early life ==
Tiang was born to a merchant family in Sakon Nakhon province in the northeast of Thailand. His name literally means "bed". He graduated in arts from Chulalongkorn University in 1930 and became a secondary school teacher in Bangkok. He then accepted the position of headmaster at a school in his home province. Tiang was elected to the National Assembly in 1940 and would represent his province until his death.

== The Free Thai Movement ==
On the morning of December 8, 1941 Japanese forces invaded Thailand at numerous points along the seacoast and from French Indo-China. The Thai army and air force resisted, but were taking heavy casualties against the veteran Japanese units. Prime Minister Phibun panicked and ordered a cease fire the same day. He allowed the Japanese to occupy Bangkok unopposed and to invade British Malaya from southern Thailand. After Singapore fell to the invaders, Phibun went so far as to make a formal alliance with Japan.

Tiang and others opposed to the Japanese met with the Regent, Pridi Banomyong, on the night of December 8 to discuss forming a resistance movement. This would eventually develop into the "Seri Thai", the Free Thai Movement.

Tiang organised the largest Seri Thai guerrilla training operation near his hometown in Sakorn Nakorn, with military support from British Force 136. His British code name was Pluto.

== Post war and murder ==
Following the war, Tiang served as a cabinet minister in several democratic governments. Along with his friend and political ally Khrong Chandawong, Sirikhanth was one of the most prominent left-wing Thai political leaders in the post-war era, earning the nickname of "General of Phu Phan."

A staunch opponent of the Phibun dictatorship, which had staged a coup against the elected government, Tiang and four associates were arrested and murdered by the police under orders of Phibun's ruthless ally, Phao Siyanon. Their buried remains were discovered in Kanchanaburi province many years later.
