= Thawi Bunyaket =

Prime Minister of Thailand in 1945

Thawi Bunyaket ThChW MPCh DM
- ทวี บุณยเกตุ
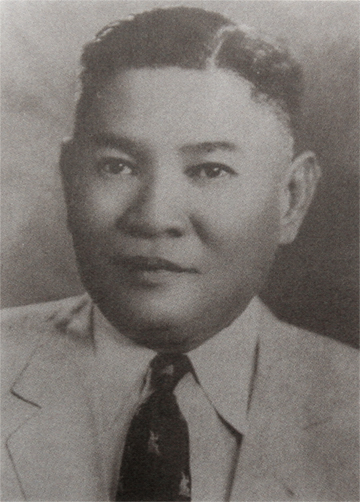
- Thawi in 1940

5th Prime Minister of Thailand
- In office 31 August 1945 – 17 September 1945
- Monarch: Ananda Mahidol
- Preceded by: Khuang Aphaiwong
- Succeeded by: Seni Pramoj

President of the National Assembly of Thailand
- In office 8 May 1968 – 20 June 1968
- Preceded by: Phra Prachonpachanuk
- Succeeded by: Colonel Vorkarnbancha

Minister of Education
- In office 1 August 1944 – 31 August 1945
- Prime Minister: Khuang Aphaiwong
- Preceded by: Sindhu Kamolnavin
- Succeeded by: Tri Trironnasarn

Personal details
- Born: Thawi (Note: At that time, Thais did not have surnames.); 10 November 1904 Trang, Phuket, Siam (now Kantang, Trang, Thailand)
- Died: 3 November 1971 (aged 66) Bangkok, Thailand
- Party: Khana Ratsadon
- Other political affiliations: Free Thai Movement
- Spouse: Amphasri Bunyaket
- Education: King's College; University of Cambridge; École nationale supérieure d'Agronomie de Grignon

Thawi Bunyaket (also spelt Thawee Bunyaget; Thai: ทวี บุณยเกตุ, pronounced [tʰā.wīː būn.jā.kèːt]; 10 November 1904 – 3 November 1971) was a Thai politician and the prime minister of Thailand for a short time from 31 August 1945, following the resignation of Khuang Aphaiwong until his own resignation on 17 September 1945.

== Early life and education ==
After studying at the King's College, University of Cambridge and the École nationale supérieure d'Agronomie de Grignon (France), he started to work as a government official at the Ministry of Agriculture.

== Political careers ==
On 24 June 1932 he joined the coup group of the 1932 coup, the People's Party. He became secretary general in the cabinet of Field Marshal Phibunsongkhram, and Minister of Education in the cabinet of Khuang Aphaiwong. When Khuang resigned directly after the end of World War II, he was elected as prime minister on 31 August 1945 and formed the 12th Thai administration. However he was only chosen because the preferred candidate Seni Pramoj, chief of the Free Thai Movement, was not available. Seventeen days after his election, on 17 September, he resigned to free the post for Seni Pramoj.

Later he became President of the Constitutional Drafting Committee in the government of Field Marshal Sarit Thanarat.

== Honours and awards ==
=== Civil Service of Siam rank ===
- Assistant of Ministry of Agriculture and Cooperatives (Siam)

== See also ==
- Biography at the Thai government

Political offices
Preceded by Prayoon Pamornmontri	Minister of Education; 1944–1945	Succeeded by Phra Trironnasanwisawakam
Preceded by Khuang Aphaiwong	Prime Minister of Siam; 1945	Succeeded by Seni Pramoj
Preceded by Srisena Sombatsiri	Minister of Foreign Affairs; 1945	Succeeded by Seni Pramoj
Preceded by Sindh Kamalanavin	Minister of Agriculture; 1945	Succeeded by Phraya Atthakariniphon
Preceded by Bung Supachalasai	Minister of Public Health; 1945	Succeeded by Adul Aduldejjarus
Preceded by Bung Supachalasai	Minister of Interior; 1945–1946	Succeeded by Srisena Sombatsiri
Preceded by Phraya Atcharajsongsiri	Minister of Agriculture; 1946	Succeeded by Charun Suepseang
Assembly seats
Vacant Title last held by Phraya Atthakariniphon	Deputy President of the Constitution Drafting Assembly of Thailand; 1959–1968	Vacant Title next held by Kramon Thongthammachat; Yupha Udomsak
Preceded by Luang Sutthisanronnakon	President of the National Assembly of Thailand; 1968	Succeeded by Nai Worakanbancha
Preceded by Luang Sutthisanronnakon	President of the Constitution Drafting Assembly of Thailand; 1968	Vacant Title next held by Uthai Phimchaichon
Government offices
Preceded by Direk Jayanama	Secretary to the Cabinet; 1940–1943	Succeeded by Chai Prathipasen
Preceded by Chai Prathipasen	Secretary to the Cabinet acting 1944–1946	Succeeded by Luang Khahakambodi
Academic offices
Preceded by Prayoon Pamornmontri	President of the Chulalongkorn University Council; 1944–1945	Succeeded by Phra Trironnasanwisawakam
Preceded by Prayoon Pamornmontri	President of the University of Moral and Political Sciences Council; 1944–1945	Succeeded by Phra Trironnasanwisawakam
Preceded by Sindh Kamalanavin	President of the Kasetsart University Council; 1945	Succeeded by Phraya Atthakariniphon
Preceded by Phraya Atcharajsongsiri	President of the Kasetsart University Council; 1946	Succeeded by Charun Suepseang
Educational offices
Preceded by Sindh Kamalanavin	President of Kasetsart University; 1945–1946	Succeeded by Luang Suwan Vajokkasikij
