= 1948 Thai coup d'état =

Military coup on 6 April 1948

1948 Thai Silent Coup
Date	6 April 1948; 78 years ago
Location	Bangkok, Siam
Result	Phibun became Prime Minister

Belligerents
Khuang cabinet	National Military Council (NMC); Royal Thai Armed Forces

Commanders and leaders
Khuang Aphaiwong	(Thailand) Phibun

The 1948 Thai coup d'état was a military coup on 6 April by the 1947 coup group. Khuang Aphaiwong, royalist allied, was forced to resign from prime minister, and was replaced by Phibun, the junta leader.

== Background ==
In 1947, a coup d'état ousted the government of Pridi Banomyong's front man, Luang Thamrong, who was replaced by Khuang Aphaiwong, royalist supporter, as Prime Minister of Thailand. The coup was led by military supreme leader, Phibun, and Phin Choonhavan and Kat Katsongkhram, allied with the royalists to regain their political power and the Crown Property back from the Siamese revolution of 1932. An influence of the People Party ended as Pridi left the country on exile.

== Prelude ==
The celebrations of the National Day of the Republic of China in Bangkok, Thailand, on 10 October 1957, attended by Luang Thamrong (middle) and Khuang Aphaiwong (right).

In the election on 29 January 1948, the Democrat Party led by Khuang, won the election with a help from the royalists. Khuang felt confidence over the winning and started to return the political power to the monarch.

Shortly after the election, a group of people called themself "The Democratic Council", consists of a group of politicians led by Phraya Thephatsadin, including members of the Democrat Party such as Luan Pong-sophon, Phong Sittitham, Liang Chaikan, supported Phibun by writing down on the sign, "Supporting Field Marshal Forever." They gathered at Sanam Luang and Lumphini Park, and hunted a list of people to support Phibun.

Eventually, the royalist government made a law that increase the power to control the Crown Property by the monarch as the restoration of their political power and assets, which was taken to the state property by the People Party from the Siamese revolution of 1932. Additionally, former Queen Rambhai Barni was returned the 6 million baht that the People Party seized.

The People Party and the junta had set-up meetings several times that they wanted Phibun and Pridi working together again, to counter the royalists intention to revive an absolute monarchy system. The junta wanted to amend the 1947 interim constitution and tracked the royalists' activities. Rangsit Prayurasakdi, the regent, was dissatisfied by Phibun direction to revive the People Party back.

== Coup ==
On 6 April 1948, at 09.00 am. A group of four officers consisting of Kan Chamnong Phumiwet, Sawat Sawatdironnachai Sawatdikeat, Khun Silapasornchai and Lamai Uthayananon confronted prime minister Khuang at his house, claiming that Khuang had a debt of 28 million baht for expenses on his way back from Kengtung after the end of the World War II. Khuang had paid back to the Ministry of Finance in the amount of 9 Million baht, but Major Khuang refused to pay another. They requested Khuang to resign from the Prime Minister in 24 hours with a reason that Mr Khuang's government could not solve the economic problems of the nation that had fallen. Especially in the cost of living that has skyrocketed.

At noon, Khuang sent a confederate soldier to meet the senior military officer who was the leader of the coup on 8 November 1947 at the Suankularb Palace, which was the command base. To ask for confirmation on this matter, but was not found later at 02.00 fm. Phin Choonhavan, one of the leaders of the coup d'etat, traveled to meet Khuang by himself to the house. Khuang tried to contact with Naval commander, and the air commander for protection but no response. Khuang called the cabinet meeting at the house. Ministry of Interior ordered the police to arrest this group of military officers as a rebellion. Kukrit Pramoj, the Minister of Finance, confirmed that the government could not reduce the cost of living down.

At the end of 04.00 fm, Khuang resigned from the Prime Minister. Phibun continued as Prime Minister. Rangsit Prayurasakdi was disappointed as he tried to help Khuang by denying the resignation letter. Rangsit also ordered Senates to stop the resignation but it could not stop that.
