= 1948 Siamese general election =

← 1946	29 January 1948	1952 →
- 99 of the 186 seats in the House of Representatives
- Turnout: 29.50% (▼3.02pp)
Party	Leader	Seats	+/–
Democrat	Khuang Aphaiwong	53	New
People's Party	Liang Chaiyakal	12	New
Thammathipat Party	Plaek Phibunsongkhram	5	New
Independents	–	30	−66
This lists parties that won seats. See the complete results below.
Prime Minister before	Prime Minister after
Khuang Aphaiwong	Khuang Aphaiwong

General elections were held in Siam on 29 January 1948. Following the 1947 coup, the unicameral parliament elected in 1946 was abrogated. It was replaced by a bicameral parliament with a 100-seat appointed Senate and a 99-member House of Representatives.

Voter turnout was 30%.

== Results ==
Party	Votes	%	Seats
Democrat Party			53
People's Party			12
Thammathipat Party			5
Independents			30
Royal appointees			87
Total			187
Total votes	2,117,464	–	
Registered voters/turnout	7,176,891	29.50	
Source: Darling, Nohlen et al.

== Aftermath ==
In order to comply with the constitutional requirement of one member of the House of Representatives for every 150,000 citizens, supplementary elections were held in June 1949.
