= Silent Coup (Thailand) =

Date	29 November 1951
Location	Thailand
Result	Coup successful

Belligerents
Government of Thailand	National Military Council of Thailand

Commanders and leaders
(Thailand) Plaek Phibunsongkhram	(Thailand) Gen. Phao Siyanon (Thailand) Field Marshal Phin Choonhavan (Thailand) Field Marshal Sarit Thanarat (Thailand) Air Chief Marshal Fuen Ronnaphagrad Ritthakhanee

Thailand's Silent Coup of 29 November 1951, otherwise known as the Radio Coup, consolidated the military's hold on the country. It reinstated the 1932 constitution, which effectively eliminated the Senate, established a unicameral legislature composed equally of elected and government-appointed members, and allowed serving military officers to supplement their commands with important ministerial portfolios.

== Prelude to the coup ==
Having defeated the navy in the Manhattan Rebellion, the army-led Coup Group turned its attentions toward the remaining civilians in government. Although the military was in control of the army, politicians and legislators continued to annoy the generals. Throughout 1950 and the following year, the civilians and military men bickered over spoils and offices, and, despite its monopoly on the use of force, the Coup Group lost some political battles. In January 1951 the civilian parties forced the prime minister, Field Marshal Plaek Phibunsongkhram (Phibun), to replace two military ministers with civilians. Similarly the Senate remained a royalist stronghold. In one October session senators sharply attacked the government for its violent suppression of the Manhattan Rebellion. In November the upper house blocked a bill to increase the military voice in elections.

The Coup Group quickly decided that rewriting or amending the constitution was the only way to get rid of these irritants. Because the 1949 constitution drafted by the palace-backed Democrats barred active government officials—including military and police officers—from the cabinet, the Coup Group found it objectionable.

In August and October 1951 the powerful police chief, Phao Siyanon, travelled to Switzerland to persuade the young King Bhumibol to accept a constitution more amenable to the military. On the first trip, the king apparently failed to object to the proposal, but Phao returned to Thailand empty-handed. In November the Coup Group decided to proceed without the king's approval.

By then the generals' only obstacle was Phibun. Because his strength lay in the multiplicity of political groups and his ability to play one off the other, the field marshal resisted all efforts by the Coup Group to remove civilians from their positions in the administration.

== The coup ==
In the end, the Coup Group chose to disregard Phibun as well as the king. On 26 November they sent a representative to the prime minister to suggest reverting the 1949 constitution to the less democratic and anti-royalist one of 1932. The proposal was immediately rejected by Phibun, but, three days later, nine leading members of the Coup Group—among them Phao Siyanon, Field Marshals Phin Chunhawan, Sarit Thanarat, and Air Chief Marshal Fuen Ronnaphakat—pressed him in person. Phibun again angrily rebuffed them. By then the Coup Group was getting desperate. The king planned to return from Lausanne in two days to assume his royal duties and the generals could not risk a dangerous confrontation with the monarch. Therefore, that evening, while the king was en route from Singapore to Bangkok, they announced the dissolution of parliament, reinstatement of the 1932 constitution, and formation of a provisional government. Phibun initially refused to join the new government but, after much negotiating, accepted the fait accompli. The next morning he signed on again as prime minister.

== Aftermath ==
As with the Manhattan Rebellion, it was Phao who gained the most from the coup. His visits to the king indicate that he probably led the coup, and, most likely because of this role, he was able to take advantage of the civilians' defeat more readily than the other Coup Group members. While Phao's rival, Sarit, entered the cabinet as deputy minister of defence unaccompanied by close supporters, the Phao-Phin clique captured five cabinet slots. Phao's own appointment as deputy minister of the interior gave him effective control over this politically powerful ministry that allowed him to ruthlessly eliminate parliamentary opposition.
