= Army General Staff plot =

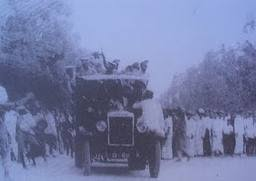
Date	October 1, 1948
Location	Bangkok, Thailand
Result	Coup failed

Belligerents
(Thailand) Thai government	(Thailand) Royal Thai Army

Commanders and leaders
(Thailand) Plaek Phibunsongkhram	(Thailand) Lt. Gen. Chit Mansin Sinatyotharak (Thailand) Major Gen. Net Khemayothin

The Army General Staff plot (Thai: กบฏเสนาธิการ) was a failed 1948 attempt to overthrow the Thai government of Field Marshal Plaek Phibunsongkhram.

The plotters were members of the army general staff, among whom were Lieutenant-General Chit Mansin Sinatyotharak, Pridi's former supreme commander, and Major General Net Khemayothin, a close associate of Phibun during the war and later a prominent Seri Thai member. They objected to the army's increasingly corrupt and inefficient leadership, and hoped to reorganise and professionalise the military. Their plan called for the arrest of Phibun, top government officials, and leading army officers during a birthday party for Sarit Thanarat scheduled for 1 October 1948.

Although the plotters enjoyed widespread support within the general staff, the Coup Group which had re-installed Phibun received advance notice of their plans. On 21 September General Phin Chunhawan recommended that the ministry of defence and other ministries carry out a purge of government officials. His suggestion was approved by the cabinet, and on October 1 the arrests of the coup plotters began. Before the week was over, more than fifty army and reservist and several prominent supporters of Pridi were arrested.
