= 1947 Thai coup d'état =

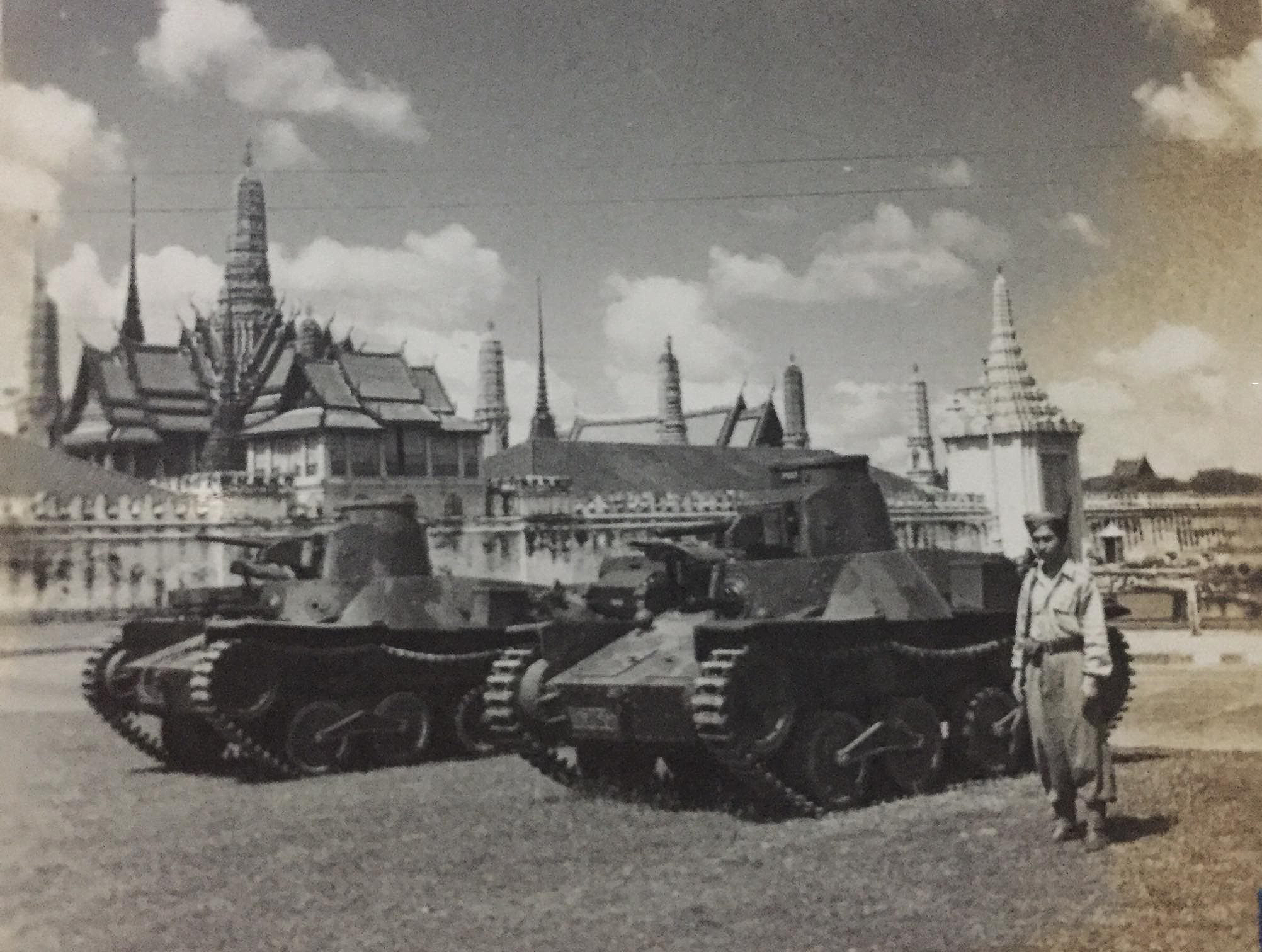
- Type 95 Ha-Go tanks in Bangkok during the coup
Date	8 November 1947; 79 years ago
Location	Bangkok, Siam
Result	Military takeover: Prime Minister Luang Thamrong removed; Pridi Banomyong exiled; People's Party influence ends; 1946 Constitution repealed; National Military Council (NMC) established under Supreme Commander Plaek Phibunsongkhram; NMC selects Khuang Aphaiwong as next Prime Minister; 1947 Interim Constitution enacted and followed by the 1949 Royalist Constitution; Crown Property reverts to monarchical control

Belligerents
People's Party government	Royal Thai Army; Supported by: Regent of Thailand

Commanders and leaders
Luang Thamrong; Pridi Banomyong	(Thailand) Plaek Phibunsongkhram (Thailand) Phin Choonhavan (Thailand) Kat Katsongkhram

The coup d'état of 8 November 1947 (Thai: รัฐประหาร 8 พฤศจิกายน พ.ศ. 2490) was a military coup d'état that took place in Thailand on the evening of 8 November 1947 and ended in the early morning hours of 9 November. The coup ousted the government of Pridi Banomyong's frontman, Luang Thamrong, to make royalist Khuang Aphaiwong Prime Minister of Thailand. The coup was led by Plaek Phibunsongkhram, Phin Choonhavan and Kat Katsongkhram as a bid to regain the royalists' political power and Crown Property back from the reforms of the Siamese revolution of 1932. The influence of the People Party ended as Pridi left the country on exile.

== Background ==
=== United States influence ===
The United States established the Bretton Woods system for commercial and financial relations to promote capitalism after the end of the Second World War. To prevent communism, Harry S. Truman cabinet established an embassy in Bangkok by sending ambassadors Charles Yost and Kenneth Landon to Bangkok in 1945. Several ambassadors had worked for the Office of Strategic Services, the US anti-communism agency, in which they had worked with the Free Thai Movement, led by Pridi Banomyong and Thai royal family.

=== Pridi and the royalists ===
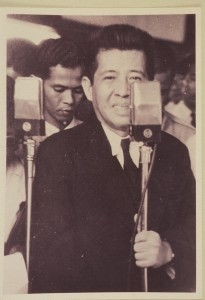
Pridi Banomyong declared peace in 1945 after 'Free Thai's winning the Second World War.

On 1 August 1944, as the Allies, sided by underground resistance the Free Thai Movement, were winning the Second World War, the pro-Japanese strongman Field Marshal Plaek Phibunsongkhram was forced by parliament to resign his premiership. He was replaced by, Khuang Aphaiwong, a civilian who had the backing of Pridi Phanomyong, regent for the absent King Ananda Mahidol and head of the Free Thai Movement. Pridi group and royalists were helping each other during the war, but after they gained control of the government, they split because of different goal settings. Royalists were trying to spring back from a lost by the 1932 revolution, reportedly wanting to bring absolute monarchy system back. Pridi group regained control back from Phibun.

=== Disruption of Pridi group ===
Khuang Aphaiwong resigned in August 1945. Pridi invited, the US-supported, a royalist, and Free Thai Movement member, Seni Pramot to become prime minister. In January 1946, Seni resigned and asked for the dissolution of parliament to pave the way for elections. Khuang and his new royalist allies were elected to power. But because Pridi chose to support Direk Chaiyanam as his personal candidate, Khuang included none of the former regent's allies in his cabinet, but placed many of his opponents, including Seni. Pridi's followers immediately sought revenge, continually harassing the government, further intensifying the bitterness between themselves and the conservatives. Within six weeks Khuang abruptly resigned, forcing Pridi to reluctantly step in and risk his personal prestige. Up until the resignation of his wartime ally, Pridi had enjoyed the prestige of his position as a senior statesman without having to involve himself in everyday politics. Pridi's failure to control inflation tarnished his reputation for competence, while official corruption bedeviled his governments.

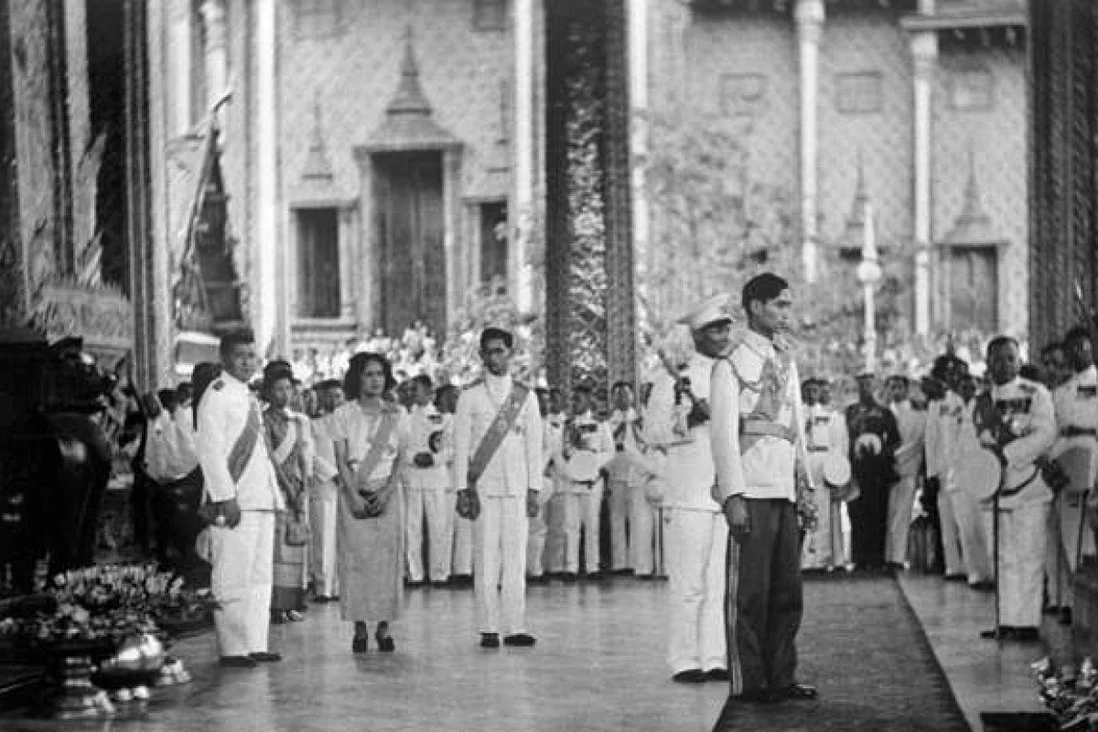
King Ananda Mahidol returned from Switzerland to Thailand, during an official ceremony in January 1946 in Bangkok, with Pridi Banomyong, Srinagarindra, and Prince Bhumibol.

=== Ananda death crisis ===
On 9 June 1946, the 20 year-old King Ananda Mahidol, who had restored popularity to the monarchy, was found dead in his bedroom of a gunshot wound to the head, resulting in a serious political crisis. Khuang, Seni, and the royalists who dominated their newly formed Democrat Party were quick to blame Pridi, spreading the rumour that the prime minister and his supporters had assassinated the monarch for their own political purposes and possibly to establish a republic. Conservative newspapers criticised the government for failing to protect the monarch, provoking Pridi to use repressive measures: he declared a state of emergency, censored newspapers, and arrested two editors and two opposition MPs. In an attempt to preserve his political influence, Pridi resigned on 21 August 1946. He was replaced five days later by Luang Thamrong, who would serve as Pridi's front man. Twenty airforce officers were arrested in November on charge of plotting to seize the government.

== Prelude ==
=== Phibun and royalists allied ===
In 1947, Phibun was still widely popular as he planned to comeback to Thai politics. Democrat Party leader, Khuang Aphaiwong supported Phibun to be next prime minister. Phin Choonhavan and Kard Kardsonggram, retired army officers, had tried to contact Phibun with a help from Democrat Party to inform the coup plot.

Phibun allied and royalist allied tried to overthrow Pridi regime. The army, led by Phibun, wanted to regain their power, and the death of Ananda were the root of royalist goal. Royalists attacked Pridi regime with gossips on a newspaper, as one of gossips was that Phibun were planning a coup with Seni Pramoj becoming a prime minister.

=== The Thamrong government ===
The celebrations of the National Day of the Republic of China in Bangkok, Thailand, on 10 October 1957, attended by Luang Thamrong (middle) and Khuang Aphaiwong (right).

Luang Thamrong's government was faced with charges of corruption, stemming from a government program to hand out free shovels and spades to farmers. The farming equipment brought and handed out was sub-standard, leading to charges of corruption and embezzlement by the public. The scandal became known as "devouring the hoes and spades" (Thai:กินจอบกินเสียม). This, and other scandals, led to a debate, called for by the Democrats, and a vote of no confidence, which Thamrong survived.

Luang Thamrong privately confided to US Ambassador Edwin F. Stanton that the evidence gathered during investigations of the regicide implicated King Bhumibol in the late king's death. Those next in the line of succession to the throne, Prince Chumbhotbongs Paribatra and Prince Bhanubandhu Yugala, were both unpopular and he thought they would probably not be able to ascend to the throne. Luang Thamrong doubted whether the murder would ever be cleared up inasmuch as he felt Thailand could not dispense with the monarchy.

When asked by a journalist the prime minister joked that he was, "already sleeping for a coup" [lit. "Already lying in wait for the revolution."] (Thai: "ก็นอนรอการปฏิวัติอยู่แล้ว"), confident at the time that he had the backing of the military, especially the army.

== Coup ==
=== Army seizes country ===
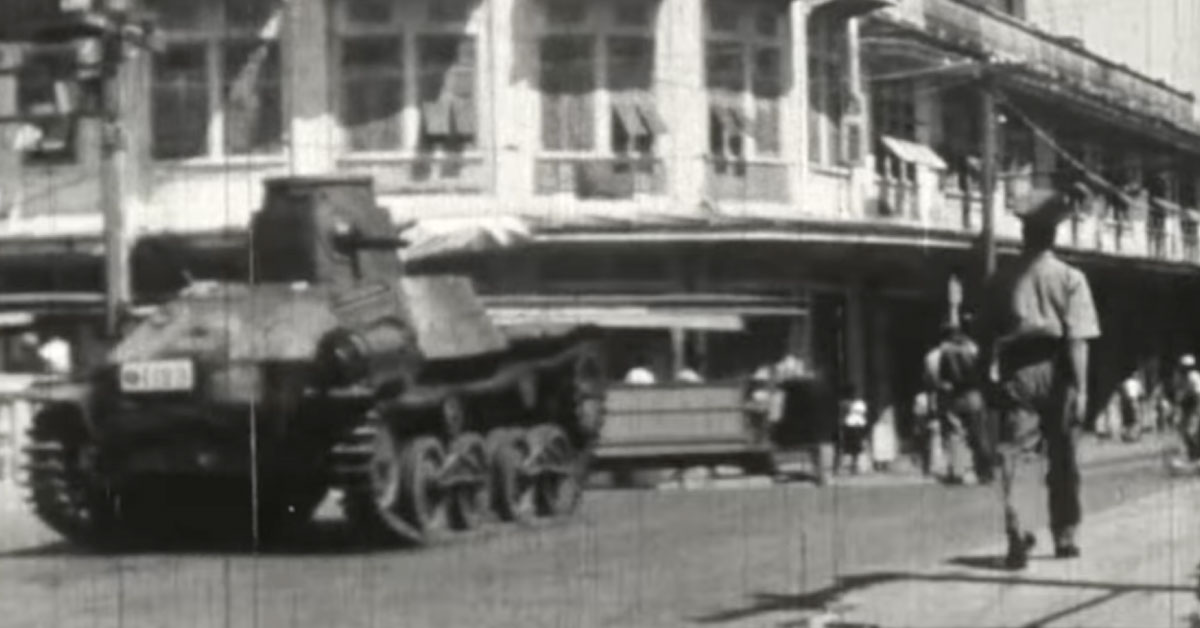
Tank in Bangkok 1947 amid coup d'état

On 9 November 1947 at 2:00 am, the armed forces, led by Phibun, began the coup by sending a squadron of tanks to Amphorn Gardens near the government centre. They immediately arrested Prime Minister Thamrong and held him hostage after Thamrong was fleeing from a gay bar. Another tank squadron went to search for Pridi. After arriving at his residence, they found that he had escaped, since he was told of the plot beforehand by an informant. Pridi's house was sprayed with machine gun fire. Leaving only his wife and children who were arrested. Unbeknownst to them, Pridi was hiding under the protection of Admiral Luang Sinthusongkramchai, commander of the Royal Thai Navy at his base.

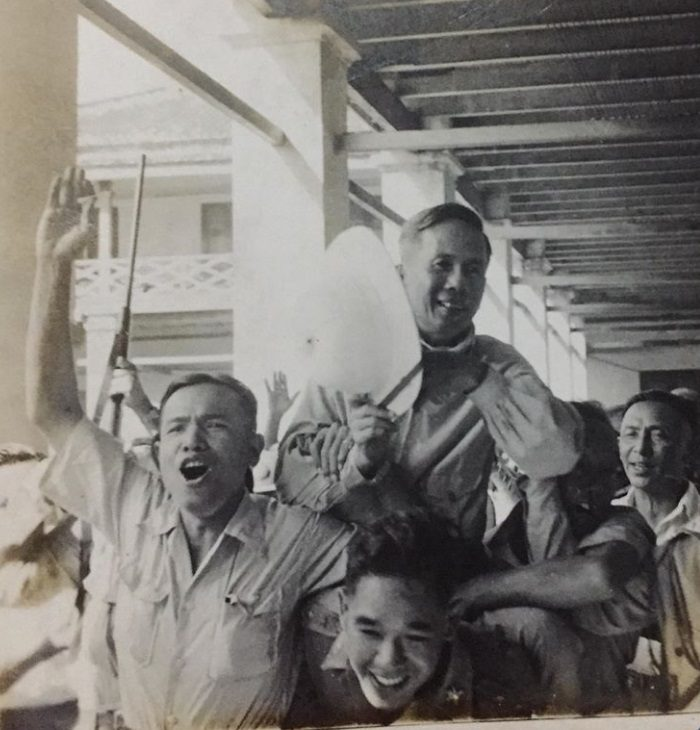
Phibun led the junta in 1947 after the coup

The junta called themselves the "National Military Council" included Lieutenant General Phin Choonhavan and Colonel Kard Kardsonggram. Other members of the group were: Police General Phao Sriyanond, Colonel Sarit Dhanarajata, Colonel Thanom Kittikachorn, and Lieutenant Colonel Praphas Charusathien, Captain Chatichai Choonhavan.

On the morning of 9 November, General Choonhavan, the spokesman for the junta, read a declaration to the press and broadcast by radio outlining the cause of the coup. He claimed the government's incompetence caused the people to suffer from high prices and the general lack of food and goods. Thus, they reckoned that the government was unable to solve the problem and must be removed by force. During the speech, Choonhavan cried profusely, and was dubbed sarcastically by the press as the "hero of tears" (Thai: วีรบุรุษเจ้าน้ำตา), or the "crying patriot" (Thai: บุรุษผู้รักชาติจนน้ำตาไหล).

=== Royalists regain power ===
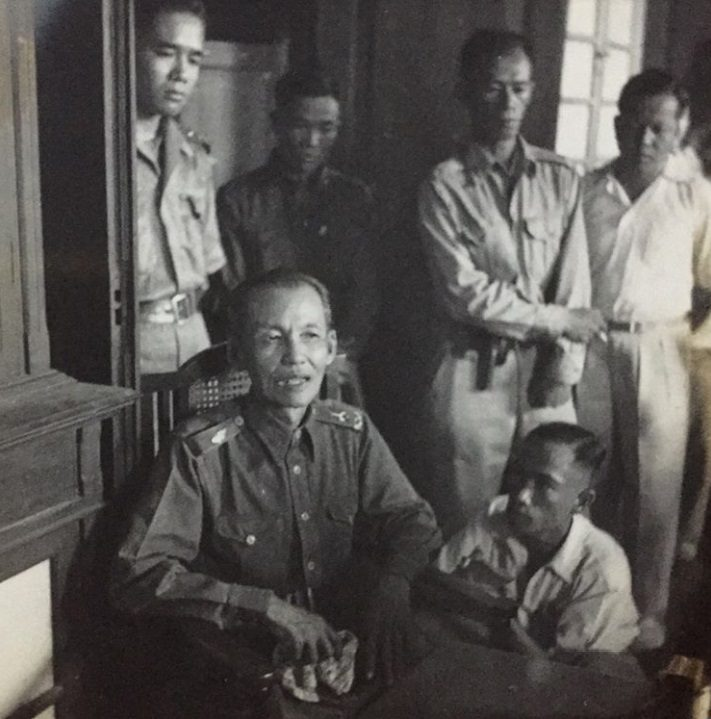
Lieutenant General Phin Choonhavan 1947

Royalist allied were led by Khuang Aphaiwong and Seni Pramoj, celebrated the junta on the same day. The National Soldier's Committee then called for Khuang, the Leader of the Opposition to take over as prime minister. At Khuang house, there were full of the Democrat Party members and royal family members. Bhanubandhu Yugala, one of Chakri dynasty members, was reportedly delighted by the coup. Khuang assumed the position on 12 November, becoming prime minister for the third time. The committee set up their own legislative assembly called the "Council of Ministers of the Assembly" (Thai: คณะรัฐมนตรีสภา), making a deal with Khaung that, if he stayed out of their business, they would stay out of his.

On 25 November 1947, Prince Rangsit of Chainat, the Regent of Thailand, signed a provisional charter or the Constitution of 1947, drafted by the royalists such as Seni Pramoj and his brother Kukrit Pramoj, which giving more power to the Monarchy of Thailand. It allowed the king to appoint 100 members of parliament and revived the Privy Council back. Khuang cabinet included more royalists since the 1932. Chaiching, an academic, noted that a quick approval of the coup and the charter by Rangsit was the key of coup success. King Bhumibol, who was studying in Lausanne, Switzerland returned the letter to the junta with a satisfaction.

A democracy development and the People Party started to deteriorate after the coup, which was the turning point of the royalists to regain the power back from the Siamese revolution of 1932.

== Aftermath ==
In 1948, the royalist government made a law that increase the power to control the Crown Property by the monarch as the restoration of their political power and assets, which was taken to the state property by the People Party from the Siamese revolution of 1932. Additionally, former Queen Rambhai Barni was returned the 6 million baht that the People Party seized.

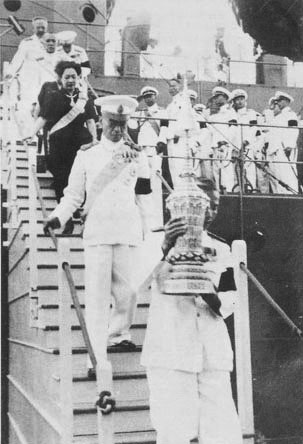
Queen Rambhai Barni bringing King Prajadhipok's ashes back to Thailand, 1949

On 29 January 1948, elections were held in which Khuang and his party won the majority of the votes and seats in the new assembly. Later, Khuang was confirmed as prime minister. But on 6 April, the committee, under the leadership of Kardsonggram, forced Khuang to resign his post. They instead invited Field Marshal Phibun to return to the post. He became prime minister for the second time on 8 April 1948.

The coup inadvertently led to the draft and signing of the 1947 Constitution and 1949 Constitution. The most Royalist constitutions to date, it gave the monarchy back almost all of the powers that were taken away from it by the 1932 Revolution. They were similar to the constitution draft by King Prajadhipok before the 1932.

The reinstatement of Phibun and his dictatorship. The coup also increased the role of the Royal Thai Army, and gave it a model of how to carry out coups in the future. Henceforth, under the pretext of saving the nation, the military would topple any democratic government it pleased. The coup elicited little response from the populace. The Democrat Party remained in opposition until 1975. Phibun would resume his dictatorship and rule until 1957.

On 20 November 1948, Pridi was spirited out of the country by British and American agents, never to return to Thailand again. He died in Paris in 1983, aged 83.

== See also ==
- 1948 Thai coup d'état
- National Military Council
- Military of Thailand
- Politics of Thailand
- History of Thailand (1932–1973)
