= Khuang Aphaiwong =

Prime Minister of Thailand (1944–45, 1946, and 1947–48)

Luang Kowit-aphaiwong Khuang Aphaiwong PCh MPCh PM
- ควง อภัยวงศ์
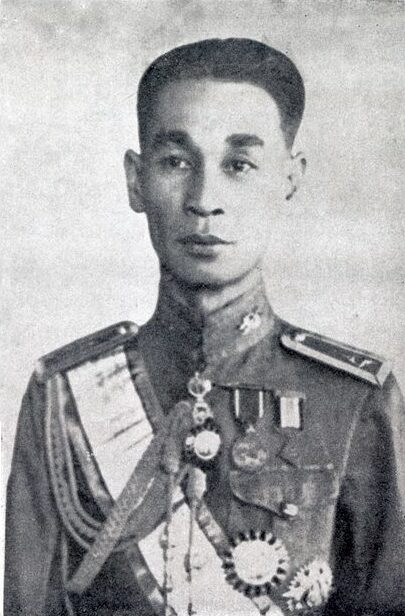
- Khuang in 1958

4th Prime Minister of Thailand
- In office 10 November 1947 – 8 April 1948
- Monarch: Bhumibol Adulyadej
- Preceded by: Thawan Thamrongnawasawat
- Succeeded by: Plaek Phibunsongkhram
- In office 31 January 1946 – 24 March 1946
- Monarch: Ananda Mahidol
- Preceded by: Seni Pramoj
- Succeeded by: Pridi Banomyong
- In office 1 August 1944 – 31 August 1945
- Monarch: Ananda Mahidol
- Preceded by: Plaek Phibunsongkhram
- Succeeded by: Thawi Bunyaket

Leader of the Democrat Party
- In office 6 April 1946 – 15 March 1968
- Preceded by: Position established
- Succeeded by: Seni Pramoj

Personal details
- Born: Khuang (Note: At that time, Thais did not have surnames.); 17 May 1902 Phra Tabong, Burapha, Siam (now Battambang, Cambodia)
- Died: 15 March 1968 (aged 65) Bangkok, Thailand
- Party: Democrat
- Other political affiliations: Free Thai Movement
- Spouse: Lekha Kunadilok

Khuang Aphaiwong (also spelled Kuang, Abhaiwong and Abhaiwongse; Thai: ควง อภัยวงศ์, pronounced [kʰūaŋ ʔā.pʰāj.wōŋ]; 17 May 1902 – 15 March 1968), (Note: In this Thai name, the person is referred to by his given name, Khuang, and not by his surname, Aphaiwong.) also known by his noble title Luang Kowit-aphaiwong (Thai: หลวงโกวิทอภัยวงศ์, pronounced [lǔaŋ kōː.wít.ʔā.pʰāj.wōŋ]), was the founder of the Democrat Party and three times the prime minister of Thailand: from August 1944 to 1945, from January to May 1946, and from November 1947 to April 1948.

== Early life and political career ==
Khuang was born in Battambang (a city in Cambodia), a son of the Siamese governor Chao Phraya Abhayabhubet. The Aphaiwongs were of royal Khmer lineage. Khuang attended Debsirin School and Assumption College, Bangkok, later studying engineering at the Ecole Centrale de Lyon in France. On his return to Thailand, he worked in the telegraph department, finally becoming director of the department. This earned him the feudal title Luang Kowit-aphaiwong. He married Lekha Kunadilok (Goone-Tilleke), daughter of Ceylon-born lawyer William Alfred Goone-Tilleke, founder of the law firm Tilleke & Gibbins.

=== Promoter of regime change and minister ===
Khuang was a member of the civil faction of Khana Ratsadon ("People's Party"), the group that promoted the Siamese revolution of 1932, that brought a regime change from absolute to constitutional monarchy. Afterwards, he served as minister without portfolio in the cabinets of Phraya Phahon Phonphayuhasena and Plaek Phibunsongkhram (Phibun). During World War II he was commissioned a major and joined the King's Guard. As such he was at the head of the mission to Battambang which in July 1941 took control of the Cambodian territories occupied during the Franco-Thai War, to be renamed Phra Tabong Province. His father had been governor of part of this region before it was ceded to France 1907. Later he became minister of commerce and communications.

Despite holding positions in the government, Khuang was largely apolitical and held technical posts such as Director-General of the Post and Telegraph Department, and Minister of Communications.

== Prime Minister of Thailand ==
=== First premiership (1944–1945) ===
On 24 July 1944, Phibun submitted his resignation to the Council of Regency over the National Assembly's refusal to accept two bills concerning the construction of a new capital city at Phetchabun and a Buddhist city near Saraburi, which were defeated on July 20 and July 22 respectively. Whether this was a planned conspiracy to oust Phibun is unclear, with Khuang stating that Pridi Banomyong (Phibun's rival since the 1930s) had sent agents to get in touch with Assembly members. The council accepted Phibun's resignation on July 26. In an emergency session, the Assembly elected Khuang as Prime Minister, who was the vice-president of the Assembly at the time. He was a compromise candidate, standing between the Phibun supporters and the opposition Free Thai Movement. Khuang attributed his success to Pridi's influence. His appointment was opposed by Prince Aditya Dibabha, head of the Council of Regency, who refused to sign the decree appointing Khuang as PM. After failing to persuade Khuang against becoming PM, Aditya resigned from the council on July 31. Pridi was named the sole regent by the Assembly and appointed Khuang PM on August 1.

Khuang's cabinet was mainly made of civilians and Pridi supporters. Sindhu Songkhramchai of the navy was persuaded to become the Minister of Defence after Khuang had difficulties finding someone who would take the post. Phahon joined the cabinet as a Minister without portfolio to balance Phibun's influence over the army. After his resignation, Phibun had been at the military complex he built in Lopburi and rumours circulated that Phibun would launce a coup against Khuang. To end tensions, the two men met in Lopburi and Phibun wrote a statement promising he had no intentions to oust Khuang. However, as long as Phibun maintained a role in the military there was always the possibility of a coup. In another meeting, Khuang sought to get Phibun to resign from his role as Supreme Commander of the Armed Forces. Phibun refused. Once back in Bangkok, Khuang secretly abolished Phibun's post and named Phahon as Commander-in-Chief. Military units were then instructed to follow only Phahon's orders. Giving that the navy was largely loyal to Pridi, Khuang and Phahon sought refuge at the naval headquarters in Thonburi in anticipation of a response from Phibun. Phibun, however, accepted the change and retired to Bangkok.

In regards to World War II, Khuang made the re-establishment of good relations with the Japanese his priority, even if it was superficial. In the first policy announcement of his government, Khuang reaffirmed that Thai foreign policy would align with the Japanese. Matters relating to the Free Thai Movement were left to Pridi and Thawi Bunyaket. Additionally, he shielded the Free Thai who collaborated with the Allies.

After the defeat of the Japanese in August 1945, Khuang resigned on 31 August 1945, to make way for a new administration by the Free Thai forces. Thawi succeeded Khuang in a caretaker role until Senj Pramoj was appointed PM on September 17.

=== Second premiership (January–March 1946) ===
In 1946 he was one of the founders of the conservative Democrat Party, and became its first leader. The fourth national elections on 6 January 1946 were won by the Democrat Party, which gained him a second term as prime minister starting on 31 January. Only 45 days later, on 24 March, his government lost a vote of no-confidence in parliament and he resigned.

=== Third premiership and later life (November 1947–April 1948) ===
Khuang became prime minister a third time on 10 November 1947 following a coup d'état led by Field Marshal Phin Chunhawan. In the 1948 general election held on 29 January, Khuang's Democrat Party won 53 seats and secured a slim majority in the 99-member House of Representatives, although all members ran as independents. Khuang's government spent the next three months preparing to draft a new constitution to replace the 1946 constitution. The new constitution would further limit the military's role. The coup leaders were not pleased and forced Khuang to resign on 8 April 1948. This enabled Phibun to become prime minister again. Khuang continued in politics as the opposition leader and leader of the Democrat Party until all political parties were banned in 1958. His wife, Khunying Lekha Aphaiwong, was appointed senator in 1949, becoming one of the first female politicians of Thailand.

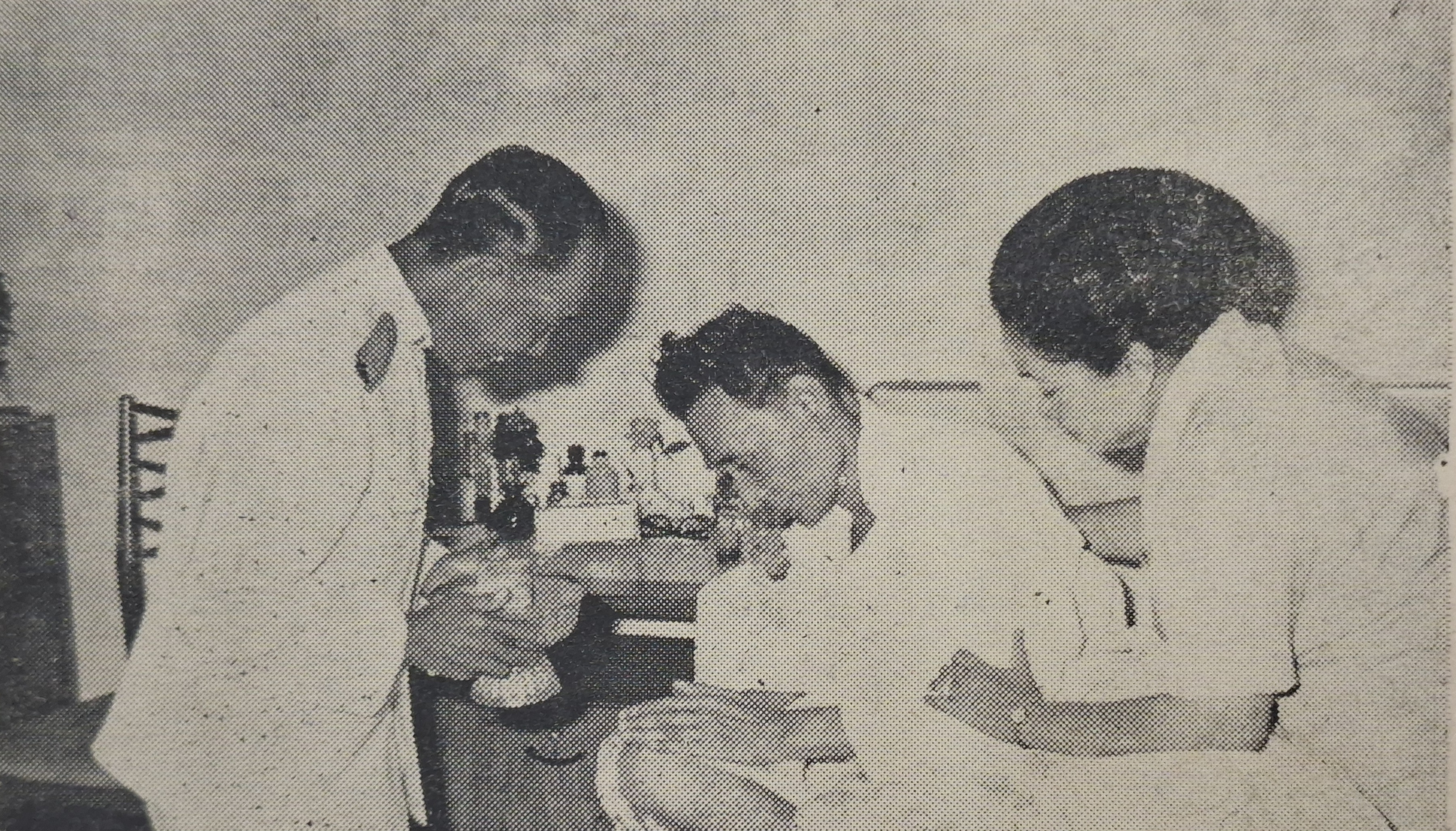
Khuang Last image

Khuang died on 15 March 1968, at age 65.

== Honours ==
=== Thai Decorations ===
- Knight Grand Cross of the Order of Chula Chom Klao
- Knight Grand Cordon of the Order of the White Elephant
- Knight Grand Cross of the Order of the Crown of Thailand
- Victory Medal - Franco-Thai War
- Victory Medal - Pacific War
- Safeguarding the Constitution Medal
- Medal for Service in the Interior - Franco-Thai War
- Rama VIII's Royal Cypher Medal, 1st Class
- Rama IX's Royal Cypher Medal, 1st Class

=== Foreign Decorations ===
- Taiwan :
  - Special Grand Cordon of the Order of Propitious Clouds

== Notes ==
Political offices
Vacant Title last held by Phra Sarasatpraphan	Deputy Minister of Education; 1938–1941	Succeeded by Prayoon Pamornmontri
Preceded by Charun Rattanakun Seriroengrit as Minister of Economy	Minister of Transport; 1941–1942	Succeeded by Charun Rattanakun Seriroengrit
Preceded by Charun Rattanakun Seriroengrit	Minister of Commerce; 1942–1943	Succeeded by Dej Snidvongs
Preceded by Plaek Phibunsongkhram	Prime Minister of Thailand; 1944–1945	Succeeded by Thawi Bunyaket
Preceded by Charun Rattanakun Seriroengrit	Minister of Transport; 1944–1945	Succeeded by Saphrang Devahastin na Ayudhya
Preceded by Pao Pienlert Boripanyutakit	Minister of Finance; 1944–1945	Succeeded by Leng Srisomwongse
Preceded by Dej Snidvongs	Minister of Commerce; 1945	Succeeded by Luang Supachalasai
Preceded by Seni Pramoj	Prime Minister of Siam; 1946	Succeeded by Pridi Banomyong
Preceded by Saphrang Devahastin na Ayudhya	Minister of Transport; 1946	Succeeded by Saphrang Devahastin na Ayudhya
Vacant Phin Choonhavan (acting) Title last held by Thawan Thamrongnawasawat	Prime Minister of Siam; 1947–1948	Succeeded by Plaek Phibunsongkhram
Preceded by Chuang Chaungsakdisongkram	Minister of Agriculture; 1947	Succeeded by Prince Sithiporn Kridakara
Preceded by Chit Munsilpa Sinadyodharaksa	Minister of Interior; 1948	Succeeded by Plaek Phibunsongkhram
Assembly seats
Preceded by Phra Prachonpachanuk	Deputy Speaker of the House of Representatives; 1944	Succeeded by Fuan Suphannasan
Preceded by Luan Phongsophon	Member of the House of Representatives for Phra Nakhon, 2nd District; 1946–1947 with Phraya Srivisanvaja	District eliminated
New constituency	Members of the House of Representatives for Phra Nakhon; 1948–1951 with Seni Pramoj; Kukrit Pramoj; Phisek Phrommayon; Chit Munsilpa Sinadyodharaksa; Plod Plodporapak Phibunphanuwat; Praphat Wanthanasan	Vacant Title next held by Praphat Wanthanasan; Chat Sriyanon; Plod Plodporapak Phibunphanuwat; Chintasen Chaiyakam; Bhethai Amatayakul; Chot Kunakasem
Preceded by Chat Sriyanon; Channothai Rieksut; Chintasen Chaiyakam; Bhethai Amatayakul; Chot Kunakasem	Members of the House of Representatives for Phra Nakhon; 1957–1958 with Plaek Phibunsongkhram; Pao Pienlert Boripanyutakit; Munee Mahasanthana Vejayantarungsarit; Banyat Devahastin na Ayudhya; Phra Prayutchonlathi; Phraya Ladphlithammaprakal; Mangkorn Phromyothi; Luang Sawasdisorayut; Luang Angkananurak; Chalit Kulkamthon; Thawin Rawangphai; Sombun Sirithon; Luang Supachalasai; Luang Srisaliphit; Chit Munsilpa Sinadyodharaksa; Chaen Patchusanon; Luang Nora-atbancha; Lek Nana; Sawas Sumalyasak; Natthawut Sutthisongkram; Kasem Bunsri; Kamol Chanthornsorn; Luang Prakobnitisarn	Vacant Title next held by Seni Pramoj; Lek Nana; Kasem Bunsri; Sombun Sirithon; Thammanoon Thien-ngern; Pracha Buranathanit; Sira Patthamakom; Sanah Raktham; Bhichai Rattakul; Surat Osathanugrah; Sawas Sumalyasak; Damrong Latthaphiphat; Phan Premmani; Natthawut Sutthisongkram; Busarin Phakdikul
Party political offices
First	Leader of the Democrat Party; 1946–1968	Vacant Title next held by Seni Pramoj
Civic offices
Preceded by Charun Rattanakun Seriroengrit	Director-General of the State Railway of Thailand acting 1942	Succeeded by Charun Rattanakun Seriroengrit
Academic offices
Preceded by Chuang Chaungsakdisongkram	President of the Kasetsart University Council; 1947	Succeeded by Prince Sithiporn Kridakara
