= 1952 Thai general election =

- 26 February 1952
- 123 of the 246 seats in the House of Representatives
- Turnout: 38.95% (▲9.45pp)
Party	Seats	+/–
Independents	123	+24
This lists parties that won seats. See the complete results below.
Prime Minister before	Prime Minister after
Plaek Phibunsongkhram	Plaek Phibunsongkhram

General elections were held in Thailand on 26 February 1952 to elect half of the members of the House of Representatives. At the time there were no political parties, so all candidates ran as independents. Voter turnout was 39%.

== Results ==
Party	Votes	%	Seats
Independents			123
Appointed members			123
Total			246
Total votes	2,961,291	–	
Registered voters/turnout	7,602,591	38.95	
Source: Nohlen et al.
