= Prayoon Yuthasastrkosol =

Thai admiral and politician

Admiral of the Fleet Prayoon Yuthasastrkosol
- ประยูร ยุทธศาสตร์โกศล
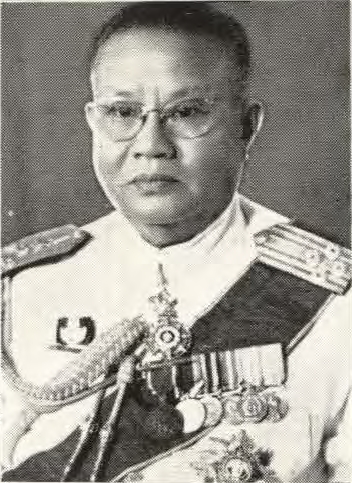

Deputy Prime Minister of Thailand
- In office 21 March 1957 – 16 September 1957
- Prime Minister: Plaek Phibunsongkhram

Minister of Culture
- In office 2 August 1955 – 16 September 1957
- Prime Minister: Plaek Phibunsongkhram
- Preceded by: Sunawinwiwat
- Succeeded by: Pin Malakul

Minister of Cooperatives
- In office 24 March 1952 – 1 August 1955
- Prime Minister: Plaek Phibunsongkhram

Minister of Agriculture
- In office 6 December 1951 – 23 March 1952
- Prime Minister: Plaek Phibunsongkhram
- Preceded by: Pholasinthanawat
- Succeeded by: Chamnanarthayutha

Commander in Chief of the Royal Thai Navy
- In office 1 December 1951 – 19 September 1957
- Preceded by: Pholasinthanawat
- Succeeded by: Chamnanarthayutha

Personal details
- Born: 19 September 1893 Siam
- Died: 11 December 1975 (aged 82) Thailand
- Spouse: Prayoon Jansawad
- Education: Royal Thai Naval Academy

Military service
- Allegiance: Thailand
- Branch/service: Royal Thai Navy
- Years of service: 1951-1957
- Rank: General; Admiral of the Fleet; Air Chief Marshal

Luang Yuthasastr Kosol (Thai: หลวงยุทธศาสตร์โกศล, personal name Prayoon Yuthasastrkosol, 19 October 1893 – 11 December 1975) was a Commander of the Royal Thai Navy.

== Early career ==
Prayoon joined the Royal Thai Naval Academy on 18 April 1919, and continued his studies at Thai Naval War College in 1932, where his fraternity brothers dubbed him "The professor", a nickname he kept throughout his navy career. Prayoon served in the Royal Thai Navy from 1932 to his retirement in 1957 in many positions:

- Commander in Chief of the Royal Thai Navy
- Admiral of the Fleet in the Royal Thai Navy
- General in the Royal Thai Army Air Force
- Air Chief Marshal in the Royal Thai Air Force
- Deputy Prime Minister
- Minister of Agriculture
- Minister of Cooperatives
- Minister of Culture
- Secretary of the Ministry of Defense

Among several official visits, Luang Yuthasastr Kosol represented Thailand in Spain, Italy, Japan, Switzerland, France, Belgium, Norway, Sweden, Denmark, USA, Taiwan and Hong Kong. In 1953, Luang Yuthasastr Kosol led the Naval Parade for the Queen’s Coronation held in the United Kingdom.

== Later career ==
During his last years of service, Prayoon undertook several agricultural projects such as the creation of a secured and self-managed market by parboiled rice farmers, including increased marketing opportunities and refrigeration as well as rural reconstruction of liquid gas propane, and rubber industry. An oil refinery in cooperation with American Petroleum Export Company through the flotation of a bond issue to fund the project and the initiation of the deep-sea port in Si Racha District.

== Awards and decorations ==
- Knight Grand Cordon of the Most Exalted Order of the White Elephant
- Knight Grand Cordon of the Most Noble Order of the Crown
- Knight Grand Commander of the Most Illustrious Order of Chula Chom Klao
- Victory Medal - Franco-Thai War
- Victory Medal - Pacific War
- Safeguarding the Constitution Medal
- Medal for Service Rendered in the Interior - Pacific War
- Chakra Mala Medal
- King Rama VI Royal Cypher Medal, 5th Class
- King Rama VIII Royal Cypher Medal, 3rd Class
- King Rama IX Royal Cypher Medal, 2nd Class
- King Rama VI Rajaruchi Medal (Gold Medal)
- King Rama VI Coronation Medal
- King Rama VII Coronation Medal
- King Rama IX Coronation Medal
- Commemorative Medal on the Occasion of the 150th Years of Rattanakosin Celebration

=== Foreign honour ===
- Nazi Germany :
  - Order of the German Red Cross, Third Class
- Italy :
  - Commander of the Order of Merit of the Italian Republic
  - Commander of the Order of the Crown of Italy
- France :
  - Commander of the Legion of Honour
- Japan :
  - Order of the Sacred Treasure, Third Class
- Kingdom of Laos :
  - Grand Cross of the Order of the Million Elephants and the White Parasol
  - Grand Cross of the Order of the Reign
- Cambodia :
  - Grand Cross of the Royal Order of Sahametrei
- Burma :
  - Grand Commander of the Order of the Union of Burma - Civilian Member
- UN :
  - United Nations Service Medal Korean
