= 1949 Thai supplementary elections =

Supplementary elections were held in 19 provinces of Thailand on 5 June 1949 to elect an additional 21 members to the House of Representatives. The elections were called in order to comply with the requirement to have one representative for every 150,000 residents. At the time there were no political parties, so all candidates ran as independents.

Orapin Chaiyakan was elected in Ubon Ratchathani Province, becoming the first female member of parliament in Thailand.
