= Thawan Thamrongnawasawat =

Prime Minister of Thailand from 1946 to 1947

Rear Admiral Thawan Thamrongnawasawat MPCh MVM
- ถวัลย์ ธำรงนาวาสวัสดิ์
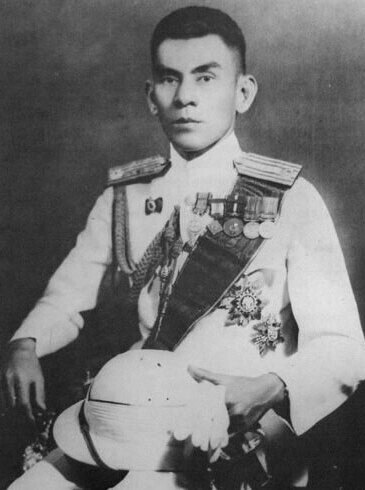
- Thawan c. 1940s

8th Prime Minister of Thailand
- In office 23 August 1946 – 8 November 1947
- Monarch: Bhumibol Adulyadej
- Preceded by: Pridi Banomyong
- Succeeded by: Khuang Aphaiwong

Minister of Justice
- In office 11 June 1946 – 8 November 1947
- Prime Minister: Pridi Banomyong; Himself
- Preceded by: Luang Chamnarnnitikaset
- Succeeded by: Seni Pramoj

Minister of Interior
- In office February 1935 – December 1938
- Prime Minister: Phraya Phahon
- Preceded by: Pridi Banomyong
- Succeeded by: Plaek Phibunsongkhram

Member of the House of Representatives from Phra Nakhon Si Ayutthaya
- In office 5 August 1946 – 8 November 1947
- Prime Minister: Pridi Banomyong; Himself
- Preceded by: Additional election

Personal details
- Born: Thawan (Note: At that time, Thais did not have surnames.); 21 November 1901 Ayutthaya, Krung Kao, Siam (now Phra Nakhon Si Ayutthaya, Phra Nakhon Si Ayutthaya, Thailand)
- Died: 3 December 1988 (aged 87) Phramongkutklao Hospital, Phaya Thai, Bangkok, Thailand (now Ratchathewi, Bangkok, Thailand)
- Party: Khana Ratsadon
- Other political affiliations: Free Thai Movement; Constitutional Front

Military service
- Allegiance: Thailand
- Branch: Royal Thai Navy
- Rank: Major General; Rear Admiral; Group Captain

Thawan Thamrongnawasawat (also spelt Thawal Thamrongnavaswadhi or Thawal Thamrongnavasawat; Thai: ถวัลย์ ธำรงนาวาสวัสดิ์, IPA: [tʰà.wǎn tʰam.roŋ.naː.waː.sà.wàt]; Chinese: 郑连淡; pinyin: Zhèng Liándàn; 21 November 1901 – 3 December 1988), also known by his noble title as Luang Thamrongnawasawat, was the eighth prime minister of Thailand from 1946 to 1947. Before becoming a politician, he was a naval officer, holding the rank of rear admiral.

== Education ==
- Ayutthaya Wittayalai School
- Debsirin School
- Chulalongkorn University
- Royal Thai Naval Academy

== Political career ==
A career naval officer of Chinese ancestry, Thamrong was a leading member of the anti-Japanese Free Thai Movement resistance movement during World War II. He became Thailand's elected prime minister on 23 August 1946, replacing Pridi Banomyong. However, he was removed from office by a military coup orchestrated by Field Marshal Plaek Phibunsongkhram on 8 November 1947. Khuang Aphaiwong then assumed the post of prime minister.

After King Rama VII abdicated the throne, Thamrong was appointed by the government to be the leader of a faculty of representatives to travel to invite Prince Ananda Mahidol, who was living in Switzerland with his mother and two siblings, to ascend to the throne as King Rama VIII of the Chakri dynasty.

However, due to political fluctuations, a coup eventually occurred originating from within a group of soldiers led by Phin Choonhavan on 8 November 1947, resulting in Thamrong having to leave the country and stay in Hong Kong for a period. When Thamrong later returned to Thailand he was appointed as a member of the Constitutional Drafting Assembly. After that, he lived a relatively quiet life.

== Death ==
Thawan Thamrongnawasawat died on 3 December 1988 at Phramongkutklao Hospital, aged 87 years, being the first and only naval officer to date who has served as prime minister.

== Academic rank ==
- 1939 Adjunct Professor of Thammasat University

== Royal decorations ==
Thawan has received the following royal decorations in the Honours System of Thailand:

- Knight Grand Cordon (Special Class) of the Most Exalted Order of the White Elephant
- Knight Grand Cordon (Special Class) of The Most Noble Order of the Crown of Thailand
- Victory Medal - World War II
- Safeguarding the Constitution Medal
- Medal for Service Rendered in the Indochina (Franco-Thai War)
- Medal for Service in the Interior - Asia (Pacific War)
- Chakrabarti Mala Medal
- King Rama VIII Royal Cypher Medal, 1st

== Notes ==
Political offices
Preceded by Luang Praditmanutham	Minister of Interior; 1935–1938	Succeeded by Luang Phibunsongkhram
Preceded by Chaophraya Sri Thammathibet	Minister of Justice; 1938–1944	Succeeded by Chaophraya Sri Thammathibet
Preceded by Luang Chamnannitikaset	Minister of Justice; 1946–1947	Succeeded by Seni Pramoj
Preceded by Pridi Banomyong	Prime Minister of Siam; 1946–1947	Vacant Phin Choonhavan (Acting) Title next held by Khuang Aphaiwong
Preceded by Seni Pramoj	Minister of Foreign Affairs; 1947	Succeeded by Atthakit Banomyong
Assembly seats
Preceded by Wiroj Kamolphan	Members of the House of Representatives for Phra Nakhon Si Ayutthaya, 1st District; 1946–1947 with Wiroj Kamolphan	District eliminated
Government offices
Preceded by Prayoon Pamornmontri	Secretary of the Cabinet of Siam; 1933–1935	Succeeded by Direk Jayanama
