= 1946 Siamese general election =

- 6 January 1946
- 96 of the 192 seats in the House of Representatives
- Turnout: 32.52% (▼2.51pp)
Party	Seats
Independents	96
This lists parties that won seats. See the complete results below.
Prime Minister before	Prime Minister after
Seni Pramoj	Khuang Aphaiwong

General elections were held in Siam on 6 January 1946 to elect 96 of the 192 members of the House of Representatives. The other 96 members were appointed by King Ananda Mahidol. Voter turnout was 33%.

At the time there were no political parties, so all candidates ran as independents.

== Results ==
Party	Votes	%	Seats
Independents			96
Royal appointees			96
Total			192
Total votes	2,091,788	–	
Registered voters/turnout	6,431,827	32.52	
Source: Nohlen et al.

== Aftermath ==
Following the promulgation of a new constitution later in 1946, the appointed seats were abolished and the number of elected seats expanded to 178. Elections were held in August 1946 to elect an additional 82 members and political parties were allowed to contest the elections for the first time. Supporters of Pridi Banomyong (Sahachip Party and the Constitutional Front) took 57 seats, the Democrat Party took 18 seats and seven seats went to unaffiliated representatives.
