= Academic ranks in Thailand =

Academic ranks are the titles, relative importance and power of professors, researchers and administrative personnel held in academia.

At higher education institutions in Thailand, teaching officers are generally called "lecturers" (อาจารย์ achan) and are collectively called "teaching staff" (คณาจารย์ khanachan), whilst administrative officers are generally called "administrators" (ผู้บริหาร phuborihan) and are collectively called "administrative staff" (คณะผู้บริหาร khana phuborihan).

Careers of teaching staff at Thai universities generally start at the level of "lecturer". At this level, contracts may be permanent or temporary, or may impose a time-limit for progression to a higher rank (similarly to a US tenure-track position). In order to achieve higher academic ranks, staff must submit to evaluation both internally (at the level of their institution) and externally (by academics from other institutions). Criteria for promotion are regulated centrally by the body which regulates universities (Office of the Higher Education Commission), meaning that there is little variation in promotion standards across institutions, irrespective of their status or orientation (e.g. research-intensive international universities vs. teaching-oriented local universities).

Progression of staff through academic ranks follows a similar dynamic to that in Australia, with the highest rank of Professor awarded selectively to leading scholars. Thus, compared to higher education institutions in countries such as the US, where Associate Professor is regarded as a mid-career rank and an intermediate step before Professorship, holders of Associate Professorships are regarded as senior members of academic staff at Thai universities, comparable to Readers at many Commonwealth institutions.

== Academic ranks ==
=== Professors ===
Full names			Acronyms
English	Thai	Romanised (RTGS)	Acronyms
Regular officers
Professor	ศาสตราจารย์	Sattrachan	ศ.
Clinical Professor	ศาสตราจารย์คลินิก	Sattrachan Khlinik	ศ. คลินิก
Clinical Professor Emeritus	ศาสตราจารย์คลินิกเกียรติคุณ	Sattrachan Khlinik Kiattikhun	ศ.คลินิกเกียรติคุณ
Professor Emeritus	ศาสตราจารย์กิตติคุณ or ศาสตราจารย์เกียรติคุณ	Sattrachan Kittikhun or Sattrachan Kiattikhun	ศ. กิตติคุณ or ศ. (เกียรติคุณ)
Irregular officers
Adjunct Professor	ศาสตราจารย์วุฒิคุณ or ศาสตราจารย์พิเศษ	Sattrachan Wutthikhun or Sattrachan Phiset	None or ศ. (พิเศษ)
Chair Professor	ศาสตราจารย์เกียรติยศ, ศาสตรเมธาจารย์ or ศาสตราจารย์อาวุโส	Sattrachan Kiattiyot, Sattramethachan or Sattrachan Awuso	None
Distinguished Professor	ศาสตราจารย์พิศิษฐ์	Sattrachan Phisit	None
Honorary Professor	ศาสตราจารย์กิตติมศักดิ์	Sattrachan Kittimasak	None
Named Professor	ศาสตราภิชาน	Sattraphichan	None
Research Professor	กิตติเมธี	Kittimethi	None
Visiting Professor	ศาสตราจารย์รับเชิญ or ศาสตราจารย์อาคันตุกะ	Sattrachan Rap Choen or Sattrachan Akhantuka	None

=== Others ===
Full names			Acronyms
English	Thai	Romanised (RTGS)	Acronyms
Regular officers
Associate Professor	รองศาสตราจารย์	Rong Sattrachan	รศ.
Assistant Professor	ผู้ช่วยศาสตราจารย์	Phuchuai Sattrachan	ผศ.
Lecturer	อาจารย์	Achan	อ.
Irregular officers
Adjunct Associate Professor	รองศาสตราจารย์วุฒิคุณ or รองศาสตราจารย์พิเศษ	Rong Sattrachan Wutthikhun or Rong Sattrachan Phiset	None or รศ. (พิเศษ)
Adjunct Assistant Professor	ผู้ช่วยศาสตราจารย์วุฒิคุณ or ผู้ช่วยศาสตราจารย์พิเศษ	Phuchuai Sattrachan Wutthikhun or Phuchuai Sattrachan Phiset	None or ผศ. (พิเศษ)
Adjunct Instructor	อาจารย์พิเศษ	Achan Phiset	อ. (พิเศษ)
Visiting Associate Professor	รองศาสตราจารย์อาคันตุกะ	Rong Sattrachan Akhantuka	None
Visiting Assistant Professor	ผู้ช่วยศาสตราจารย์อาคันตุกะ	Phuchuai Sattrachan Akhantuka	None

== Administrative ranks ==
Full names			Note
English	Thai	Romanised (RTGS)	Note
Administrators
Chancellor	ผู้ประศาสน์การ	Phuprasatkan	Chief of a university. A historical office, only used by Thammasat University and now replaced by "Rector" (อธิการบดี).
Commander	ผู้บัญชาการ	Phubanchakan	Chief of a university. A historical office, only used by Chulalongkorn University and now replaced by "President" (อธิการบดี).
Director	ผู้อำนวยการ	Phu-amnuaikan	Chief of an independent centre or institute.
President or Rector	อธิการบดี	Athikanbodi	Chief of a university.
President or Rector	อธิการ	Athikan	Chief of an independent college. The term is also used as a shortened spoken form of อธิการบดี in universities.
Secretary General	เลขาธิการ	Lekhathikan	Chief of an independent centre or institute.
Lower administrators
Dean	คณบดี	Khanabodi	Chief of a faculty or college in an institution.
Director	ผู้อำนวยการ	Phu-amnuaikan	Chief of a bureau, centre, institute or office in an institution.
Head	หัวหน้า	Hua-na	Chief of a department, division or section in an institution.
Secretary	เลขานุการ	Lekhanukan	Chief administrative officer of any entity in an institution.
Note: 1. A deputy or vice office has an additional word, "รอง" (Rong), in its name. For example, "Deputy Dean" is "รองคณบดี" (Rong Khanabodi).; 2. An assistant office has an additional word, "ผู้ช่วย" (Phuchuai), in its name. For instance, "Assistant Dean" is "ผู้ช่วยคณบดี" (Phuchuai Khanabodi).
