= Phin Choonhavan =

Thai military officer

Field Marshal Phin Choonhavan KGC MPCh MVM
- ผิน ชุณหะวัณ
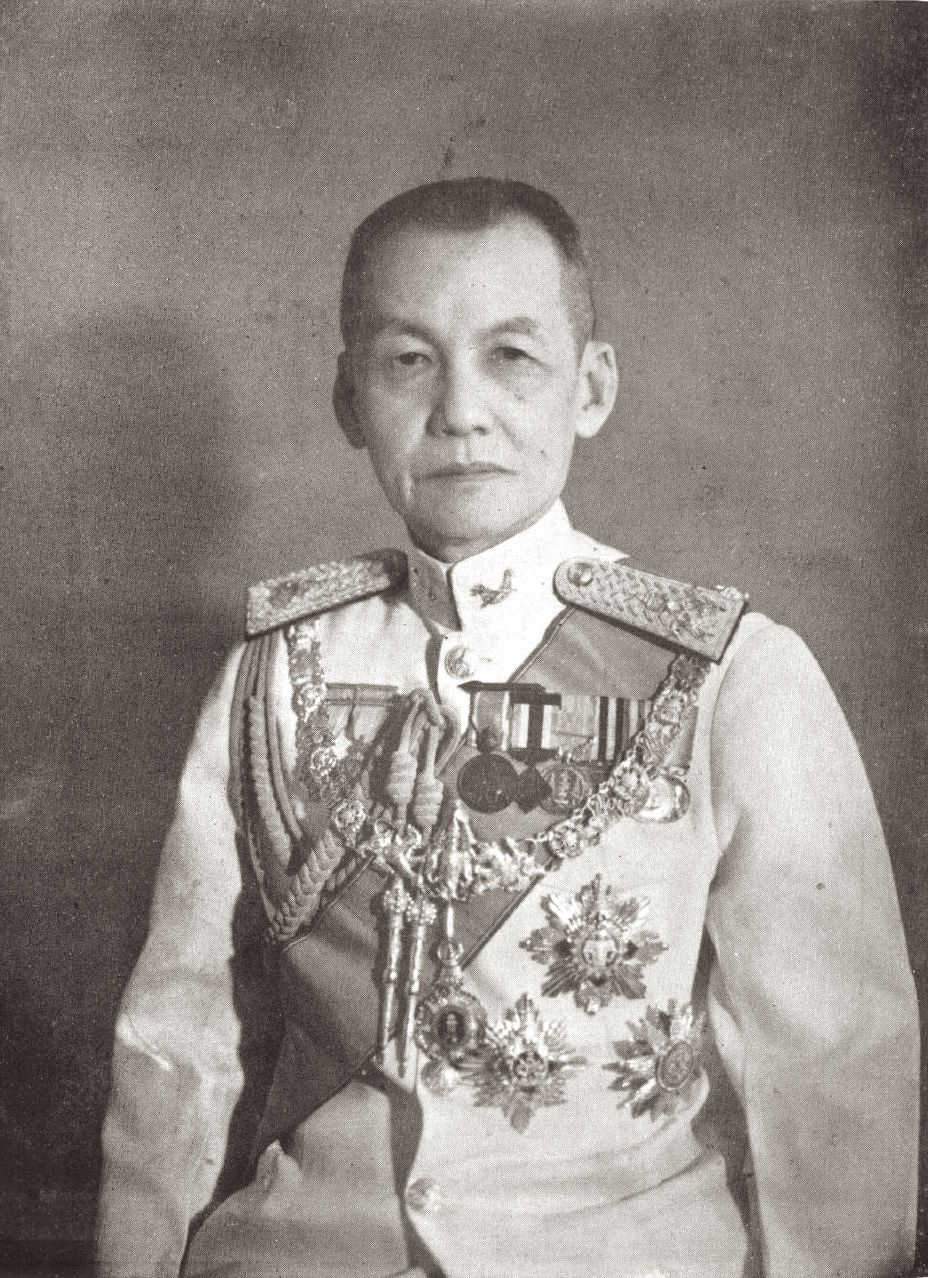
- Choonhavan in 1953

Head of the National Military Council De facto Acting Prime Minister of Thailand
- In office 8 November 1947 – 10 November 1947
- Monarch: Bhumibol Adulyadej
- Preceded by: Thawan Thamrongnawasawat (Prime Minister)
- Succeeded by: Khuang Aphaiwong (Prime Minister)

Deputy Prime Minister of Thailand
- In office 6 December 1951 – 19 April 1956 Serving with Muni Mahasantana Wechayantrangsarit; Boonkerd Sutantanon; Fuen Ronnaphagrad Ritthakhanee
- Prime Minister: Plaek Phibunsongkhram
- Preceded by: Sawat Sawatranachai Sawatdikiat
- Succeeded by: Fuen Ronnaphagrad Ritthakhanee; Prayoon Yuthasastrkosol

Minister of Agriculture
- In office 12 December 1953 – 16 September 1957
- Prime Minister: Plaek Phibunsongkhram
- Preceded by: Pisan Sunavinvivat
- Succeeded by: Wiboon Thambutra

15th Commander-in-chief of the Royal Thai Army
- In office 28 May 1948 – 23 May 1954
- Preceded by: Adul Aduldejaraj
- Succeeded by: Sarit Thanarat

Personal details
- Born: Phin (Note: At that time, Thais did not have surnames.); 14 August 1891 Si Muen, Ratchaburi, Siam (now Bang Khonthi, Samut Songkhram, Thailand)
- Died: 26 January 1973 (aged 81) Phramongkutklao Hospital, Phaya Thai, Bangkok, Thailand (now Ratchathewi, Bangkok, Thailand)
- Children: 6, including Chatichai
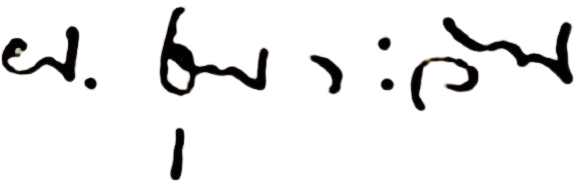
- Signature

Military service
- Allegiance: Thailand
- Branch/service: Royal Thai Army
- Rank: Field Marshal; Admiral; Air Chief Marshal
- Commands: 3rd infantry division Phayap Army; Commander-in-chief of the Royal Thai Army
- Battles/wars: Boworadet Rebellion; World War II; Franco-Thai War; Burma Campaign
- Other work: Military Governor of the Shan States (1943)

Phin Choonhavan (Thai: ผิน ชุณหะวัณ; RTGS: Phin Chunhawan; 14 August 1891 – 26 January 1973) was a Thai military leader and Deputy Prime Minister of Thailand. Phin was a leader of several coups against the government, most notably the 1947 coup. During the Second World War, he commanded the Phayap Army's 3rd Division before being made military governor of the Shan States, which Thailand had occupied during the Burma Campaign.

Phin was the son of a Chinese physician, Kai (Chinese: 開) who migrated to Siam from Chaoshan, as was the father of his wife, Lim Hong (Chinese: 林風), who was also an immigrant from Chenghai Shantou. His son, Chatichai Choonhavan, became Prime Minister of Thailand, while his daughter, Udomlak, married Phao Siyanon, director general of the Thai police. Another daughter, Charoen, married Pramarn Adireksarn, who served as deputy prime minister in several governments.

== Honours ==
=== National honours ===
- Knight Grand Cross of the Order of Chula Chom Klao
- Knight Grand Cordon of the Order of the White Elephant
- Knight Grand Cordon of The Order of the Crown of Thailand
- Victory Medal - Franco-Thai War
- Victory Medal - World War II
- Safeguarding the Constitution Medal
- Medal for Service Rendered in the Interior
- Chakra Mala Medal
- King Rama VIII Royal Cypher Medal, Second Class
- King Rama IX Royal Cypher Medal, First Class
- King Rama VI Coronation Medal
- King Rama VII Coronation Medal
- King Rama IX Coronation Medal
- 150 Years Commemoration of Bangkok Medal
- 25th Buddhist Century Celebration Medal

=== Foreign honours ===
- Kingdom of Laos :
  - Grand Cross of the Order of the Million Elephants and the White Parasol
- United States :
  - Commander of the Legion of Merit
- Myanmar :
  - Grand Commander of the Order of Thiri Thudhamma
