= Plaek Phibunsongkhram =

Fascist Prime Minister of Thailand (1938–1944; 1948–1957)

Field Marshal Plaek Phibunsongkhram NR RV PCh MPCh MVM
- แปลก พิบูลสงคราม
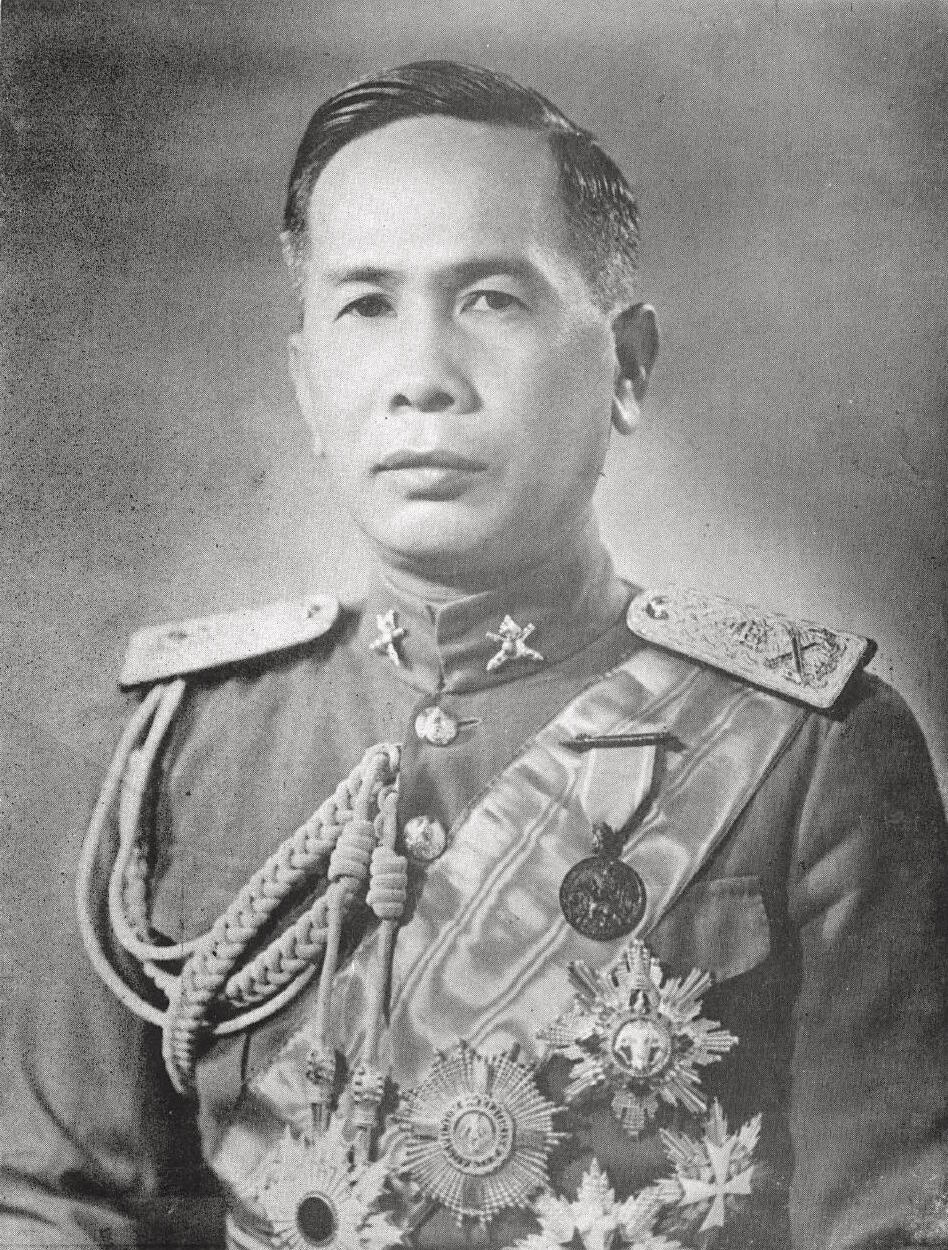
- Official portrait, c. 1940s

3rd Prime Minister of Thailand
- In office 8 April 1948 – 16 September 1957
- Monarch: Bhumibol Adulyadej
- Deputy: See list: Fuen Ronnaphagrad Ritthakhanee; Prayoon Yuthasastrkosol; Nai Vorakarnbancha; Phin Choonhavan; Sawat Sawatronnachai Sawatdikiat; Munee Mahasanthana Vejayantarangsarit
- Preceded by: Khuang Aphaiwong
- Succeeded by: Sarit Thanarat (de facto); Pote Sarasin
- In office 16 December 1938 – 1 August 1944
- Monarch: Ananda Mahidol
- Deputy: See list: Adun Adundetcharat; Chuang Chawengsaksongkhram
- Preceded by: Phraya Phahonphonphayuhasena
- Succeeded by: Khuang Aphaiwong
Ministerial offices
Minister of Defence
In office 12 September 1957 – 16 September 1957
Prime Minister	Himself
Preceded by	Sarit Thanarat
Succeeded by	Thanom Kittikachorn
In office 28 June 1949 – 21 March 1957
Prime Minister	Himself
Preceded by	Suk Chatnakrob
Succeeded by	Sarit Thanarat
In office 15 December 1941 – 15 November 1943
Prime Minister	Himself
Preceded by	Mangkorn Phromyothi
Succeeded by	Phichit Kriangsakphichit
In office 22 September 1934 – 19 August 1941
Prime Minister	Himself
Preceded by	Phraya Phahonphonphayuhasena
Succeeded by	Mangkorn Phromyothi
Minister of Cooperatives
In office 12 September 1957 – 16 September 1957
Prime Minister	Himself
Preceded by	Siri Siriyothin
Succeeded by	Wiboon Thammaboot
Minister of Interior
In office 2 August 1955 – 21 March 1957
Prime Minister	Himself
Preceded by	Pisan Sunavinvivat
Succeeded by	Phao Siyanon
In office 15 April 1948 – 25 June 1949
Prime Minister	Himself
Preceded by	Khuang Aphaiwong
Succeeded by	Mangkorn Phromyothi
In office 21 December 1938 – 22 August 1941
Prime Minister	Himself
Preceded by	Thawan Thamrongnawasawat
Succeeded by	Chuang Kwancherd
Minister of Commerce
In office 4 February 1954 – 23 March 1954
Prime Minister	Himself
Preceded by	Boonkerd Sutantanon
Succeeded by	Siri Siriyothin
Minister of Culture
In office 24 March 1952 – 2 August 1955
Prime Minister	Himself
Preceded by	Position established
Succeeded by	Pisan Sunavinvivat
Minister of Finance
In office 13 October 1949 – 18 July 1950
Prime Minister	Himself
Preceded by	Vivadhanajaya
Succeeded by	Chom Jamornmarn
Minister of Foreign Affairs
In office 28 June 1949 – 13 October 1949
Prime Minister	Himself
Preceded by	Mom Chao Pridithepphong Devakula
Succeeded by	Pote Sarasin
In office 15 December 1941 – 19 June 1942
Prime Minister	Himself
Preceded by	Direk Jayanama
Succeeded by	Luang Wichitwathakan
In office 14 July 1939 – 22 August 1941
Prime Minister	Himself
Preceded by	Jit Na Songkhla
Succeeded by	Direk Jayanama
Minister of Education
In office 16 February 1942 – 7 March 1942
Prime Minister	Himself
Preceded by	Sindhu Kamolnavin
Succeeded by	Prayoon Pamornmontri
Military offices
Supreme Commander of the Armed Forces
In office 13 November 1940 – 24 November 1943
Preceded by	Position established
Succeeded by	Sarit Thanarat
Commander-in-Chief of the Royal Thai Army
In office 9 November 1947 – 15 May 1948
Preceded by	Adun Adundetcharat
Succeeded by	Phin Choonhavan
In office 4 January 1938 – 5 August 1944
Preceded by	Phraya Phahonphonphayuhasena
Succeeded by	Phichit Kriangsakphichit

Personal details
- Born: Plaek (Note: At that time, Thais did not have surnames.); 14 July 1897 Nonthaburi, Kingdom of Siam (now Thailand)
- Died: 11 June 1964 (aged 66) Sagamihara, Japan
- Party: Seri Manangkhasila Party
- Other political affiliations: Khana Ratsadon (1927–1954)
- Spouse: La-iad Bhandhukravi
- Domestic partners: Pisamai Vilaisak; Khamnuengnit Phibunsongkhram
- Children: 6, including Nitya
- Relatives: Krissanapoom Pibulsonggram (great-grandson)

Military service
- Allegiance: Kingdom of Siam (1914–1939); Kingdom of Thailand (1939–1957)
- Branch/service: Royal Thai Army
- Rank: Field Marshal; Admiral of the Fleet; Marshal of the Air Force
- Commands: Royal Thai Armed Forces; Royal Thai Army; Royal Thai Navy; Royal Thai Air Force
- Battles/wars: See list: Siamese Revolution; Boworadet Rebellion; World War II; Franco-Thai War; Pacific War; Palace Rebellion

Plaek Phibunsongkhram (Note: Thai: แปลก พิบูลสงคราม, pronounced [plɛ̀ːk pʰí.būːn.sǒŋ.kʰrāːm]) (14 July 1897 – 11 June 1964), commonly known in English language sources as Phibun and as Chomphon Por (Note: Thai: จอมพล ป., lit. 'Marshal P.') in Thai, was a Thai military officer and politician who served as the third prime minister of Thailand from 1938 to 1944 and again from 1948 to 1957. He rose to power as a leading member of the Khana Ratsadon, becoming prime minister in 1938 and later consolidating his influence as a military dictator. His regime allied with the Empire of Japan during World War II, and his administration was marked by authoritarian policies and the promotion of Thai nationalism. He was closely involved in both domestic reforms and foreign policy during the war and played a central role in shaping modern Thai state ideology. Phibun's ideology has been described as fascist.

Born in Nonthaburi, Phibun graduated from the Royal Military Academy in 1914 before continuing his studies in France. After returning to Siam, he became involved in the Khana Ratsadon, a group that led the 1932 Siamese Revolution, which replaced the country's absolute monarchy with a constitutional monarchy. Phibun emerged as a prominent military figure following the revolution, gradually consolidating power within the armed forces.

In 1938, Phibun became prime minister while serving as Commander of the Royal Siamese Army. Inspired by the Italian leader Benito Mussolini, his government established an authoritarian regime run along fascist lines, and launched a series of cultural mandates aimed at modernizing Thai society. These policies included changing the country's name from "Siam" to "Thailand", promoting Western-style dress, emphasizing the Thai language, and encouraging Thai nationalism and Sinophobia. During World War II, Phibun aligned Thailand with Imperial Japan, allowing Japanese forces to pass through Thai territory and later declaring war on the Allies. This alliance was controversial and led to internal resistance, most notably the Free Thai Movement and Regent Pridi Banomyong, a former associate within the Khana Ratsadon. As the war progressed and Japan's position weakened, Phibun lost political support and was forced to resign by the National Assembly in 1944. Following the war, he faced accusations of war crimes, though he was later acquitted.

Phibun returned to power in 1948 through a military-backed coup and ruled during the early Cold War period. His second premiership adopted a strongly anti-communist stance and aligned Thailand closely with the United States. Despite economic development and continued modernization efforts, his government was plagued by political instability and several attempts to launch a coup against him were made, including the Army General Staff plot (1948), the Palace Rebellion (1949), and the Manhattan Rebellion (1951). Phibun attempted to transform Thailand into an electoral democracy from the mid-1950s onward, but he was overthrown by his subordinate Sarit Thanarat during a coup in 1957 and went into exile in Japan until his death in 1964. His legacy remains contested, as he is viewed both as a modernizer and as a symbol of military authoritarianism in Thai political history.

== Early years ==
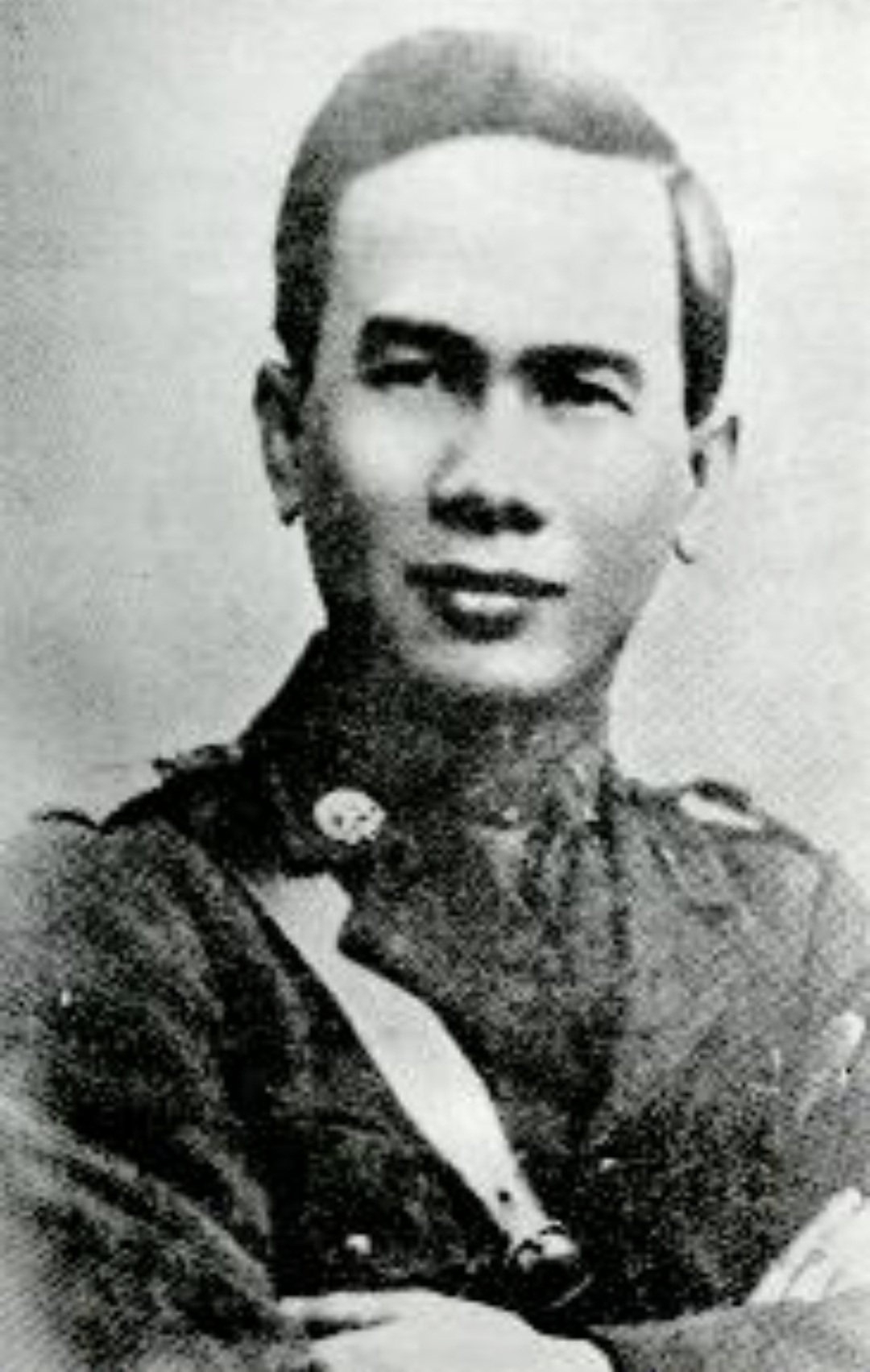
Phibun in his youth

Phibun was born Plaek on 14 July 1897 in Mueang Nonthaburi, Nonthaburi Province, in the Kingdom of Siam to durian farmers. His family began using the surname Khittasangkha (Thai: ขีตตะสังคะ) after a 1913 decree on surnames.

He received his given name – meaning "strange" or "weird" in English – because of his unusual appearance as a child where his ears were positioned below his eyes, rather than above his eyes like his peers.

Plaek's paternal grandfather was a Chinese immigrant from Guangdong of Cantonese descent. However, the family was completely assimilated, being considered Central Thai people, since most of the Chinese in Thailand are from the Teochew dialect group, Plaek did not pass the criteria for being considered Chinese as well, enabling him to successfully conceal and deny his Chinese roots.

He studied in Buddhist temples before joining the Royal Military Academy; upon graduation in 1914, he was commissioned into the Royal Siamese Army as a second lieutenant in the artillery. Following World War I, he was sent to France to study artillery tactics at the École d'application d'artillerie. In 1928, as he rose in rank, he received the noble title Luang from King Prajadhipok, and became known as Luang Phibunsongkhram. He would later drop his Luang title but permanently adopted Phibunsongkhram as his surname.

=== 1932 revolution ===
In 1932, Phibun was one of the leaders of the Royal Siamese Army branch of the People's Party (Khana Ratsadon), a political organization that staged a coup d'état which overthrew Siam's absolute monarchy and replaced it with a constitutional monarchy. Phibun, at the time a lieutenant colonel, quickly rose to prominence in the military as a "man-on-horseback". The 1932 coup was followed by the nationalization of several companies and increased state control of the economy.

The following year, Phibun and his military allies successfully crushed the Boworadet Rebellion, a royalist revolt led by Prince Boworadet. The new king, Ananda Mahidol, was still a child studying in Switzerland, and the Parliament appointed Colonel Prince Anuwatjaturong, Lieutenant Commander Prince Aditya Dibabha, and Chao Phraya Yommaraj (Pun Sukhum) as his regents.

== Prime Minister of Thailand (1938–1944, 1948–1957) ==
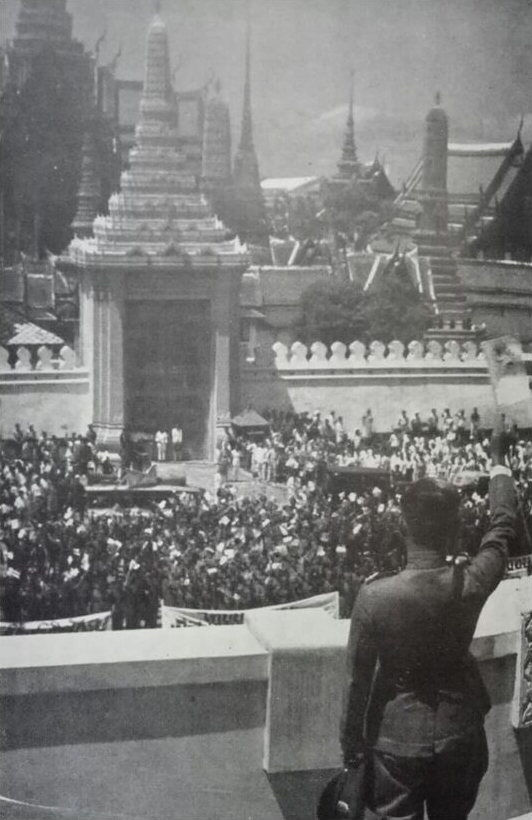
Phibunsongkhram giving a nationalist speech to the crowds at the Ministry of Defence opposite Swasti Sopha gate of Grand Palace in 1940

=== First premiership (1938–1944) ===
On 16 December 1938, Phibun replaced Phraya Phahon as Prime Minister of Thailand and as the Commander of the Royal Siamese Army. Phibun became a de facto dictator, and established a military dictatorship, consolidating his position by rewarding several members of his own army clique with influential positions in his government.

After the revolution of 1932, the Thai government of Phraya Phahol was impressed by the success of the March on Rome of Benito Mussolini's Italian fascist movement. Phibun, also an admirer of Italian fascism, sought to replicate fascist-style propaganda tactics, valued in Italy as one of the most powerful propaganda instruments of political power. In Italy, its main purpose was to promote nationalism and militarism, strengthen the unity and harmony of the state, and glorify the policy of ruralisation in Italy and abroad. As a consequence of the fascist leanings of Thai political leaders, Italian propaganda films including newsreels, documentaries, short films, and full-length feature films, such as Istituto Luce Cinecittà, were shown in Thailand during the interwar period. Phibun adopted the fascist salute, modelled on the Roman salute, using it during speeches. The salute was not compulsory in Thailand, and it was opposed by Luang Wichitwathakan and many cabinet members as they believed it inappropriate for Thai culture. Together with Wichitwathakan, the Minister of Propaganda, he built a leadership cult in 1938 and thereafter. Photographs of Phibun were to be found everywhere, and those of the abdicated King Prajadhipok were banned. His quotes appeared in newspapers, were plastered on billboards, and were repeated over the radio.

==== Thai Cultural Revolution ====
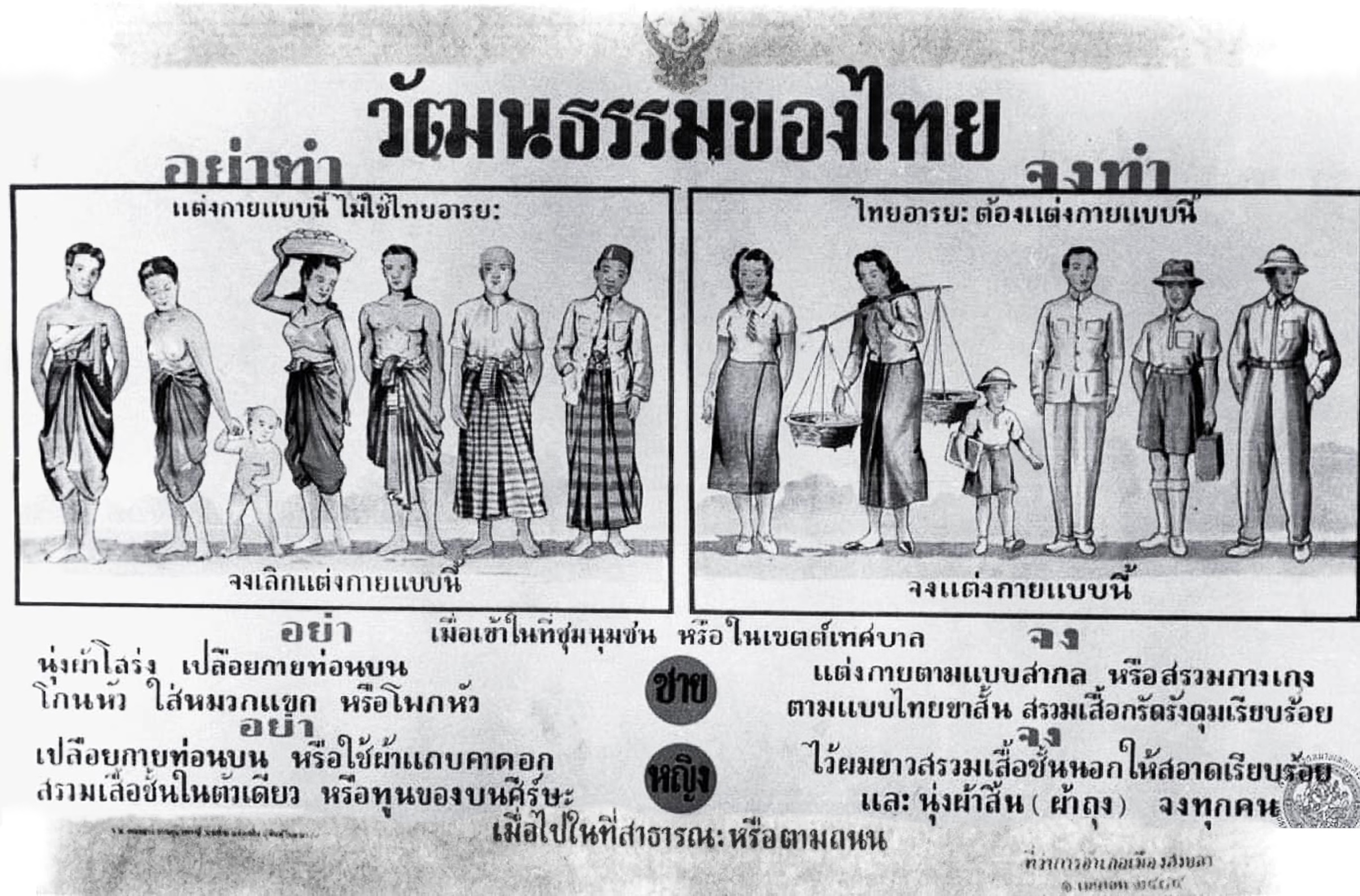
Thai poster from the Phibunsongkhram era, showing prohibited "uncivilised" dress on the left and proper Western-style dress on the right

Phibun immediately promoted Thai nationalism (to the point of ultranationalism), and to support this policy, he launched a series of major reforms, known as the Thai Cultural Revolution, to increase the pace of modernisation in Thailand. His goal aimed to uplift the national spirit and moral code of the nation and instil progressive tendencies and a newness into Thai life. A series of cultural mandates were issued by the government, which encouraged all Thais to salute the flag in public places, learn the new national anthem and use the standardised Thai language (not regional dialects or languages). People were encouraged to adopt Western-style attire as opposed to traditional clothing styles, and eat with Western-style utensils, such as forks and spoons, rather than with their hands as was customary in Thai culture at the time. Phibun saw these policies as necessary, in the interest of progressivism, to change Thailand's international image from that of an undeveloped country into a civilized and modern nation.

Phibun's administration encouraged economic nationalism and espoused staunch anti-Teochew sentiment. Sinophobic policies were imposed by the government to reduce the economic power of Siam's Teochew-Hoklo population and encouraged the Central Thai people to purchase as many Thai products as possible. In a speech in 1938, Luang Wichitwathakan, himself of one-quarter Chinese ancestry, followed Rama VI's book Jews of the East in comparing the Teochew in Siam to the Jews in Germany, who at the time were harshly repressed.

On 24 June 1939, Phibun changed the country's official English name from "Siam" to "Thailand" at Wichitwathakan's urging. The name "Siam" was an exonym of unknown and probably foreign origin, which conflicted with Phibun's nationalist policies.

In 1941, in the midst of World War II, Phibun decreed 1 January as the official start of the new year instead of the traditional Songkran date on 13 April.

==== Franco-Thai War ====
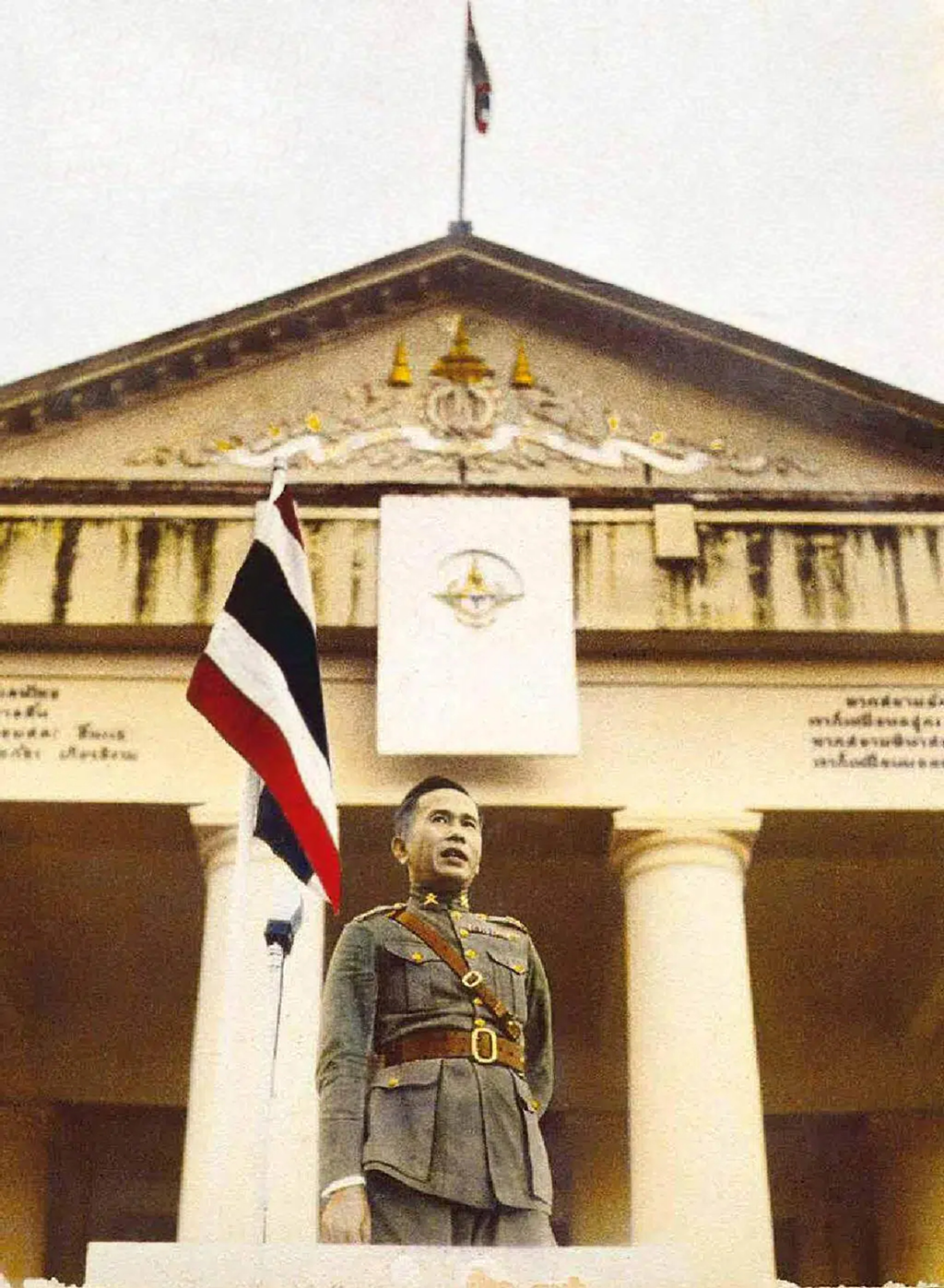
Phibunsongkhram speech at Ministry of Defence demanding the return of French Indochina from France, 8 Oct 1940

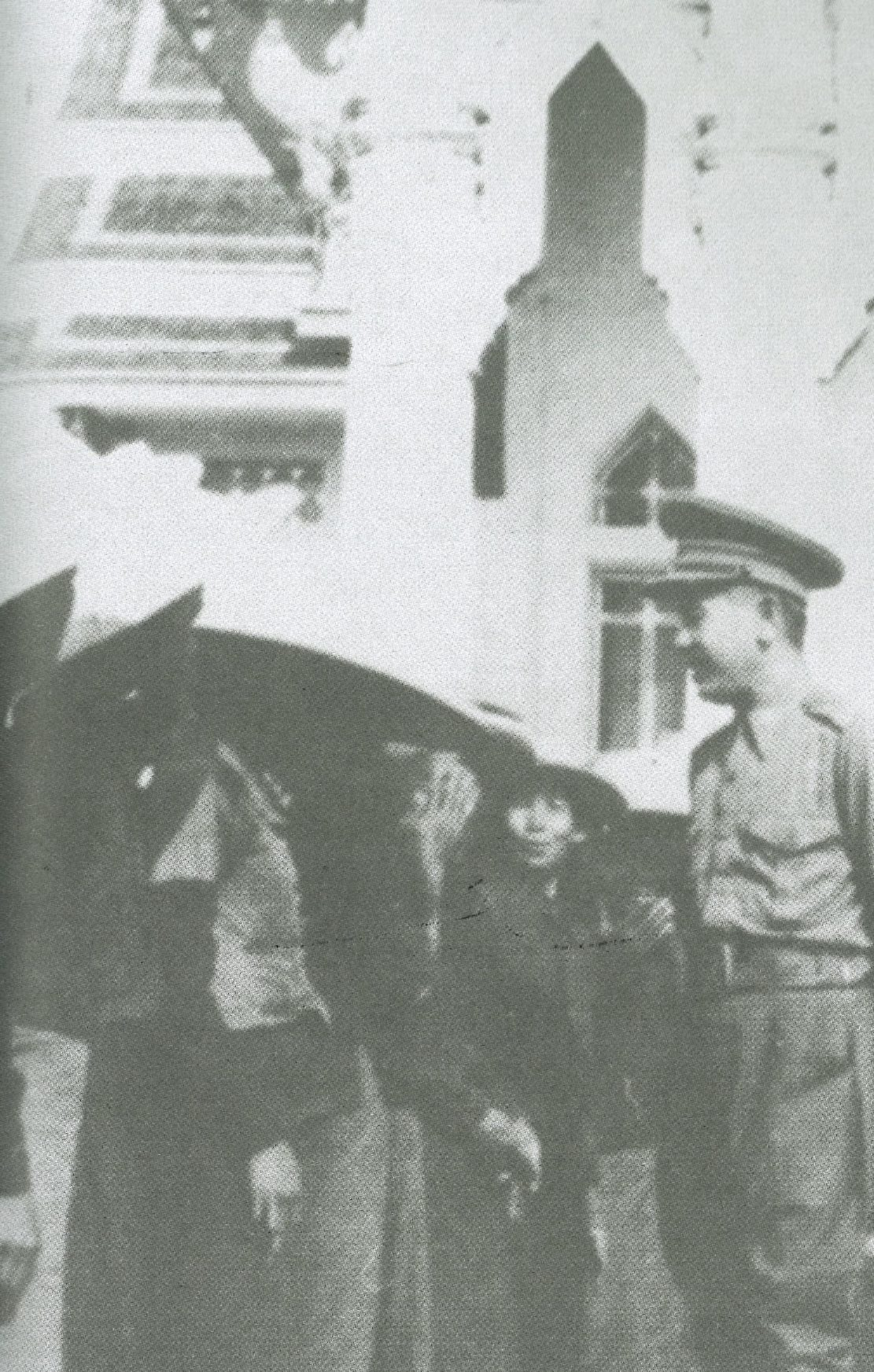
Phibunsongkhram with Thai farmers in 1942 at Bang Khen

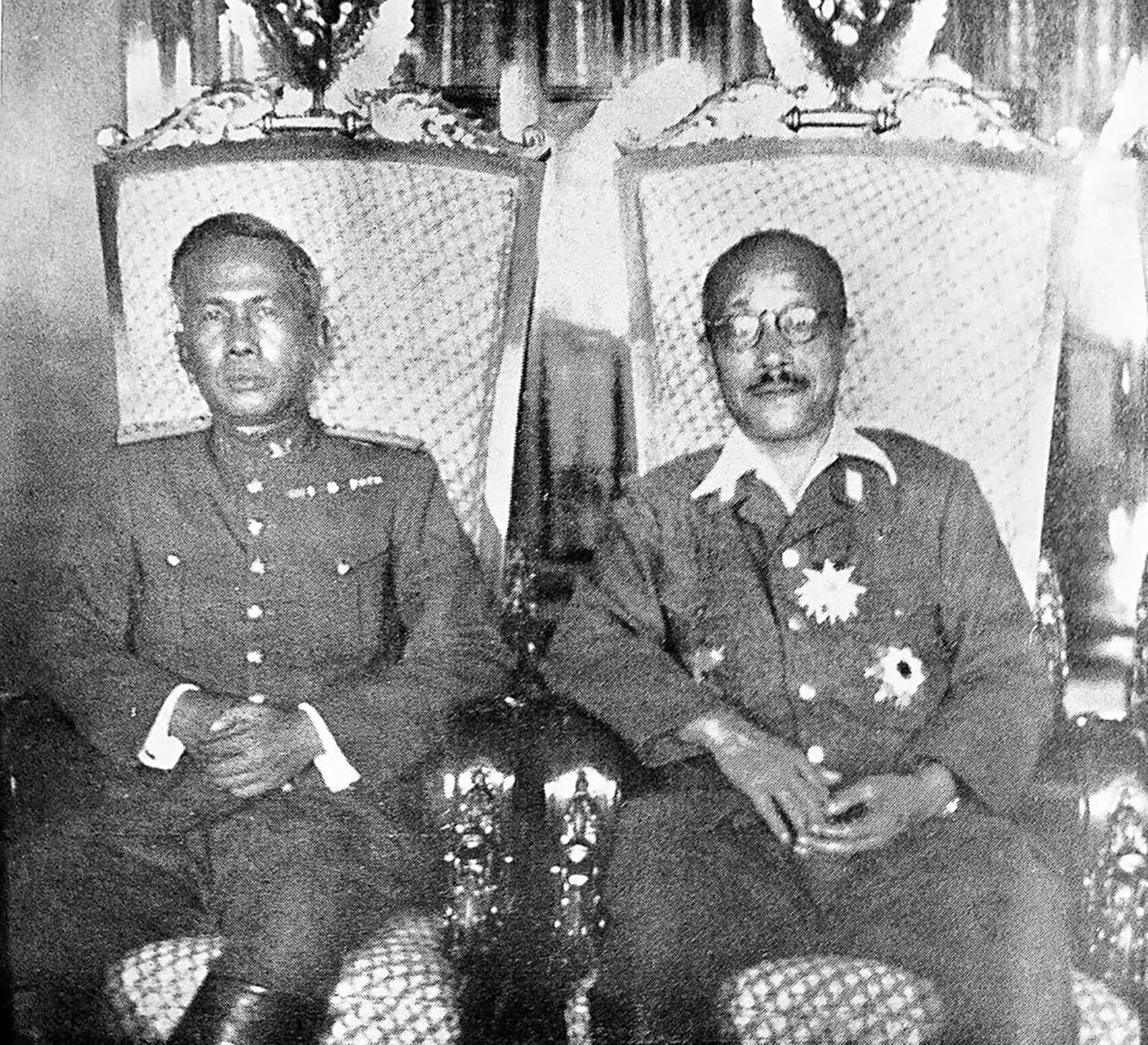
Plaek Phibun with Hideki Tojo in Bangkok on 6 July 1943

Phibun exploited the Fall of France in June 1940 and the Japanese invasion of French Indochina in September 1940 to advance Thai interests in French Indochina following a border dispute with France. Phibun believed Thailand could recover territories ceded to France by King Rama V because the French would avoid armed confrontation or offer serious resistance. Thailand fought against Vichy France over the disputed areas from October 1940 to May 1941. The technologically and numerically superior Thai force invaded French Indochina and attacked military targets in major cities. Despite Thai successes, the French tactical victory at the Battle of Ko Chang prompted intervention from the Japanese, who mediated an armistice where the French were forced to cede the disputed territories to Thailand.

==== Alliance with Japan ====
Phibun and the Thai public viewed the outcome of the Franco-Thai War as a victory, but it resulted in the rapidly expanding Japanese gaining the right to occupy French Indochina. Although Phibun was ardently pro-Japanese, he now shared a border with them and felt threatened by a potential Japanese invasion. Phibun's administration also realised that Thailand would have to fend for itself if a Japanese invasion came, considering its deteriorating relationships with Western powers in the area.

When the Japanese invaded Thailand on 8 December 1941, (because of the International Date Line this occurred an hour and a half before the attack on Pearl Harbor), Phibun was reluctantly forced to order a general ceasefire after just one day of resistance and allow the Japanese armies to use the country as a base for their invasions of the British colonies of Burma and Malaya. Hesitancy, however, gave way to enthusiasm after the Japanese rolled through the Malayan Campaign in a "Bicycle Blitzkrieg" with surprisingly little resistance. On 21 December Phibun signed a military alliance with Japan. The following month, on 25 January 1942, Phibun declared war on Britain and the United States. South Africa and New Zealand declared war on Thailand on the same day. Australia followed soon after. Phibun purged all who opposed the Japanese alliance from his government. Pridi Banomyong was appointed acting regent for the absent King Ananda Mahidol, while Direk Jayanama, the prominent foreign minister who had advocated continued resistance against the Japanese, was later sent to Tokyo as an ambassador. The United States considered Thailand to be a puppet state of Japan and refused to declare war on it. When the Allies were victorious, the United States blocked British efforts to impose a punitive peace.

==== Removal ====
In 1944, as the Japanese neared defeat and the underground anti-Japanese Free Thai Movement steadily grew in strength, the National Assembly ousted Phibun as prime minister and his six-year reign as the military commander-in-chief came to an end. Phibun's resignation was partly forced by two grandiose plans: one was to relocate the capital from Bangkok to a remote site in the jungle near Phetchabun in north central Thailand, and another was to build a "Buddhist city" in Saraburi. As early as 1939, his government had been looking to relocate the capital to Lopburi, and then to Saraburi before settling on Phetchabun. Announced at a time of severe economic difficulty, these ideas turned many government officers against him. After his resignation, Phibun went to stay at the army headquarters in Lopburi.

Khuang Aphaiwong replaced Phibun as prime minister, ostensibly to continue relations with the Japanese, but, in reality, to secretly assist the Free Thai Movement. At the war's end, Phibun was put on trial at Allied insistence on charges of having committed war crimes, mainly that of collaborating with the Axis powers. However, he was acquitted amid intense pressure as public opinion was still favourable to him, as he was thought to have done his best to protect Thai interests. Phibun's alliance with Japan had Thailand take advantage of Japanese support to expand Thai territory into Malaya and Burma.

=== Second premiership (1948–1957) ===
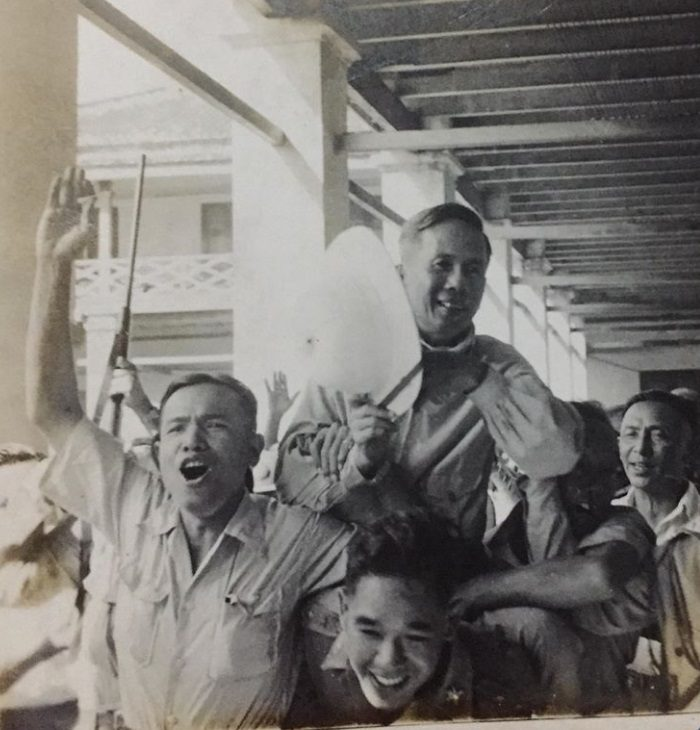
Phibun coming back to Thai politics, led the junta in 1947 after the coup

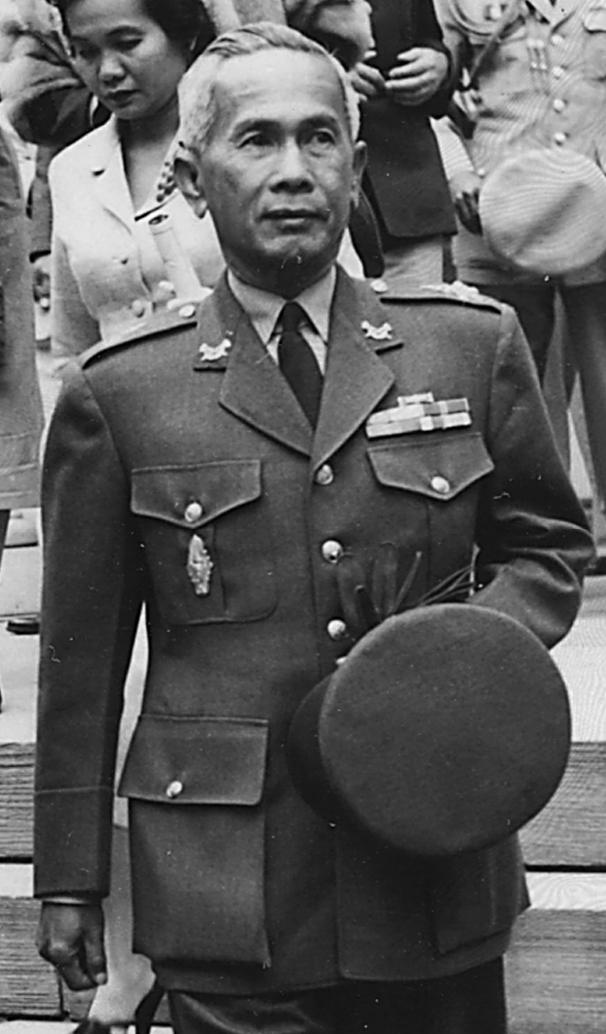
Plaek Phibunsongkhram at Hyde Park, New York, 1955

In November 1947, Royal Thai Army units under the control of Phibun known as the Coup Group carried out the 1947 Thai coup d'état which forced then-Prime Minister Thawan Thamrongnawasawat to resign. The rebels installed Khuang Aphaiwong again as prime minister as the military coup risked international disapproval. Pridi Phanomyong was persecuted but was aided by British and US intelligence officers, and thus managed to escape the country. On 8 April 1948, Phibun assumed the position of Prime Minister after the military forced Khuang out of office.

Phibun's second premiership was notably different, abandoning the fascist styling and rhetoric that characterised his first premiership, and instead promoted a façade of democracy. The beginning of the Cold War saw Phibun align Thailand with the anti-communist camp.

Phibun supported UN action in the Korean War and dispatched an expeditionary force of 4,000 troops. and received large quantities of US aid following Thailand's entry into the Korean War as part of the United Nations Command's multi-national allied force against the communist forces of North Korea and the People's Republic of China. Phibun's anti-Chinese campaign was resumed, with the government restricting Chinese immigration and undertaking various measures to restrict economic domination of the Thai market by those of Chinese descent. Chinese schools and associations were once again shut down. Despite open pro-Western and anti-Chinese policies, in the late 1950s Phibun arranged to send two of the children of Sang Phathanothai, his closest advisor, to China with the intention of establishing a backdoor channel for dialogue between China and Thailand. Sirin Phathanothai, aged eight, and her brother, aged twelve, were sent to be brought up under the assistants of Premier Zhou Enlai as his wards. Sirin later wrote The Dragon's Pearl, an autobiography telling her experiences growing up in the 1950s and 1960s among the leaders of China.

Phibun was reportedly thrilled by the democracy and freedom of speech he had witnessed during a long trip abroad to the United States and Europe in 1955. Following the example of Hyde Park in London, he set up a "Speakers' Corner" at the Sanam Luang in Bangkok. Phibun began to democratize Thailand by allowing the formation of new political parties, amnestied political opponents, and planned free elections. Phibun founded and became chairman of his own new political party, the Seri Manangkhasila Party, which was dominated by the most influential in the military and the government. The Employment Act of January 1957 legalized trade unions, limited weekly working hours, regulated holidays and overtime, and instituted health and safety regulations. The International Workers' Day became a public holiday.

==== Power play ====
Thai Triumvirate, 1947–1957

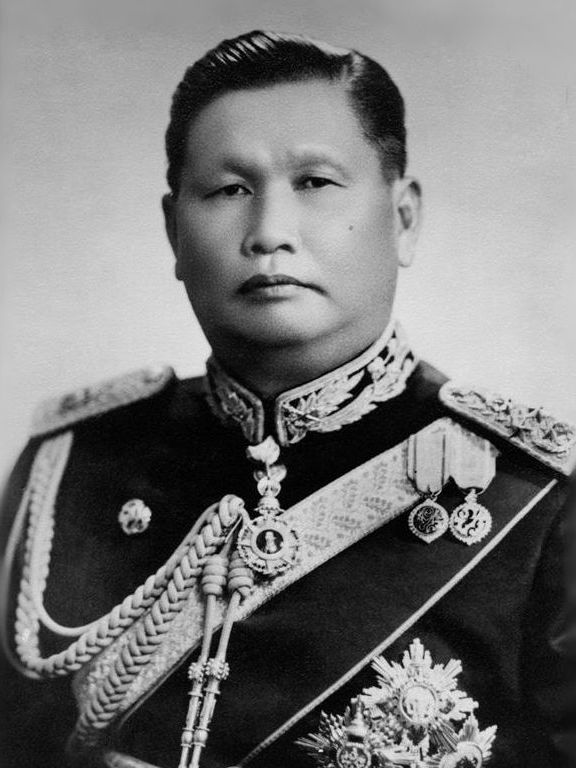
Field Marshal
Sarit Thanarat

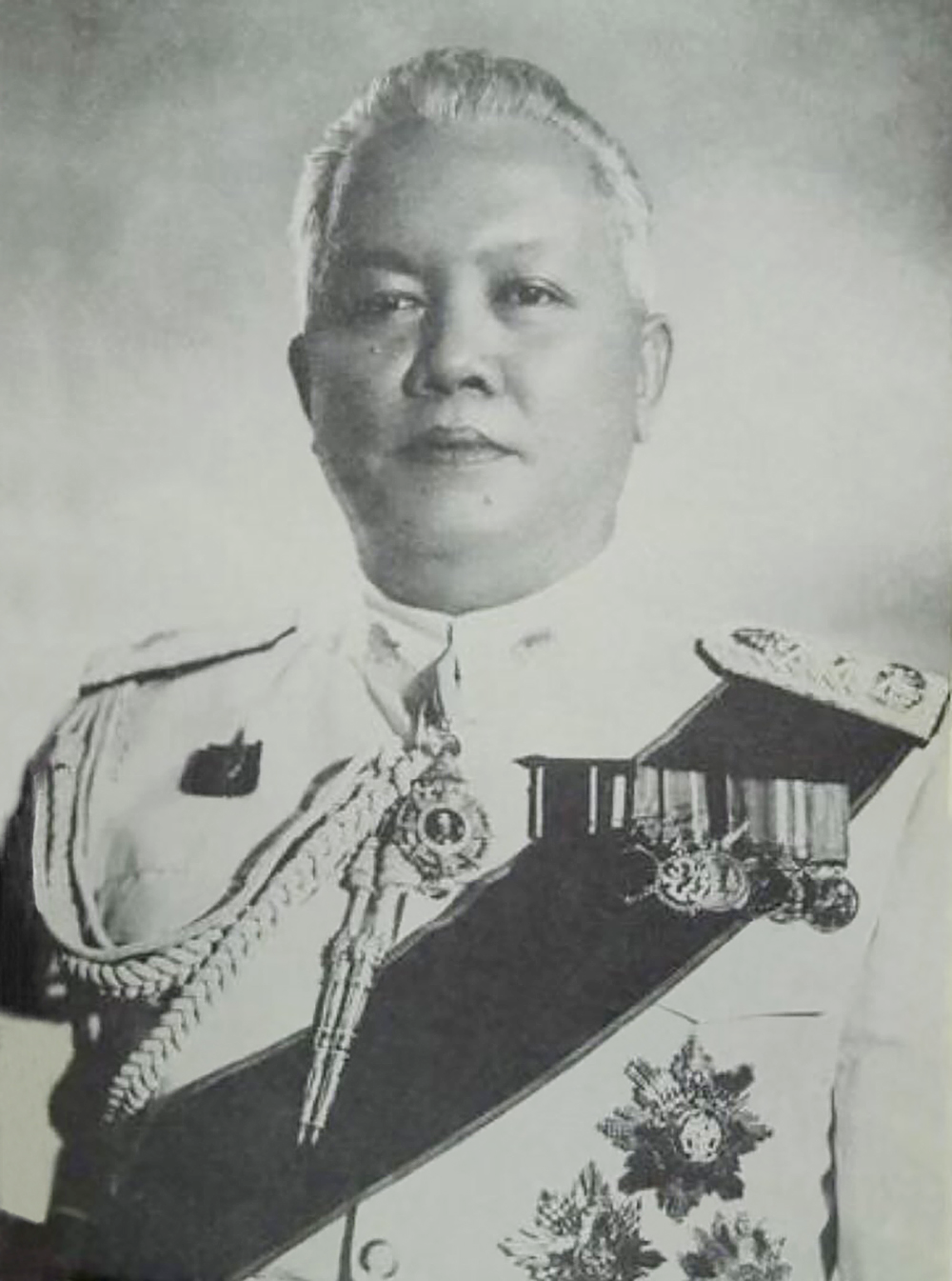
Police Gen.
Phao Siyanon

The third member of the triumvirate was Phibun.

Phibun's second premiership was longer but plagued with political instability, and there were numerous attempts to oppose his rule and remove him from power. Unlike his first premiership, Phibun faced noticeable opposition from people connected to the Free Thai Movement due to his alliance with the Japanese, including from within the military. Additionally, Phibun was indebted to the powerful Coup Group that had returned him to power.

On 1 October 1948, the unsuccessful Army General Staff Plot was launched by members of the army general staff to topple his government, but failed when discovered by the Coup Group. As a result, more than fifty army and reserve officers and several prominent supporters of Pridi Phanomyong were arrested.

On 26 February 1949, the Palace Rebellion was another failed coup attempt against Phibun to restore Pridi Phanomyong by occupying the Grand Palace in Bangkok and declaring a new government led by Direk Jayanama, a close associate of Pridi. The civilian rebels were quickly ousted from the palace, but fighting broke out between military rebels and loyalists which lasted for over a week.

On 29 June 1951, Phibun was attending a ceremony aboard the Manhattan, a US dredge boat, when he was taken hostage by a group of Royal Thai Navy officers, who then quickly confined him aboard the warship Sri Ayutthaya. Negotiations between the government and the coup organizers swiftly broke down, leading to violent street fighting in Bangkok between the navy and the army, which was supported by the Royal Thai Air Force. Phibun was able to escape and swim back to shore when the Sri Ayutthaya was bombed by the air force, and with their hostage gone, the navy were forced to lay down their arms.

"...tell your father [Pridi] that I want [him] to come back [and] help me work for the nation. I alone can no longer contest Sakdina."

— Phibun to one of Pridi's sons in June 1957.

On 29 November 1951, the Silent Coup was staged by the Coup Group and it consolidated the military's hold on the country. It reinstated the Constitution of 1932, which effectively eliminated the Senate, established a unicameral legislature composed equally of elected and government-appointed members, and allowed serving military officers to supplement their commands with important ministerial portfolios.

In 1954 Phibun allied Thailand further with the West in the Cold War by helping establish SEATO.

In 1956, it became clearer that Phibun, allied to Phao, was losing to another influential group led by Sarit which consisted of "Sakdina" (royalties and royalists). Both Phibun and Phao intended to bring home Pridi Banomyong to clear his name from the mystery around the death of King Rama VIII. However, the US government disapproved, and they cancelled the plan.

=== 1957 coup and exile ===
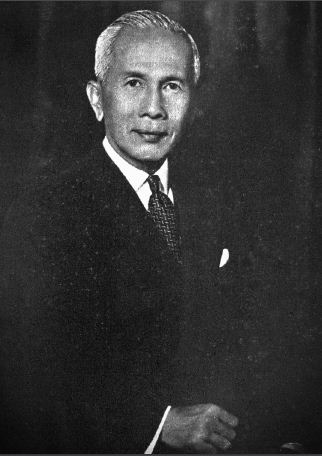
Phibunsongkhram in 1957

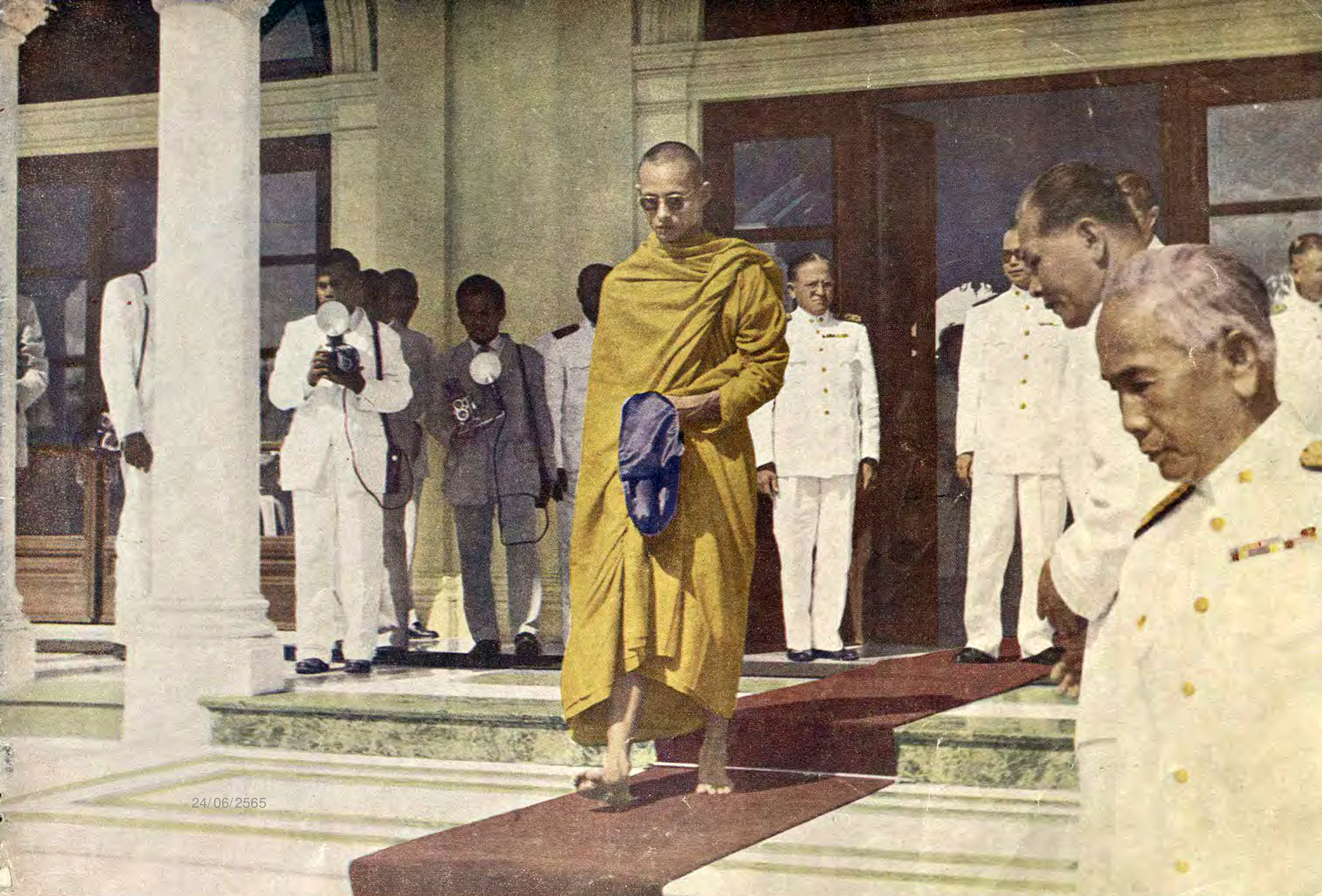
On 31 October 1956, the monk Bhumibalo visited the Government House; Phibun is on the right, The King clashed with Field Marshal Phibun over his restriction of royal power

In February 1957, public opinion turned against Phibun at the end of his second term when his party was suspected of fraudulent practices during an election, including the intimidation of the opposition, buying votes, and electoral fraud. In addition, critics of Phibun accused him of a lack of respect for the Thai monarchy, as the anti-aristocratic prime minister had always sought to limit the role of the monarchy to a constitutional minimum and had taken on religious functions that traditionally belonged to the monarch. For example, Phibun led the celebrations of the 2500th anniversary of Buddhism in 1956–57 instead of the King Bhumibol Adulyadej, who was openly critical of Phibun. On 16 September 1957, Phibun was eventually overthrown in a coup d'etat by members of the Royal Thai Army under the command of Field Marshal Sarit Thanarat, who had earlier sworn to be Phibun's most loyal subordinate. Sarit was supported by many royalists who wanted to regain a foothold, and there were rumours that the United States was "deeply involved" in the coup.

Phibun was then forced into exile after the coup, first fleeing to Cambodia, but later settled in Japan after Sarit's new regime rejected his requests to allow him to return to Thailand. In 1960, Phibun briefly travelled to India to be a monk in the Buddhist temple in Bodhgaya.

== Death ==
Phibun died on 11 June 1964 from heart failure in Tokyo, Japan.

After his death, Phibun's ashes were transferred to Thailand in an urn and decorated with military honours in Wat Phra Si Mahathat (also called "The Temple of Democracy") he had founded in Bang Khen.

== Legacy ==
Phibun remains a deeply controversial figure in Thailand. In royalist histories, he is portrayed as an opportunist with a view to usurping the monarchy; similarly, he is depicted by pro-democracy intellectuals as a “selfish, opportunistic, power-hungry military dictator” who undermined democracy, often in unfavourable comparison with his colleague Pridi Banomyong, who is widely regarded as Thailand’s “father of democracy.” Multiple historians, such as E. Bruce Reynolds, have argued that Phibun’s regime was inspired by fascism in its use of “militant irredentist nationalism,” especially in Phibun’s invocation of Pan-Thaiism to justify the Franco-Thai War. Sulak Sivaraksa, a leading defender of Pridi, described Phibun as a “Führer” promoting “a grand scheme for the Thai race as well as the Thai empire in imitation of Nazi Germany.”

The 1980s and the 1990s saw attempts by revisionist historians to rehabilitate Phibun’s reputation. Nigel Brailey argued Phibun should be recognized for his successes in reforming Thai culture, expanding the education system, and preserving Thailand’s independence, asserting that “his ‘fascism’ or ‘racism’ was of a very superficial kind.” Brailey also pointed out that, in the final years of his regime, Phibun safeguarded Thailand’s fledgling democracy from the authoritarian tendencies of Sarit Thanarat and Phao Siyanon. In her revisionist biography of Phibun, Thailand’s Durable Premier, Kobkua Suwannathat-Pian likewise defended him as a leader with strong, consistent values who left a lasting impact on modern Thailand.

== Honours ==
=== Noble titles ===
- 7 May 1928: Luang Phibunsongkhram (หลวงพิบูลสงคราม)
- 15 May 1942: Abolition of nobility

=== Military rank ===
- May 1916 – Second lieutenant
- April 1920 – Lieutenant
- October 1927 – Captain
- May 1930 – Major
- April 1933 – Lieutenant colonel
- April 1934 – Colonel
- April 1939 – Major General, Rear Admiral, Air Vice Marshal
- July 1941 – Field Marshal, Admiral of the Fleet, Marshal of the Royal Thai Air Force
- June 1955 – Volunteer Defense Corps General

=== Thai decorations ===
Plaek Phibunsongkhram received the following royal decorations in the Honours System of Thailand:

- 1941 – Knight of The Ancient and Auspicious Order of the Nine Gems
- 1942 – The Ratana Varabhorn Order of Merit
- 1942 – Knight Grand Cross (First Class) of The Most Illustrious Order of Chula Chom Klao
- 1940 – Knight Grand Cordon (Special Class) of The Most Exalted Order of the White Elephant
- 1937 – Knight Grand Cordon (Special Class) of The Most Noble Order of the Crown of Thailand
- 1944 – Bravery Medal
- 1941 – Victory Medal – Franco-Thai War with flames
- 1943 – Victory Medal – Pacific War
- 1934 – Safeguarding the Constitution Medal
- 1934 – Dushdi Mala Medal Pin Service to the Nation (Military)
- 1943 – Dushdi Mala Medal Pin of Arts and Science (Military)
- 1943 – Medal for Service Rendered in the Interior - Pacific War
- 1954 – Border Service Medal
- 1930 – Chakra Mala Medal
- 1938 – King Rama VIII Royal Cypher Medal, 1st
- 1953 – King Rama IX Royal Cypher Medal, 1st
- 1911 – King Rama VI Coronation Medal
- 1925 – King Rama VII Coronation Medal
- 1932 – Commemorative Medal on the Occasion of the 150th Years of Rattanakosin Celebration

=== Foreign honours ===
- Nazi Germany:
  - 1937 – Order of the German Red Cross
  - 1939 – 1st Class of the Order of the German Eagle
- Kingdom of Italy:
  - 1937 – Knight Grand Cross of the Order of Saints Maurice and Lazarus
  - 1938 – Grand Officer of the Order of the Crown of Italy
- Francoist Spain:
  - 1955 – Grand Cross with White Decoration of the Order of Military Merit
  - 1954 – Grand Cross White Decoration of the Cross of Naval Merit
- Empire of Japan:
  - 1942 – Grand Cordon of the Order of the Rising Sun
- Philippines:
  - 1955 – Grand Cross of the Order of Sikatuna
- UK:
  - 1939 – Knight Grand Cross of the Order of St Michael and St George
- USA:
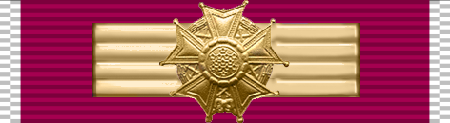
  - 1955 – Chief Commander of the Legion of Merit
- France:
  - 1938 – Grand-Croix of the Legion of Honour
- Belgium:
  - 1955 – Grand Cordon of the Order of Leopold
- Netherlands:
  - 1955 – Knight Grand Cross of the Order of the Netherlands Lion
- Denmark:
  - 1955 – Grand Commander of the Order of the Dannebrog
- Italian Republic:
  - 1955 – Knight Grand Cross of the Order of Merit of the Italian Republic
- Kingdom of Laos:
  - 1955 – Grand Cross of the Order of the Million Elephants and the White Parasol
- Cambodia:
  - 1955 – Knight Grand Cross of the Royal Order of Cambodia
- Kingdom of Greece:
  - 1956 – Grand Cross of the Order of George I
- Germany:
  - 1955 – Grand Cross 1st Class of the Order of Merit of the Federal Republic of Germany
- Union of Burma:
  - 1956 – Grand Commander of the Order of Sirisudharma

=== Academic rank ===
- 1939 Adjunct Professor of Thammasat University

== See also ==
- History of Thailand (1932–1973)
- Saharat Thai Doem
- Nitya Pibulsonggram
- Ramwong
- Thai cultural mandates
- Suharto
- Francisco Franco
- Antonio Salazar
- Joseph McCarthy

== Bibliography ==
- Baker, Chris; Phongpaichit, Pasuk (2009). A History of Thailand (2nd ed.). Cambridge University Press. ISBN 9781139194877.
- Chaloemtiarana, Thak (2007). Thailand. The Politics of Despotic Paternalism. Ithaca: Cornell Southeast Asia Program. ISBN 978-0-87727-742-2.
- Fineman, Daniel (1997). A Special Relationship. The United States and Military Government in Thailand, 1947–1958. Honolulu: University of Hawaiʻi Press. ISBN 0-8248-1818-0.
- Mokarapong, Thawatt (1972). History of Thai Revolution. A study in political behaviour. Bangkok: Chalermnit. ISBN 974-07-5396-5.
- Numnonda, Thamsook (1977). Thailand and the Japanese Presence 1941–1945. Singapore: Institute of Southeast Asian Studies.
- Reynolds, E. Bruce (2004). Phibun Songkhram And Thai Nationalism in the Fascist Era. European Journal of East Asian Studies. Vol. 3. pp. 99–134. doi:10.1163/1570061033004686.
- Stowe, Judith A. (1991). Siam Becomes Thailand. A Story of Intrigue. London: C. Hurst & Co. ISBN 0-8248-1393-6.
- Suwannathat-Pian, Kobkua (1995). Thailand's Durable Premier. Phibun through three decades, 1932–1957. Oxford University Press. ISBN 967-65-3053-0.
- Terwiel, Barend Jan (1980). Field Marshal Plaek Phibun Songkhram. St. Lucia: University of Queensland Press. ISBN 0-7022-1509-0.
- Staniczek, Lukasz (1999). Pibun Songkram 's Role in Thailand's Entry into the Pacific War (Thesis). Arkadelphia: Ouachita Baptist University.
- Wyatt, David K. (2003). Thailand. A Short History (2nd ed.). Yale University Press. ISBN 0-300-08475-7.

Political offices
Preceded by Phraya Phahonphonphayuhasena	Minister of Defence; 1934–1941	Succeeded by Luang Phromyothi
Preceded by Phraya Phahonphonphayuhasena	Prime Minister of Thailand; 1938–1944	Succeeded by Khuang Aphaiwong
Preceded by Luang Thamrongnawasawat	Minister of Interior; 1938–1941	Succeeded by Luang Chawengsaksongkram
Preceded by Chaophraya Srithammatibet	Minister of Foreign Affairs; 1939–1941	Succeeded by Direk Jayanama
Preceded by Luang Phromyothi	Minister of Defence; 1941–1943	Succeeded by Phichit Kriangsakphichit
Preceded by Direk Jayanama	Minister of Foreign Affairs; 1941–1942	Succeeded by Wichit Wichitwathakan
Preceded by Luang Sinthusongkhramchai	Minister of Education; 1942	Succeeded by Prayoon Pamornmontri
Preceded by Khuang Aphaiwong	Prime Minister of Thailand; 1948–1957	Vacant Sarit Thanarat (acting) Title next held by Pote Sarasin
Preceded by Khuang Aphaiwong	Minister of Interior; 1948–1949	Succeeded by Mangkorn Phromyothi
Preceded by Luang Chatnakrob	Minister of Defence; 1949–1957	Succeeded by Sarit Thanarat
Preceded by Prince Priditheppong Devakula	Minister of Foreign Affairs; 1949	Succeeded by Pote Sarasin
Preceded by Prince Vivadhanajaya Jayanta	Minister of Finance; 1949–1950	Succeeded by Phra Manuwimonsat
First	Leader of the Provisional Government Council; 1951	Abolished position
First	Minister of Culture; 1952–1955	Succeeded by Luang Yuthasastr Kosol
Preceded by Nai Worakanbancha	Minister of Economics; 1954	Succeeded by Siri Siriyothin
Preceded by Luang Sunawinwiwat	Minister of Interior; 1955–1957	Succeeded by Phao Siyanon
Preceded by Siri Siriyothin	Minister of Cooperatives; 1957	Succeeded by Wibun Thammabut
Assembly seats
Preceded by Chat Sriyanon; Channothai Rieksut; Chintasen Chaiyakam; Bhethai Amatayakul; Chot Kunakasem	Member of the House of Representatives for Phra Nakhon; 1957 with Khuang Aphaiwong; Pao Pienlert Boripanyutakit; Munee Mahasanthana Vejayantarungsarit; Banyat Devahastin na Ayudhya; Phra Prayutchonlathi; Phraya Ladphlithammaprakal; Mangkorn Phromyothi; Luang Sawasdisorayut	Succeeded by Luang Angkananurak; Khuang Aphaiwong; Chalit Kulkamthon; Thawin Rawangphai; Sombun Sirithon; Phra Prayutchonlathi; Luang Supachalasai; Luang Srisaliphit; Pao Pienlert Boripanyutakit
Party political offices
Preceded by Phraya Phahonphonphayuhasena	Head of the military faction of the Khana Ratsadon; 1938–1947	Abolished position
First	Leader of the Seri Manangkhasila Party; 1955–1957	Party dissolved
Military offices
Preceded by Phraya Phahonphonphayuhasena	Commander-in-chief of the Royal Thai Army; 1938–1944	Succeeded by Phichit Kriangsakphichit
First	Supreme Commander of the Royal Thai Armed Forces; 1940–1941	Vacant Title next held by Himself
Vacant Title last held by Himself	Supreme Commander of the Royal Thai Armed Forces; 1941–1944	Vacant Title next held by Sarit Thanarat
Preceded by Adul Aduldejjarus	Commander-in-chief of the Royal Thai Army; 1947–1948	Succeeded by Phin Choonhavan
Academic offices
First	President of Silpakorn University Committee; 1943–1957	Succeeded by Thanom Kittikachorn
Educational offices
Preceded by Aller Gustin Ellis	President of Chulalongkorn University; 1936–1944	Succeeded by Prince Rachadabhisek Sonakul
Preceded by Prince Rachadabhisek Sonakul	President of Chulalongkorn University; 1949–1950	Succeeded by Munee Mahasanthana Vejayantarungsarit
Vacant Sawat Sawatronnachai Sawatdikiat (Acting) Title last held by Pridi Banomyong as President of University of Moral and Political Sciences	President of Thammasat University; 1952–1957	Vacant Thawi Raengkham (Acting) Title next held by Luang Chamrunnetisat
