= National Military Council (Thailand) =

Group of Thai military officers responsible for the 1947 coup

The National Military Council (Thai: คณะทหารแห่งชาติ) was the group of military officers that planned and carried out a coup d'état in November 1947 in Thailand. Their prestige and influence were quickly enhanced by Field Marshal Plaek Phibunsongkhram's return to politics. They would however outlast him and dominate Thai politics for the next two decades. Most would eventually receive high ranks, becoming generals and field marshals.

== Membership ==
The council consisted of approximately forty junior army officers led by a small number of commanding officers, many of whom had been forced into retirement by Pridi Banomyong at the end of the Second World War—men with little other than conspiracy to keep themselves occupied.

The coterie's leading members were Field Marshal Sarit Thanarat, commander of the Bangkok-based First Division, Police General Phao Siyanon, the powerful chief of police, Field Marshal Phin Choonhavan, Phao's father-in-law, the politically prominent Lieutenant-General Kat Katsongkhram, and Marshal of the Royal Thai Air Force Fuen Ritthakhanee, the air force's combat-experienced commander.

Less senior members included Phin's son, Chatichai Choonhavan, and Sarit's protégés Thanom Kittikachorn and Praphas Charusathien.

== See also ==
- Military of Thailand
- Siamese coup d'état of 1947
