= 1957 Thai coup d'état =

Military coup led by Sarit Thanarat

- Part of the Cold War
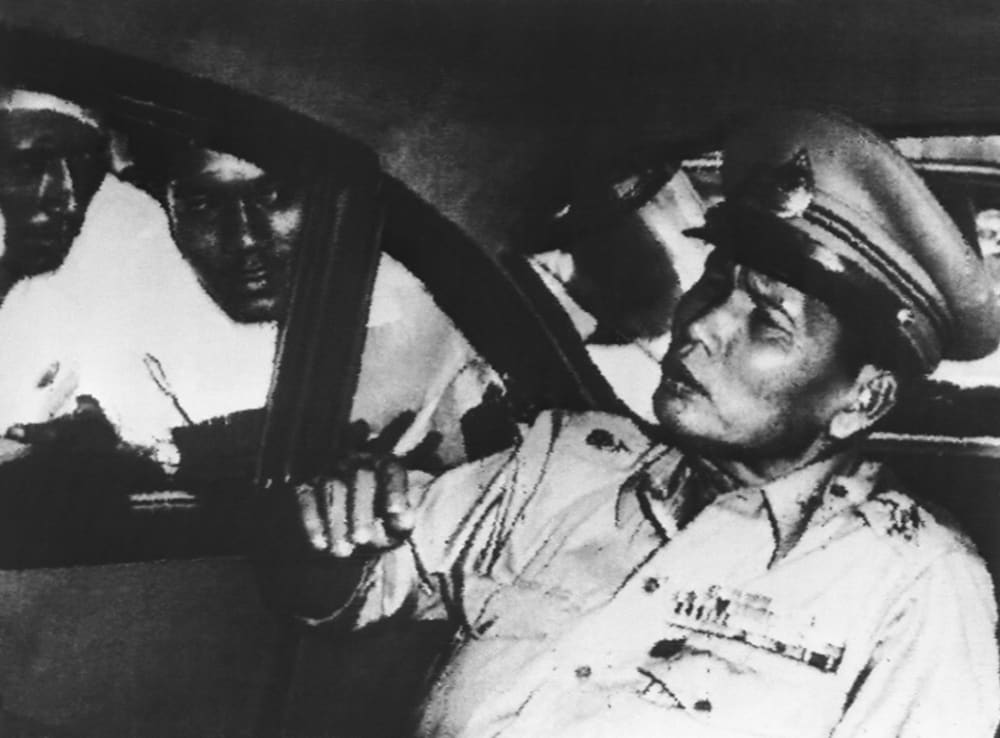
- Sarit Thanarat, the leader of the coup, in 1957
Date	17 September 1957; 68 years ago
Location	Bangkok, Thailand
Result	Coup successful: Government dissolved; Prime Minister Plaek Phibunsongkhram fled the country and Phao Siyanon was exiled to Europe; Military Revolutionary Council takes power; Thailand becomes authoritarian under a military dictatorship; Royal prerogative was restored

Belligerents
(Thailand) Royal Thai Armed Forces; Supported by: Monarchy of Thailand; Democrat Party	Phibun cabinet Royal Thai Police

Commanders and leaders
Sarit Thanarat; Thanom Kittikachorn; Praphas Charusathien; Kris Sivara	Plaek Phibunsongkhram; Phao Siyanon

On 16 September 1957, Thailand experienced a military coup led by Field Marshal Sarit Thanarat. This bloodless coup ended the government of Prime Minister Plaek Phibunsongkhram. His administration had faced growing criticism for corruption, poor economic management, and political misconduct. The military claimed the coup was necessary to restore order and protect national unity during a time of increasing unrest. Sarit's swift takeover of Bangkok signaled a new phase of military power in Thai politics.

The coup stemmed from a power struggle among Thailand's ruling elite. Phibun was in rivalry with Police General Phao Siyanon, who had significant influence due to his control over the police force. Although Sarit had once supported Phibun, he later strengthened his position in the military and sought to marginalize both Phibun and Phao.

Earlier in 1957, national elections occurred amid claims of widespread fraud and intimidation. Phibun tried to manipulate the election to keep his grip on power. However, these irregularities sparked public outrage and eroded trust in the government, worsening the political crisis and leading to military action.

After the coup, Sarit became the leading political figure, although he initially chose not to take on the role of prime minister. His government concentrated on tightening military control, silencing dissent, and establishing a more centralized and authoritarian governing system. Sarit put a strong focus on economic growth and building closer ties with Western powers during the Cold War. The coup not only ended civilian rule under Phibun but also set a standard for military influence in Thailand's politics, shaping the country's governance for many years.

== Situation ==
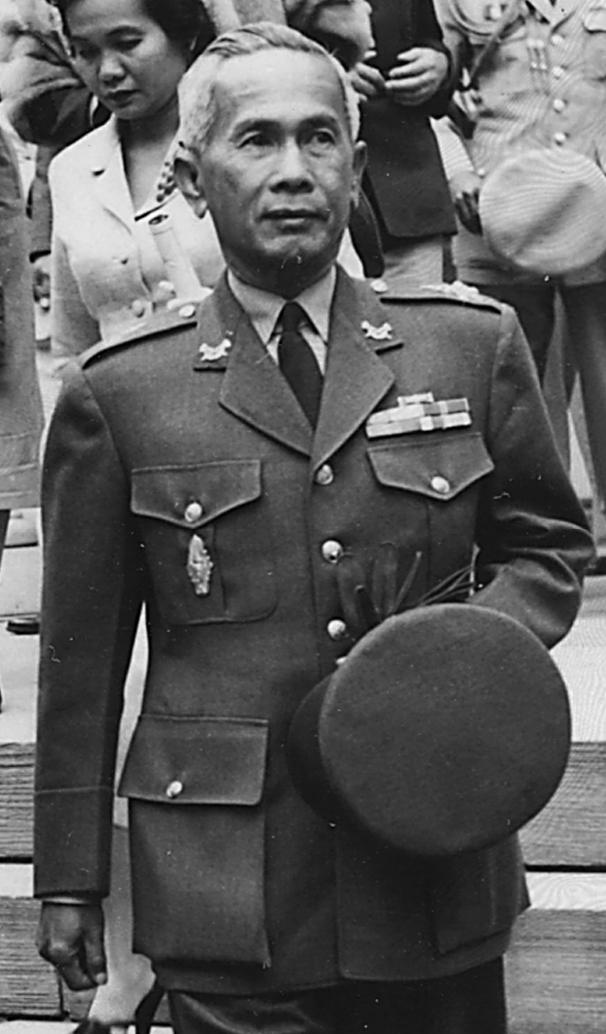
Plaek Phibunsongkhram, who served as Prime Minister from 1948 to 1957

The coup came after ten years of military rule under Field Marshal Plaek Phibunsongkhram (known as Phibun). During this time, many conflicts and power struggles emerged among different factions in the armed forces. Supporters of former liberal Prime Minister Pridi Phanomyong, who still had allies in the military, tried and failed to overthrow Phibun twice—in 1949 and 1951. The rivalries within the army were not just about political and military control but also about economic power. In 1955, Phibun allowed the creation of political parties, and one of them, the Seri Manangkhasila Party, became the ruling party. It was led mainly by top military figures—Phibun himself, General Sarit Thanarat (the Army Commander-in-Chief), and Police Director-General Phao Siyanon. However, instead of unity, each of these men built their own internal factions to strengthen their personal influence.

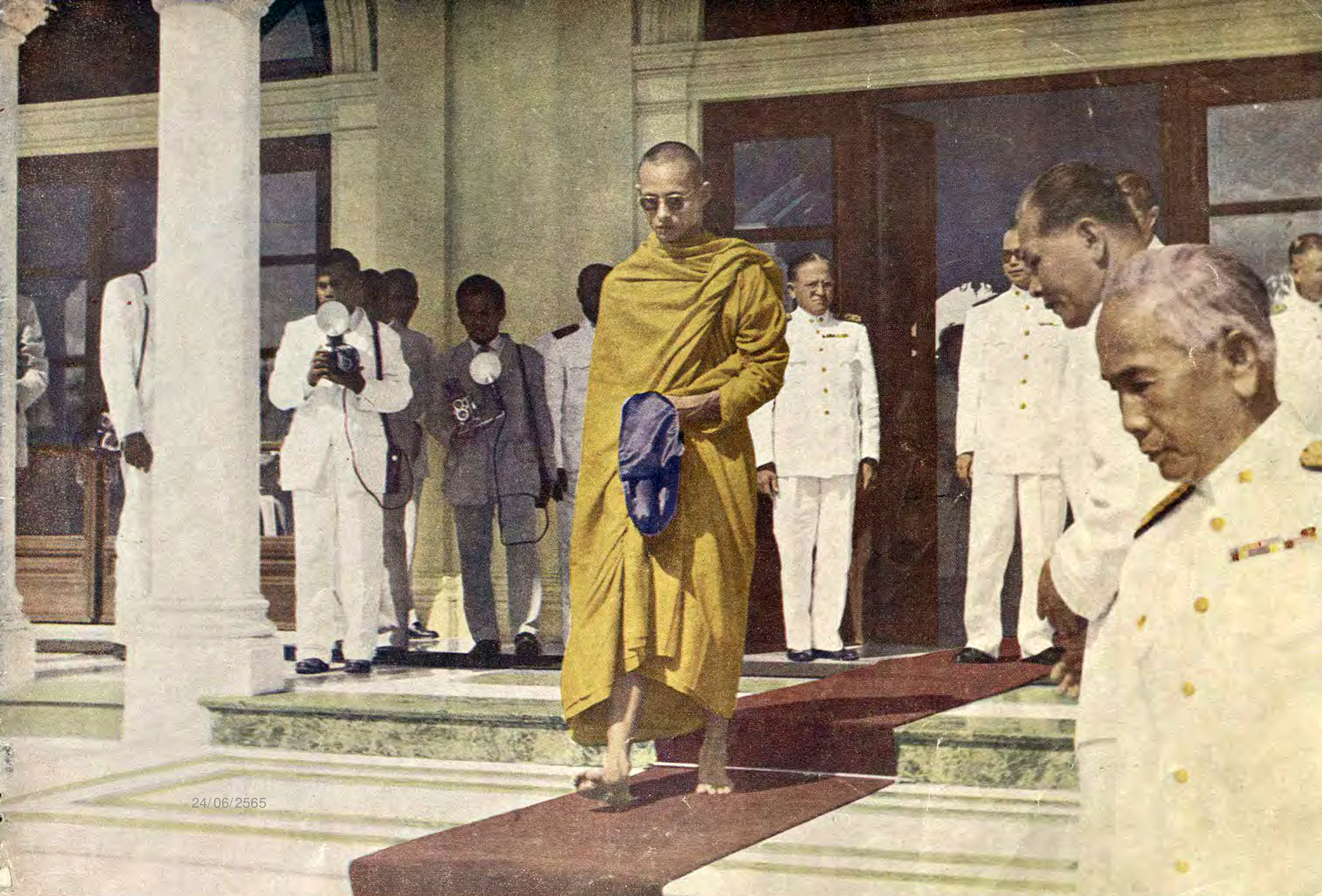
King Bhumibol during his monkhood, visiting the Government House to ask for alms on 31 October 1956. Prime Minister Plaek Phibunsongkhram is on the right.

The February 1957 general elections was widely seen as corrupt, with massive vote-buying and manipulation by the government. This caused a public backlash against Phibun and Phao. Sarit and parts of the military sided with the opposition, accusing the government of fraud and corruption. When Phibun tried to form a new cabinet, 48 army officers, including Sarit and his deputy General Thanom Kittikachorn, resigned in protest.

Large public demonstrations soon broke out against the government. King Bhumibol Adulyadej also disapproved of Phibun and supported his removal. Phibun had long been critical of the monarchy, trying to limit its role to purely constitutional duties. The King, in turn, never hid his dislike for the Prime Minister. Tensions grew even more when Phibun took on religious duties that were traditionally reserved for the monarch—such as leading the 1956–57 celebrations for the 2,500th anniversary of Buddhism. His attempt to gain popularity among the people through these acts failed and only deepened the divide.

== Key figures ==
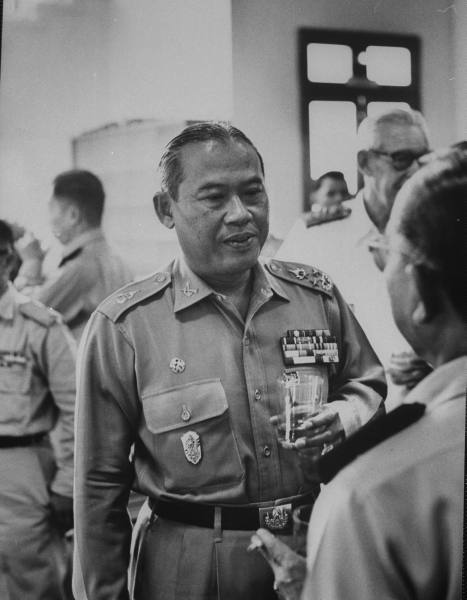
General Thanom Kittikachorn

The coup was led by the faction around Sarit. Key figures in this group included Thanom, commander of the 1st Army and Sarit's second-in-command, and his deputy, Lieutenant General Praphas Charusathien, who headed the 1st Division. These officers were not only powerful in the military but also heavily involved in business, which earned them the nickname "the soldiers of profit". Other major participants were Major General Praesert Ruchirawong, commander of the Air Defense Division, and Brigadier General Kris Sivara. The group also had support from technocrats and intellectuals, making it a broad network beyond just the military.

Under Sarit's leadership, the army quickly took control of all key locations in Bangkok, forcing Phibun and Phao to flee the country.

According to Paul Handley, King Bhumibol's biographer, it is possible the King quietly supported the coup, judging by how quickly he recognized the new rulers. Soon after the coup, the King declared martial law, appointed Sarit as "Defender of Bangkok," and gave him the power to countersign royal decrees. He also sent a message to the coup leaders saying: "His Majesty the King has graciously observed that the Revolutionary Council's goal to protect the people, ensure the nation's well-being, and promote the country's prosperity is a noble one. (...) You will have His Majesty's full blessing if you fulfill all of this." However, political scientist Thak Chaloemtiarana offers a different view, arguing that the King likely had little choice but to accept Sarit's actions. After the coup, members of the Privy Council quickly contacted Western embassies to assure them that Sarit was a loyal royalist, strongly anti-communist, and fully supported by the palace.

== Motivation ==
To explain the coup, it is important to look at the deep rivalries within the military government itself. The main conflict was between the factions led by Sarit and Phao, both of whom were competing for power and influence. Economic interests also played a major role—by the 1950s, many high-ranking officers had become deeply involved in business. Some even controlled large companies, which often competed against each other just as fiercely as their leaders did within the government.

As with other military coups, this one was also driven by a sense of the army's "humiliation". When Phibun's election manipulation became public, it damaged the reputation of the armed forces. Sarit and his supporters, who saw themselves as professional soldiers, were deeply troubled by what they considered Phibun's unprofessional and unethical behavior.

Sarit claimed that his coup was carried out in response to the people's demand for fair elections and that it was meant to protect the national interest. At first, his actions seemed to reflect this: after the coup, he appointed a respected technocrat as prime minister and held elections that December. However, this image of reform quickly faded. Sarit soon established a direct military dictatorship under his own control, and his rule became marked by widespread corruption—contradicting the very principles he had claimed to defend.

== Consequences ==
The coup firmly established military control over Thailand for the next fifteen years. From then on, the armed forces dominated both politics and the economy. After a short period under civilian Prime Minister Pote Sarasin, power returned to the military—first under Sarit, and later, after his death in 1963, under his subordinate Thanom. The coup leaders also strengthened their economic influence through an extensive system of military patronage that reached into business and politics. The Sahaphum Party became the dominant political force, while opposition groups were largely weakened or silenced. Meanwhile, the careers of Phibun and Phao ended, and their followers were removed from positions of power.

After the coup, Pote Sarasin, a respected diplomat and former Secretary-General of SEATO, was appointed Prime Minister. He promoted close cooperation with the United States. Sarit, meanwhile, took over control of the police, removing supporters of Phao and cutting back the police's political power. He also sidelined rivals in the navy and air force, leaving the First Army Division as the main center of military and political strength. In the December elections, Pote's party won only a slim victory, leading him to step down as head of government.

Thanom then took over as acting Prime Minister while Sarit went abroad for medical treatment due to liver problems. However, political tensions continued to grow. In the March 1958 by-elections, the ruling party suffered losses to the opposition Democrats. Thanom's government faced growing unrest—budget disputes, strikes, protests, and harsh media criticism. From England, Sarit decided that the situation required a complete authoritarian "revolution".

When he returned to Thailand in October 1958, Sarit suspended the constitution, declared martial law, and imposed strict censorship. His government, known as the "Revolutionary Council," ruled by decree. Sarit promoted public discipline and morality campaigns—targeting crime, prostitution, and drugs—but also arrested and silenced political opponents, often labeling them as communists and imprisoning them without trial. A strong royalist, Sarit worked to restore the monarchy's prestige, which had declined since the 1932 revolution. He returned control of the Crown Property Bureau—previously managed by the Ministry of Finance—to King Bhumibol. In exchange, the monarchy's open support gave Sarit legitimacy and public acceptance.

Following a World Bank mission to Thailand between 1957 and 1958, which analyzed and exposed weaknesses in the national economy, Sarit's government abandoned its policy of state-led industrialization and shifted toward a market economy based on private enterprise. The authoritarian and paternalistic Sarit–Thanom era was also a period of rapid economic growth and accelerated development, including in previously underdeveloped rural areas. The coup did not alter Thailand's close relations with the United States, which remained the country's strongest ally in the region, especially during the Second Indochina War.

== See also ==
- History of Thailand (1932–1973)

== Sources ==
- Grabowsky, Volker (2010). Kleine Geschichte Thailands (in German). Munich: C.H. Beck. ISBN 978-3-406-60129-3.
- Kiener, Robert Patrick (1983). The September 16, 1957 Coup d'etat, in "An analysis of the 1981 unsuccessful Thai coup" (PDF) (master thesis). University of Hong Kong. Archived from the original on May 3, 2014.
- Peitz, Martina (2008). Tigersprung des Elefanten: Rent-seeking, Nation Building und nachholende Entwicklung in Thailand (in German). Zürich: LIT Verlag. ISBN 978-3-8258-1772-5.
