= Deputy Prime Minister of Thailand =

Thai government minister

Deputy Prime Minister of the Kingdom of Thailand
- รองนายกรัฐมนตรีแห่งราชอาณาจักรไทย
- Seal of the Office of the Prime Minister

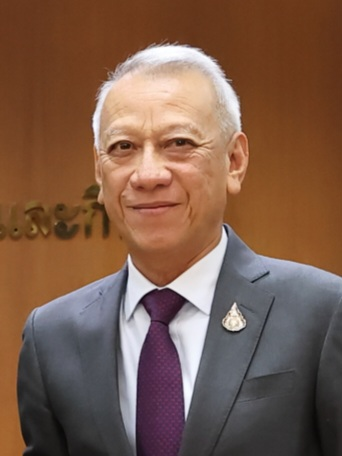
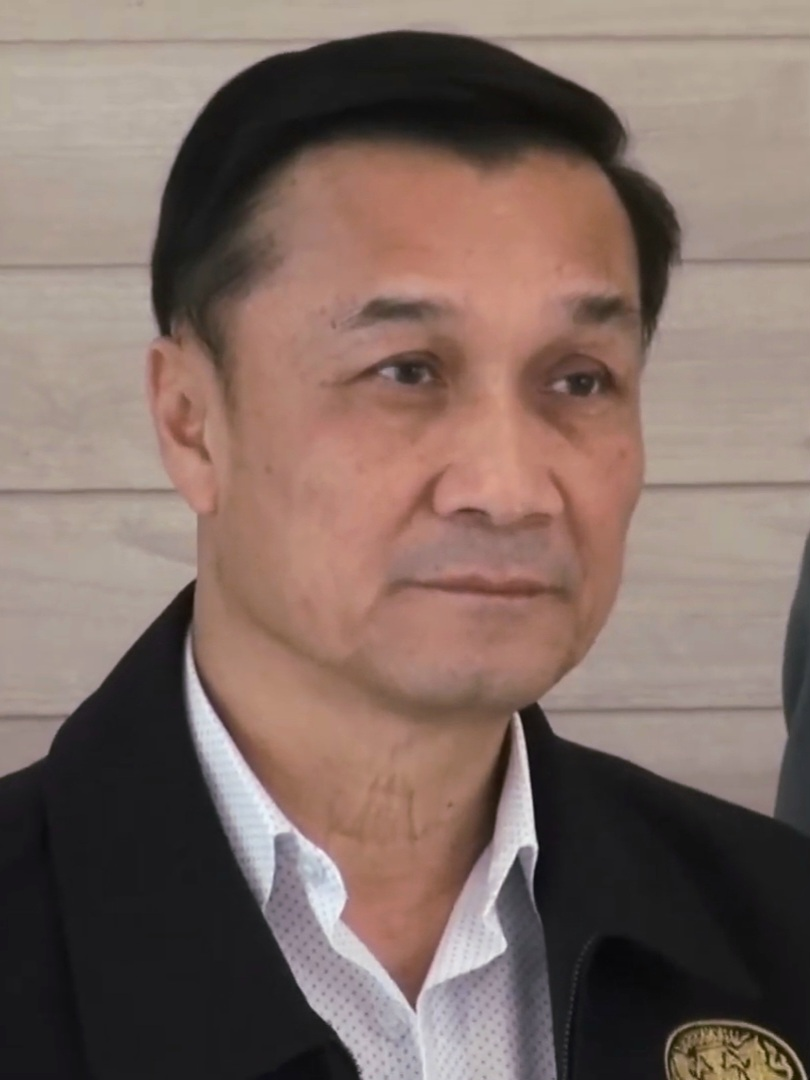
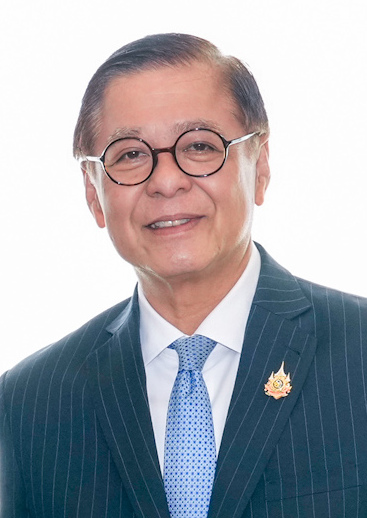
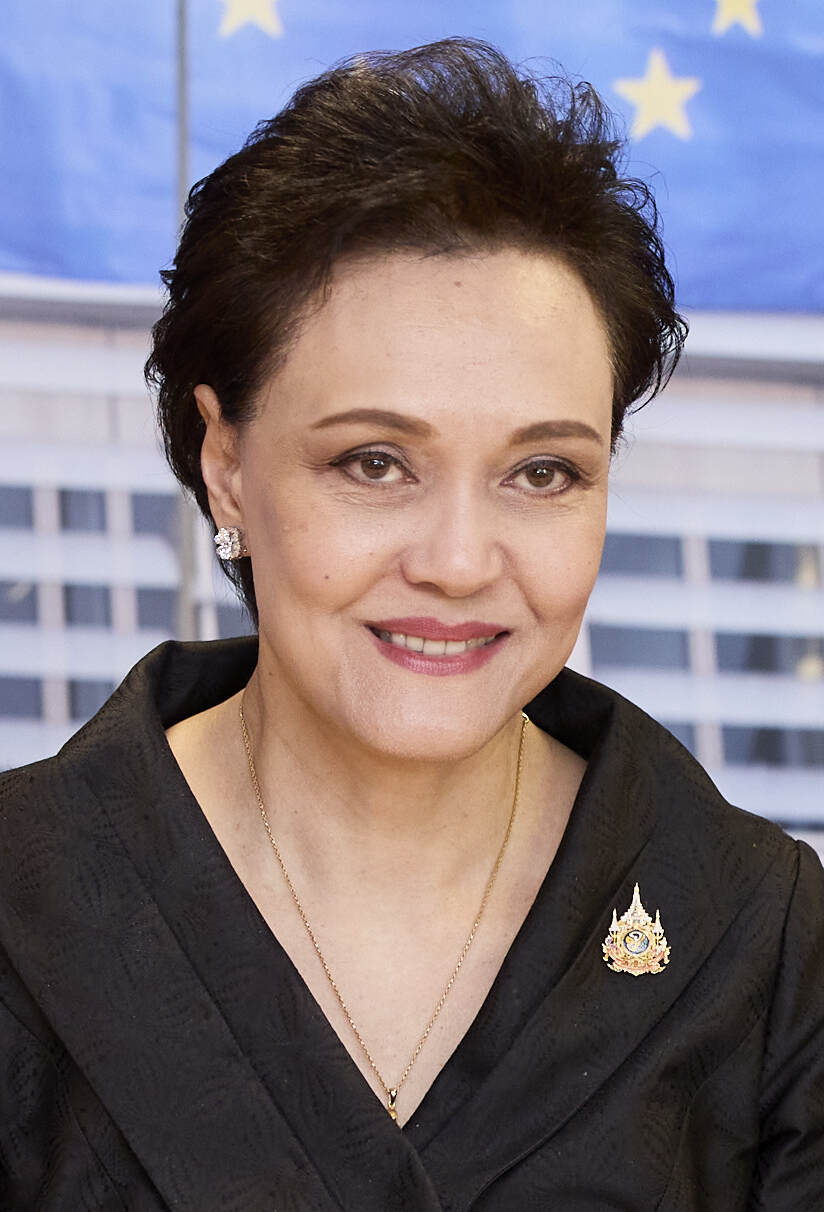
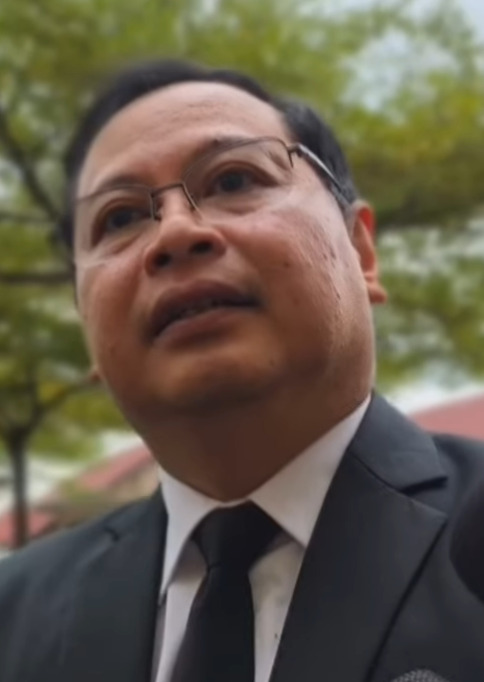
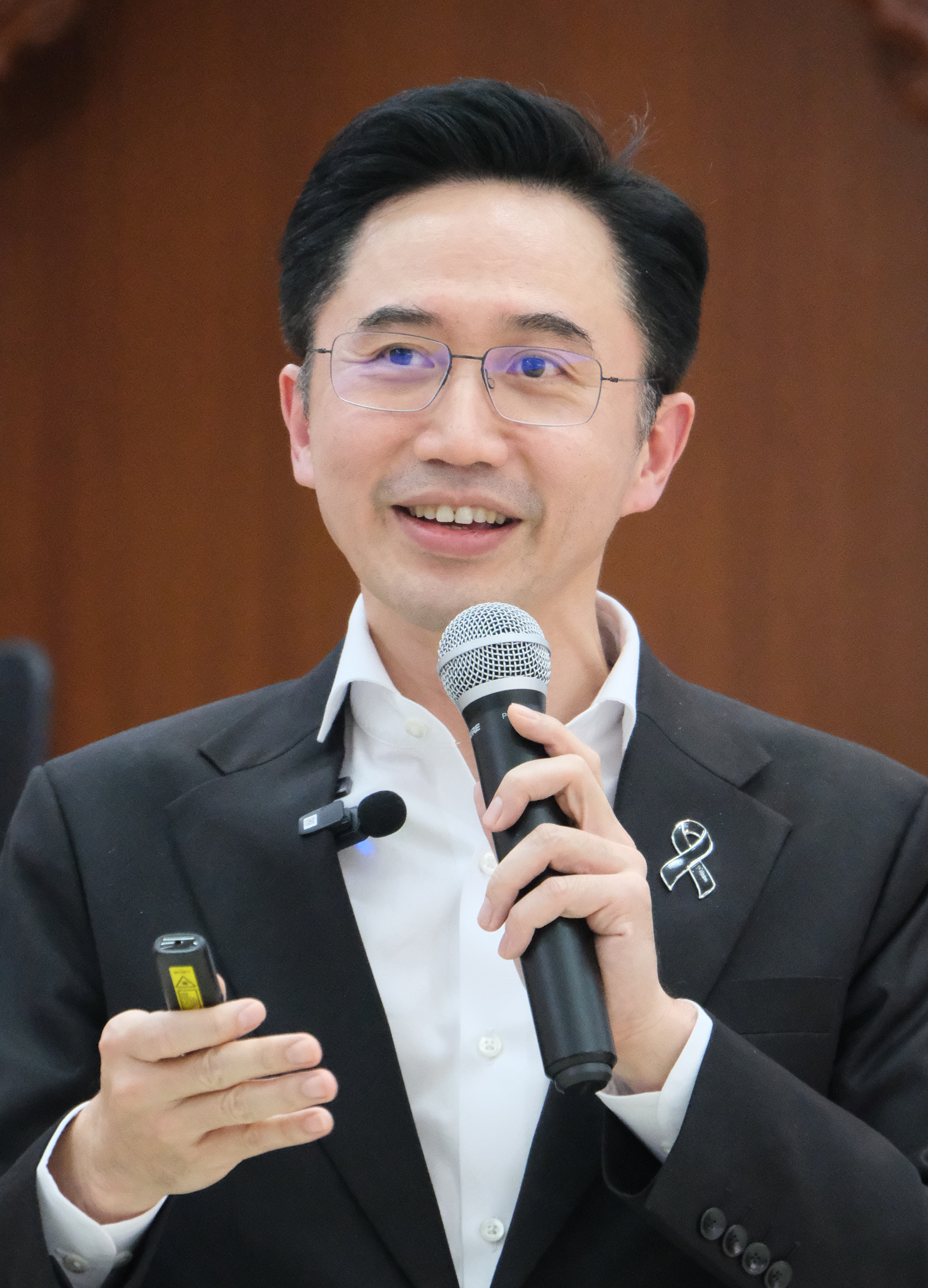
- Incumbent; Phipat Ratchakitprakarn; Ekniti Nitithanprapas since 19 September 2025; Songsak Thongsri; Sihasak Phuangketkeow; Suphajee Suthumpun; Pakorn Nilprapunt; Yodchanan Wongsawat since 30 March 2026
- Ministry of Defence
- Style: Mr./Madam Deputy Prime Minister (informal); The Honourable (formal); His Excellency (diplomatic)
- Type: Deputy head of government
- Member of: Cabinet of Thailand; National Security Council
- Reports to: Prime Minister of Thailand
- Seat: Government House
- Nominator: Prime Minister of Thailand
- Appointer: King of Thailand; (by royal command)
- Term length: until the expiration of the term or the dissolution of the prime minister
- Constituting instrument: Constitution of Thailand
- Formation: 14 September 1943; 83 years ago
- First holder: Adun Adundetcharat; Chuang Chaungsakdisongkram
- Salary: ฿119,920 per month ($3,589 USD)
- Website: www.thaigov.go.th

The deputy prime minister of Thailand (รองนายกรัฐมนตรี, RTGS: Rong Nayok Ratthamontri Thai pronunciation: [rɔ̄ːŋ.nāːjók.rát.tʰa.mōn.trīː]) is a ministerial position within the government of Thailand. Several deputy prime ministers can be appointed and serve concurrently. Such appointments are usually made by the prime minister of Thailand. This position can be combined with other ministerial portfolios. The position was first created in 1943.

== Current deputy prime ministers ==
Office (Other portfolios)	Portrait	Name	Party
Deputy Prime Minister (Minister of Transport)		Phipat Ratchakitprakarn (since 19 September 2025)	Bhumjaithai
Deputy Prime Minister		Songsak Thongsri (since 30 March 2026)	Bhumjaithai
Deputy Prime Minister (Minister of Finance)		Ekniti Nitithanpraphat (since 19 September 2025)	Bhumjaithai
Deputy Prime Minister (Minister of Foreign Affairs)		Sihasak Phuangketkeow (since 30 March 2026)	Bhumjaithai
Deputy Prime Minister (Minister of Commerce)		Suphajee Suthumpun (since 30 March 2026)	Bhumjaithai
Deputy Prime Minister		Pakorn Nilprapunt (since 30 March 2026)	Independent
Deputy Prime Minister (Minister of Higher Education, Science, Research and Innovation)		Yodchanan Wongsawat (since 30 March 2026)	Pheu Thai

== List of deputy prime ministers of Thailand ==
No.	Portrait	Deputy prime minister (Lifespan)	Term of office		Party	Prime minister (Tenure)	Cabinet
No.	Portrait	Deputy prime minister (Lifespan)	Took office	Left office	Party	Prime minister (Tenure)	Cabinet
1		Adun Adundetcharat อดุล อดุลเดชจรัส (1884–1969)	14 September 1943	24 July 1944	Khana Ratsadon	Plaek Phibunsongkhram (1938–1944)	10th
2		Chuang Chaungsakdisongkram ช่วง เชวงศักดิ์สงคราม (1899–1962)	14 September 1943	24 July 1944	Khana Ratsadon	Plaek Phibunsongkhram (1938–1944)	10th
(1)		Adun Adundetcharat อดุล อดุลเดชจรัส (1884–1969)	17 September 1945	31 January 1946	Khana Ratsadon	Seni Pramoj (1945–1946)	13th
3		Direk Jayanama ดิเรก ชัยนาม (1904–1967)	23 August 1946	6 February 1947	Khana Ratsadon	Thawan Thamrongnawasawat (1946–1947)	17th
4		Duean Bunnag เดือน บุนนาค (1905–1982)	30 May 1947	8 November 1947	Khana Ratsadon	Thawan Thamrongnawasawat (1946–1947)	18th
5		Sawat Sawatronnachai Sawatdikiat สวัสดิ์ สวัสดิ์รณชัย สวัสดิเกียรติ (1899–1953)	1 February 1951	29 November 1951	Independent	Plaek Phibunsongkhram (1948–1957)	22nd
(5)		Sawat Sawatronnachai Sawatdikiat สวัสดิ์ สวัสดิ์รณชัย สวัสดิเกียรติ (1899–1953)	29 November 1951	6 December 1951	Independent	Plaek Phibunsongkhram (1948–1957)	23rd
6		Phin Choonhavan ผิน ชุณหะวัณ (1891–1973)	6 December 1951	24 March 1952	Independent	Plaek Phibunsongkhram (1948–1957)	24th
(6)		Phin Choonhavan ผิน ชุณหะวัณ (1891–1973)	28 March 1952	19 April 1956	Independent	Plaek Phibunsongkhram (1948–1957)	25th
7		Munee Mahasanthana Vejayantarungsarit มุนี มหาสันทนะ เวชยันต์รังสฤษฎ์ (1893–1985)	25 December 1953	2 August 1955	Seri Manangkhasila	Plaek Phibunsongkhram (1948–1957)	25th
8		Nai Vorkarnbancha นายวรการบัญชา (1903–1974)	4 February 1954	26 February 1957	Seri Manangkhasila	Plaek Phibunsongkhram (1948–1957)	25th
9		Fuen Ronnaphagrad Ritthakhanee ฟื้น รณนภากาศ ฤทธาคนี (1900–1987)	2 August 1954	26 February 1957	Seri Manangkhasila	Plaek Phibunsongkhram (1948–1957)	25th
(9)		Fuen Ronnaphagrad Ritthakhanee ฟื้น รณนภากาศ ฤทธาคนี (1900–1987)	21 March 1957	16 September 1957	Seri Manangkhasila	Plaek Phibunsongkhram (1948–1957)	26th
10		Prayoon Yuthasastrkosol ประยูร ยุทธศาสตร์โกศล (1893–1975)	21 March 1957	16 September 1957	Independent	Plaek Phibunsongkhram (1948–1957)	26th
11		Wan Waithayakon วรรณไวทยากร (1891–1976)	1 January 1958	28 October 1958	Independent	Thanom Kittikachorn (1958)	28th
12		Praphas Charusathien ประภาส จารุเสถียร (1912–1997)	1 January 1958	28 October 1958	National Socialist	Thanom Kittikachorn (1958)	28th
13		Sukich Nimmanheminda สุกิจ นิมมานเหมินท์ (1906–1976)	1 January 1958	28 October 1958	National Socialist	Thanom Kittikachorn (1958)	28th
14		Thanom Kittikachorn ถนอม กิตติขจร (1911–2004)	9 February 1959	8 December 1963	Independent	Sarit Thanarat (1959–1963)	29th
(11)		Wan Waithayakon วรรณไวทยากร (1891–1976)	9 February 1959	8 December 1963	Independent	Sarit Thanarat (1959–1963)	29th
(11)		Wan Waithayakon วรรณไวทยากร (1891–1976)	9 December 1963	7 March 1969	Independent	Thanom Kittikachorn (1963–1973)	30th
(12)		Praphas Charusathien ประภาส จารุเสถียร (1912–1997)	9 December 1963	7 March 1969	Independent (until 1968)	Thanom Kittikachorn (1963–1973)	30th
(12)		Praphas Charusathien ประภาส จารุเสถียร (1912–1997)	9 December 1963	7 March 1969	United Thai People's (from 1968)	Thanom Kittikachorn (1963–1973)	30th
(12)		Praphas Charusathien ประภาส จารุเสถียร (1912–1997)	7 March 1969	17 November 1971	United Thai People's	Thanom Kittikachorn (1963–1973)	31st
15		Pote Sarasin พจน์ สารสิน (1905–2000)	7 March 1969	17 November 1971	United Thai People's	Thanom Kittikachorn (1963–1973)	31st
(12)		Praphas Charusathien ประภาส จารุเสถียร (1912–1997)	18 December 1972	14 October 1973	Independent	Thanom Kittikachorn (1963–1973)	32nd
(13)		Sukich Nimmanheminda สุกิจ นิมมานเหมินท์ (1906–1976)	14 October 1973	22 May 1974	Independent	Sanya Dharmasakti (1973–1975)	33rd
16		Prakob Hutasingh ประกอบ หุตะสิงห์ (1912–1994)	27 May 1974	14 February 1975	Independent	Sanya Dharmasakti (1973–1975)	34th
17		Sawet Piamphongsan เสวตร เปี่ยมพงศ์สานต์ (1909–2002)	15 February 1975	13 March 1975	Social Agrarian	Seni Pramoj (1975)	35th
18		Pramarn Adireksarn ประมาณ อดิเรกสาร (1913–2010)	14 March 1975	12 January 1976	Thai Nation	Kukrit Pramoj (1975–1976)	36th
19		Thawit Klinprathum ทวิช กลิ่นประทุม (1930–2006)	8 January 1976	11 February 1976	Social Justice	Kukrit Pramoj (1975–1976)	36th
20		Boontheng Thongsawat บุญเท่ง ทองสวัสดิ์ (1912–1999)	8 January 1976	12 January 1976	Social Action	Kukrit Pramoj (1975–1976)	36th
(18)		Pramarn Adireksarn ประมาณ อดิเรกสาร (1913–2010)	20 April 1976	23 September 1976	Thai Nation	Seni Pramoj (1976)	37th
(17)		Sawet Piamphongsan เสวตร เปี่ยมพงศ์สานต์ (1909–2002)	20 April 1976	23 September 1976	Social Agrarian	Seni Pramoj (1976)	37th
21		Dawee Chullasapya ทวี จุลละทรัพย์ (1909–2002)	20 April 1976	23 September 1976	Social Justice	Seni Pramoj (1976)	37th
(18)		Pramarn Adireksarn ประมาณ อดิเรกสาร (1913–2010)	25 September 1976	6 October 1976	Thai Nation	Seni Pramoj (1976)	38th
(17)		Sawet Piamphongsan เสวตร เปี่ยมพงศ์สานต์ (1909–2002)	25 September 1976	6 October 1976	Social Agrarian	Seni Pramoj (1976)	38th
(21)		Dawee Chullasapya ทวี จุลละทรัพย์ (1909–2002)	25 September 1976	6 October 1976	Social Justice	Seni Pramoj (1976)	38th
22		Prasit Kanchanawat ประสิทธิ์ กาญจนวัฒน์ (1909–2002)	25 September 1976	6 October 1976	Social Nationalist	Seni Pramoj (1976)	38th
23		Boonchai Bamroongpong บุญชัย บำรุงพงศ์ (1915–1995)	8 October 1976	19 October 1977	Independent	Thanin Kraivichien (1976–1977)	39th
24		Amphorn Chanatravichitra อัมพร จันทรวิจิตร (1925–2021)	8 October 1976	19 October 1977	Independent	Thanin Kraivichien (1976–1977)	39th
25		Sunthorn Hongladarom สุนทร หงส์ลดารมภ์ (1912–2005)	11 November 1977	21 December 1978	Independent	Kriangsak Chamanan (1977–1980)	40th
(23)		Boonchai Bamroongpong บุญชัย บำรุงพงศ์ (1915–1995)	11 November 1977	21 December 1978	Independent	Kriangsak Chamanan (1977–1980)	40th
26		Somphop Hotarakit สมภพ โหตระกิตย์ (1918–1997)	11 November 1977	21 December 1978	Independent	Kriangsak Chamanan (1977–1980)	40th
(21)		Dawee Chullasapya ทวี จุลละทรัพย์ (1909–2002)	12 May 1979	3 March 1980	Independent	Kriangsak Chamanan (1977–1980)	41st
27		Serm Na Nakhorn เสริม ณ นคร (1921–2009)	12 May 1979	3 March 1980	Independent	Kriangsak Chamanan (1977–1980)	41st
(26)		Somphop Hotarakit สมภพ โหตระกิตย์ (1918–1997)	12 May 1979	3 March 1980	Independent	Kriangsak Chamanan (1977–1980)	41st
28		Lek Neawmalee เล็ก แนวมาลี (1914–1993	12 May 1979	3 March 1980	Independent	Kriangsak Chamanan (1977–1980)	41st
(18)		Pramarn Adireksarn ประมาณ อดิเรกสาร (1913–2010)	3 March 1980	19 March 1983	Thai Nation	Prem Tinsulanonda (1980–1988)	42nd
(27)		Serm Na Nakhorn เสริม ณ นคร (1921–2009)	3 March 1980	19 March 1983	Independent	Prem Tinsulanonda (1980–1988)	42nd
29		Thanat Khoman ถนัด คอมันตร์ (1914–2016)	3 March 1980	28 February 1981	Democrat	Prem Tinsulanonda (1980–1988)	42nd
30		Boonchu Rojanastien บุญชู โรจนเสถียร (1921–2007)	3 March 1980	4 March 1981	Independent	Prem Tinsulanonda (1980–1988)	42nd
(29)		Thanat Khoman ถนัด คอมันตร์ (1914–2016)	11 March 1981	19 March 1983	Democrat	Prem Tinsulanonda (1980–1988)	42nd
31		Prachuab Soontarangkul ประจวบ สุนทรางกูร (1920–1992)	11 March 1981	19 March 1983	Independent	Prem Tinsulanonda (1980–1988)	42nd
32		Thongyod Chitaveera ทองหยด จิตตวีระ (1909–1991)	19 December 1981	19 March 1983	Social Action	Prem Tinsulanonda (1980–1988)	42nd
(31)		Prachuab Soontarangkul ประจวบ สุนทรางกูร (1920–1992)	30 April 1983	5 August 1986	Independent	Prem Tinsulanonda (1980–1988)	43rd
(20)		Boontheng Thongsawat บุญเท่ง ทองสวัสดิ์ (1912–1999)	30 April 1983	15 January 1986	Social Action	Prem Tinsulanonda (1980–1988)	43rd
33		Bhichai Rattakul พิชัย รัตตกุล (1924–2022)	30 April 1983	5 August 1986	Democrat	Prem Tinsulanonda (1980–1988)	43rd
34		Sonthi Bunyachai สนธิ บุณยะชัย (1917–2011)	30 April 1983	5 August 1986	Thai Citizen	Prem Tinsulanonda (1980–1988)	43rd
35		Siddhi Savetsila สิทธิ เศวตศิลา (1919–2015)	15 January 1986	5 August 1986	Social Action	Prem Tinsulanonda (1980–1988)	43rd
(33)		Bhichai Rattakul พิชัย รัตตกุล (1924–2022)	5 August 1986	3 August 1988	Democrat	Prem Tinsulanonda (1980–1988)	44th
36		Chatichai Choonhavan ชาติชาย ชุณหะวัณ (1920–1998)	5 August 1986	3 August 1988	Thai Nation	Prem Tinsulanonda (1980–1988)	44th
37		Pong Sarasin พงส์ สารสิน (1927–2021)	5 August 1986	3 August 1988	Thai Nation	Prem Tinsulanonda (1980–1988)	44th
(34)		Sonthi Bunyachai สนธิ บุณยะชัย (1917–2011)	5 August 1986	3 August 1988	Thai Citizen	Prem Tinsulanonda (1980–1988)	44th
38		Tienchai Sirisamphan เทียนชัย ศิริสัมพันธ์ (1924–2020)	5 August 1986	3 August 1988	People	Prem Tinsulanonda (1980–1988)	44th
(37)		Pong Sarasin พงส์ สารสิน (1927–2021)	4 August 1988	9 December 1990	Thai Nation	Chatichai Choonhavan (1988–1991)	45th
(33)		Bhichai Rattakul พิชัย รัตตกุล (1924–2022)	4 August 1988	9 December 1990	Democrat	Chatichai Choonhavan (1988–1991)	45th
38		Tienchai Sirisamphan เทียนชัย ศิริสัมพันธ์ (1924–2020)	4 August 1988	26 August 1990	People	Chatichai Choonhavan (1988–1991)	45th
39		Chuan Leekpai ชวน หลีกภัย (born 1938)	29 December 1989	26 August 1990	Democrat	Chatichai Choonhavan (1988–1991)	45th
40		Chavalit Yongchaiyudh ชวลิต ยงใจยุทธ (born 1932)	30 March 1990	21 June 1990	New Aspiration	Chatichai Choonhavan (1988–1991)	45th
41		Pramuan Saphawasu ประมวล สภาวสุ (1927–2002)	26 August 1990	9 December 1990	Thai Nation	Chatichai Choonhavan (1988–1991)	45th
42		Sanan Kachornprasart สนั่น ขจรประศาสน์ (1935–2013)	26 August 1990	9 December 1990	Democrat	Chatichai Choonhavan (1988–1991)	45th
43		Mana Rattanakoset มานะ รัตนโกเศศ (1925–2002)	26 August 1990	9 December 1990	People	Chatichai Choonhavan (1988–1991)	45th
(32)		Thongyod Chitaveera ทองหยด จิตตวีระ (1909–1991)	26 August 1990	9 December 1990	Social Action	Chatichai Choonhavan (1988–1991)	45th
44		Arthit Kamlang-ek อาทิตย์ กำลังเอก (1925–2015)	26 August 1990	9 December 1990	Thai People	Chatichai Choonhavan (1988–1991)	45th
45		Booneua Prasertsuwan บุญเอื้อ ประเสริฐสุวรรณ (1919–2016)	9 December 1990	23 February 1991	Thai Nation	Chatichai Choonhavan (1988–1991)	46th
46		Chalermpan Srivikorn เฉลิมพันธ์ ศรีวิกรม์ (1936–2011)	9 December 1990	23 February 1991	Solidarity	Chatichai Choonhavan (1988–1991)	46th
47		Kosol Krairerk โกศล ไกรฤกษ์ (1926–2004)	9 December 1990	23 February 1991	Thai Citizen	Chatichai Choonhavan (1988–1991)	46th
(43)		Mana Rattanakoset มานะ รัตนโกเศศ (1925–2002)	9 December 1990	23 February 1991	People	Chatichai Choonhavan (1988–1991)	46th
(44)		Arthit Kamlang-ek อาทิตย์ กำลังเอก (1925–2015)	9 December 1990	23 February 1991	Thai People	Chatichai Choonhavan (1988–1991)	46th
48		Sango Aunakul เสนาะ อูนากูล (born 1931)	2 March 1991	22 March 1992	Independent	Anand Panyarachun (1991–1992)	47th
49		Pao Sarasin เภา สารสิน (1929–2013)	2 March 1991	22 March 1992	Independent	Anand Panyarachun (1991–1992)	47th
50		Meechai Ruchuphan (Note: Acting Prime Minister from 24 May 1992.) มีชัย ฤชุพันธุ์ (born 1938)	2 March 1991	22 March 1992	Independent	Anand Panyarachun (1991–1992)	47th
50		Meechai Ruchuphan มีชัย ฤชุพันธุ์ (born 1938)	7 April 1992	9 June 1992	Independent	Suchinda Kraprayoon (1992)	48th
51		Narong Wongwan ณรงค์ วงศ์วรรณ (1925–2020)	7 April 1992	9 June 1992	Justice Unity	Suchinda Kraprayoon (1992)	48th
52		Somboon Rahong สมบุญ ระหงษ์ (1932–2013)	7 April 1992	9 June 1992	Thai Nation	Suchinda Kraprayoon (1992)	48th
53		Montree Pongpanich มนตรี พงษ์พานิช (1943–2000)	7 April 1992	9 June 1992	Social Action	Suchinda Kraprayoon (1992)	48th
54		Samak Sundaravej สมัคร สุนทรเวช (1935–2009)	7 April 1992	9 June 1992	Thai Citizen	Suchinda Kraprayoon (1992)	48th
(49)		Pao Sarasin เภา สารสิน (1929–2013)	10 June 1992	22 September 1992	Independent	Anand Panyarachun (1992)	49th
55		Kasem Suwanakul เกษม สุวรรณกุล (born 1930)	10 June 1992	22 September 1992	Independent	Anand Panyarachun (1992)	49th
56		Kasem S. Kasemsri หม่อมราชวงศ์เกษมสโมสร เกษมศรี (born 1930)	10 June 1992	22 September 1992	Thai Nation	Anand Panyarachun (1992)	49th
57		Banyat Bantadtan บัญญัติ บรรทัดฐาน (born 1942)	23 September 1992	12 July 1995	Democrat	Chuan Leekpai (1992–1995)	50th
58		Amnuay Viravan อำนวย วีรวรรณ (1932–2023)	23 September 1992	8 July 1994	Nam Thai	Chuan Leekpai (1992–1995)	50th
(30)		Boonchu Rojanastien บุญชู โรจนเสถียร (1921–2007)	23 September 1992	25 October 1994	Palang Dharma	Chuan Leekpai (1992–1995)	50th
59		Supachai Panitchpakdi ศุภชัย พานิชภักดิ์ (born 1946)	23 September 1992	12 July 1995	Democrat	Chuan Leekpai (1992–1995)	50th
(40)		Chavalit Yongchaiyudh ชวลิต ยงใจยุทธ (born 1932)	14 July 1994	25 October 1994	New Aspiration	Chuan Leekpai (1992–1995)	50th
60		Sukavich Rangsitpol สุขวิช รังสิตพล (born 1935)	25 October 1994	11 December 1994	New Aspiration	Chuan Leekpai (1992–1995)	50th
61		Chamlong Srimuang จำลอง ศรีเมือง (born 1935)	25 October 1994	19 May 1995	Palang Dharma	Chuan Leekpai (1992–1995)	50th
(44)		Arthit Kamlang-ek อาทิตย์ กำลังเอก (1925–2015)	17 December 1994	12 July 1995	National Development	Chuan Leekpai (1992–1995)	50th
(52)		Somboon Rahong สมบุญ ระหงษ์ (1932–2013)	13 July 1995	24 November 1996	Thai Nation	Banharn Silpa-archa (1995–1996)	51st
(40)		Chavalit Yongchaiyudh ชวลิต ยงใจยุทธ (born 1932)	13 July 1995	24 November 1996	New Aspiration	Banharn Silpa-archa (1995–1996)	51st
62		Thaksin Shinawatra ทักษิณ ชินวัตร (born 1949)	13 July 1995	24 May 1996	Palang Dharma	Banharn Silpa-archa (1995–1996)	51st
63		Boonpan Kaewattana บุญพันธ์ แขวัฒนะ (born 1930)	13 July 1995	28 February 1996	Social Action	Banharn Silpa-archa (1995–1996)	51st
(54)		Samak Sundaravej สมัคร สุนทรเวช (1935–2009)	13 July 1995	15 June 1996	Thai Citizen	Banharn Silpa-archa (1995–1996)	51st
(58)		Amnuay Viravan อำนวย วีรวรรณ (1932–2023)	13 July 1995	24 November 1996	Nam Thai	Banharn Silpa-archa (1995–1996)	51st
(53)		Montree Pongpanich มนตรี พงษ์พานิช (1943–2000)	28 February 1996	24 November 1996	Social Action	Banharn Silpa-archa (1995–1996)	51st
(62)		Thaksin Shinawatra ทักษิณ ชินวัตร (born 1949)	28 May 1996	14 August 1996	Palang Dharma	Banharn Silpa-archa (1995–1996)	51st
(54)		Samak Sundaravej สมัคร สุนทรเวช (1935–2009)	3 July 1996	24 November 1996	Thai Citizen	Banharn Silpa-archa (1995–1996)	51st
(56)		Kasem S. Kasemsri หม่อมราชวงศ์เกษมสโมสร เกษมศรี (born 1930)	27 September 1996	24 November 1996	Thai Nation	Banharn Silpa-archa (1995–1996)	51st
(60)		Sukavich Rangsitpol สุขวิช รังสิตพล (born 1935)	25 November 1996	8 November 1997	New Aspiration	Chavalit Yongchaiyudh (1996–1997)	52nd
(58)		Amnuay Viravan อำนวย วีรวรรณ (1932–2023)	25 November 1996	21 June 1997	Nam Thai	Chavalit Yongchaiyudh (1996–1997)	52nd
64		Korn Dabbaransi กร ทัพพะรังสี (born 1945)	25 November 1996	8 November 1997	National Development	Chavalit Yongchaiyudh (1996–1997)	52nd
(53)		Montree Pongpanich มนตรี พงษ์พานิช (1943–2000)	25 November 1996	24 October 1997	Social Action	Chavalit Yongchaiyudh (1996–1997)	52nd
(54)		Samak Sundaravej สมัคร สุนทรเวช (1935–2009)	25 November 1996	8 November 1997	Thai Citizen	Chavalit Yongchaiyudh (1996–1997)	52nd
(62)		Thaksin Shinawatra ทักษิณ ชินวัตร (born 1949)	15 August 1997	8 November 1997	Palang Dharma	Chavalit Yongchaiyudh (1996–1997)	52nd
65		Wiraphong Ramangkun วีรพงษ์ รามางกูร (1943–2021)	15 August 1997	8 November 1997	Independent	Chavalit Yongchaiyudh (1996–1997)	52nd
66		Suwit Khunkitti สุวิทย์ คุณกิตติ (born 1957)	24 October 1997	8 November 1997	Social Action	Chavalit Yongchaiyudh (1996–1997)	52nd
(33)		Bhichai Rattakul พิชัย รัตตกุล (1924–2022)	14 November 1997	28 June 2000	Democrat	Chuan Leekpai (1997–2001)	53rd
(59)		Supachai Panitchpakdi ศุภชัย พานิชภักดิ์ (born 1946)	14 November 1997	9 November 2000	Democrat	Chuan Leekpai (1997–2001)	53rd
67		Panja Kesornthong ปัญจะ เกสรทอง (born 1946)	14 November 1997	9 April 2000	Thai Nation	Chuan Leekpai (1997–2001)	53rd
(66)		Suwit Khunkitti สุวิทย์ คุณกิตติ (born 1957)	14 November 1997	29 June 1999	Social Action	Chuan Leekpai (1997–2001)	53rd
(64)		Korn Dabbaransi กร ทัพพะรังสี (born 1945)	5 October 1998	9 November 2000	National Development	Chuan Leekpai (1997–2001)	53rd
(42)		Sanan Kachornprasart สนั่น ขจรประศาสน์ (1935–2013)	5 October 1998	29 March 2000	Democrat	Chuan Leekpai (1997–2001)	53rd
68		Trairong Suwankiri ไตรรงค์ สุวรรณคีรี (born 1944)	9 July 1999	9 November 2000	Democrat	Chuan Leekpai (1997–2001)	53rd
(57)		Banyat Bantadtan บัญญัติ บรรทัดฐาน (born 1942)	11 April 2000	9 November 2000	Democrat	Chuan Leekpai (1997–2001)	53rd
69		Wirode Pao-In วิโรจน์ เปาอินทร์ (born 1933)	11 April 2000	9 November 2000	Thai Nation	Chuan Leekpai (1997–2001)	53rd
70		Suthas Ngernmuen สุทัศน์ เงินหมื่น (born 1945)	8 September 2000	9 November 2000	Democrat	Chuan Leekpai (1997–2001)	53rd
(40)		Chavalit Yongchaiyudh ชวลิต ยงใจยุทธ (born 1932)	17 February 2001	11 March 2005	New Aspiration (until 2002)	Thaksin Shinawatra (2001–2006)	54th
(40)		Chavalit Yongchaiyudh ชวลิต ยงใจยุทธ (born 1932)	17 February 2001	11 March 2005	Thai Rak Thai (from 2002)	Thaksin Shinawatra (2001–2006)	54th
(66)		Suwit Khunkitti สุวิทย์ คุณกิตติ (born 1957)	17 February 2001	9 October 2001	Thai Rak Thai	Thaksin Shinawatra (2001–2006)	54th
71		Dej Boonlang เดช บุญ-หลง (1930–2010)	17 February 2001	11 March 2005	Thai Nation	Thaksin Shinawatra (2001–2006)	54th
72		Pongpol Adireksarn ปองพล อดิเรกสาร (born 1942)	17 February 2001	3 October 2002	Thai Rak Thai	Thaksin Shinawatra (2001–2006)	54th
73		Pitak Indravithayanond พิทักษ์ อินทรวิทยนันท์ (born 1943)	17 February 2001	11 March 2005	Thai Rak Thai	Thaksin Shinawatra (2001–2006)	54th
74		Somkid Jatusripitak สมคิด จาตุศรีพิทักษ์ (born 1953)	9 October 2001	3 October 2002	Thai Rak Thai	Thaksin Shinawatra (2001–2006)	54th
(64)		Korn Dabbaransi กร ทัพพะรังสี (born 1945)	5 March 2002	8 November 2003	National Development	Thaksin Shinawatra (2001–2006)	54th
(66)		Suwit Khunkitti สุวิทย์ คุณกิตติ (born 1957)	3 October 2002	11 August 2004	Thai Rak Thai	Thaksin Shinawatra (2001–2006)	54th
75		Chaturon Chaisang จาตุรนต์ ฉายแสง (born 1956)	3 October 2002	11 March 2005	Thai Rak Thai	Thaksin Shinawatra (2001–2006)	54th
76		Prommin Lertsuridej พรหมินทร์ เลิศสุริย์เดช (born 1954)	3 October 2002	8 February 2003	Thai Rak Thai	Thaksin Shinawatra (2001–2006)	54th
77		Wissanu Krea-ngam วิษณุ เครืองาม (born 1951)	3 October 2002	11 March 2005	Independent	Thaksin Shinawatra (2001–2006)	54th
(74)		Somkid Jatusripitak สมคิด จาตุศรีพิทักษ์ (born 1953)	8 February 2003	10 March 2004	Thai Rak Thai	Thaksin Shinawatra (2001–2006)	54th
78		Purachai Piumsomboon ปุระชัย เปี่ยมสมบูรณ์ (born 1950)	8 February 2003	11 March 2005	Thai Rak Thai	Thaksin Shinawatra (2001–2006)	54th
79		Pokin Palakul โภคิน พลกุล (born 1952)	8 November 2003	11 August 2004	Thai Rak Thai	Thaksin Shinawatra (2001–2006)	54th
80		Suchart Chaovisith สุชาติ เชาว์วิศิษฐ (1940–2009)	10 March 2004	5 October 2004	Thai Rak Thai	Thaksin Shinawatra (2001–2006)	54th
81		Thammarak Isarangkura na Ayudhaya ธรรมรักษ์ อิศรางกูร ณ อยุธยา (born 1938)	10 March 2004	5 October 2004	Thai Rak Thai	Thaksin Shinawatra (2001–2006)	54th
82		Wan Muhamad Noor Matha วันมูหะมัดนอร์ มะทา (born 1944)	10 March 2004	6 October 2004	Thai Rak Thai	Thaksin Shinawatra (2001–2006)	54th
83		Suwat Liptapanlop สุวัจน์ ลิปตพัลลภ (born 1955)	30 June 2004	11 March 2005	Thai Rak Thai	Thaksin Shinawatra (2001–2006)	54th
84		Phinij Jarusombat พินิจ จารุสมบัติ (born 1951)	6 October 2004	11 March 2005	Thai Rak Thai	Thaksin Shinawatra (2001–2006)	54th
85		Somsak Thepsuthin สมศักดิ์ เทพสุทิน (born 1955)	6 October 2004	11 March 2005	Thai Rak Thai	Thaksin Shinawatra (2001–2006)	54th
86		Chitchai Wannasathit (Note: Acting Prime Minister from 5 April until 23 May 2006.) ชิดชัย วรรณสถิตย์ (born 1946)	11 March 2005	19 September 2006	Thai Rak Thai	Thaksin Shinawatra (2001–2006)	55th
(74)		Somkid Jatusripitak สมคิด จาตุศรีพิทักษ์ (born 1953)	11 March 2005	19 September 2006	Thai Rak Thai	Thaksin Shinawatra (2001–2006)	55th
(75)		Chaturon Chaisang จาตุรนต์ ฉายแสง (born 1956)	11 March 2005	19 September 2006	Thai Rak Thai	Thaksin Shinawatra (2001–2006)	55th
87		Surakiart Sathirathai สุรเกียรติ์ เสถียรไทย (born 1958)	11 March 2005	19 September 2006	Thai Rak Thai	Thaksin Shinawatra (2001–2006)	55th
(84)		Phinij Jarusombat พินิจ จารุสมบัติ (born 1951)	11 March 2005	31 October 2005	Thai Rak Thai	Thaksin Shinawatra (2001–2006)	55th
(77)		Wissanu Krea-ngam วิษณุ เครืองาม (born 1951)	11 March 2005	24 June 2006	Independent	Thaksin Shinawatra (2001–2006)	55th
88		Suriya Juangroongruangkit สุริยะ จึงรุ่งเรืองกิจ (born 1954)	2 August 2005	19 September 2006	Thai Rak Thai	Thaksin Shinawatra (2001–2006)	55th
(83)		Suwat Liptapanlop สุวัจน์ ลิปตพัลลภ (born 1955)	2 August 2005	19 September 2006	Thai Rak Thai	Thaksin Shinawatra (2001–2006)	55th
89		Suchai Charoenratanakul สุชัย เจริญรัตนกุล (born 1955)	31 October 2005	19 September 2006	Thai Rak Thai	Thaksin Shinawatra (2001–2006)	55th
90		Pridiyathorn Devakula หม่อมราชวงศ์ปรีดิยาธร เทวกุล (born 1947)	8 October 2006	28 February 2007	Independent	Surayud Chulanont (2006–2008)	56th
91		Kosit Panpiemras โฆสิต ปั้นเปี่ยมรัษฎ์ (1943–2016)	8 October 2006	6 February 2008	Independent	Surayud Chulanont (2006–2008)	56th
92		Phaiboon Watthanasiritham ไพบูลย์ วัฒนศิริธรรม (1941–2012)	7 March 2007	6 February 2008	Independent	Surayud Chulanont (2006–2008)	56th
93		Sonthi Boonyaratglin สนธิ บุญยรัตกลิน (born 1946)	1 October 2007	28 January 2008	Independent	Surayud Chulanont (2006–2008)	56th
94		Somchai Wongsawat สมชาย วงศ์สวัสดิ์ (born 1947)	6 February 2008	24 September 2008	People's Power	Samak Sundaravej (2008)	57th
95		Mingkwan Saengsuwan มิ่งขวัญ แสงสุวรรณ (born 1952)	6 February 2008	24 September 2008	People's Power	Samak Sundaravej (2008)	57th
96		Sooraphong Suebwonglee สุรพงษ์ สืบวงศ์ลี (born 1952)	6 February 2008	24 September 2008	People's Power	Samak Sundaravej (2008)	57th
97		Sahas Banditkul สหัส บัณฑิตกุล (born 1952)	6 February 2008	24 September 2008	Independent	Samak Sundaravej (2008)	57th
(42)		Sanan Kachornprasart สนั่น ขจรประศาสน์ (1935–2013)	6 February 2008	24 September 2008	Thai Nation	Samak Sundaravej (2008)	57th
(66)		Suwit Khunkitti สุวิทย์ คุณกิตติ (born 1957)	6 February 2008	2 August 2008	Puea Pandin	Samak Sundaravej (2008)	57th
98		Kowit Wattana โกวิท วัฒนะ (1947–2025)	2 August 2008	24 September 2008	People's Power	Samak Sundaravej (2008)	57th
99		Man Phatnothai มั่น พัธโนทัย (1941–2026)	2 August 2008	24 September 2008	Puea Pandin	Samak Sundaravej (2008)	57th
100		Chavarat Charnvirakul (Note: Acting Prime Minister from 2 December 2008.) ชวรัตน์ ชาญวีรกูล (born 1936)	24 September 2008	19 December 2008	People's Power	Somchai Wongsawat (2008)	58th
(40)		Chavalit Yongchaiyudh ชวลิต ยงใจยุทธ (born 1932)	24 September 2008	7 October 2008	People's Power	Somchai Wongsawat (2008)	58th
101		Sompong Amornwiwat สมพงษ์ อมรวิวัฒน์ (born 1941)	24 September 2008	2 December 2008	People's Power	Somchai Wongsawat (2008)	58th
102		Olarn Chaipravat โอฬาร ไชยประวัติ (born 1944)	24 September 2008	19 December 2008	People's Power	Somchai Wongsawat (2008)	58th
(42)		Sanan Kachornprasart สนั่น ขจรประศาสน์ (1935–2013)	24 September 2008	19 December 2008	Thai Nation	Somchai Wongsawat (2008)	58th
103		Suthep Thaugsuban สุเทพ เทือกสุบรรณ (born 1949)	20 December 2008	8 October 2010	Democrat	Abhisit Vejjajiva (2008–2011)	59th
104		Kobsak Sabhavasu กอร์ปศักดิ์ สภาวสุ (born 1949)	20 December 2008	11 January 2010	Democrat	Abhisit Vejjajiva (2008–2011)	59th
(42)		Sanan Kachornprasart สนั่น ขจรประศาสน์ (1935–2013)	20 December 2008	8 August 2011	Chart Thai Pattana	Abhisit Vejjajiva (2008–2011)	59th
(68)		Trairong Suwankiri ไตรรงค์ สุวรรณคีรี (born 1944)	15 January 2010	8 August 2011	Democrat	Abhisit Vejjajiva (2008–2011)	59th
(103)		Suthep Thaugsuban สุเทพ เทือกสุบรรณ (born 1949)	15 November 2010	8 August 2011	Democrat	Abhisit Vejjajiva (2008–2011)	59th
105		Yongyuth Wichaidit ยงยุทธ วิชัยดิษฐ (born 1942)	9 August 2011	1 October 2012	Pheu Thai	Yingluck Shinawatra (2011–2014)	60th
106		Chalerm Yubamrung เฉลิม อยู่บำรุง (born 1947)	9 August 2011	30 June 2013	Pheu Thai	Yingluck Shinawatra (2011–2014)	60th
(98)		Kowit Wattana โกวิท วัฒนะ (1947–2025)	9 August 2011	18 January 2012	Pheu Thai	Yingluck Shinawatra (2011–2014)	60th
107		Kittiratt Na-Ranong กิตติรัตน์ ณ ระนอง (born 1958)	9 August 2011	7 May 2014	Pheu Thai	Yingluck Shinawatra (2011–2014)	60th
108		Chumpol Silpa-archa ชุมพล ศิลปอาชา (1940–2013)	9 August 2011	21 January 2013	Chart Thai Pattana	Yingluck Shinawatra (2011–2014)	60th
109		Yuthasak Sasiprapha ยุทธศักดิ์ ศศิประภา (born 1937)	18 January 2012	27 October 2012	Pheu Thai	Yingluck Shinawatra (2011–2014)	60th
110		Surapong Tovichakchaikul ยุทธศักดิ์ ศศิประภา (1953–2020)	27 October 2012	7 May 2014	Pheu Thai	Yingluck Shinawatra (2011–2014)	60th
111		Plodprasop Suraswadi ปลอดประสพ สุรัสวดี (born 1945)	27 October 2012	7 May 2014	Pheu Thai	Yingluck Shinawatra (2011–2014)	60th
112		Phongthep Thepkanjana พงศ์เทพ เทพกาญจนา (born 1956)	27 October 2012	22 May 2014	Pheu Thai	Yingluck Shinawatra (2011–2014)	60th
113		Yukol Limlaemthong ยุคล ลิ้มแหลมทอง (born 1950)	2 April 2013	22 May 2014	Chart Thai Pattana	Yingluck Shinawatra (2011–2014)	60th
114		Niwatthamrong Boonsongpaisan (Note: Acting Prime Minister from 7 May 2014.) นิวัฒน์ธำรง บุญทรงไพศาล (born 1948)	30 June 2013	22 May 2014	Pheu Thai	Yingluck Shinawatra (2011–2014)	60th
115		Pracha Phromnok ประชา พรหมนอก (born 1942)	30 June 2013	22 May 2014	Pheu Thai	Yingluck Shinawatra (2011–2014)	60th
116		Prawit Wongsuwon ประวิตร วงษ์สุวรรณ (born 1945)	30 August 2014	10 July 2019	Independent	Prayut Chan-o-cha (2014–2023)	61st
(90)		Pridiyathorn Devakula หม่อมราชวงศ์ปรีดิยาธร เทวกุล (born 1947)	30 August 2014	19 August 2015	Independent	Prayut Chan-o-cha (2014–2023)	61st
117		Yongyuth Yuthavong ยงยุทธ ยุทธวงศ์ (born 1944)	30 August 2014	19 August 2015	Independent	Prayut Chan-o-cha (2014–2023)	61st
118		Thanasak Patimaprakorn ธนะศักดิ์ ปฏิมาประกร (born 1953)	30 August 2014	23 November 2017	Independent	Prayut Chan-o-cha (2014–2023)	61st
(77)		Wissanu Krea-ngam วิษณุ เครืองาม (born 1951)	30 August 2014	10 July 2019	Independent	Prayut Chan-o-cha (2014–2023)	61st
119		Prajin Juntong ประจิน จั่นตอง (born 1954)	19 August 2015	9 May 2019	Independent	Prayut Chan-o-cha (2014–2023)	61st
120		Narong Pipathanasai ณรงค์ พิพัฒนาศัย (born 1953)	19 August 2015	23 November 2017	Independent	Prayut Chan-o-cha (2014–2023)	61st
(74)		Somkid Jatusripitak สมคิด จาตุศรีพิทักษ์ (born 1953)	19 August 2015	10 July 2019	Independent (until 2018)	Prayut Chan-o-cha (2014–2023)	61st
(74)		Somkid Jatusripitak สมคิด จาตุศรีพิทักษ์ (born 1953)	19 August 2015	10 July 2019	Palang Pracharath (from 2018)	Prayut Chan-o-cha (2014–2023)	61st
121		Chatchai Sarikulya ฉัตรชัย สาริกัลยะ (born 1955)	23 November 2017	8 May 2019	Independent	Prayut Chan-o-cha (2014–2023)	61st
116		Prawit Wongsuwon (Note: Acting Prime Minister from 24 August until 30 September 2022.) ประวิตร วงษ์สุวรรณ (born 1945)	10 July 2019	1 September 2023	Independent (until 2019)	Prayut Chan-o-cha (2014–2023)	62nd
116		Prawit Wongsuwon ประวิตร วงษ์สุวรรณ (born 1945)	10 July 2019	1 September 2023	Palang Pracharath (from 2019)	Prayut Chan-o-cha (2014–2023)	62nd
(74)		Somkid Jatusripitak สมคิด จาตุศรีพิทักษ์ (born 1953)	10 July 2019	14 July 2020	Palang Pracharath	Prayut Chan-o-cha (2014–2023)	62nd
(77)		Wissanu Krea-ngam วิษณุ เครืองาม (born 1951)	10 July 2019	1 September 2023	Independent	Prayut Chan-o-cha (2014–2023)	62nd
122		Jurin Laksanawisit จุรินทร์ ลักษณวิศิษฎ์ (born 1956)	10 July 2019	1 September 2023	Democrat	Prayut Chan-o-cha (2014–2023)	62nd
123		Anutin Charnvirakul อนุทิน ชาญวีรกูล (born 1966)	10 July 2019	1 September 2023	Bhumjaithai	Prayut Chan-o-cha (2014–2023)	62nd
124		Don Pramudwinai ดอน ปรมัตถ์วินัย (born 1950)	5 August 2020	1 September 2023	Independent	Prayut Chan-o-cha (2014–2023)	62nd
125		Supattanapong Punmeechaow สุพัฒนพงษ์ พันธ์มีเชาว์ (born 1960)	5 August 2020	1 September 2023	Independent (until 2023)	Prayut Chan-o-cha (2014–2023)	62nd
125		Supattanapong Punmeechaow สุพัฒนพงษ์ พันธ์มีเชาว์ (born 1960)	5 August 2020	1 September 2023	United Thai Nation (from 2023)	Prayut Chan-o-cha (2014–2023)	62nd
126		Phumtham Wechayachai (Note: Acting Prime Minister from 14 August 2024.) ภูมิธรรม เวชชยชัย (born 1953)	1 September 2023	3 September 2024	Pheu Thai	Srettha Thavisin (2023–2024)	63rd
(85)		Somsak Thepsuthin สมศักดิ์ เทพสุทิน (born 1955)	1 September 2023	27 April 2024	Pheu Thai	Srettha Thavisin (2023–2024)	63rd
127		Parnpree Bahiddha-nukara ปานปรีย์ พหิทธานุกร (born 1957)	1 September 2023	27 April 2024	Pheu Thai	Srettha Thavisin (2023–2024)	63rd
(123)		Anutin Charnvirakul อนุทิน ชาญวีรกูล (born 1966)	1 September 2023	3 September 2024	Bhumjaithai	Srettha Thavisin (2023–2024)	63rd
128		Patcharawat Wongsuwon พัชรวาท วงษ์สุวรรณ (born 1948)	1 September 2023	3 September 2024	Palang Pracharath	Srettha Thavisin (2023–2024)	63rd
129		Pirapan Salirathavibhaga พีระพันธุ์ สาลีรัฐวิภาค (born 1959)	1 September 2023	3 September 2024	United Thai Nation	Srettha Thavisin (2023–2024)	63rd
(88)		Suriya Juangroongruangkit สุริยะ จึงรุ่งเรืองกิจ (born 1954)	27 April 2024	3 September 2024	Pheu Thai	Srettha Thavisin (2023–2024)	63rd
130		Pichai Chunhavajira พิชัย ชุณหวชิร (born 1949)	27 April 2024	3 September 2024	Pheu Thai	Srettha Thavisin (2023–2024)	63rd
(126)		Phumtham Wechayachai (Note: Acting Prime Minister from 3 July 2025.) ภูมิธรรม เวชชยชัย (born 1953)	3 September 2024	19 September 2025	Pheu Thai	Paetongtarn Shinawatra (2024–2025)	64th
(88)		Suriya Juangroongruangkit (Note: Acting Prime Minister from 1 July until 3 July 2025.) สุริยะ จึงรุ่งเรืองกิจ (born 1954)	3 September 2024	19 September 2025	Pheu Thai	Paetongtarn Shinawatra (2024–2025)	64th
(123)		Anutin Charnvirakul อนุทิน ชาญวีรกูล (born 1966)	3 September 2024	19 June 2025	Bhumjaithai	Paetongtarn Shinawatra (2024–2025)	64th
(129)		Pirapan Salirathavibhaga พีระพันธุ์ สาลีรัฐวิภาค (born 1959)	3 September 2024	19 September 2025	United Thai Nation	Paetongtarn Shinawatra (2024–2025)	64th
(130)		Pichai Chunhavajira พิชัย ชุณหวชิร (born 1949)	3 September 2024	19 September 2025	Pheu Thai	Paetongtarn Shinawatra (2024–2025)	64th
131		Prasert Jantararuangtong ประเสริฐ จันทรรวงทอง (born 1960)	3 September 2024	19 September 2025	Pheu Thai	Paetongtarn Shinawatra (2024–2025)	64th
132		Phipat Ratchakitprakarn พิพัฒน์ รัชกิจประการ (born 1955)	19 September 2025	30 March 2026	Bhumjaithai	Anutin Charnvirakul (since 2025)	65th
133		Sophon Saram โสภณ ซารัมย์ (born 1959)	19 September 2025	16 March 2026	Bhumjaithai	Anutin Charnvirakul (since 2025)	65th
134		Borwornsak Uwanno บวรศักดิ์ อุวรรณโณ (born 1954)	19 September 2025	30 March 2026	Independent	Anutin Charnvirakul (since 2025)	65th
135		Ekniti Nitithanprapas เอกนิติ นิติทัณฑ์ประภาศ (born 1971)	19 September 2025	30 March 2026	Independent (until 2025)	Anutin Charnvirakul (since 2025)	65th
135		Ekniti Nitithanprapas เอกนิติ นิติทัณฑ์ประภาศ (born 1971)	19 September 2025	30 March 2026	Bhumjaithai (from 2025)	Anutin Charnvirakul (since 2025)	65th
136		Thamanat Prompow ธรรมนัส พรหมเผ่า (born 1965)	19 September 2025	30 March 2026	Kla Tham	Anutin Charnvirakul (since 2025)	65th
137		Suchart Chomklin สุชาติ ชมกลิ่น (born 1974)	19 September 2025	30 March 2026	United Thai Nation (until 2025)	Anutin Charnvirakul (since 2025)	65th
137		Suchart Chomklin สุชาติ ชมกลิ่น (born 1974)	19 September 2025	30 March 2026	Bhumjaithai (from 2025)	Anutin Charnvirakul (since 2025)	65th
(132)		Phipat Ratchakitprakarn พิพัฒน์ รัชกิจประการ (born 1955)	30 March 2026	Incumbent	Bhumjaithai	Anutin Charnvirakul (since 2025)	66th
138		Songsak Thongsri ทรงศักดิ์ ทองศรี (born 1958)	30 March 2026	Incumbent	Bhumjaithai	Anutin Charnvirakul (since 2025)	66th
(135)		Ekniti Nitithanprapas เอกนิติ นิติทัณฑ์ประภาศ (born 1971)	30 March 2026	Incumbent	Bhumjaithai	Anutin Charnvirakul (since 2025)	66th
139		Sihasak Phuangketkeow สีหศักดิ์ พวงเกตุแก้ว (born 1971)	30 March 2026	Incumbent	Bhumjaithai	Anutin Charnvirakul (since 2025)	66th
140		Suphajee Suthumpun ศุภจี สุธรรมพันธุ์ (born 1964)	30 March 2026	Incumbent	Bhumjaithai	Anutin Charnvirakul (since 2025)	66th
141		Pakorn Nilprapunt ปกรณ์ นิลประพันธ์ (born 1968)	30 March 2026	Incumbent	Independent	Anutin Charnvirakul (since 2025)	66th
142		Yodchanan Wongsawat ยศชนัน วงศ์สวัสดิ์ (born 1979)	30 March 2026	Incumbent	Pheu Thai	Anutin Charnvirakul (since 2025)	66th
