= Seri Manangkhasila Party =

Former political party in Thailand

Seri Manangkhasila Party พรรคเสรีมนังคศิลา
- Leader: Plaek Phibunsongkhram
- Secretary-General: Phao Siyanon
- Deputy leaders: Fuen Ronnaphagrad Ritthakhanee; Sarit Thanarat
- Founded: 29 September 1955
- Dissolved: 21 December 1957
- Merged into: National Socialist Party
- Headquarters: Bangkok
- Ideology: Catch-all party; Thai nationalism; Liberalism (theory); Authoritarianism (practically); Militarism; Fascism; Anti-communism; Anti-Chinese sentiment; Populism; Rajakru's faction; Statism; Crony capitalism; Pro-Royal Thai Police; Sisao's faction; Paternalistic conservatism; Monarchism; Pro-Royal Thai Army
- Political position: Far-right
- Anthem: "กราวเสรีมนังคศิลา" (Seri Manangkhasila March)

The Seri Manangkhasila Party (Thai: พรรคเสรีมนังคศิลา RTGS: Phak Seri Manangkhasila) was a short-lived pro-military political party in Thailand. It was founded on 29 September 1955 by Field Marshal Plaek Phibunsongkhram.

== History ==
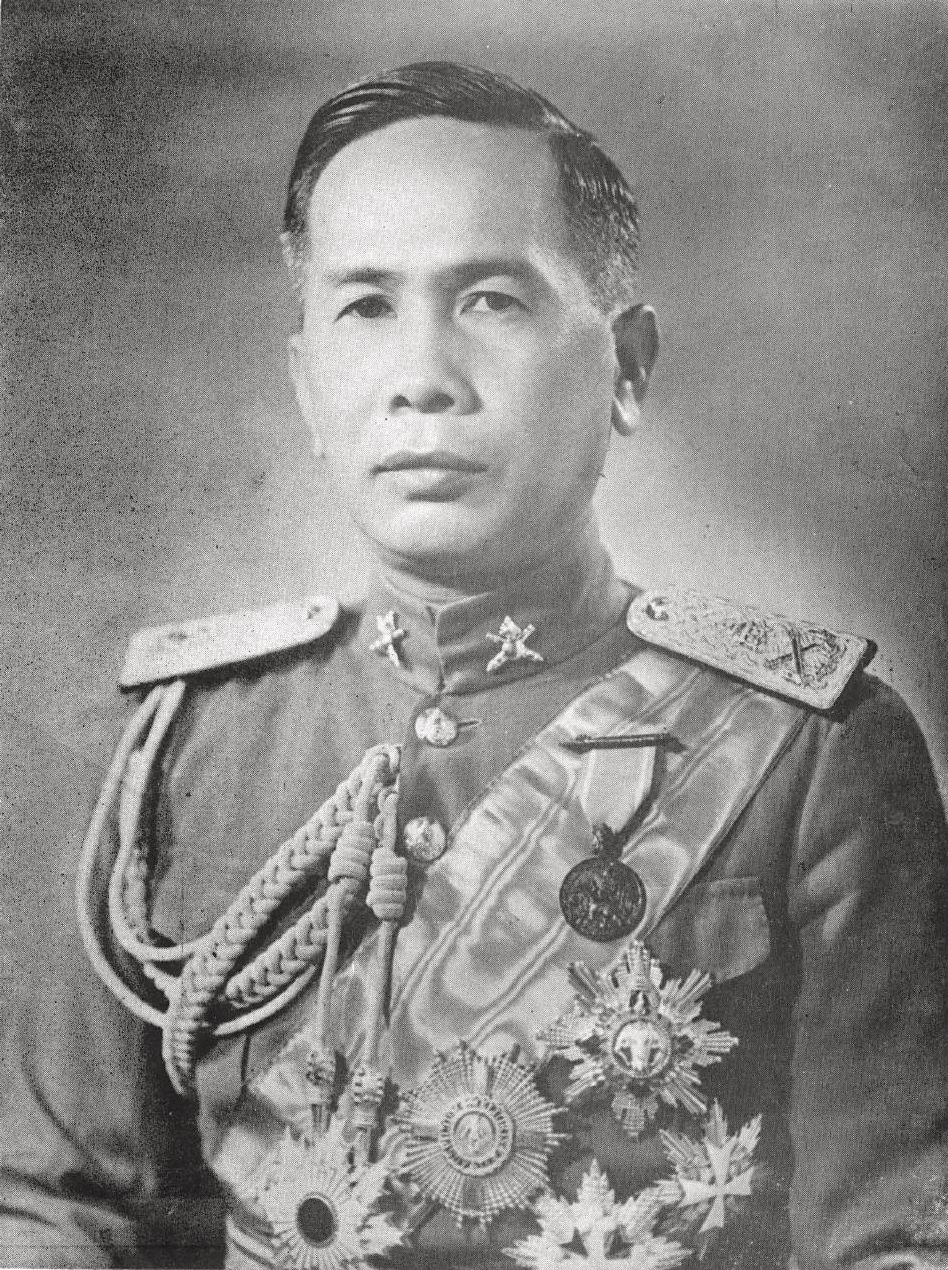
The party leader Field Marshal Plaek Phibunsongkram

The party was established on 29 September 1955 as the first political party registered after the announcement of the Political Parties Act, B.E. 1955, with Field Marshal Plaek Phibunsongkram, Prime Minister, as the party leader. The party secretary was Pol. Gen Phao Sriyanond, the Director of the Police Department. The deputy leaders of the party were Field Marshal Sarit Thanarat, Commander-in-Chief of the Royal Thai Army, and Air Marshal Fuen Ronnaphagrad Ritthakhanee, Commander of the Royal Thai Air Force, with the party head office located at Manangkhasila House.

In the election on 16 February 1957, the Seri Manangkhasila Party won the most seats with 85 MPs. However, after a conflict within the party, Field Marshal Sarit Thanarat, along with a number of MPs, resigned from the party. From then on, Field Marshal Sarit encouraged Sukich Nimmanhaemin to establish a new political party named the Sahaphum Party. After Field Marshal Sarit conducted a coup against the Government of Field Marshal Plaek Phibulsongkram on 16 September 1957, he was appointed as a guardian of the military department and appointed Pote Sarasin as Prime Minister and held a new election on Sunday 15 December 1957.

In this election, the Seri Manangkhasila Party won only 4 seats out of the 160 which were directly elected. Soon, the Seri Manangkhasila Party was dissolved and merged with the National Socialist Party, which had Field Marshal Sarit as the party leader, along with the Sahaphum Party on 21 December 1957.
