= National Socialist Party (Thailand) =

Former political party in Thailand

National Socialist Party พรรคชาติสังคม
- Leader: Sarit Thanarat
- Secretary-General: Praphas Charusathien
- Deputy-Leader: Thanom Kittikachorn; Sukich Nimmanheminda
- Founded: 21 December 1957
- Dissolved: 20 October 1958
- Merger of: Sahaphum Party; Seri Manangkhasila Party
- Headquarters: Bangkok
- Ideology: National conservatism Militarism; Monarchism; Anti-communism
- Political position: Far-right

National Socialist Party (Thai: พรรคชาติสังคม RTGS: Phak Chat Sangkhom) was a short-lived pro-military political party in Thailand. It was founded on 21 December 1957 by Field Marshal Sarit Thanarat.

== History ==
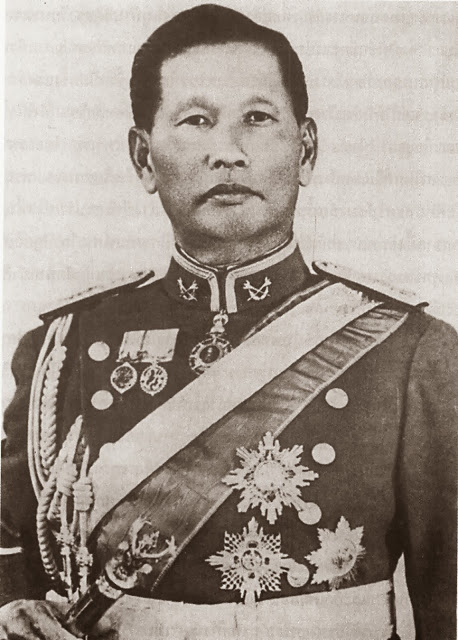
Party leader Sarit Thanarat

After Sarit's first coup d'état on 16 September 1957, he tried to hold onto power by constitutional democratic means, holding a general election on 12 December 1957. Before the coup, Sarit's supporters had founded the Sahaphum Party ("Unionist Party"). This party performed rather poorly, winning just 44 of 160 seats in the House of Representatives. Most seats were won by independents, including many former members of the Seri Manangkhasila Party of Sarit's disempowered predecessor Plaek Phibunsongkhram, who had deserted their party but were not allowed to join the Sahaphum Party.

Aiming for a more comfortable control of parliament, Sarit initiated the National Socialist Party, merging his Sahaphum Party with the group of ex-Seri Manangkhasila MPs. He made himself head of the party, his right-hand man Lieutenant General Thanom Kittikachorn and civilian official Sukich Nimmanheminda deputy leaders and Lt Gen Praphas Charusathien secretary-general of the party. The party took the motto "Nation, Religion, King, Democracy, Society" (Thai: ชาติ ศาสนา พระมหากษัตริย์ ประชาธิปไตย สังคม RTGS: Chat Sasana Phra Maha Kasat Prachathipatai Sangkhom).

A large portion of the former Sahaphum Party was dissatisfied with this move as they did not want to be associated with the group of former Seri Manangkhasila MPs. A group of 36 former Sahaphum MPs signed a letter of protest to Sarit, but pledged to support him anyway. The civilian interim prime minister Pote Sarasin resigned, probably because he did not agree with the new party either, and did not want to be a puppet of the military coup group. Thanom took office as prime minister on 1 January 1958 at the request of his mentor Sarit who stayed at the health spa of Bang Saen to cure his liver affliction. Thanom's cabinet included eleven members of the military group, six former Sahaphum members, three former Seri Manangkhasila MPs and a number of independents.

During the first months of Thanom's government, the National Socialist Party was afflicted with internal strife. Some Sahaphum Party members were still unwilling to co-operate with their rivals from the Seri Manangkhasila Party and refused to dissolve their old party, instead keeping it as an internal faction within the bigger National Socialist Party. On the other hand, the group of former independents and ex-Seri Manangkhasila members envied the Sahaphum group as the latter had received a larger share of cabinet posts. Strongman Sarit left the country to undergo surgery in the United States, while his less charismatic deputy Thanom had a hard time holding together the governing party. Twenty-six Sahaphum MPs resigned in February 1958, protesting a cut in educational expenditure, while military spending was increased. To replace them, by-elections were held in the provinces of Bangkok, Thonburi, Kalasin, Roi Et and Ubon Ratchathani. Of 26 available seats, thirteen were won by the oppositional Democrat Party and only nine by the National Socialist Party. This was a major setback to the ruling party.

The National Socialist Party—like all political parties—was dissolved on 20 October 1958 due to Sarit's second coup d'état, which he called a "revolution".

== Prime Ministers ==
Name	Portrait	Start Date	End Date	Election
Thanom Kittikachorn		1 January 1958	20 October 1958	Dec 1957 (9th)
