= Phao =

Phao may refer to:

- Pháo (born 2003), Vietnamese rapper and producer
- Phao Siyanon (1910–1960), director general of Royal Thai Police
- Sapho and Phao, British Elizibethan era comedy stage play by John Lyly
