= Fuen Ronnaphagrad Ritthakhanee =

Thai military officer

- ฟื้น รณนภากาศ ฤทธาคนี
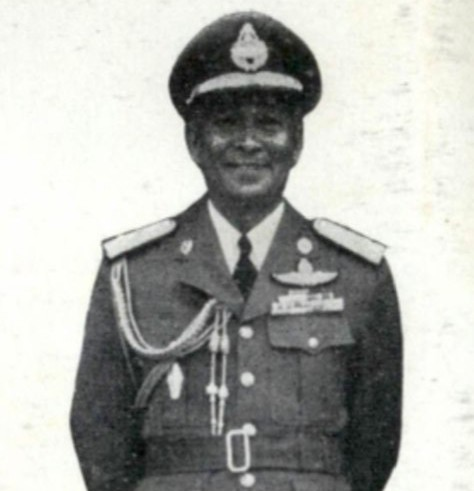
- Fuen in 1954

Deputy Prime Minister of Thailand
- In office 2 August 1955 – 16 September 1957 Serving with Prayoon Yuthasastrkosol
- Prime Minister: Plaek Phibunsongkhram
- Preceded by: Phin Choonhavan; Muni Mahasantana Wechayantrangsarit; Boonkerd Sutantanon
- Succeeded by: Wan Waithayakon; Praphas Charusathien; Sukich Nimmanheminda

Minister of Transport
- In office 6 December 1951 – 2 August 1955
- Prime Minister: Plaek Phibunsongkhram
- Preceded by: Sawat Sawatranachai Sawatdikiat
- Succeeded by: Muni Mahasantana Wechayantrangsarit

Minister of Public Health
- In office 31 March – 16 September 1957
- Prime Minister: Plaek Phibunsongkhram
- Preceded by: Prayoon Pamornmontri
- Succeeded by: Luang Chaloem Khamphirawet

4th Commander-in-chief of the Royal Thai Air Force
- In office 1949–1957
- Preceded by: Luang Thewarit Pan Luek
- Succeeded by: Chalermkiat Watanangura

Personal details
- Born: 21 February 1900 Phra Nakhon district, Phra Nakhon, Siam (now Phra Nakhon district, Bangkok, Thailand)
- Died: 8 July 1987 (aged 87)

Military service
- Allegiance: Thailand
- Branch/service: Royal Thai Air Force
- Years of service: 1914–1961
- Rank: General; Admiral; Marshal of the Air Force
- Commands: Commander-in-Chief
- Wars: World War II

Fuen Ronnaphagrad Ritthakhanee (Thai: ฟื้น รณนภากาศ ฤทธาคนี) (21 February 1900 – 8 July 1987) was a Royal Thai Air Force officer who served as the Commander of the Royal Thai Air Force from 1949 to 1957. In July 1951, Ritthakhanee became Minister of Transport and in 1955 he was elevated to the position of Deputy Prime Minister of Thailand. Relinquishing the Deputy Prime Ministership in 1957, he briefly served as Minister of Health that year.

In 1947 he was one of the group of senior officers who planned and carried out the Siamese coup d'état.

On 13 December 1949 Fuen Ronnaphagrad Ritthakhanee took over as Commander of the Royal Thai Air Force, replacing Air Marshal Luang Tevaritpunluok. He continued in the Air Force's senior post until 1957.

In 1953, Air Chief Marshal Fuen Ronnaphagrad Ritthakhanee founded the Royal Thai Air Force Academy, albeit on a temporary basis. Four years later in 1957, Fuen Ronnaphagrad Ritthakhanee who was by then a marshal of the Royal Thai Air Force and its Commander, returned to the Academy laying its foundation stone during a ceremony which marked its permanent establishment.

In the 1960s Fuen Ronnaphagrad Ritthakhanee was the chairman of the United Flour Mill Public Company Limited, Thailand's first wheat flour mill. Fuen was retired at the Supreme Command Headquarters in 1961. He died on 8 July 1987, at the age of 87.

== Decorations ==
- Thailand :
  - Knight Grand Cordon of the Most Exalted Order of the White Elephant
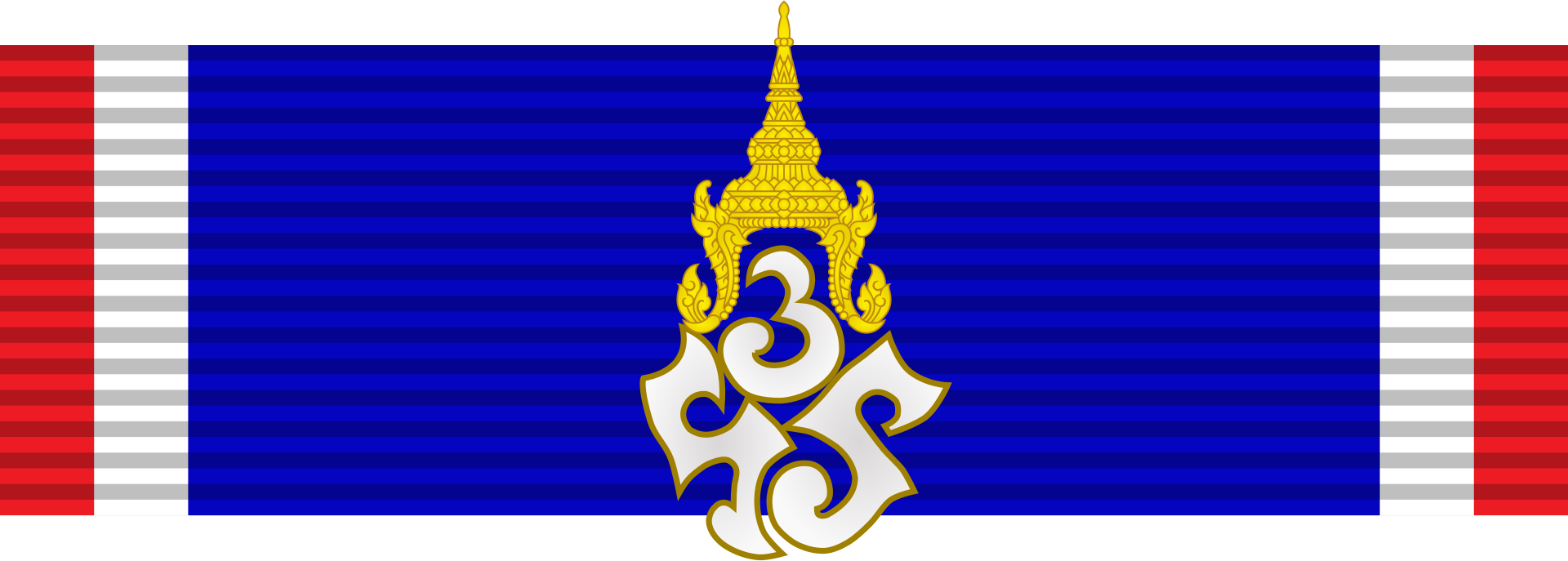
  - Knight Grand Cordon of the Most Noble Order of the Crown of Thailand
  - Knight Grand Commander of the Most Illustrious Order of Chula Chom Klao
  - Bravery Medal
  - Victory Medal - Indochina
  - Victory Medal - World War II
  - Safeguarding the Constitution Medal
  - Chakra Mala Medal
  - King Rama VIII Royal Cypher Medal, 2nd Class
  - King Rama IX Royal Cypher Medal, 2nd Class
  - King Rama VI Coronation Medal
  - King Rama VII Coronation Medal
  - King Rama IX Coronation Medal
  - Commemorative Medal on the Occasion of the 150th Years of Rattanakosin Celebration
- Cambodia :
  - Grand Cross of the Royal Order of Sahametrei
- Kingdom of Laos :
  - Order of the Reign, 1st Class
- Myanmar :
  - Commander of the Order of the Union of Burma (Civilian Member)
- USA :
  - Commander of the Legion of Merit
- UK :
  - King George VI Coronation Medal
  - Queen Elizabeth II Coronation Medal

Military offices
Preceded by Luang Tevaritpanluek	Commander of the Royal Thai Air Force; 1949 – 1957	Succeeded by Chalermkiat Vatthanangkun
