= Sahaphum Party =

Defunct political party in Thailand

Sahaphum Party พรรคสหภูมิ
- Leader: Sukich Nimmanheminda
- Founded: June 21, 1957
- Dissolved: July 21, 1958
- Merged into: National Socialist Party
- Ideology: National conservatism Militarism
- Political position: Right-wing to far-right

The Sahaphum Party (Thai: พรรคสหภูมิ, sometimes translated as "United Land" or "Unionist Party") was a political party in Thailand. It was founded on 21 June 1957 by Sukich Nimmanheminda.

Behind the scenes, the party was formed by Sanguan Chantharasakha to give parliamentary support to his half-brother Field Marshal Sarit Thanarat in his power struggle with prime minister Plaek Phibunsongkhram. Sanguan arranged a coalition of five parties, including Sahaphum and the Democrat Party that tried to topple Phibunsongkhram's government in a vote of confidence. Sahaphum Party particularly accused the government of failing to provide peace and order.

The opposition could not disempower Phibunsongkhram by parliamentary means, so Sarit Thanarat launched a successful coup d'état on 16 September 1957. King Bhumibol Adulyadej appointed Sarit "Defender of Bangkok" and he ruled the country by means of a "revolutionary council". However, Sarit promised not to stay in power permanently and appointed Pote Sarasin a civilian prime minister. Sukich Nimmanheminda and Sanguan Chantharasakha held posts in Pote's cabinet (economy minister and deputy minister of industry, respectively). Sarit also called an election for December 1957. With 44 of 160 seats, the Sahaphum Party finished as the strongest party. Nevertheless, its performance was considered disappointing, as it was far from a majority and did badly in the major cities, not winning a single seat in Bangkok or Thonburi.

Strongman Sarit quickly lost his interest in the party. Instead he founded the National Socialist Party as the new pro-government party a few days after the election. The National Socialist Party hoped to win over former members of Phibunsongkhram's Seri Manangkhasila Party who had been reelected as independents. At the same time, the Sahaphum Party had refused to accept former Seri Manangkhasila members in their ranks. Pote Sarasin resigned as prime minister, Sarit's right-hand man Thanom Kittikachorn, vice-leader of the National Socialist Party, succeeded him. His cabinet included six members from the Sahaphum Party. During the following period, the party was divided between those who wanted to join Sarit in his new party and those who wanted to continue with the Sahaphum Party. 26 Sahaphum MPs resigned from the government benches in February 1958, protesting a cut in educational expenditure, while military spending was increased.
