= Palace Rebellion =

1949 Thai coup attempt

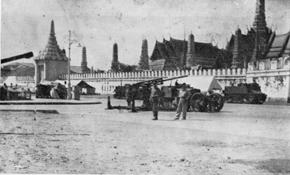
- Tanks in front of The Grand Palace
Date	February 1949
Location	Bangkok, Thailand
Result	Rebellion failed: Pridi Banomyong and his allies fail to gain power; A purge of Banomyong's allies begins

Belligerents
Phibun regime (Thailand) Royal Thai Army	(Thailand) Democracy February 26 Movement (Thailand) Royal Thai Navy (Thailand) Royal Thai Marine Corps

Commanders and leaders
(Thailand) Plaek Phibunsongkhram (Thailand) Sarit Thanarat	(Thailand) Pridi Banomyong (Thailand) Direk Jayanama

The Palace Rebellion (Thai: กบฏวังหลวง, RTGS: Kabot Wang Luang) was a 1949 coup attempt in Thailand. Its plotters aimed to overthrow the government of Field Marshal Plaek Phibunsongkhram and to restore his main civilian rival, Pridi Banomyong, to political relevance.

Pridi had disavowed the use of violence during the immediate aftermath of the 1947 coup, but the frustrations of exile eventually overcame him. Although in the People's Republic of China, he still maintained contacts with his supporters in Thailand and, with their help, he laid plans for a countercoup.

In the first week of February 1949, he secretly returned to Thailand. However, Phibunsongkhram soon learned of Pridi's intentions and quickly made a radio announcement in which he called Pridi his "friend." He went on to offer Pridi a position in the government, but Pridi decided to go ahead with his plans, and the field marshal's overtures were rebuffed.

A state of emergency was declared by the government in anticipation of the countercoup. It began on February 26, when a Royal Thai Army officer loyal to Pridi and a group of supporters seized a radio station, and Free Thai elements and Thammasat University teachers and students occupied the Grand Palace. The group at the radio station announced on the air the formation of a new government headed by Pridi's friend, Direk Jayanama.

Major-General Sarit Thanarat then moved troops in and easily managed to oust Pridi from the palace grounds. In the meanwhile, the Royal Thai Navy and the Royal Thai Marine Corps took up defensive positions around Bangkok, to protect their allies.

The rebels managed to escape in naval vessels across the Chao Phraya River, and navy units engaged the army in fierce street fighting. A ceasefire was declared that afternoon, but it would take the navy and the army a full week to negotiate a resolution to the crisis.
