= Sukich Nimmanheminda =

Thai politician (1906–1976)

- สุกิจ นิมมานเหมินท์
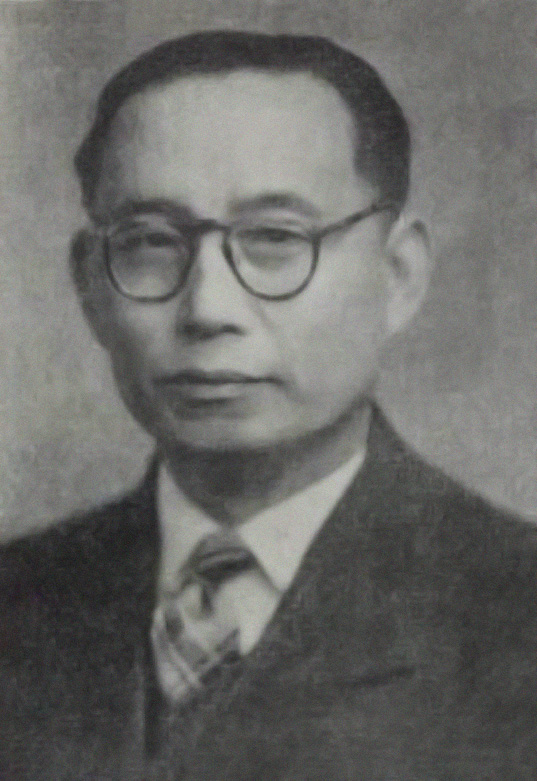

Deputy Prime Minister of Thailand
- In office 1 January 1958 – 20 October 1958
- Prime Minister: Thanom Kittikachorn
- In office 14 October 1973 – 22 May 1974
- Prime Minister: Sanya Dharmasakti

Minister of Economic Affairs
- In office 21 September 1957 – 20 October 1958
- Prime Minister: Pote Sarasin; Thanom Kittikachorn
- Preceded by: Pao Pienlert Boripanyutakit
- Succeeded by: Sunthorn Hongladarom

Minister of Industry
- In office 28 June 1949 – 12 June 1952
- Prime Minister: Plaek Phibunsongkhram
- Preceded by: Tan Snidvongs
- Succeeded by: Munee Mahasanthana Vejayantarungsarit

Personal details
- Born: 25 November 1906 Chiang Mai, Thailand
- Died: 2 February 1976 (aged 69) Bangkok, Thailand
- Education: University of London

Sukich Nimmanheminda (Thai: สุกิจ นิมมานเหมินท์, RTGS: Sukit Nimmanhemin; 25 November 1906 – 2 February 1976) was a Thai scholar, educator, politician and diplomat. He was a professor at Chulalongkorn University and served as its secretary-general. He also served multiple terms as member of parliament for Chiang Mai, and held the posts of Minister of Industry, of Economics and of Education as well as two terms as deputy Prime minister of Thailand.

== Life and career ==
Born and raised in Chiang Mai, Sukich attended Assumption College in Bangkok before he continued his education in England. He completed bachelor and master of science degrees from the University of London as well as a civil engineering diploma from Battersea Polytechnic Institute.

Upon his return to Thailand, he became a lecturer of mathematics and hydraulics at Chulalongkorn University in 1933. He was appointed secretary-general of the university in 1938 and acting dean of the Faculty of Arts in Sciences in 1940. Two years later he became both member of the executive council of Chulalongkorn University and director-general of the department of vocational education of the Thai ministry of education.

Sukich was elected member of parliament for Chiang Mai for three terms (1948–1958), and held the post of Minister of Industry in Plaek Phibunsongkhram's cabinet from 1949 to 1952. He chaired the Sahaphum Party ("United Land") founded in June 1957 to support Field Marshal Sarit Thanarat's accession to power. After Sarit's coup d'état in September 1957, Sukich served as minister of Economics and from January to October 1958 additionally as deputy prime minister in the government of Thanom Kittikachorn.

He later served as Thailand's Ambassador to India (1959–1963), also accredited in Afghanistan, Nepal and Sri Lanka. From October to December 1963 he represented Thailand as ambassador to the United States. Sukich was the first Secretary-General of the Southeast Asian Ministers of Education Organization from 1968 to 1969. Subsequently he served as minister of Education, again under Thanom, from 1969 to 1972. After the end of military dictatorship in the course of the 14 October 1973 uprising, Sukich was again deputy prime minister under Sanya Dharmasakti, serving until May 1974.

In addition to his scientific expertise, he was also knowledgeable in history and literature. He collected rare books and birds. Sukich was a Fellow of the Royal Society in two subject areas, history and physical sciences, and also served as its president from 1975 to 1976.

His book collection was given to Chiang Mai university library, and a central street in Chiang Mai is named after him.
