= Phao Siyanon =

Director general of Thailand's national police (1910–1960)

Police General Phao Siyanon เผ่า ศรียานนท์
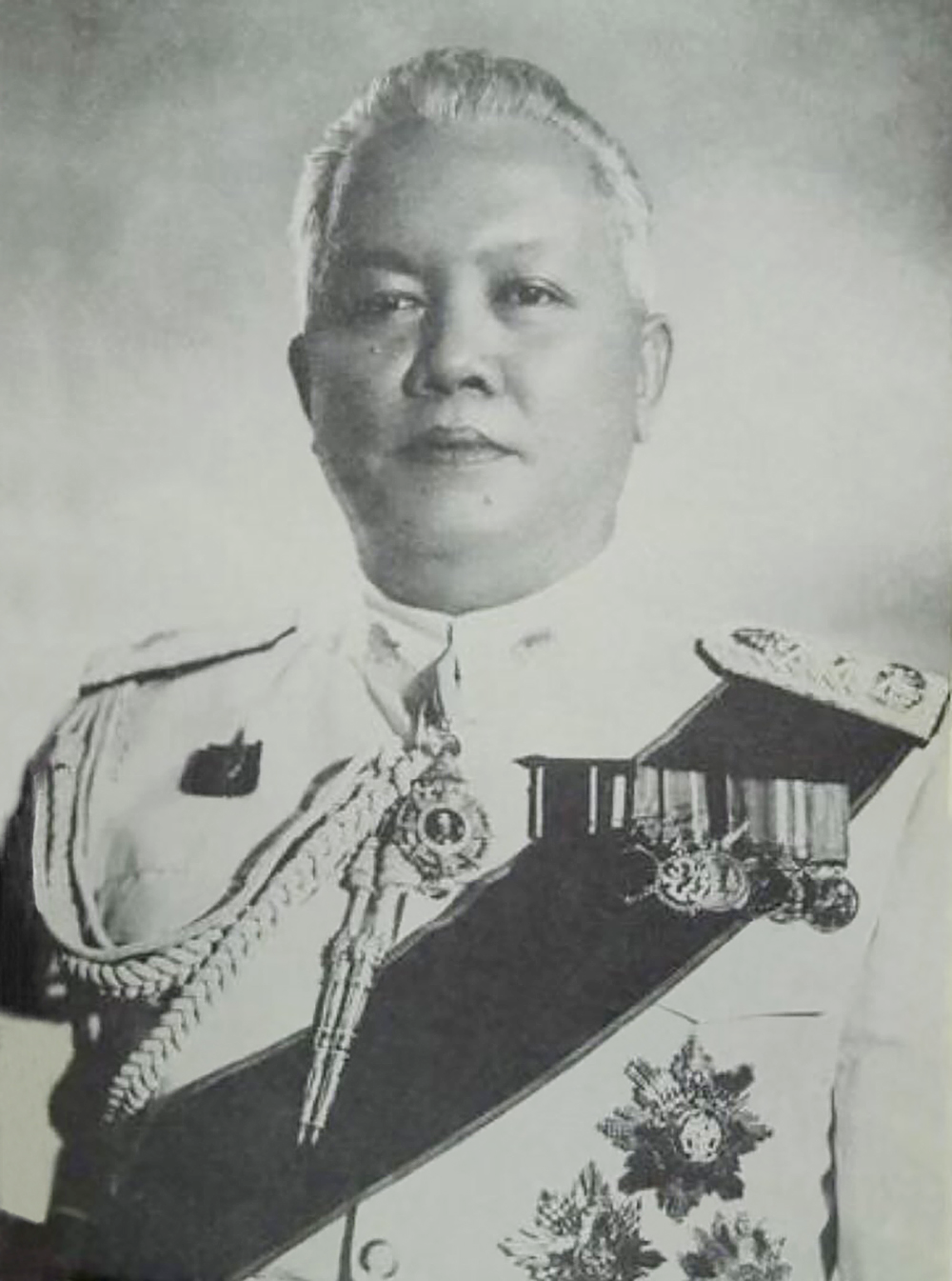

Minister of Interior
- In office 31 March 1957 – 16 September 1957
- Prime Minister: Plaek Phibunsongkhram
- Preceded by: Plaek Phibunsongkhram
- Succeeded by: Praphas Charusathien

Director-General of the Royal Thai Police
- In office 2 July 1957 – 14 September 1957
- Preceded by: Luang Charttrakankosol
- Succeeded by: Luang Charttrakankosol

Director of the Department of Administrative Intelligence
- In office 15 January 1954 – 14 September 1957
- Prime Minister: Plaek Phibunsongkhram

Personal details
- Born: Phao (Note: At that time, Thais did not have surnames.); 1 March 1910 Bangkok, Siam
- Died: 21 November 1960 (aged 50) Geneva, Switzerland
- Spouse: Udomlak (née Choonhavan)
- Children: Phonglak Prasatwinitchai

Military service
- Branch/service: Royal Thai Police
- Rank: General

General Phao Siyanon (Thai: เผ่า ศรียานนท์, also spelled Sriyanond and Sriyanon; 1 March 1910 – 21 November 1960) was a director general of the Royal Thai Police, notorious for his brutal crackdowns on political opponents. He eventually fled Thailand and died in exile.

== Rise to power ==
An ambitious army officer of Thai-Burmese ancestry, Phao married the daughter of General Phin Choonhavan. He took part in the 1947 coup d'état that ended the last of Pridi Phanomyong's attempts to create democracy in post-World War II Thailand, restoring disgraced Field Marshal Plaek Phibunsongkhram to power.

Made deputy director of the police, Phao quickly staged a show trial of the alleged "assassins" of King Ananda Mahidol (Rama VIII), in which three members of the palace staff were found guilty despite a lack of evidence and were eventually executed even though they had earlier been found innocent.

== Police terror ==
Phao was promoted to the position of director of the police in 1951, by which time he had become one of the country's all-powerful triumvirate. A client of the CIA, Phao received funds and hardware to build his personal fortune, as well as the expertise of US paramilitaries such as James William Lair to turn the police into an alternative force to oppose his military rival, Sarit Thanarat.

Phao established an intimate circle of police officers, known generally as the "knights of the diamond ring", which was notorious for its treatment of opponents of the government and the police generals, even resorting to assassination and murder. Their crimes were many:

- In March 1949, four MPs from Isan and an associate, all one-time disciples of the exiled Pridi, were arrested on charges of treason. They were shot dead by their police escort while supposedly being transferred from one jail to another.
- On 12 December 1952, Tiang Sirikhanth, MP for Sakon Nakhon, a leading Seri Thai member and an opponent of the government, was arrested with four of his associates. They were murdered (allegedly by strangulation in a police station) and their bodies burned in a forest in Kanchanaburi Province.
- A successful newspaper publisher, Ari Liwara, refused to sell out to Phao and was killed in March 1953.
- In 1954, Phon Malithong, MP for Samut Sakhon who provided evidence of corruption against Phao in Parliament, was found tied to a concrete pier in the Chao Phraya River, having first been strangled.

Phao was extremely wealthy. He demanded protection money from businessmen, rigged the gold exchange, and blackmailed corporations into giving him huge shareholdings. He also profited greatly from the opium trade. Police units transferred opium from the poppy fields of the Golden Triangle to Bangkok, ready to be exported. Trucks, planes, and boats which had been supplied to the police by the CIA, were instead used to move opium, which the police carefully guarded.

== Downfall and exile ==
Phao lost power when Phibun was overthrown by Sarit Thanarat in 1957. He fled to Switzerland, where he died at the age of 50.

== Honour ==
- 1952 - Knight Grand Cordon of the Most Exalted Order of the White Elephant
- 1951 - Knight Grand Cordon of the Most Noble Order of the Crown
- 1953 - Dame Grand Commander of the Most Illustrious Order of Chula Chom Klao
- 1941 - Victory Medal - Franco-Thai War
- 1934 - Safeguarding the Constitution Medal
- 1943 - Medal for Service Rendered in the Interior
- 1956 - Border Service Medal
- 1942 - Chakra Mala Medal
- 1950 - King Rama VIII Royal Cypher Medal, 2nd Class
- 1953 - King Rama IX Royal Cypher Medal, 2nd Class
- 1950 - King Rama IX Coronation Medal
- 1932 - 150 Years Commemoration of Bangkok Medal
- 1957 - 25th Buddhist Century Celebration Medal

=== Foreign Honour ===
- Taiwan :
  - Grand Cordon of the Order of the Sacred Tripod (1954)
- Kingdom of Laos :
  - Grand Cross of the Order of the Reign (1955)
- Cambodia :
  - Grand Cross of the Royal Order of Sahametrei (1955)
- USA :
  - Commander of the Legion of Merit (1955)

== Military rank ==
- General, Admiral, Air Chief Marshal

== Police rank ==
- Police General

== Volunteer Defense Corps of Thailand rank ==
- Volunteer Defense Corps General
