= Sarit Thanarat =

Prime Minister of Thailand from 1959 to 1963

Field Marshal Sarit Thanarat NR SR PCh MPCh MVM
- สฤษดิ์ ธนะรัชต์
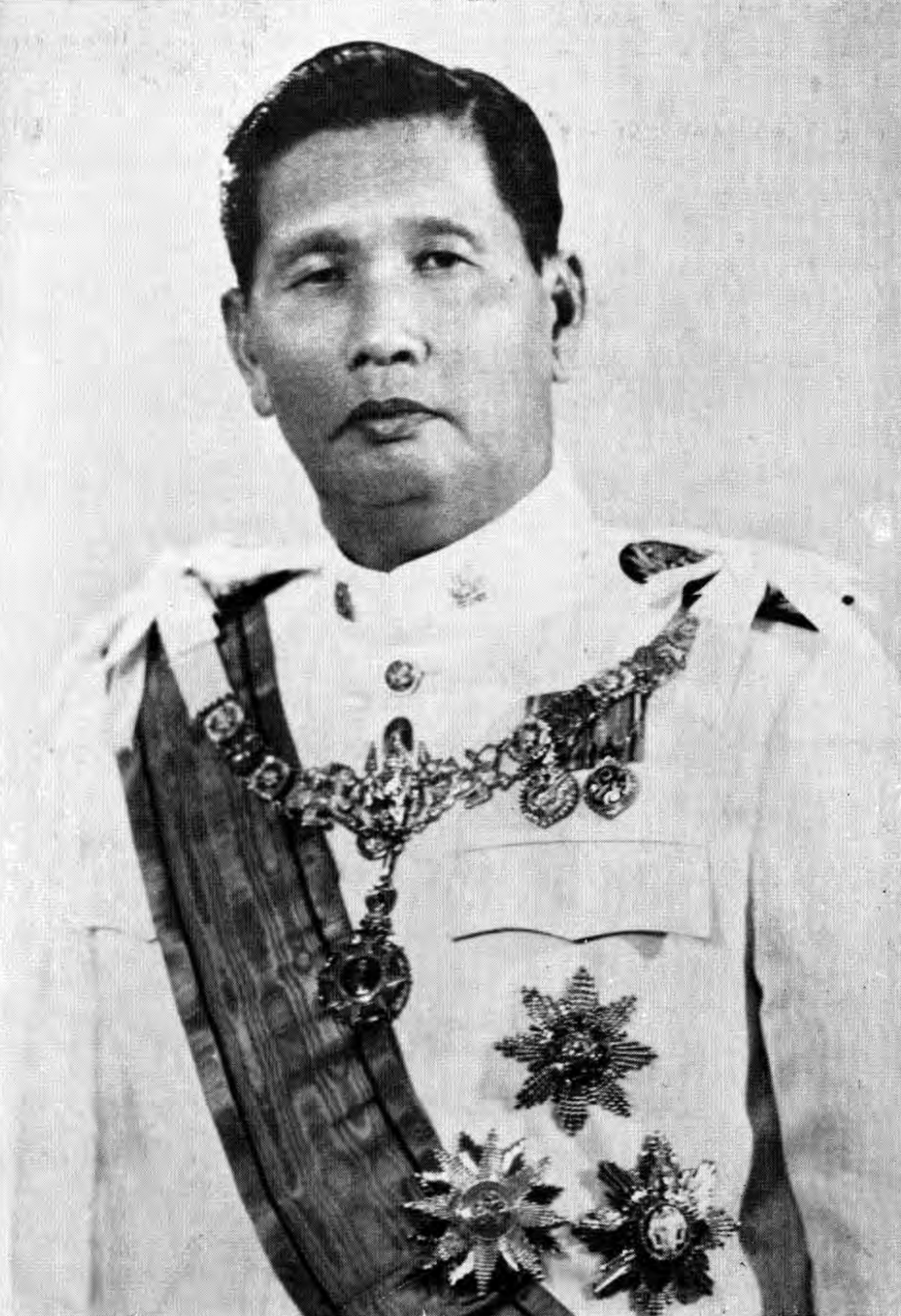
- Official portrait, 1962

11th Prime Minister of Thailand
- In office 9 February 1959 – 8 December 1963
- Monarch: Bhumibol Adulyadej
- Deputy: See list: Thanom Kittikachorn; Wan Waithayakon
- Preceded by: Himself (as Head of the Revolutionary Council)
- Succeeded by: Thanom Kittikachorn

Head of the Revolutionary Council (De facto Acting Prime Minister)
- In office 20 October 1958 – 9 February 1959
- Preceded by: Thanom Kittikachorn
- Succeeded by: Himself (as Prime Minister)
- In office 16 September 1957 – 21 September 1957
- Preceded by: Plaek Phibunsongkhram
- Succeeded by: Pote Sarasin
Governmental offices
Minister of National Development
In office 23 May 1963 – 8 December 1963
Prime Minister	Himself
Preceded by	Office established
Succeeded by	Pote Sarasin
Commissioner-General of the Royal Thai Police
In office Acting: 9 February 1959 – 8 December 1963
Preceded by	Sawai Saenyakorn
Succeeded by	Prasert Ruchirawongse
Minister of Defence
In office 31 March 1957 – 12 September 1957
Prime Minister	Plaek Phibunsongkhram
Preceded by	Plaek Phibunsongkhram
Succeeded by	Thanom Kittikachorn

2nd Supreme Commander of the Royal Thai Armed Forces
- In office 27 September 1957 – 8 December 1963
- Preceded by: Plaek Phibunsongkhram
- Succeeded by: Thanom Kittikachorn

Commander-in-Chief of the Royal Thai Army
- In office 23 June 1954 – 8 December 1963
- Preceded by: Phin Choonhavan
- Succeeded by: Thanom Kittikachorn

Personal details
- Born: Siri (Note: At that time, Thais did not have surnames.); 16 June 1908 Bangkok, Siam
- Died: 8 December 1963 (aged 55) Bangkok, Thailand
- Party: National Socialist (1957)
- Other political affiliations: Seri Manangkhasila (1955)
- Spouse: 4 (81 mistresses)
- Children: 7 (1 adopted)
- Education: Chulachomklao Royal Military Academy
- Profession: Military officer; politician
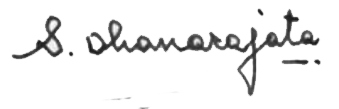
- Signature

Military service
- Allegiance: Thailand
- Branch/service: Royal Thai Army
- Years of service: 1928–1963
- Rank: Field Marshal; Admiral of the Fleet; Marshal of the Air Force
- Commands: Supreme Commander
- Battles/wars: Boworadet Rebellion; World War II; Pacific War; Palace Rebellion

Sarit Thanarat (also spelled Dhanarajata; Thai: สฤษดิ์ ธนะรัชต์ [sā.rìt tʰā.ná.rát]; 16 June 1908 – 8 December 1963) was a Thai politician and military commander. He served as commander-in-chief of the Royal Thai Army (from 1954) and as Minister of Defense during Plaek Phibunsongkhram's premiership. In 1957, he became chief of a military junta after leading a coup in which Phibun was overthrown. Sarit lasted the de facto prime minister only five days before was replaced by Pote Sarasin, but assumed power again as the head of the Revolutionary Council after 1958 coup and then as the eleventh Prime Minister of Thailand in February 1959 until his death in 1963.

Born in Phra Nakhon (now Bangkok) and raised in Mukdahan, Sarit graduated from the Chulachomklao Royal Military Academy in 1928 and began his military career as a second lieutenant in the 2nd Infantry Division. He first gained recognition during the Boworadet Rebellion, where he commanded government forces under Plaek Phibunsongkhram. During World War II, he participated in the Burma campaign, leading forces in the invasion of the Shan State under General Phin Choonhavan. Known for his strict discipline and effective leadership, Sarit quickly rose through the ranks and established himself as a prominent figure within the military after the war.

After the 1947 coup d'état, Sarit became a key political figure in Phibun's government and played an active role in suppressing the Palace Rebellion of 1949. By the 1950s, Sarit emerged as a central figure in the "Triumvirate" alongside Phao Siyanon and Phibun, as they competed for dominance in Thai politics. Sarit's influence grew significantly after the February 1957 election crisis, during which he led a coup that ousted Phibun and temporarily assumed leadership as the head of a Revolutionary Council. Although he initially restored power to civilian authorities, Sarit launched another coup in 1958, consolidating power and officially becoming Prime Minister.

As Prime Minister, Sarit established a highly centralized and authoritarian government. He suspended the constitution, dissolved parliament, and banned political parties, consolidating all power in his hands. Sarit emphasized modernization and economic development, focusing on infrastructure, agriculture, and industrialization. His government received substantial support from the United States, as it aligned itself with the anti-communist bloc during the Cold War. Domestically, Sarit promoted a strong sense of Thai nationalism and emphasized the importance of the monarchy, which became central to his administration's legitimacy.

Sarit’s legacy remains significant and controversial. He is credited with stabilizing Thailand during a period of turbulence and implementing policies that fostered economic growth and modernization. However, his regime was also characterized by authoritarianism, corruption, and political repression. Sarit’s efforts to elevate the monarchy's role in politics have had a lasting impact on Thailand’s political structure and influencing subsequent military-led government.

== Early life ==
Sarit Thanarat was born in Pak Khlong Talat, Phahurat, Phra Nakhon province (now Wang Burapha Phirom, Phra Nakhon, Bangkok), on 16 June 1908. His father, Major Luang Ruangdetanan (real name Thongdi Thanarat), was a career army officer best known for his translations into Thai of Cambodian chronicle. Thongdi hailed from Battambang and is believed to have had Khmer ancestry. His mother, Chanthip Chanthasakha, was of Lao descent and was from Mukdahan. The family lineage also included partial Chinese ancestry.

== Military career ==
Sarit Thanarat was educated at a monastery school, and entered Chulachomklao Royal Military Academy in 1919, not completing his military studies until 1928, after which he was commissioned as a second lieutenant. During World War II he served as commander of an infantry battalion and took part in the invasion and occupation of the Shan States in Burma. Unlike many of his fellow officers, Sarit was not discharged at the end of the war. Instead, he was promoted to command the 1st Infantry Regiment of the Bangkok-based Guards Division. As a colonel, he played a leading role in the 1947 military coup that overthrew the government of Prime Minister Thawal Thamrong Navaswadhi, a protege of Pridi Phanomyong, reinstalling the previously deposed Field Marshal Luang Phibunsongkram as premier. Sarit thereafter took a lasting interest in politics. He became Commander of the Royal Thai Army in 1954.

== Events leading to the coup ==
During the early-1950s, the Phibun government grew increasingly unpopular. This paved the way for the rise of Field Marshal Sarit Thanarat.

=== Elections of 26 February 1957 ===
The passing of the 1955 Political Party Bill led to the proliferation of more than twenty-five political parties. The government's Legislative Committee was revamped into the Seri Manangkhasila Party which was headed by Phibun with Sarit as deputy chief and Phao as secretary-general. Sarit did not play a significant role in the election process and generally left Phao in charge.

Although the Seri Manangkhasila Party beat the Democrat Party, the latter was seen to have won a moral victory. The Democrat Party and the press accused the government of rigging the vote and using hooligans to terrorize both candidates and voters. In a bid to repress public discontent, Phibun declared a state of emergency and Sarit was appointed as the supreme commander of military forces. However, Sarit effectively disassociated himself from the corrupt party when he commented that the 1957 elections. "were dirty, the dirtiest. Everybody cheated."

=== The Isan crisis ===
In 1957, one of Isan's worst droughts occurred. It prompted a mass exodus of people from the northeast to Bangkok, which led to social problems. The government seemed to regard this diaspora as natural and said that it could neutralize peasant discontent. The Minister of Agriculture, Field Marshal Phin Choonhavan, said that northeasterner's migration to the city and their consumption of frogs and lizards was normal and that there was nothing to worry about. At Hua Lamphong railway station in Bangkok, there were so many refugees arriving daily that students and monks had to set up emergency help stations.

On 10 August, the Deputy Minister of Agriculture, Phin, was sent by helicopter to survey the Isan region where he found nothing amiss. A second survey, also done by air, was published and again indicated that there was no crisis in Isan as all the land was in acceptable condition. In a final attempt to resolve the issue, the Phibun government allocated 53 million baht, which was to be divided equally among the 53 Isan representatives.

=== The lumber swindle ===
Before the government could recover from its inept management of the Isan crisis, its integrity was once again questioned. Thailand was loaned US$66 million for the Bhumibol Dam, a dam 154 meters high on the Ping River in Tak. The project was to take six years and had to pay for itself after completion. Many MPs were against the loan as it came immediately after the Isan famine. Out of respect for the king, the plan for the dam was not rejected. Things further escalated when Thiem Khomrit, Director-General of the Forestry Department, was forced to resign and was charged with administrative incompetence.

Enraged by the charges, Thiem went to the press to reveal the real reason for his dismissal. He stated that several powerful figures in the Thai government wanted to establish the Forestry Company of Thailand which would merge with other private companies and thereby control the lumber and teak industries. Phin, who headed this project, wanted to suspend all forestry licenses when other companies refused to collude. The plan to establish the Forestry Company of Thailand involved the Bhumibhol Dam project, as members of the Forestry Company wanted to monopolize the cutting of timber in the areas to be flooded by the dam. Thiem further revealed that the Seri Manangkhasila Party had submitted an early application for a license to cut down trees in the area. According to Thiem, his refusal to approve the government's application was the cause of his dismissal.

== The coup ==
On 13 September 1957, Sarit handed Phibun the army's ultimatum. The ultimatum, signed by 58 army officers, called for the resignation of the government. The public supported Sarit's ultimatum.

On 16 September, a public gathering assembled to protest Phibun and his government. The crowd, which quickly grew in numbers, marched to Sarit's residence to show support for the army's demands. As Sarit was not at home, the crowd broke into the government compound where they made speeches condemning the government. The protesters later returned to Sarit's home where he was waiting to address them. In his speech, Sarit said, "In the name of the army and deputies of the second category, I have conducted my activities based on popular will, and the interests of the people — your coming here gives me moral support to continue."

The following morning, Sarit and his army staged a coup d'etat. In less than an hour, the army successfully captured strategic points with no resistance. To identify themselves, Sarit's forces wore white arm bands as a sign of purity. Following these developments, Phibun immediately fled the country and Phao was deported to Europe. Thus began Sarit's rule.

== Influences on Sarit's rule ==
According to many Western academics, the Cold War largely propped up Sarit's regime. In his book, Daniel Fineman states that Phibun, and later Sarit, aligned their foreign policies with US anti-communist foreign policy, so as to receive financial and military aid. Sarit's strict stance against communism further reinforced the US belief that only the Thai military could contain the communist threat.

In contrast, Likhit Dhiravegin stresses that the notion of phokho (patriarchal rule) from the Sukhothai Kingdom and devaraja (god–king) and sakdina (dignity marks) from the Ayutthaya Kingdom are essential in understanding modern Thai politics. Likhit's analysis shows how Sarit combined paternalistic rule from the Sukothai (phokhun) with Ayuthaya's despotic power to create his personal political style. According to Thak, Luang Wichit Wathakan was essential in moulding the leadership principles of Phibun and Sarit. From him, Sarit was introduced to the idea of pattiwat (revolution) and the guiding leadership principle of phokhun.

== Sarit's tenure ==
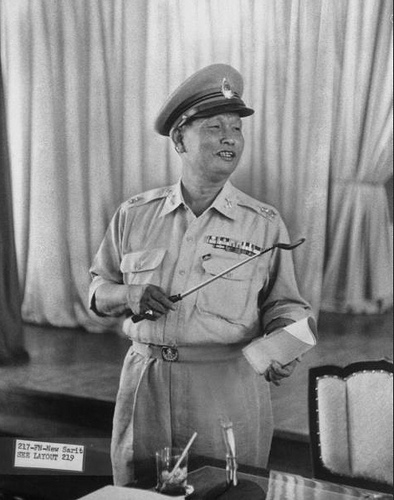
Sarit Thanarat before 1963

=== Paternalism ===
Within days of the coup, electricity rates were lowered and families living in the water-scarce Bangkok-Thonburi area were given 300 large buckets of water free every month. To help the needy, the Revolutionary Council ordered the municipal government to abolish certain taxes, charges for official service, and license fees. Hospitals were ordered to give out free medicine and healthcare to the poor, while student nurses and social workers were instructed to make house calls to help with child delivery and health problems.

To lower food prices, Sarit ordered the opening of new markets modeled after the Sunday flea markets at Sanam Luang. Merchants could sell their goods directly to the public instead of going through middlemen, thus reducing food prices. Participating merchants only had to pay nominal fee. Sarit also lowered the price of iced black coffee, a popular beverage among locals, from 70 satang per glass to 50 satang per glass. (To evade this, merchants served the coffee in smaller glasses, added less coffee, or more ice into the beverage. Thais were then forced to order the "special" coffee which was the original coffee at the original price).

The Association of Rice Merchants agreed to lower their rice prices in the stores they controlled. In a bid to show that everyone was participating in the revolution, the navy was called on by Sarit to provide cheap coconuts to be sold to the public.

Even though many of these programs did not last long or were not implemented, their announcements helped to create an atmosphere of enthusiasm for the new government.

His government advocated for economic liberalization in the early 1960s.

=== Dealing with deviants ===
Soon after the coup, Sarit ordered the arrest and reformation of hooligans (anthaphan). According to the Revolutionary Council's Proclamation No. 21, anthaphan were the bane of the society and to maintain common people's happiness, there was a need to get rid of them. Those with long hair, flashy clothing, and tight pants, in fashion at the time, were also targeted. Weekly dances at Lumpini Garden were banned, and rock and roll music was prohibited from government parties. Upon the release of the victims, Sarit said that he did not hate them, but his actions were necessary for the "family".

Prostitution was also considered as a menace to society. Sarit ordered all arrested prostitutes be reformed by sending them to institutions which would equip them with new skills. He also passed the Law Against Prostitution, B.E. 2503.

=== Getting rid of opium ===
Sarit was determined to end the consumption and sale of opium in Thailand for several reasons. First, he wanted to illustrate to the people that he did not intend to gain from the opium trade, unlike his predecessor Phao. Second, he wanted to please the Western powers who believed that the drug was used by communists to undermine the morals and economy of democratic countries. Last, he saw the eradication of opium as part of his mission to uplift the country morally. Consequently, 43,445 opium pipes were destroyed, and the Committee to Combat Addictive Drugs, headed by Sarit, was created.

=== Imposing order ===
General Sarit declared that Thailand would abide by the UN's Universal Declaration on Human Rights of 1948, to which Thailand was a signatory, except in cases when it did not.

Article 17 of the Interim Constitution of Thailand, B.E. 2502 or " M17" was the legal basis for Sarit to order executions. Using M17, parliament was abolished, newspapers were strictly censored, political parties were prohibited, and people who were suspected of colluding with communists were imprisoned. From 1958 to 1963, eleven people were executed under M17. Five were given death penalty for arson, one for heroin production, one for spearheading a messianic uprising, and four on charges of communism, including the activist and former MP Khrong Chandawong. The Revolutionary Council Proclamation No. 12, dated 22 October 1958, gave investigating authorities the power to detain suspects as long as needed. Many of those persecuted were not communists, but rather writers or intellectuals who opposed Sarit's rule. Under the proclamation, an estimated 1,000 suspects were imprisoned.

According to Frank Darling, Sarit's regime was authoritarian and retreated from what little democracy was gained during the 1932 revolution. Thak suggests that Sarit's strict rule can be understood as the modern phokhun style of leadership, where the benevolent leader intervenes to help his people.

== The monarchy ==
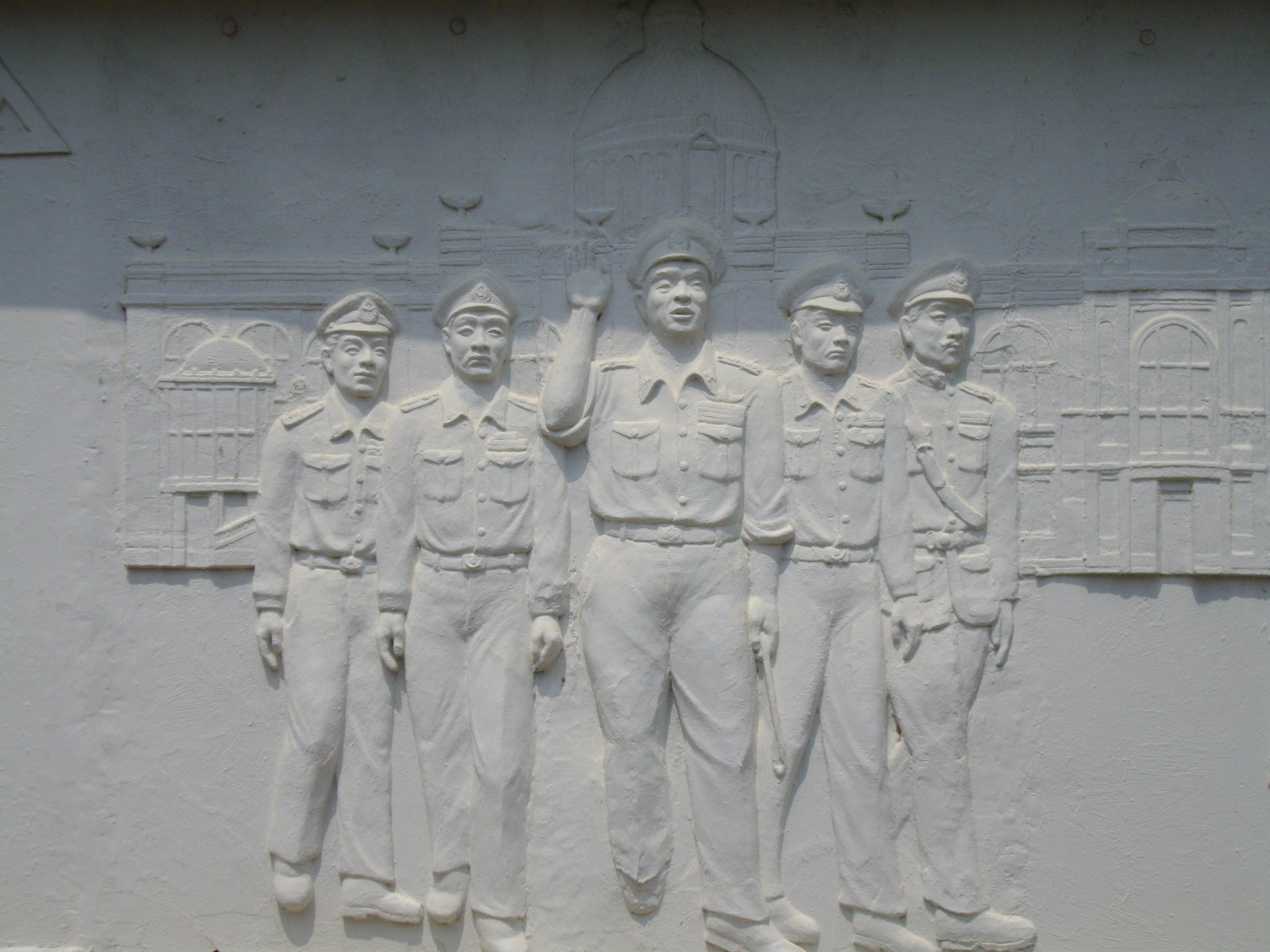
Relief of Sarit Thanarat's life in Khon Kaen, depicts his coup d'état in 1957

Under Sarit's rule, the monarchy was revived and brought back to centre stage. Sarit arranged for King Bhumibhol Adulyadej to attend public ceremonies, visit provinces, patronize development projects, and present diplomas to Thailand's university graduates, helping to bring the monarchy closer to the people and raising the stature of the king to that of reverence. The practice of prostration, with the head touching the ground before royal audiences, banned decades earlier by King Chulalongkorn, was reinstated. On 5 December 1982, the Army's 21st infantry regiment was transferred to the palace and Queen Sirikit was appointed its colonel-in-chief.

The Sarit government revived traditional festivals and ceremonies which were abandoned after the 1932 revolution. An example was the revival of the First Ploughing ceremony (Raek Nakhwan) which dates back to the Sukothai Kingdom.

According to Thak, the Sarit regime had two main reasons for reinvigorating the monarchy. First, the monarchy legitimized not only his regime, but its policies as well. Sarit's plan to stage a coup against Phibun was supported by the monarchy as evidenced by a letter written by the king. The letter expressed the king's confidence in Sarit and urged Sarit to do his duty to the government. Second, the monarch contributed to regime's paternalistic programs. In this instance, the throne acted as a charity, collecting funds from private donors, channeling them into public programs that enhanced both the regime's and the monarchy's reputation.

After 1966, the number of public appearances by the king increased and as the years passed, more visits were made. The king's newly powerful position was evidenced by the number of scheduled audiences with the prime minister and other cabinet ministers. The monarchy also moved closer to the military as illustrated by the number of military affairs attended by the king in 1963.

== Sarit's death and aftermath ==
Sarit died unexpectedly in late 1963 from liver failure, just as his economic measures were proving successful. There was a peaceful transfer of power to Sarit's deputy generals: Thanom Kittikachorn, who became prime minister, and Praphas Charusathien, who became deputy prime minister. Thanom and Praphas maintained Sarit's authoritarian style of government, his anti-communism, and his pro-US policies.

The strength of Sarit's relationship with King Bhumibol was evident when the king ordered 21 days of official mourning in the palace after his death, with Sarit's body lying in state under royal patronage for 100 days and the king and queen attending his cremation on 17 March 1964.

== Posthumous revelations ==
After Sarit's death, his reputation took a blow when an inheritance battle between his son, Major Setha Thanarat, and his last wife, Thanpuying Vichitra Thanarat, revealed the massive extent of Sarit's wealth, which totaled over US$100 million. Besides sitting on the boards of 22 companies, he was discovered to have owned a trust company, a brewery, 51 cars, and 30 plots of land, most of which he gave to his dozens of mistresses. Thai language newspapers published the names of 100 women who claimed to have shared his bed, shocking the public when his corruption was uncovered.

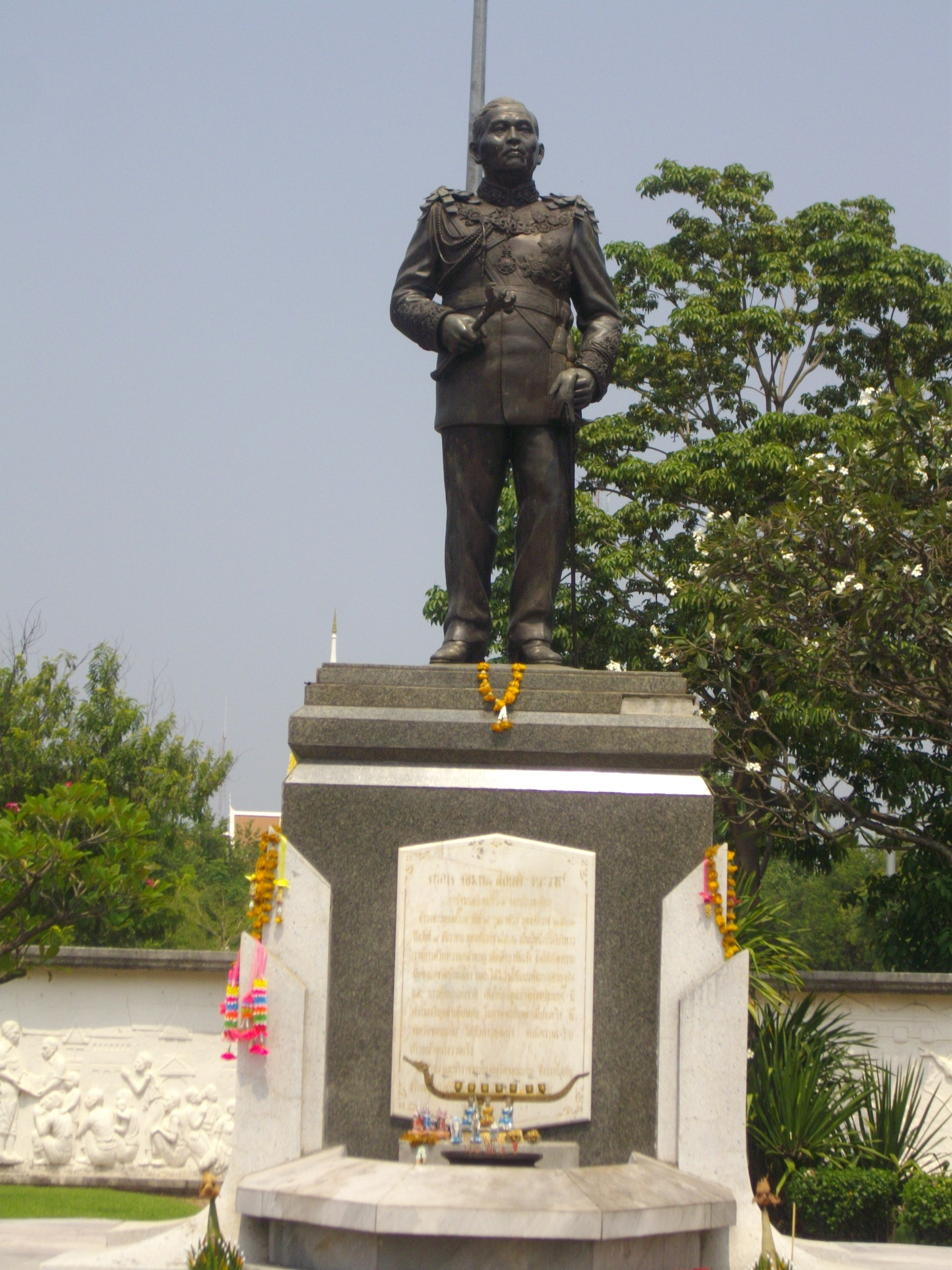
Sarit Dhanarajata Monument in Khon Kaen

== Royal decorations ==
As usual with senior Thai military officers and politicians, Sarit received many royal decorations in the Honours System. These include:

- Knight of The Ancient and Auspicious Order of the Nine Gems – 1959
- Ribbon for the 1st Class of the Most Illustriou Order of Chula Chom Klao – 1959
- Knight Grand Commander of the Honourable Order of Rama – 1962
- Knight Grand Cordon (Special Class) of the Most Exalted Order of the White Elephant – 1952
- Knight Grand Cordon (Special Class) of The Most Noble Order of the Crown of Thailand – 1951
- Victory Medal – World War II – 1962
- Safeguarding the Constitution Medal – 1934 – for helping put down the Boworadet Rebellion
- Border Service Medal – 1962
- Chakra Mala Medal – 1942
- Boy Scout Citation Medal – 1962
- King Rama VIII Royal Cypher Medal, 2nd Class – 1950
- King Rama IX Royal Cypher Medal, 1st Class – 1958
- King Rama VI Coronation Medal
- King Rama VII Coronation Medal
- King Rama IX Coronation Medal
- 150 Years Commemoration of Bangkok Medal
- 25th Buddhist Century Celebration Medal
- Red Cross Medal of Appreciation, 1st Class

=== Foreign Honours ===
- United States :
  - Commander of the Legion of Merit - 18 August 1954
- Kingdom of Laos :
  - Grand Cross of the Order of the Million Elephants and the White Parasol - 1956
  - Order of the Reign, 1st Class - 1954
- Cambodia :
  - Grand Cross of the Royal Order of Sahametrei - 1955
- Italy :
  - Knight Grand Cross of the Order of Merit of the Italian Republic - 1955
- Portugal :
  - Grand Cross of the Military Order of Aviz (G.C.A.) - 1960
- Germany :
  - Grand Cross 1st Class of the Order of Merit of the Federal Republic of Germany - 1960
- Spain :
  - Grand Cross with White Decoration of the Order of Military Merit - 1961
- Brazil :
  - Grand Cross of the Order of the Southern Cross - 1961
- Netherlands :
  - Knight Grand Cross of the Order of the Netherlands Lion - 1961
- Luxembourg :
  - Grand Cross of the Order of the Oak Crown - 1961
- Belgium :
  - Grand Cordon of the Order of Leopold - 1961
- Argentina :
  - Grand Cross of the Order of the Liberator General San Martín - 1962
- Philippines :
  - Grand Collar of the Order of Sikatuna (G.C.S.) - 1963
- Japan :
  - Grand Cordon of the Order of the Rising Sun with Paulownia Flowers - 1963
- Taiwan :
  - Special Grand Cordon of the Order of the Brilliant Star - 1963
- Kingdom of Greece :
  - Knight Grand Cross of the Royal Order of George I - 1963
- Denmark :
  - Grand Cross of the Order of the Dannebrog
- Burma :
  - Grand Commander of the Order of the Union of Burma (Civilian member)
- South Korea :
  - Taegeuk Medal with Gold Star of the Order of Military Merit
- Holy See :
  - Knight Grand Cross of the Order of Pope Pius IX

== See also ==
- List of prime ministers of Thailand
- Khao Yai National Park
- Khon Kaen University

== Notes ==
Political offices
Preceded by Plaek Phibunsongkhram	Minister of Defence; 1957	Succeeded by Thanom Kittikachorn
Preceded by Thanom Kittikachorn	Prime Minister of Thailand; 1959–1963	Succeeded by Thanom Kittikachorn
First	Minister of National Development; 1963; Served alongside: Phra Prakatsahakorn	Succeeded by Pote Sarasin
Military offices
Preceded by Phin Choonhavan	Commander-in-Chief of the Royal Thai Army; 1954–1963	Succeeded by Thanom Kittikachorn
Vacant Title last held by Plaek Phibunsongkhram	Supreme Commander of the Royal Thai Armed Forces; 1957–1963	Succeeded by Thanom Kittikachorn
Police appointments
Preceded by Sawai Sawaiseanyakorn	Commissioner-General of the Royal Thai Police; 1959–1963	Succeeded by Prasert Rujirawong
Academic offices
Preceded by Thanom Kittikachorn	President of the Silpakorn University Committee; 1960–1963	Succeeded by Thanom Kittikachorn
