= Bhandit Rittakol =

- บัณฑิต ฤทธิ์ถกล
- Born: Bhandit Leetrakul; 21 March 1951; Sena, Ayutthaya, Thailand
- Died: 1 October 2009 (aged 58); Vajira Hospital, Bangkok, Thailand
- Occupations: Film director; producer; screenwriter
- Years active: 1984–2010
- Spouse: Nanthana Rittakol

Bhandit Rittakol (Thai: บัณฑิต ฤทธิ์ถกล, b. 21 March 1951 in Ayutthaya Province, Thailand d. 1 October 2009 in Bangkok) was a Thai film director, producer and screenwriter. His films include the controversial biographical film of Thai communist revolutionary Seksan Prasertkul, The Moonhunter; the jungle thriller Tigress of King River and The Seed (Duay Klao or Thai: ด้วยเกล้า), a semi-documentary story of Isan farmers hit by drought who are saved by cloud seeding operations sponsored by King Bhumibol Adulyadej, as well as the Boonchu teen comedy series of the 1980s and 1990s.

== Biography ==
=== Early career ===
After graduating from Assumption University in 1971, Bhandit became a journalist for The Nation, an English-language daily newspaper that had just been started by some Thai journalists. Among the stories he covered was the 14 October 1973 uprising (see History of Thailand (1932-1973)).

In 1975, he became a film critic and screenwriter, which eventually led to a career as a director. He made his first film Khad Cheak, in 1984.

In 1987 he made Duay Klao (The Seed), a drama about farmers in the north of Thailand hit by drought. The movie starred folksinger Jarun Manopetch and won the best picture and best actor honors at the Thailand National Film Awards. The Seed was remastered and re-released in 2006 to commemorate the 60th anniversary of the accession of King Bhumibol Adulyadej. This is the only Thai film made to date to specifically address King Bhumibol's cloud seeding program. As well other Thai royal projects are depicted in the film. The re-released film also featured a new score of compositions by the king.

Other films by Bhandit include Classmates, which won best picture, best director and best screenplay in 1990; I Miss You, winner of best picture, best director and best screenplay in 1993, and Once Upon a Time, the hit comedy film series Boonchoo. His drama, Kalla khrung nueng ... muea chao nee (Once Upon a Time ... This Morning), won awards for best director and best screenplay and was submitted as Thailand's Best Foreign Language Film for the 68th Academy Awards in 1995.

=== The Moonhunter ===
Bhandit became controversial in 2001 with the release of The Moonhunter (14 tula, songkram prachachon or 14 October: War of the People), a biographical film about 1970s Thammasat University student activist and communist rebel Seksan Prasertkul, who co-wrote the screenplay. The English title refers to an episode when Seksan was fighting in the jungles of Thailand and, one night, startled by the rise of the moon, he fired his rifle at it.

The Censorship Board banned the film's trailer, which included stock footage from 14 October 1973 student uprising, with soldiers and policemen beating up unarmed pro-democracy demonstrators. Bhandit then vowed to not release the film if the board made any cuts, but the board responded that Bhandit was simply using the censorship review process as a means of generating publicity for his film. As it turned out, the film was released without any cuts, a sign, Bhandit said, that Thai society was maturing.

The film was submitted by Thailand for the Academy Award for Best Foreign Language Film.

Subsequent films, the CGI-heavy The Tigress of King River, the science fiction film, Ukkabat (Meteor) and the swashbuckling period film, The Magnificent Five generated neither controversy nor critical acclaim.

=== Later career ===
Despite health problems including diabetes and a heart attack, Bhandit continued to work.

"What else I can do? Run a noodle shop?" the director was quoted as saying by The Nation in 2006. "I have to work. I don't have much time because a director of my age is going to be out of fashion soon."

In 2008, he made a critical and commercial comeback with Boonchu 9, which revived his hit teen comedy series highlighting the clash of rural and urban cultures. In 2009, he released the teen romance A-Nueng Kidthueng Pen Yang Ying, reviving his earlier Miss You series.

He also directed Maha Nakorn, one of nine shorts by different directors in the Sawasdee Bangkok anthology. It premiered as the closing film on 30 September 2009 at the 2009 Bangkok International Film Festival, just one day before his death. He was also at work on Boonchu 10, which studio Five Star Production planned to go ahead and complete.

== Partial filmography ==
- Khad Cheak (1984)
- Duay Klao (The Seed) (1987)
- Boonchoo (1988)
- Hong 2 Run 44 (Classmates) (1990)
- Anueng Khitthueng Pho Sangkhep (I Miss You) (1992)
- Kalla khrung nueng... muea chao nee (Once Upon a Time... This Morning) (1994)
- Satang (2000)
- 14 tula, songkram prachachon (The Moonhunter) (2001)
- Sarb suer tii lum nam kasat (Tigress of King River) (2002)
- Chue chop chuan ha reung (2003)
- Ukkabat (The Meteor) (2004)
- Phra-dek-seua-kai-wawk (The Magnificent Five) (2006)
- My First Report (Short Films Project in Commemoration of the Celebration on the Auspicious Occasion of His Majesty the King's 80th Birthday Anniversary, 2007)
- Charming Bangkok (section – Maha Nakhon – Short films project produced and distributed by Thai PBS and Bangkok Metropolitan Administration, 2010)

== See also ==
- Category:Films directed by Bhandit Rittakol
