= Boonchu (film series) =

Thai comedy film series

Boonchu (Thai: บุญชู) was a Thai comedy film franchise made eight times, in ten parts, from 1988 to 2010. It was produced by Five Star Production. The first seven parts were directed and written by Bhandit Rittakol, and starred Santisuk Promsiri and Chintara Sukapatana.

The movie series that followed became the most popular and highes-grossing Thai movie with every installment. After this film, Bhandit became the contemporary filmmaker with the highest-grossing Thai films between 1988 and 1995. He won the Phra Saraswati Royal Award (or Golden Doll) in the category of popular films for three consecutive years.

Boonchu installment Boonchu Phu Narak was recommended as one of the 100 Thai movies that Thai people should see. It appeared on the Time National Film Heritage List.
