= Absolutely Animals =

- Presented by: Dani Behr
- Country of origin: United Kingdom
- Original language: English
- No. of series: 4
- No. of episodes: 34

Production
- Producer: Mike Kavanagh
- Running time: 22-26 minutes
- Production company: Hawkshead Productions

Original release
- Network: Animal Planet; Channel 4
- Release: 20 September 1995 – 11 August 1998

Absolutely Animals is a television program that aired on Animal Planet and Channel 4 between 20 September 1995 and 11 August 1998. The show was presented by Dani Behr and was designed to cover current animal news stories for the time.

== Content ==
The show's debut season in 1995 featured four presenters: Dani Behr, Laurie Pike, Helen Richards, and Edward Whitley. In the show's 1996 season, it featured two presenters, Wendy Turner and Mark Evans. In every episode that season, Turner stopped by a Halewood, Liverpool, animal shelter run by RSPCA, while Evans met with individuals who have difficult pets. At the animal shelter, Turner encounters a cat violent cat who previously had been abused as well as a person with asthma whose affliction worsens owing to her cats.

In a 1998 episode, Turner visited the United States to examine the conditions faced by rodeo animals. In several 1998 episodes, Turner conducted an examination into the international market for contraband tiger goods. She visited the Sriracha Tiger Zoo in Thailand.

== Reception ==
The Guardian said in 1996 that through its interweaving of bleak updates from a shelter run by the RSPCA with dispatches from far-flung places, the show is "not as high up the cute-ometer as Animal Hospital, but certainly beats bird-watching with Bill Oddie". The newspaper stated in 1998 that Absolutely Animals "moves seamlessly from the hard edged to the cute and furry".
