= Boonchu Phu Narak =

1988 Thai film

- Film poster
- Directed by: Bhandit Rittakol
- Written by: Bhandit Rittakol
- Produced by: Charoen Iamphungporn
- Starring: Santisuk Promsiri; Chintara Sukapatana; Arun Pawilai; Krit Sukramongkol; Wachara Pan-Iom; Nirut Sirijanya; Kiat Kitjaroen; Rome Isara; Somkiat Kunanitipong; Yanee Jongwisut; Kanyalak Bamrungrak; Is Issara
- Cinematography: Phiphat Phayakkha
- Edited by: Poonsak Uthaiphan
- Music by: Dumrong Thampitak; Jaran Manophet
- Production company: Five Star Production
- Distributed by: Five Star Production
- Release date: 11 June 1988
- Running time: 115 minutes
- Country: Thailand
- Language: Thai
- Box office: 10 million baht

Boonchu Phu Narak (Thai: บุญชูผู้น่ารัก) is a 1988 Thai comedy film directed by Bhandit Rittakol and released by Five Star Production. It tells the story of Boonchu (Santisuk Promsiri), a naïve country boy from Suphan Buri who goes to Bangkok for university, and falls in love with Mo (Chintara Sukapatana), and, with his new companions, has to rescue her when she is kidnapped. The film became a phenomenal hit, earning over 10 million baht at the box office and generating a long stream of sequels over the following decade. It launched the careers of Santisuk and Chintara as an on-screen couple, and they would go on to star together in several further films. Boonchu Phu Narak was listed in the National Film Heritage Registry by the Thai Film Archive in its third listing in 2013.

== Cast ==
- Santisuk Promsiri as Boonchu
- Chintara Sukapatana as Molee
- Nirut Sirijanya as Boonchuay
- Arun Pawilai as Nara
- Wachara Pon-Iom as Vaiyakorn
- Yanne Jongwisut as Manee
- Kiat Kitcharoen as Yoi
- Krit Sukramongkol as Khammoon
- Juree Ohsiri as Boonlom
- Rome Isara as Inert
