= Tigress of King River =

- Film poster
- Thai: สาบเสือที่ลำน้ำกษัตริย์
- Directed by: Bhandit Rittakol
- Written by: Bhandit Rittakol
- Produced by: Somsak Techaratanaprasert
- Starring: Panu Suwanno; Prangthong Changdham; Jo Scott Shepherd; Sunisa Brown
- Cinematography: Wanchai Leng-Ew
- Edited by: Sunij Asavinikul
- Music by: In and On
- Production company: Sahamongkol Film International
- Distributed by: Sahamongkol Film International
- Release date: 30 August 2002
- Running time: 138 minutes
- Country: Thailand
- Languages: Thai; English; Karenic; Burmese

Tigress of King River (Thai: สาบเสือที่ลำน้ำกษัตริย์ or Sab Suea Thi Lam Nam Kasat) is a 2002 Thai adventure thriller film directed and written by Bhandit Rittakol.

== Summary ==
The story takes place the in 19th year of the King Rama V's reign. When the British captain Peter Bain is busted for trying to sell defective firearms to influential Chinese non-timber forest product trader named Yang. Forced to hunt wild game with these firearms along with Yang's men, Bain links up with ex-monk Wan and Karen-American female guide and hunter Julia, who he meets on the way to the jungle. The group sets off to hunt a long-tusked elephant, said to be protected by a demon tigress that can transform itself into a woman. The tigress is supposedly possessed by the revengeful spirit of Nian, a young woman who was tortured and killed in the King River Battle near the Three Pagoda Pass almost a century earlier.

As Wan learns more about the tigress myth, he tries to release Nian's spirit, but Yang's men want to destroy Nian and get the elephant. With greed, resentment, and karma from past lives encircling the group, violence is surely around the corner.

== Cast ==
- Panu Suwanno as Wan
- Prangthong Changdham as Nian
- Jo Scott Shepherd as Peter Bain
- Sunisa Brown as Julia
- Sompong Chullasapya as Yang

== Production and reception ==
Tigress of King River is the final work of veteran filmmaker Bhandit Rittakol with a prolific career in the 1980s and 1990s. This is Rittakol's first adventure thriller and special effects film (he had previously mostly worked in the comedy genre). Due to the change in genre, the response was not good. It is considered a lesser-known work of Rittakol.

Although the story takes place at the King River, it was filmed on the Songalia River.

The tigers that appear in the film were trained by Sriracha Tiger Zoo under The Thai Wild Animal Reservation and Protection Act, B.E. 2535 (1992).

The film was criticized "as a state-race blur and the complexity of religion".

== Nominations ==
The film was nominated for four awards at the 11th Bangkok Critics Assembly Awards, including Best Director (Bhandit Rittakol), Best Actor (Panu Suwanno), Best Screenplay (Bhandit Rittakol) and Best Art Direction (Wanchai Leng-Ew). It was also nominated for the 12th Suphannahong National Film Awards for Best Actor (Panu Suwanno). It did not win in any of these categories.

== Trivia ==
- The King River is a real location. Locally known as "Lam Nam Kasat" (ลำน้ำกษัตริย์), it is also translated as "King River". There is another river that is a pair, namely "Lam Nam Suriya" (ลำน้ำสุริยะ, "Solar River"). Both of them do not appear on any map at all. Both watercourses flow upstream to a confluence with the Salween River on the Myanmar side. Currently, they originated in Thung Yai Naresuan Wildlife Sanctuary, Kanchanaburi Province.
- The King River Battle in the story is part of the Nine Armies War (1785–86) that took place during King Rama I's reign in the early Rattanakosin period. It is regarded as the last great war between Siam (Thailand) and Burma (Myanmar).
- The demon tigress that appears in the film. In Thai, it is called "Suea Saming" (เสือสมิง), similar to a werecat or a skin-walker in Western beliefs. Suea Saming is the belief of a race of forest dwelling people, such as Karen. The person who could turn into a tiger (or tigress) was because of the power of black magic. Suea Saming is believed to be the spirit of the jungle and the mineral lick protector. It often lures its prey (most of them are hunters) by transforming into their wife or lover, by tricking them down from the raised platform hung on a tree waiting for game at night to kill. The story of Suea Saming is mentioned in Thai history. It was written in the memoir of King Rama V's visit to the people when he traveled to the forest of Chanthaburi in 1876.
- Sab Suae Thi Lam Nam Kasat, the film's Thai title, literally translates as "The Stench of Tiger at King River" or "The Curse of Tiger at King River". It can also be translated as "Siam weed at King River".

== See also ==
- Thai ghosts
