= Suan Buak Hat Park =

Park in Phra Sing, Thailand

Nong Buak Hat Park
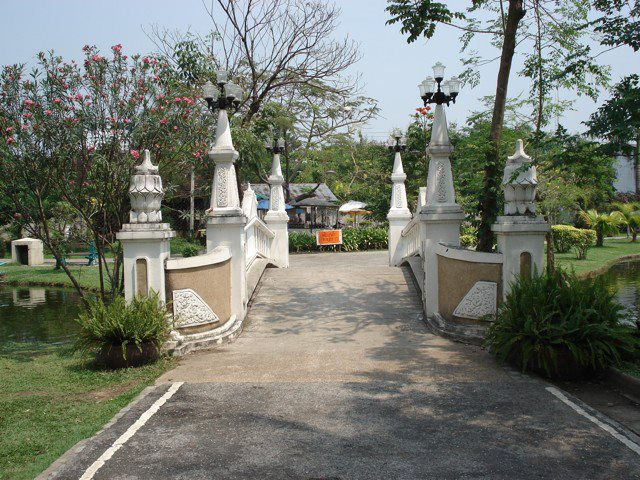
- Interactive map of Nong Buak Hat Park
- Type: Urban park
- Location: Mueang Chiang Mai district, Chiang Mai
- Coordinates: 18.7821°N 98.9793°E
- Area: 4.74 acres (1.92 ha)
- Operated by: Chiang Mai Municipality

Nong Buak Hat Park (Thai: สวนสาธารณะหนองบวกหาด), commonly called Suan Buak Hat Park (Thai: สวนบวกหาด), is a 12 rai (1.92-hectare (4.7-acre) public park located in the southwest corner of Chiang Mai’s old city. It is open every day from 05.00 - 21.00.

It is a place for local people and tourists to visit and is a location for many of Chiang Mai’s festivals such as the Flower Festival.

In 2022 a statue was erected at the park for musician Jaran Manophet.

== Activity ==
There are many activities that can be done in the park such as:

- Jogging: The park's perimeter is 440m [0.3 miles], a convenient distance for running practice.
- Weightlifting: All along the perimeter path are sturdy devices for exercise, and in the northeast corner is a modern, covered area with weights, benches and a sand floor.
- Sepak Takraw: (Thai: เซปักตะกร้อ) The area set aside for this ancient sport "Sepak Takraw" or simply "takraw" is always busy with players of every age and nationality enjoying this blend of hackysack, soccer, and volleyball.

== Style ==
Buak Hat Public Park is designed in the style of "idealized nature".

== Flowers ==
Buak Hat Public Park is at the center of the annual Flower Festival. There are also displays by landscape specialists, featuring waterfalls, patios and various schemes of garden decoration. There are stands representing gardens from neighbouring countries, and stands selling local products.

There are many types of flower in the park such as:

- Orange Jessamine
- Croton
- Climbing Ylang Ylang
- Ixora
- Rain Tree
- Tooth Blush Tree
- Banyan Tree
- Temple Tree
