= Chiranan Pitpreecha =

Thai poet and feminist

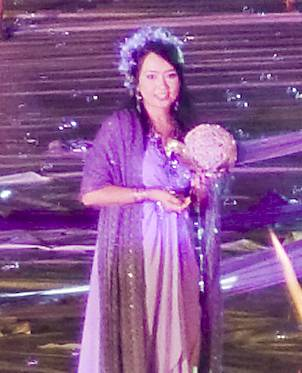
At the opening ceremony of the 38th National Games, 2009

Čhiranan Pitpreecha (born 1955) is a Thai poet and feminist. For a time, she had the married name Čhiranan Prasertkul. Her surname also appears as Phitprīchā. She is a recipient of the S.E.A. Write Award.

== Biography ==
The daughter of a bookstore owner, she was born in Trang Province. Pitpreecha was a prominent student activist in the 1973 Thai popular uprising; following the Thammasat University massacre in October 1976, she fled to the jungle and joined the Communist Party of Thailand. Pitpreecha returned to Bangkok in 1981. With her husband, Seksan Prasertkul, she went to the United States, where she earned a BA and MA in history from Cornell University. After her return to Thailand, she separated from her husband.

Pitpreecha's poem "Cracked Pebble" received an award for the best poem of 1981 from PEN International Thailand. She has written a variety of work, including poetry, history, travel articles, and social commentary, for various publications in Thailand. Her first collection of poems, Bai Mai Ti Hai Pai (The Missing Leaf) received the S.E.A. Write Award in 1989. In 1992, her poem "First Rain" was named best poem of the year by PEN International Thailand. In 2011, she was named one of the 65 most influential women in Thailand.

Her work has been translated into English, French, German, Russian, Japanese, and Malay.
