= The Moonhunter =

2001 Thai film by Bhandit Rittakol

- Film poster
- Directed by: Bhandit Rittakol
- Written by: Seksan Prasertkul; Bandit Ritthakol
- Produced by: Charoen Aimpuengphon; Thanit Jitnukul
- Starring: Phanu Suwanno; Pimphan Chantha; Kriangkrai Fukesom; Suphalak Chaoyuth; Phakchanok Woonsri
- Cinematography: Thirawat Rujintham
- Edited by: Sunid Aswinikul; Thanin Thiankaew
- Distributed by: Five Star Production; BEC Tero
- Release date: October 12, 2001
- Running time: 122 minutes
- Country: Thailand
- Language: Thai
- Budget: ฿20 million

The Moonhunter (Thai: 14 ตุลา สงครามประชาชน) is a 2001 Thai epic historical political thriller film directed by Bhandit Rittakol and co-written by Seksan Prasertkul. The film follows a student leader during the 1973 Thai popular uprising. It was Thailand's submission to the 74th Academy Awards for the Academy Award for Best Foreign Language Film, but was not accepted as a nominee.

== Cast ==
- Phanu Suwanno
- Pimphan Chantha
- Kriangkrai Fukesom
- Suphalak Chaoyuth
- Phakchanok Woonsri

== See also ==
- Cinema of Thailand
- List of submissions to the 74th Academy Awards for Best Foreign Language Film
- 1973 Thai popular uprising
