= Boyscout (Thai band) =

Thai boy band

- Origin: Bangkok, Thailand
- Genres: Pop; Dance-pop; Raprock
- Years active: 1992–1996; 2011–2017
- Label: RS Promotion
- Past members: Ta-Winrawee Yaisamoe; Dip–Soangphol Khaipongpan; Joe–Tanut Chimtaum

Boyscout (Thai: บอยสเก๊าท์) was a Thai boy band famous and popular in the 1990s under RS Promotion.

== History ==
All three members of this band were former actors who were played as the students in A-Nueng-Kid-Tung-Por-Sung-Khaeb (Thai: อนึ่งคิดถึงพอสังเขป). Boyscout was the first boy band to form as a trio at RS Promotion. They were the second boy band to appear with Hijack.

The band released two studio albums in 1993 and 1995, and a one-off special album.

While promoting the release of their third studio album, band member Ta-Winrawee was found to be a drug criminal. Because of this, they decided to eventually split up.

After 15 years, Boyscout returned as a band again. They regained some fame, until Joe-Tanut Chimtaum died from a heart attack on September 11, 2017.

== Members ==
- Ta-Winrawee Yaisamoe (ต๊ะ : วินรวีร์ ใหญ่เสมอ) born name Chanis Yaisamoe (ฌานิศ ใหญ่เสมอ)
- Dip–Soangphol Khaipongpan (ดิ๊พ : ทรงพล คล้ายพงษ์พันธ์) born name Thanaphol Khaipongpan (ธนพงษ์ คล้ายพงษ์พันธ์)
- Joe–Tanut Chimtaum (โจ : ธนัท ฉิมท้วม)(death September 11, 2017) born name Thaneth Chimtaum (ธเนศ ฉิมท้วม)

== Discography ==
=== Studio albums ===
- Wai Lai Mai Chai Len Len (ไว้ลายไม่ใช่เล่นๆ) 1993
- Gang Jai Ngai (Easy Gangster) (แก๊งใจง่าย) 1995
- Small Dream Project 2011

=== Compilation albums ===
- R.S. Unplugged 1994
- Superteens 1996
- Boyscout Replay 1996

== Filmography ==
- I Miss You (อนึ่งคิดถึงพอสังเขป) (lead role by Ann Thongprasom) 1992
