= Thai cultural restoration of 1946–48 =

Thai cultural restoration of 1946–48 was the cultural and social policy of the government of Khuang Aphaiwong and Pridi Banomyong following Thailand's participation in World War II. It abolished the Thai cultural mandates that had been introduced between 1939 and 1942 by the government of Plaek Phibunsongkhram with the goal of modernising the country and abolishing traditional practices, which were seen as backwards. Khuang Aphaiwong, a conservative royalist, decided to order a restoration of traditional Thai culture to reverse the wartime policy of Phibunsongkhram. On 8 April 1948, a military coup d'état forced Khuang out of office and Phibunsongkhram assumed the premiership a second time. The cultural policy of Khuang and Pridi was canceled

The hallmarks of the cultural restoration, as promulgated in January 1946, were:

- Restore Songkran Day as traditional new year day along with modern Gregorian calendar New Year's Day.
- Abolish Thai cultural mandates.
- Abolish Thai spelling reform of 1942 has been used since the Phibun period, Khuang supports encourages the use of the correct Thai writing system.
- Promulgate Thai noble titles back and return the title to politician who was canceled.
- Adopt traditional Raj pattern uniform with the wearing of Chang Kben (Chong kraben) and used formal Thai national costume.

On 7 September 1946 the Thai government announced that the name of the country would revert to Siam, since the country did not only belong to the Thai race. The name reverted to Thailand in 1949.

After the coup d'état in 1947, in which Khuang was restored to power, the Supreme Council of State of Siam (Thai: อภิรัฐมนตรีสภา), which was dissolved during the Siamese revolution of 1932, was restored.

== See also ==
- History of Thailand (1932–1973)
- Thai cultural mandates
