= History of Thailand (1932–1973) =

Period of modern Thai history

Early 20th-century Siam/Thailand
- 24 June 1932 – 14 October 1973
Rattanakosin period	Late 20th century
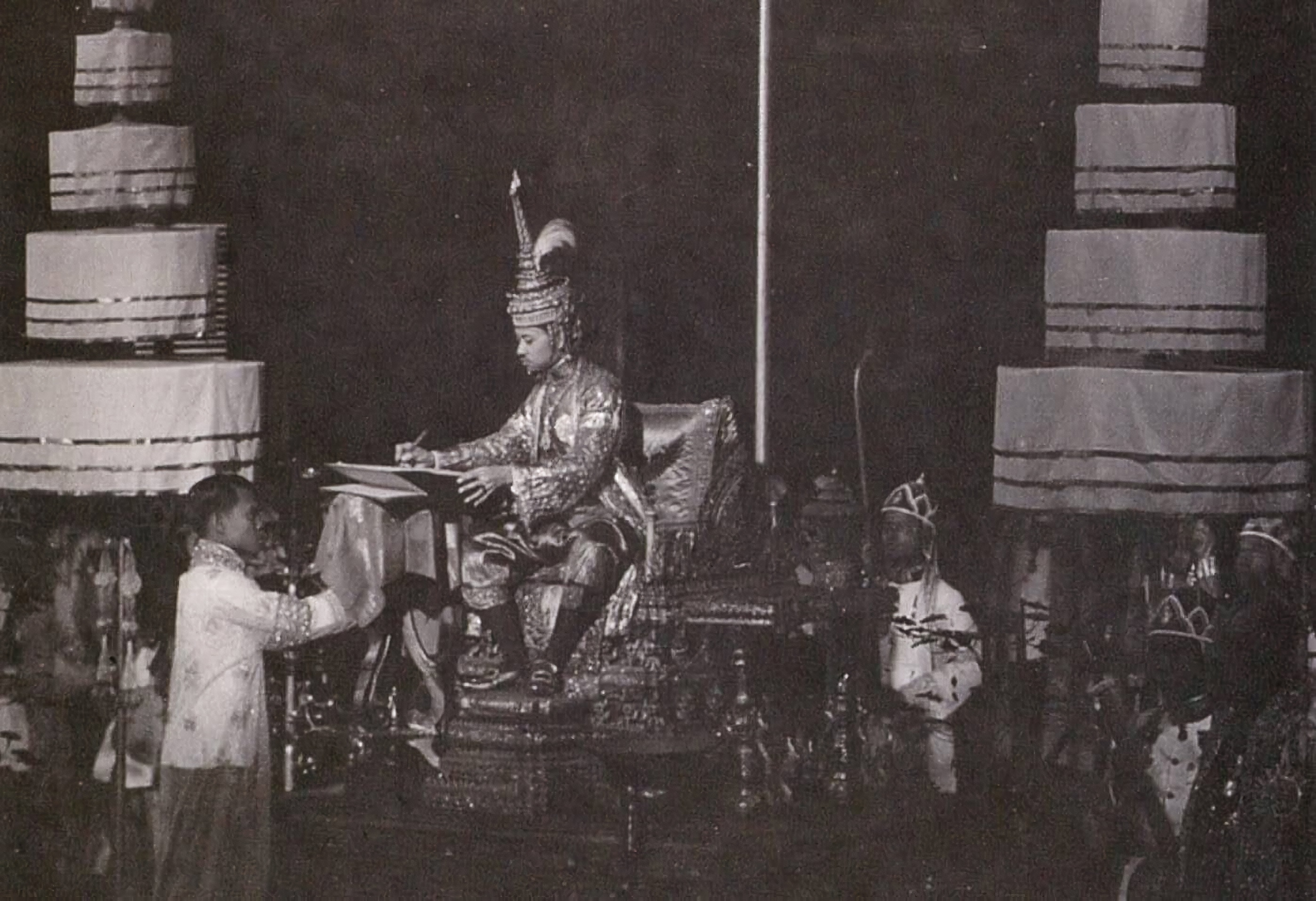
- King Prajadhipok signing the 1932 Constitution of the Kingdom of Siam on 10 December 1932
- Monarchs: Prajadhipok (Rama VII); Ananda Mahidol (Rama VIII); Bhumibol Adulyadej (Rama IX)
- Leaders: Manopakorn Nitithada; Phahon Phonphayuhasena; Plaek Phibunsongkhram; Khuang Aphaiwong; Thawi Bunyaket; Seni Pramoj; Pridi Banomyong; Thawan Thamrongnawasawat; Pote Sarasin; Thanom Kittikachorn; Sarit Thanarat
- Key events: Siamese revolution; April 1933 coup; June 1933 coup; Boworadet Rebellion; Rebellion of the Sergeants; Songsuradet rebellion; Franco-Thai War; Japanese invasion; World War II; Cultural restoration; 1947 coup; 1948 coup; Korean War; Army General Staff plot; Palace Rebellion; Manhattan Rebellion; Silent Coup; 1957 coup; 1958 coup; Vietnam War; Communist insurgency; 1971 coup; 14 October uprising

The history of Thailand from 1932 to 1973 was dominated by military dictatorships which were in power for much of the period. The main personalities of the period were the dictator Plaek Phibunsongkhram, who allied the country with Japan during the Second World War, and the civilian politician Pridi Banomyong, who founded Thammasat University and was briefly prime minister after the war.

A succession of military dictators followed Pridi's ouster—Phibun again, Sarit Thanarat, then Thanom Kittikachorn—under whom traditional, authoritarian rule was combined with increasing modernisation and Westernisation under the influence of the United States. The end of the period was marked by Thanom's resignation, following an uprising by university students.

From 1939 (excluding a few months in 1946), the official name of Thailand was changed from the Kingdom of Siam to the Kingdom of Thailand, which is still the official name of Thailand today.

== Siamese revolution (1932–1939) ==
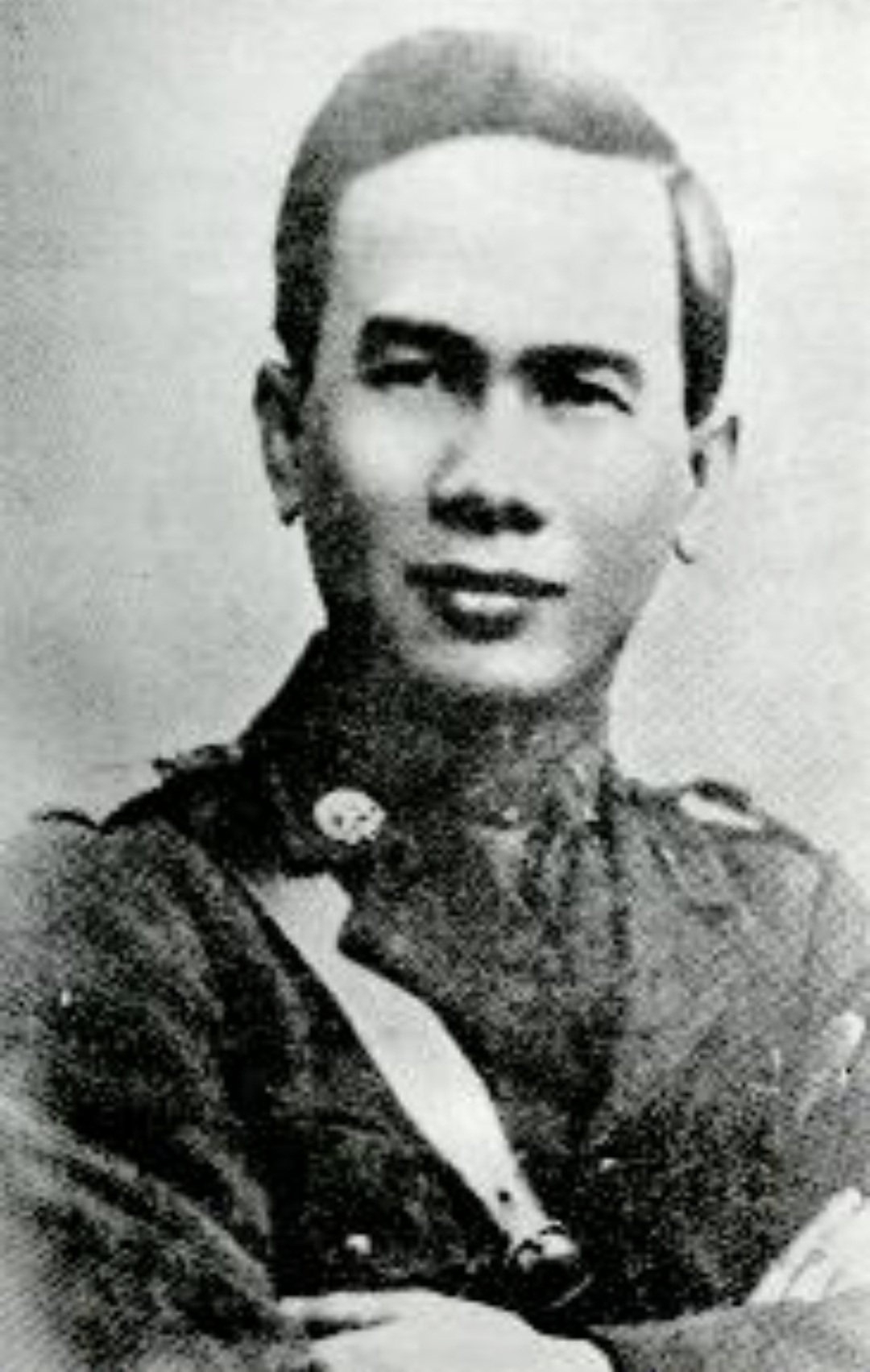
Major Plaek Phibunsongkhram, leader of the young army and navy faction

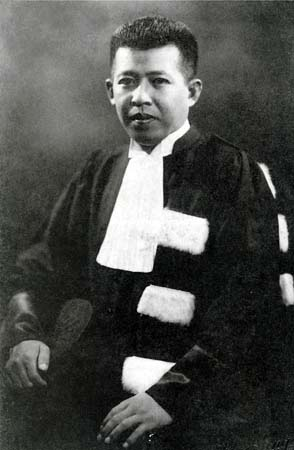
Pridi Banomyong, leader of the civilian faction

The military came to power in the bloodless Siamese revolution of 1932, which transformed the government of Siam from an absolute to a constitutional monarchy. King Prajadhipok initially accepted this change but later abdicated due to his strained relations with the government. Upon his abdication, King Prajadhipok issued a brief statement criticising the regime. His statement included the following phrases—often quoted by critics of the slow pace of Siam's political development:

I am willing to surrender the powers I formerly exercised to the people as a whole, but I am not willing to turn them over to any individual or any group to use in an autocratic manner without heeding the voice of the people.

The new regime of 1932 was led by a group of colonels headed by Phraya Phahon Phonphayuhasena and Phraya Songsuradet. In December they produced Siam's first constitution. Which included a national assembly, half appointed and half indirectly elected. The people were promised that full democratic elections would be held once half the population had completed primary education—which was expected to be sometime in the 1940s. A prime minister and cabinet were appointed and a facade of constitutional rule was maintained.

Once the new government had been established and the constitution put into effect, conflict began to erupt among the members of the new ruling coalition. There were four major factions competing for power: the older conservative civilian faction led by Phraya Manopakorn Nitithada; the senior military faction led by Phraya Phahon; the junior army and navy faction led by Luang Phibunsongkhram; and the young civilian faction led by Pridi Banomyong.

The first serious conflict arose in 1933 when Pridi was given the task of drafting a new economic plan for the nation. His radical programme called for the nationalisation of large tracts of farmland as well as rapid government-directed industrialisation. It also called for the growth of higher education so that entry into the bureaucracy would not be completely dominated by royalty and the aristocracy. However, the plan was condemned immediately by most of the government factions as being communist.

Because of its attack on private property, the members of the conservative clique were the ones most alarmed by Pridi's plan. They urged the Mano government to adopt policies that would reverse the course of the "revolution". However, when Phraya Mano attempted to do this, Phibun and Phraya Phahon launched a second coup that toppled the Mano government. Phraya Pahon was made the new prime minister, and his new government excluded all of the royalists.

=== Civil war and abdication of Prajadhipok ===
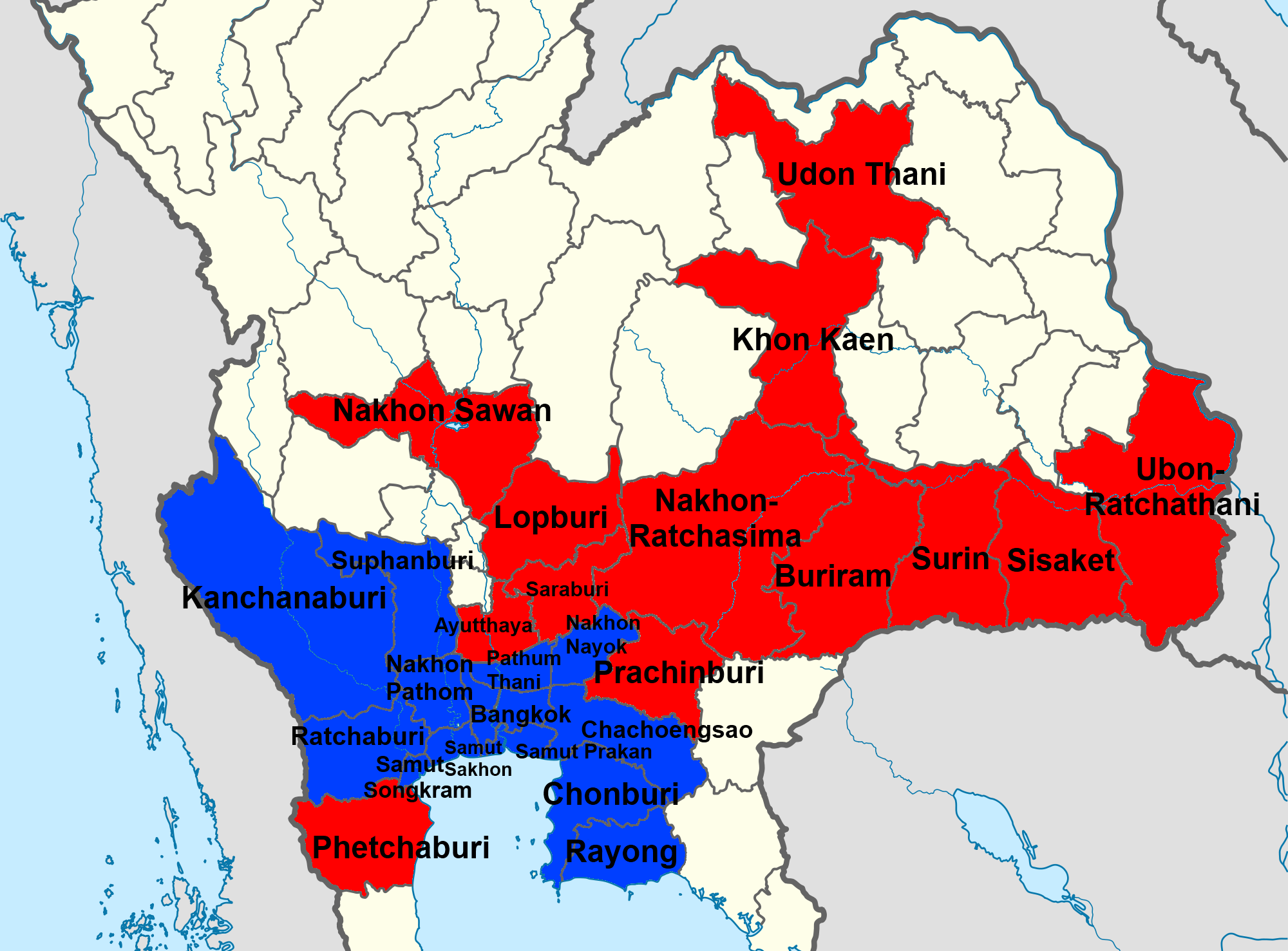
Thailand map of 1933, show the conflicts of provinces between the royalist rebels and the Government. Provinces that joined the Prince Boworadet's Army Provinces that were loyal to the government.

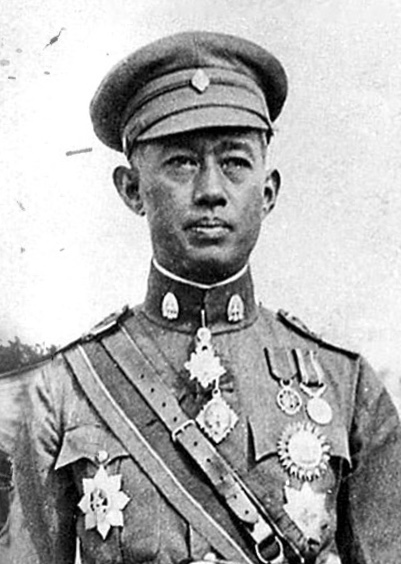
Prince Boworadet, leader of the Rebellion.

A royalist reaction came in late 1933 when Prince Boworadet, a grandson of Mongkut and one-time Minister of Defence, led an armed revolt against the government. He mobilised various provincial garrisons and marched on Bangkok, capturing the Don Muang Aerodrome along the way. The prince accused the government of disrespecting the king and promoting communism, and he demanded that the government leaders resign. He had hoped that some of the garrisons in the Bangkok area would join the revolt, but they remained loyal to the government. Meanwhile, the navy declared itself neutral and left for its bases in the south. After heavy fighting in the northern outskirts of Bangkok, the royalists were finally defeated and Prince Boworadet left for exile in French Indochina.

One effect of the repression of the insurrection was the diminution of the king's prestige. After the revolt started, King Prajadhipok declared in a telegram that he regretted the strife and civil disturbances. It is not clear whether he was motivated by a fear of being captured by rebels, a fear of being viewed as a supporter of the rebels, or a wish to avoid further choices between Phahon and Boworadet. Either way, the fact remains that at the height of the conflict, the royal couple took refuge at Songkhla. The king's withdrawal from the scene of the fighting was interpreted by the victorious party as a sign that he had failed in his duty. By refusing to give his full support to the legitimate government, his credibility was undermined.

A few months later in 1934, King Prajadhipok, whose relations with the new government had been deteriorating for some time, went abroad to receive medical treatment. While abroad, he carried on a correspondence with the government that discussed the terms under which he would continue to serve as a constitutional monarch. He requested the continuation of some traditional royal prerogatives. The government, however, would not agree.

In his abdication speech, Prajadhipok accused the government of having no regard for democratic principles, employing methods of administration incompatible with individual freedom and the principles of justice, ruling in an autocratic manner and not letting the people have a real voice in Siam's affairs. In 1934, the Press Act came into effect, forbidding the publication of any material deemed to be detrimental to the public order or to undermine morals. The law has been strictly enforced to the present day.

Reaction to the abdication was muted. Everybody was afraid of what might happen next. The government refrained from challenging any assertions in the king's abdication statement for fear of arousing further controversy. Opponents of the government kept quiet after the failure of the royalist rebellion.

Having defeated the royalists, the government now was put to the test of living up to the promises on which it had come to power. It took much more aggressive steps to carry out some important reforms. The currency went off the gold standard, allowing trade to recover. Expenditures on education were increased four-fold, thereby significantly raising the literacy rate. Elected local and provincial governments were introduced, and in November 1937 democratic development was brought forward when direct elections were held for the national assembly, although political parties were still not allowed. Thammasat University was founded, at Pridi's initiative, as a more accessible alternative to the elitist Chulalongkorn University. Military expenditure was also greatly expanded, a clear indication of the increasing influence of the military. In the years between 1934 and 1940 the kingdom's army, navy, and air force were equipped as never before.

=== Accession of King Ananda Mahidol ===
After King Prajadhipok left Siam and abdicated the following year, The government then chose Prince Ananda Mahidol, who was at that time in school in Switzerland, as the next king, becoming King Rama VIII. For the first time in history, Siam was without a resident monarch and was to remain so for the next fifteen years, the Khana Ratsadon believing that he would be more pliable than Prajadhipok.

== From Siam to Thailand (1939–1946) ==
=== Rise of Phibunsongkhram ===
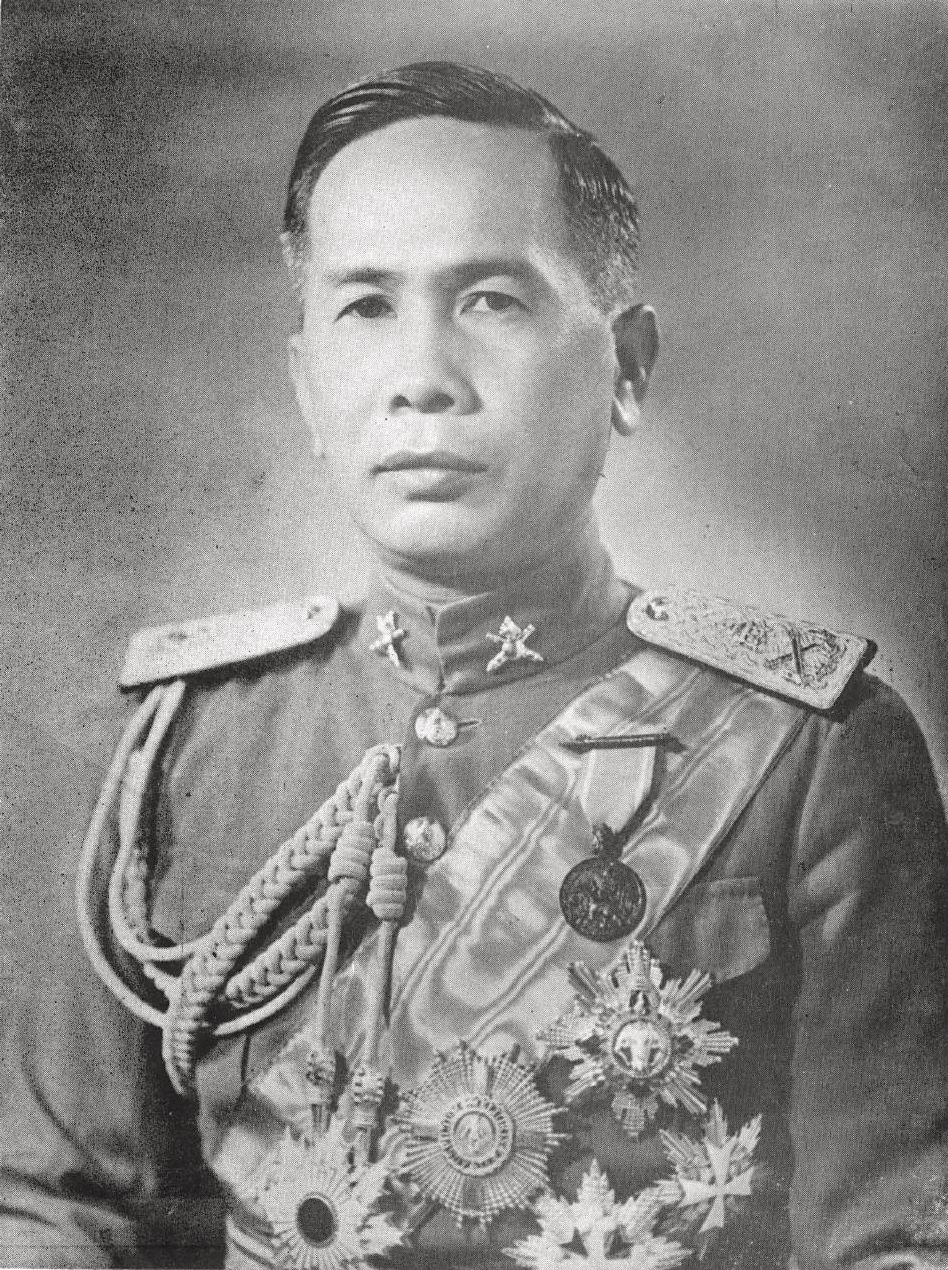
Plaek Phibunsongkhram, Prime Minister of Thailand, 1938–1944, 1948–1957

The military, now led by Major General Phibun as defence minister, and the civilian liberals led by Pridi as foreign minister, worked together harmoniously for several years, but when Phibun became prime minister in December 1938 this co-operation broke down, and military domination became more overt. Phibun was an admirer of Benito Mussolini, and his regime soon developed some fascist characteristics. In early 1939 forty political opponents, both monarchists and democrats, were arrested, and after rigged trials eighteen were executed, the first political executions in Siam in over a century. Many others, among them Prince Damrong Rajanubhab and Phraya Songsuradej, were exiled. Phibun launched a demagogic campaign against the Chinese business class. Chinese schools and newspapers were closed, and taxes on Chinese businesses increased.

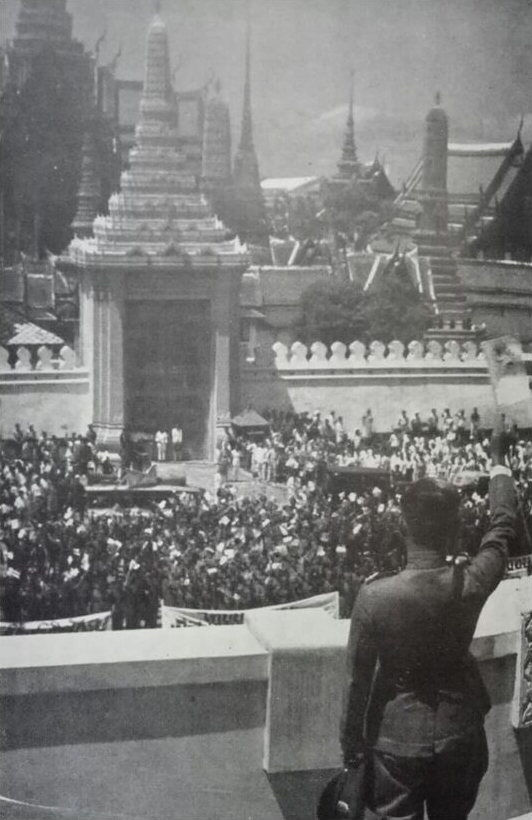
Phibun gives an ultranationalist speech to the crowds at the Grand Palace in 1940.

Phibun and Luang Wichitwathakan, the government's ideological spokesman, copied the propaganda techniques used by Hitler and Mussolini to build up the cult of the leader. Aware of the power of mass media, they used the government's monopoly on radio broadcasting to shape popular support for the regime. Popular government slogans were constantly aired on the radio and plastered on newspapers and billboards. Phibun's picture was also to be seen everywhere in society, while portraits of the ex-monarch King Prajadhipok, an outspoken critic of the autocratic regime, were banned. At the same time Phibun passed a number of authoritarian laws which gave the government the power of almost unlimited arrest and complete press censorship. During the Second World War, newspapers were instructed to print only good news emanating from Axis sources, while sarcastic comments about the internal situation were banned.

=== Fascist Thailand ===
On 23 June 1939, Phibun changed the country's name from Siam to Prathet Thai (Thai: ประเทศไทย), or Thailand, said to mean "land of the free". This was a nationalist gesture: it implied the unity of all the Tai-speaking peoples, including the Lao and the Shan, but excluding the Chinese. The regime's slogan became "Thailand for the Thai."

==== Cultural revolution ====
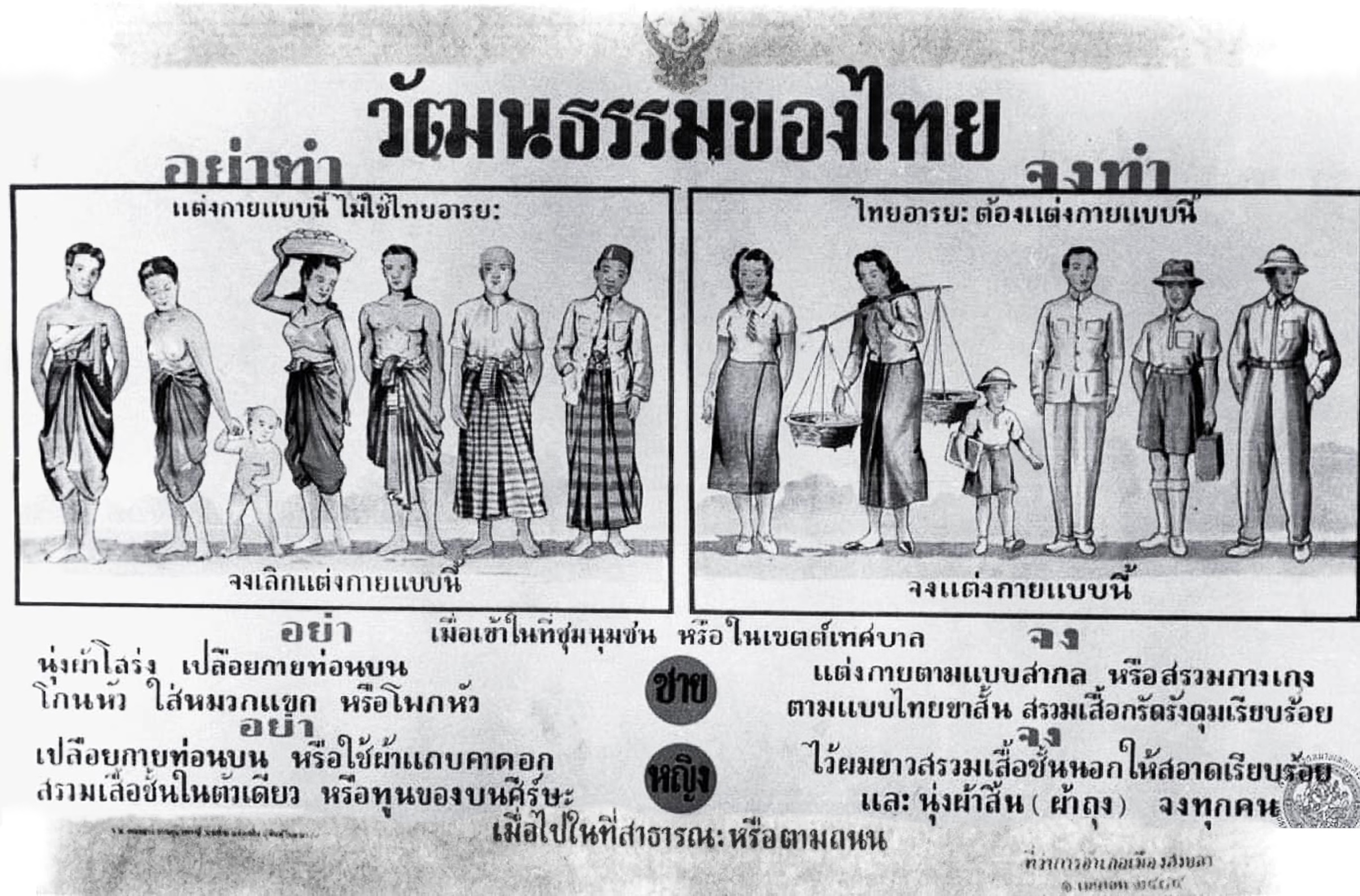
Thai poster from the cultural mandate era demonstrating prohibited dress on the left and proper dress on the right.

Modernisation was also an important theme in Phibun's new Thai nationalism. From 1939 to 1942 he issued a set of twelve cultural mandates. In addition to requiring that all Thais salute the flag, know the national anthem, and speak the national language, the mandates also encouraged Thais to work hard, stay informed on current events, and to dress in a Western fashion. By 1941 it became illegal, among other things, to ridicule those who attempted to promote national customs. The programme also encompassed fine arts. Fiercely nationalistic plays and films were sponsored by the government. Often these depicted a glorious past when Thai warriors fearlessly gained freedom for the country, defended their honour, or sacrificed themselves. Patriotism was taught in schools and was a recurrent theme in songs and dances.

At the same time, Phibun worked rigorously to rid society of its royalist influences. Traditional royal holidays were replaced with new national events and royal and aristocratic titles were abandoned. Ironically, he retained his aristocratic surname. Even the Sangha was affected when the status of the royally sponsored Thammayuth sect was downgraded.

Meanwhile, all cinemas were instructed to display Phibun's picture at the end of every performance as if it were the king's portrait, and the audience were expected to rise and bow. Another aspect of Phibun's growing personality cult was becoming apparent in official décor. He was born in the year of the cock, and this symbol began to replace the wheel. Similarly, Phibun's auspicious birth-colour, green, was used in official decorations.

=== Franco-Thai War ===
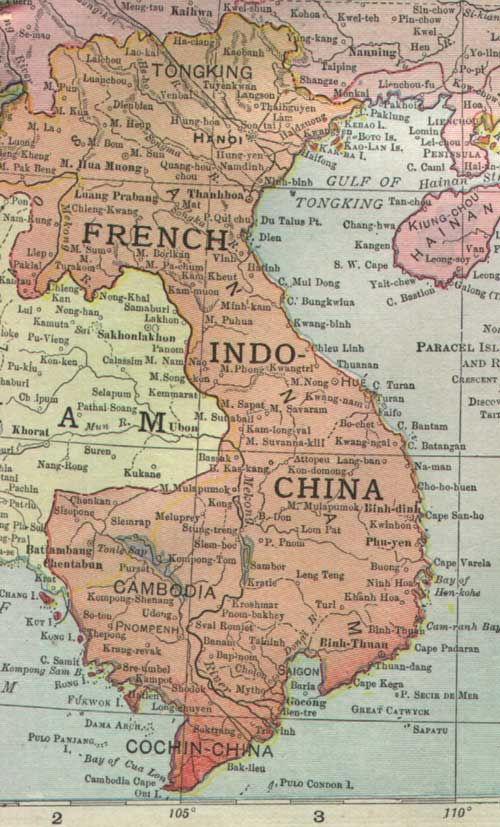
Map of French Indochina in 1913

In 1940, most of France was occupied by Nazi Germany, and Phibun immediately set out to avenge Siam's humiliations by France in 1893 and 1904, when the French had used force to redraw the borders of Siam with Laos and Cambodia, requiring the Thais to sign a series of unequal treaties. To accomplish that, the Thai government needed Japanese assistance against France, which was secured through the Treaty between Thailand and Japan Concerning the Continuance of Friendly Relations and the Mutual Respect of Each Other's Territorial Integrity, concluded in June 1940. Also concluded in 1940 was the British-Thai Non-Aggression Pact between the governments of Great Britain and the Kingdom of Thailand. On 18 July 1940, the British government accepted Japanese demands to close the Burma Road for three months to prevent war supplies from reaching China. As the government of Thailand was now becoming aligned with the Japanese, the British government concluded the pact with Bangkok so as not to antagonize Tokyo.

Luang Wichit wrote a number of popular dramas that glorified the idea of many ethnic groups belonging to a greater "Thai" empire and condemned the evils of European colonial rule. Irredentist and anti-French demonstrations were incessantly held around Bangkok, and in late 1940 border skirmishes erupted along the Mekong frontier. In 1941 the skirmishes turned into the small–scale Franco-Thai War between Vichy France and Thailand. Thai forces dominated the war on the ground and in the air, but the Thai Navy suffered a crushing naval defeat at the battle of Ko Chang. The Japanese then stepped in to mediate the conflict. The final settlement thus returned most of the disputed areas in Laos and Cambodia to Thailand.

=== World War II ===
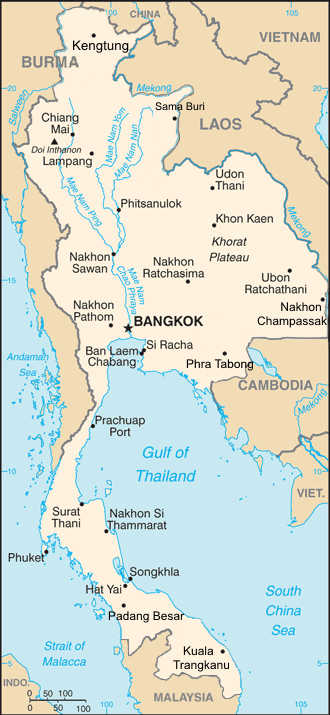
The Kingdom of Thailand and its acquired territories in WWII

In April 1941 the United States cut off petroleum supplies to Thailand. Thailand's brief period of glory came to an end on 8 December 1941 when Japan invaded the country along its southeastern coastline and from Cambodia. After initially resisting, the Phibun regime gave in and allowed the Japanese to pass through the country to attack Burma and invade Malaya. Convinced by the Allied defeats of early 1942 that Japan was winning the war, Phibun decided to form a military alliance with Imperial Japan.

In return, Japan allowed Thailand to invade and annex the Shan States and Kayah State in northern Burma, and resume sovereignty over the sultanates of northern Malaya which had been surrendered in the Anglo-Siamese Treaty of 1909 with Britain. In January 1942 Phibun declared war on Britain and the United States, though the Thai ambassador to the United States, Seni Pramoj, refused to deliver it to the State Department. Seni denounced the Phibun regime as illegal and formed a Seri Thai Movement in Washington. Pridi, now serving in the role of an almost powerless regent, led the resistance movement inside Thailand, while former Queen Ramphaiphanni was the nominal head in Great Britain.

Secret training camps were set up in remote areas, the majority by the populist politician Tiang Sirikhanth in the northeast region of the country. There were a dozen camps alone in Sakhon Nakhon Province. Clandestine airfields also appeared in the northeast, where Royal Air Force and United States Army Air Forces planes brought in supplies, as well as Special Operations Executive, Office of Strategic Services, and Seri Thai agents, at the same time evacuating escaped prisoners of war. By early 1945, Thai air force officers were performing liaison duties with South East Asia Command in Kandy and Calcutta.

By 1944, it was evident that the Japanese were going to lose the war, and their behaviour in Thailand had become increasingly arrogant. Bangkok also suffered heavily from Allied strategic bombing. Coupled with economic hardships caused by the loss of Thailand's rice export markets, this made both the war and Phibun's regime very unpopular. In July 1944 Phibun was ousted by the Seri Thai-infiltrated government. The national assembly reconvened and appointed the liberal lawyer Khuang Aphaiwong as prime minister. The new government hastily evacuated the British territories that Phibun had occupied and surreptitiously aided the Seri Thai movement, while at the same time maintaining ostensibly friendly relations with the Japanese.

The Japanese surrendered on 15 August 1945. Immediately, Allied military responsibility for Thailand fell to the British. As soon as practicable, British and Indian troops were flown in and rapidly secured the release of surviving POWs. The British were surprised to find that the Japanese soldiers had already been largely disarmed by the Thais.

Britain regarded Thailand as having been partly responsible for the damage dealt to the Allied cause and favoured treating the kingdom as a defeated enemy. However, the US had no sympathy for what they considered British and French colonialism and supported the new government. Thailand thus received little punishment for its wartime role under Phibun.

== Post-war Thailand (1946–1957) ==
Seni Pramoj became prime minister in 1945 and promptly restored the name Siam as a symbol of the end of Phibun's nationalist regime. However, he found his position at the head of a cabinet packed with Pridi's loyalists quite uncomfortable. Northeastern populist politicians like Tiang Sirikhanth and Bangkok upstarts like Sanguan Tularaksa were not the sort that the aristocratic Seni preferred to associate with. They, in turn, viewed Seni as an elitist who was entirely out of touch with Thailand's political realities. Pridi continued to wield power behind the scenes as he had done during the Khuang government. The regent's looming presence and overarching authority rankled the proud, thin-skinned Seni, fuelling a personal animosity that would poison Thailand's postwar politics.

Following the signature by Thailand of the Washington Accord of 1946, the territories that had been annexed after the Franco-Thai War, which included Phibunsongkhram Province, Nakhon Champassak Province, Phra Tabong Province, Koh Kong Province, and Lan Chang Province, were returned to Cambodia and Laos.

=== January 1946 democratic elections ===
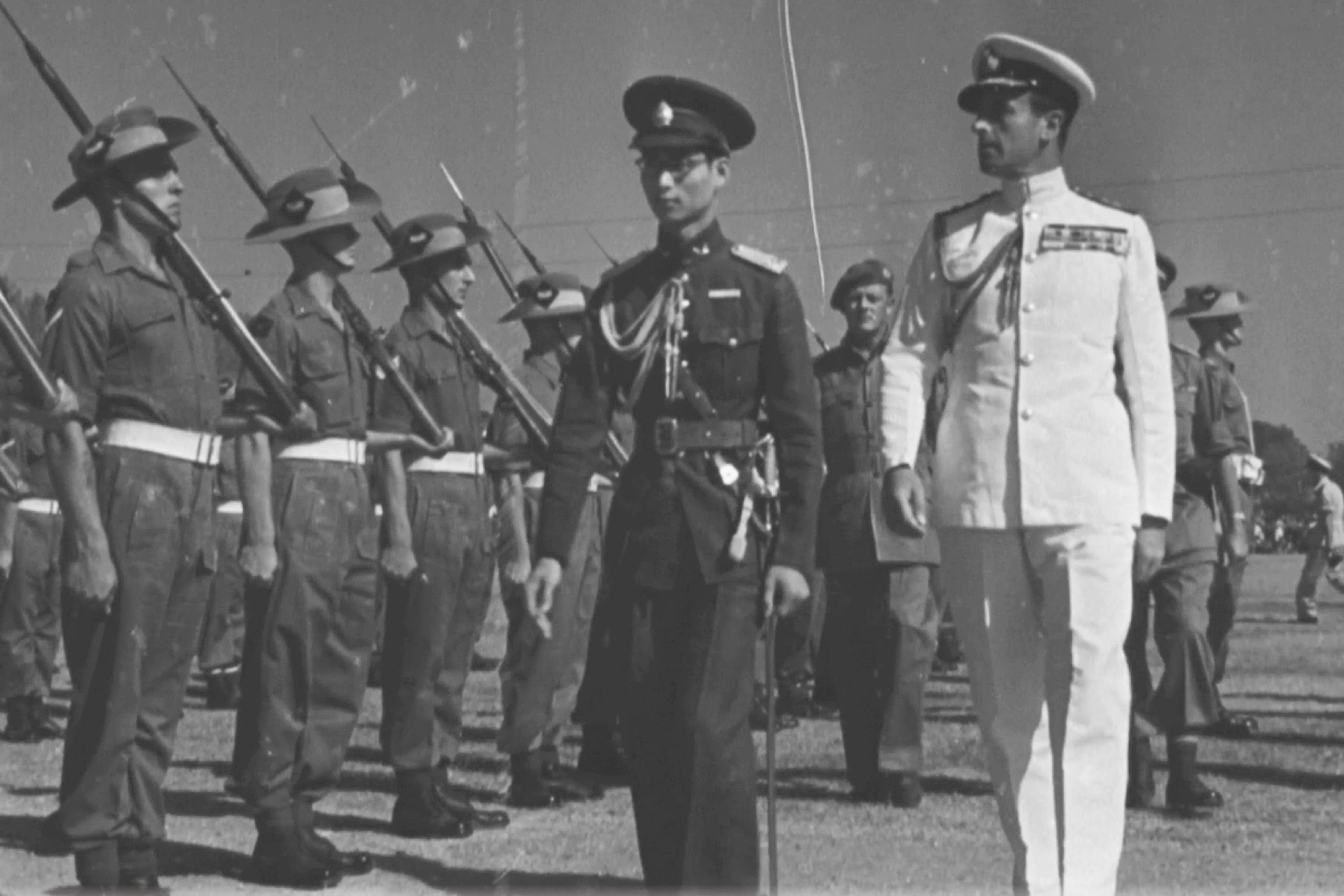
King Ananda Mahidol and Louis Mountbatten in 1946

Democratic elections were subsequently held in January 1946. These were the first elections in which political parties were legal, and Pridi's People's Party and its allies won a majority. In March 1946 Pridi became Siam's first democratically elected prime minister. In 1946, after he agreed to hand back the Indochinese territories occupied in 1941 as the price for admission to the United Nations, all wartime claims against Siam were dropped and a substantial package of US aid was received.

=== King Bhumibol Adulyadej ===
In December 1945, the young King Ananda Mahidol had returned to Siam from Europe, but in June 1946, he was found shot dead in his bedroom under mysterious circumstances. Three palace servants were tried and executed for his murder, although there are significant doubts as to their guilt and the case remains both murky and a highly sensitive topic in Thailand today. The king was succeeded by his younger brother, Bhumibol Adulyadej, who became King Rama IX. In August, Pridi was forced to resign amid suspicion that he had been involved in the regicide. Without his leadership, the civilian government floundered, and in November 1947 the army, its confidence restored after the debacle of 1945, seized power. After an interim Khuang-headed government, in April 1948 the army brought Phibun back from exile and made him prime minister. Pridi, in turn, was driven into exile, eventually settling in Beijing as a guest of the People's Republic of China.

=== Phibunsongkhram's second premiership ===
Thai Triumvirate, 1947–1957

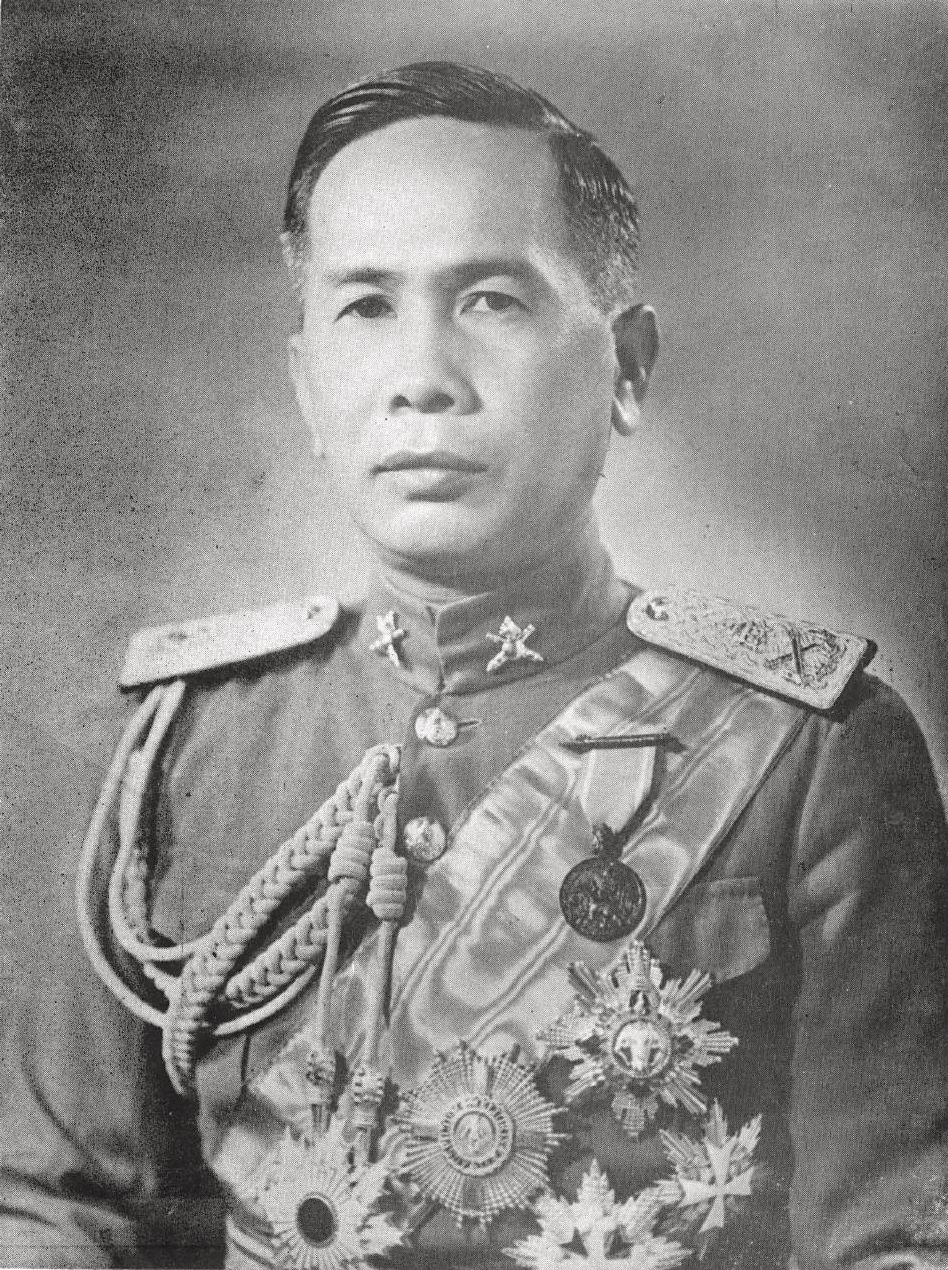
Field Marshal Plaek Phibunsongkhram

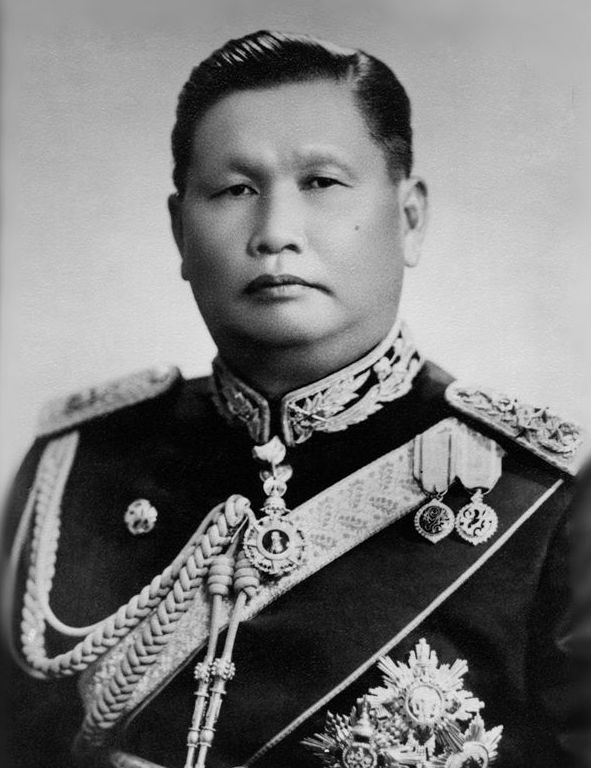
Field Marshal Sarit Thanarat

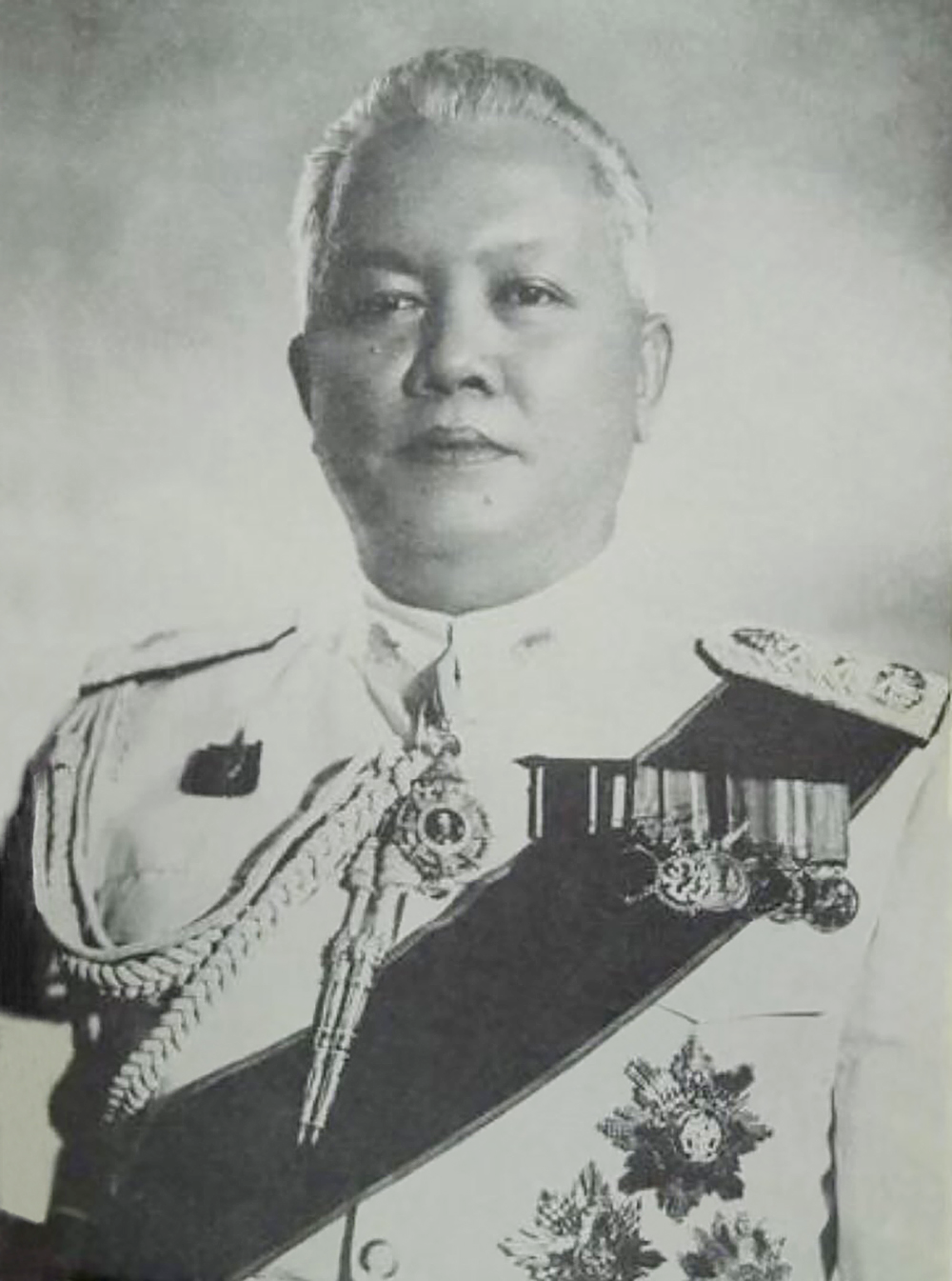
Police General Phao Siyanon

Phibun's return to power coincided with the onset of the Cold War and the establishment of a communist regime in North Vietnam. He soon won the support of the US, beginning a long tradition of US-backed military regimes in Thailand (as the country was again renamed in July 1949, this time permanently).

Once again political opponents were arrested and tried, and some were executed. During this time, several of the key figures in the wartime Free Thai underground, including Thawin Udom, Thawi Thawethikul, Chan Bunnag, and Tiang Sirikhanth, were eliminated in extra-legal fashion by the Thai police, run by Phibun's ruthless associate Phao Siyanon. There were attempted counter-coups by Pridi supporters in 1948, 1949, and 1951, the second leading to heavy fighting between the army and navy before Phibun emerged victorious. In the navy's 1951 attempt, popularly known as the Manhattan Coup, Phibun was nearly killed when the ship where he was held hostage was bombed by the pro-government air force.

=== New constitution in 1949 ===
In 1949 a new constitution was promulgated, creating a senate appointed by the king (in practice, by the government). But in 1951 the regime abolished its own constitution and reverted to the 1932 arrangements, effectively abolishing the national assembly as an elected body. This provoked strong opposition from the universities and the press and led to a further round of trials and repression. The regime was greatly helped, however, by a postwar boom which gathered pace through the 1950s, fuelled by rice exports and US aid. Thailand's economy began to diversify, while the population and urbanisation increased.

=== Downfall of Phibunsongkhram ===
In 1956, it became clearer that Plaek, allied to Phao, was losing to another influential groups led by Sarit, and consisted of "Sakdina" (royalties and royalists). Both Plaek and Phao intended to bring home Pridi Banomyong to clear his name from the mystery around the death of King Rama VIII. However, the US government disapproved, cancelling the plan. In June 1957, he told one of Pridi's son to "tell your father that I want [him] to come back [and] help me work for the nation. I alone can no longer contest Sakdina."

== Restoration of the monarchy by Sarit (1957–1963) ==
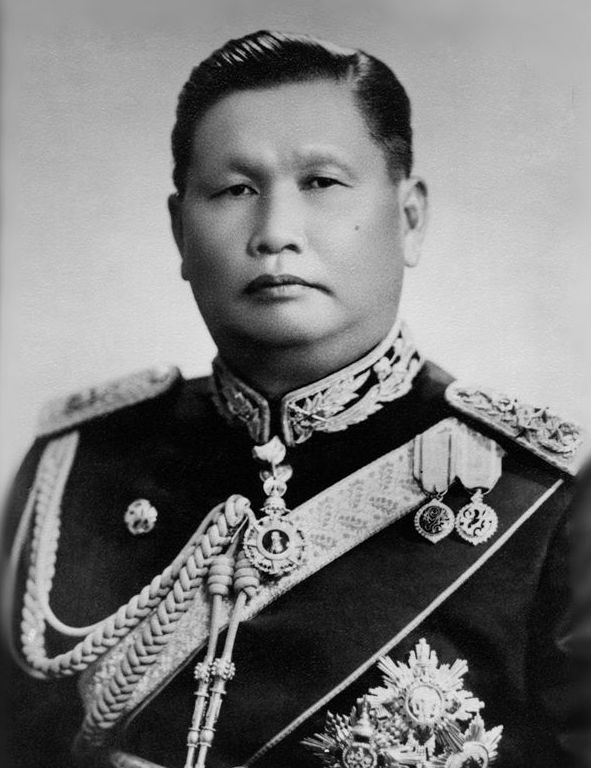
Sarit Thanarat, Prime Minister of Thailand, 1958–1963

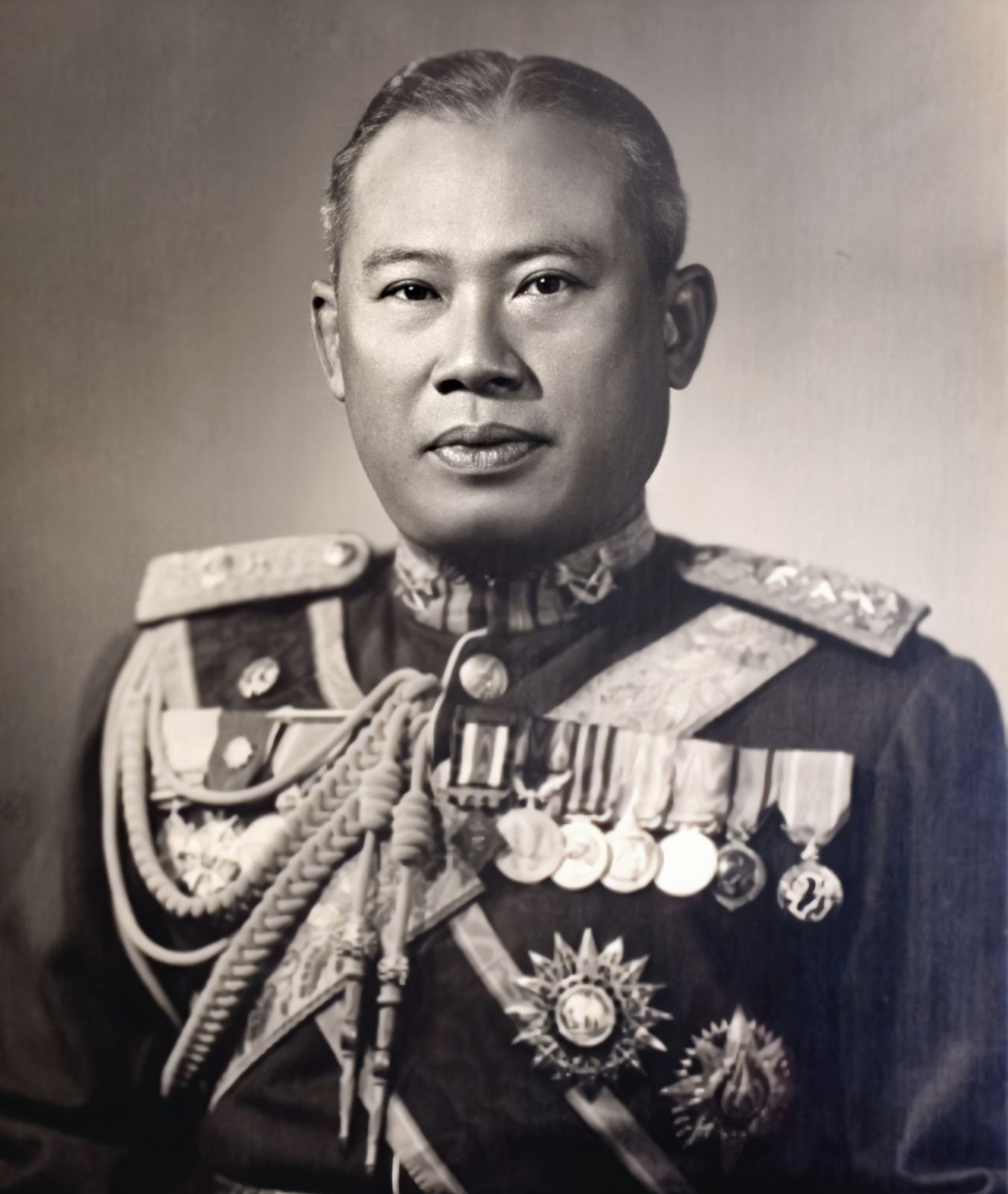
Thanom Kittikachorn, Prime Minister of Thailand, 1958, 1963–1973

By 1955, Phibun was losing his leading position in the army to younger rivals, led by Field Marshal Sarit Thanarat (Commander of the First Army) and General Thanom Kittikachorn. To shore up his position he restored the 1949 constitution and called elections, which his supporters won. But the army was not prepared to give up power, and in September 1957 it demanded Phibun's resignation. When Phibun tried to have Sarit arrested, the army staged a bloodless coup on 17 September 1957, ending Phibun's career for good.

Sarit restored the monarchy so well that by Thanom's time their rule was a close partnership between the military and the king. Sarit acted as a protector of the monarchy and defended against threats of communism emerged during the Cold War. By moving away from Western-style democracy, he paved the way for a Thai version with the monarchy as a moral basis. In this period the monarchy was restored the power it had before the Siamese revolution in 1932.

== Cold War and pro-American period (1963–1973) ==
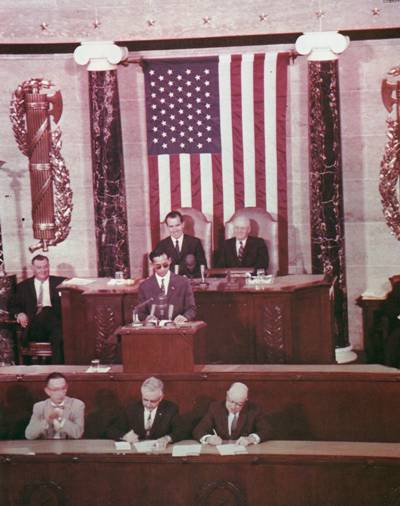
King Bhumibol Adulyadej addresses a joint session of the United States Congress, 1960

Thanom became prime minister until 1958, then yielded his place to Sarit, the real head of the regime. Sarit held power until his death in 1963, when Thanom again took the lead.

Sarit and Thanom were the first Thai leaders to have been educated entirely in Thailand, and were less influenced by European political ideas, whether fascist or democratic, than the generation of Pridi and Phibun had been. Rather, they were Thai traditionalists, who sought to restore the prestige of the monarchy and to maintain a society based on order, hierarchy, and religion. They sought to get rid of criminals, separatists, and drug dealers. They also appealed to the masses by promising social and economic development. They saw rule by the army as the best means of ensuring this, and also of defeating communism, which they now associated with Thailand's traditional enemies, the Vietnamese. Through despotic paternalism, Sarit's persona is characterized as being det khat, a Thai term meaning tough, decisive, and uncompromising. Although repressive, Sarit justified his harsh measures with good governance. In a pho-look relationship, he acted as the father of the people he's serving. perception The young King Bhumibol, who returned to Thailand in 1951, co-operated with this project. The Thai monarchy's present elevated status thus has its origins in this era.

=== U.S. Military bases in Thailand ===
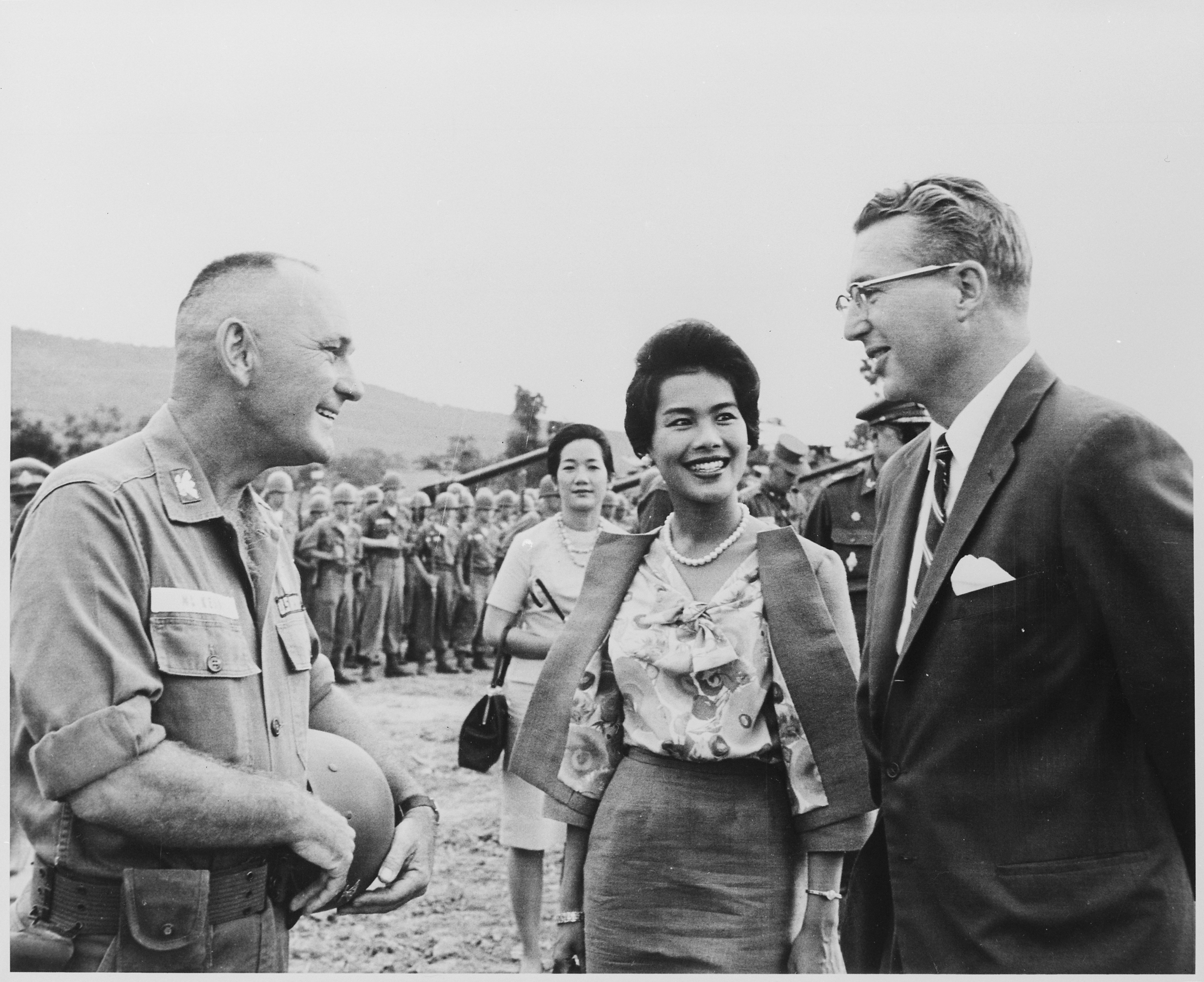
King Bhumibol and Queen Sirikit of Thailand visited the U.S. Army's 27th Infantry "Wolfhounds" near Korat, Thailand in 1962. Here, Queen Sirikit visited with Colonel William A. Mckean, Commander of the 27th, and U.S. Ambassador to Thailand, Kenneth T. Young, Jr. The U.S. forces in Thailand are used to assist as instructors and advisors.

The regimes of Sarit and Thanom were strongly supported by the US. Thailand had formally become a US ally in 1954 with the formation of the Southeast Asia Treaty Organization (SEATO). While the war in Indochina was being fought between the Vietnamese and the French, Thailand (disliking both equally) stayed aloof, but once it became a war between the US and the Vietnamese communists, Thailand committed itself strongly to the US side, concluding a secret agreement with the US in 1961, sending troops to Vietnam and Laos, and allowing the US to use airbases in the east of the country to conduct its bombing war against North Vietnam. The Vietnamese retaliated by supporting the Communist Party of Thailand's insurgency in the north, northeast, and sometimes in the south, where guerrillas co-operated with local discontented Muslims. In the postwar period, Thailand had close relations with the US, which it saw as a protector from communist revolutions in neighboring countries. The Seventh and Thirteenth US Air Forces were headquartered at Udon Royal Thai Air Force Base.

=== Testing of Agent Orange ===
Agent Orange

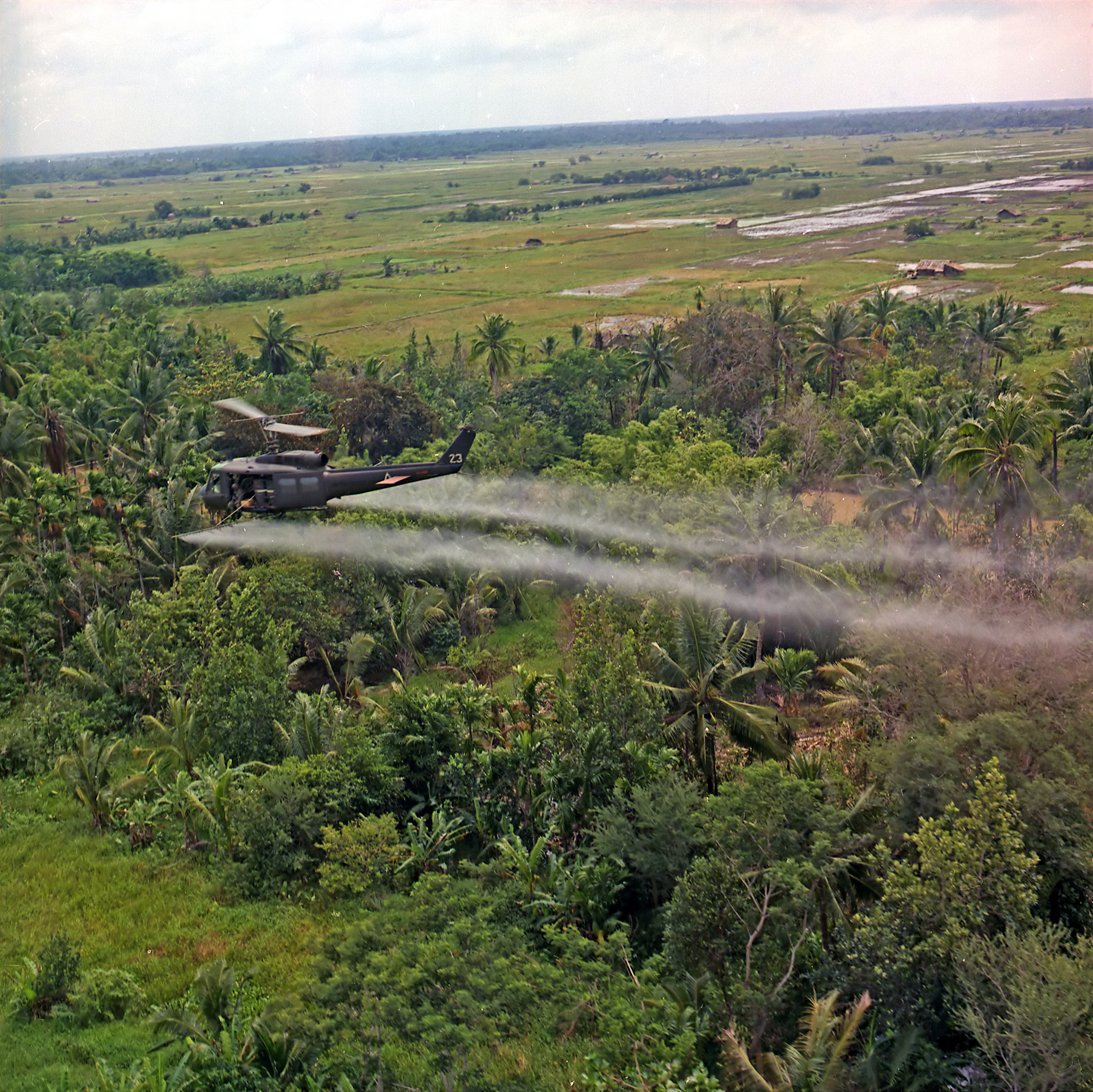
A UH-1D helicopter from the 336th Aviation Company sprays a defoliation agent on agricultural land in the Mekong Delta.

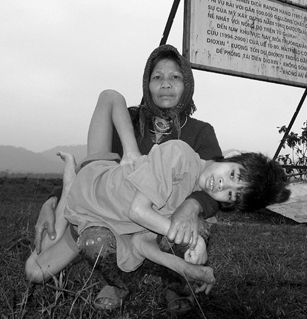
A 14-year-old Vietnamese person contaminated by Agent Orange.

Agent Orange is a herbicide and defoliant chemical used by the U.S. military as part of its herbicidal warfare program, Operation Ranch Hand. Agent Orange was tested by the United States in Thailand during the war in Southeast Asia. Buried drums were uncovered and confirmed to be Agent Orange in 1999. Workers who uncovered the drums fell ill while upgrading the airport near Hua Hin District, 100 km south of Bangkok.

A declassified Department of Defense report written in 1973, suggests that there was a significant use of herbicides on the fenced-in perimeters of military bases in Thailand to remove foliage that provided cover for enemy forces.

=== Development during the Vietnam War ===
Vietnam War-era American development in Thailand

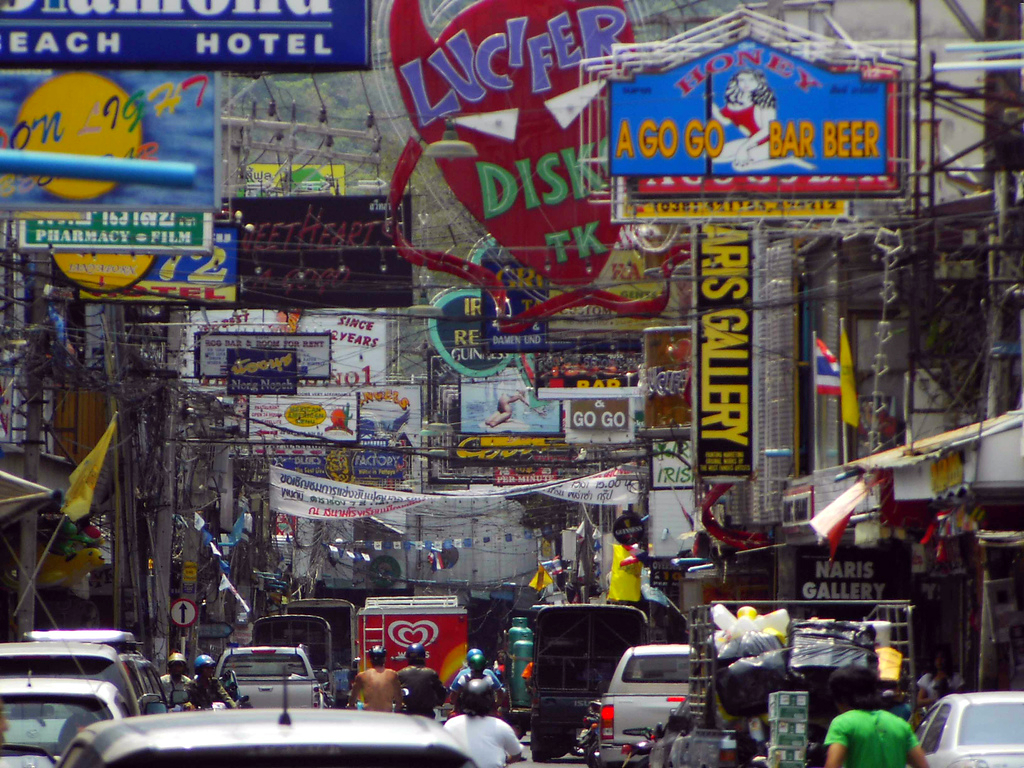
Walking Street, Pattaya

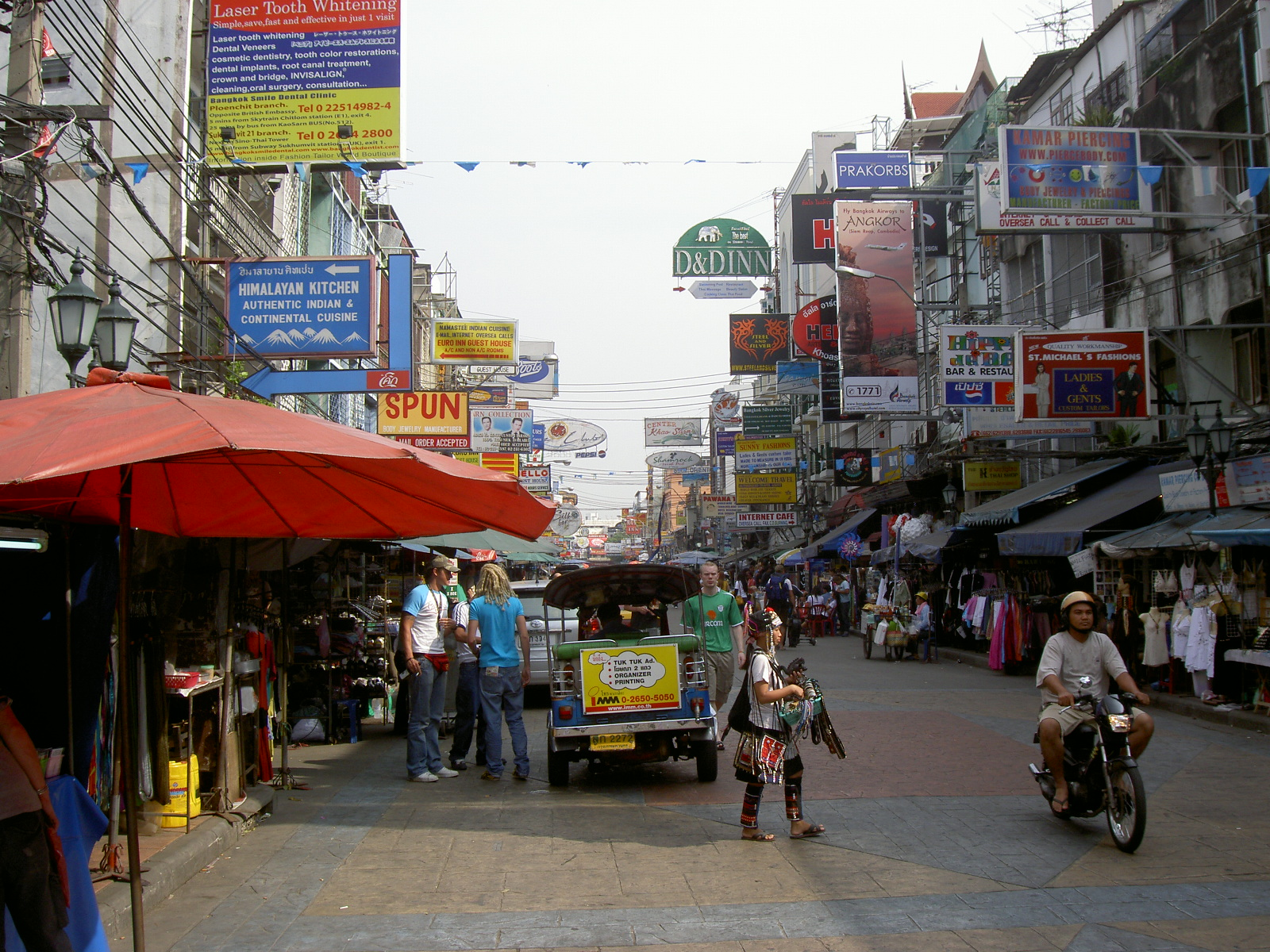
Khaosan Road, Bangkok

The Vietnam War hastened the modernisation and Westernisation of Thai society. The American presence and the exposure to Western culture that came with it had an effect on almost every aspect of Thai life. Before the late 1960s, full access to Western culture was limited to a highly educated elite in society, but the Vietnam War brought the outside world face to face with large segments of the Thai society as never before. With US dollars pumping up the economy, the service, transportation, and construction industries grew phenomenally as did drug abuse and prostitution. The traditional rural family unit was broken down as more and more rural Thais moved to the city to find new jobs. This led to a clash of cultures as Thais were exposed to Western ideas about fashion, music, values, and moral standards.

The population began to grow explosively as the standard of living rose, and a flood of people began to move from the villages to the cities, and above all to Bangkok. Thailand had 30 million people in 1965, while by the end of the 20th century the population had doubled. Bangkok's population had grown tenfold since 1945 and had tripled since 1970.

Educational opportunities and exposure to mass media increased during the Vietnam War years. Bright university students learned more about ideas related to Thailand's economic and political systems, resulting in a revival of student activism. The Vietnam War period also saw the growth of the Thai middle class which gradually developed its own identity and consciousness.

Economic development did not bring prosperity to all. During the 1960s many of the rural poor felt increasingly dissatisfied with their condition in society and disillusioned by their treatment by the central government in Bangkok. Efforts by the Thai government to develop poor rural regions often did not have the desired effect in that they contributed to the farmers' awareness of how bad off they really were. It was not always the poorest of the poor who joined the anti-government insurgency. Increased government presence in the rural villages did little to improve the situation. Villagers became subject to increased military and police harassment and bureaucratic corruption. Villagers often felt betrayed when government promises of development were frequently not fulfilled. By the early 1970s rural discontent had manifested itself into a peasant's activist movement.

=== Peasant's revolution ===
The peasant's movement got started in the regions just north of the central plains and the Chiang Mai area (not the areas where the insurgency was most active). When these regions had been organised into the centralised Siamese state in King Chulalongkorn's reign, the old local nobility had been allowed to grab large tracts of land. The end result was that by the 1960s close to 30% of the households were landless.

In the early 1970s university students helped to bring some of the local protests on to the national stage. The protests focused on land loss, high rents, the heavy-handed role of the police, corruption among the bureaucracy and the local elites, poor infrastructure, and overwhelming poverty. The government agreed to establish a committee to hear peasant grief. Within a short time the committee was flooded with more than 50,000 petitions, more than it could possibly handle. Officials called many of the peasants' demands unrealistic and too far-reaching.

=== Political environment ===
The political environment of Thailand changed little during the mid-1960s. Thanom and his chief deputy Praphas maintained a tight grip on power. The alliance between these two was further cemented by the marriage of Praphas's daughter to Thanom's son Narong. By the late 1960s, however, more elements in Thai society had become openly critical of the military government which was seen as being increasingly incapable of dealing with the country's problems. This was complemented by the fiscal deficit, inherited from the previous government and decline in foreign trade. It was not only the student activists, but also the business community that had begun to question the leadership of the government as well as its relationship with the United States.

Thanom came under increasing pressure to loosen his grip on power when the king commented that it was time for parliament to be restored and a new constitution put into effect. After Sarit had suspended the constitution in 1958, a committee was established to write a new one, but almost ten years later, it had still not been completed. Even so, the interim constitution served as a legal basis for Sarit to gain power. Sarit publicly announced that Western constitutional democracy should be put aside as the new constitution must serve the needs and conditions of the Thai people. Hence, the Constituent Assembly was filled with military appointees loyal to the Revolutionary Party, and power became more centralized in the executive branch. Even so, the new government was filled with notable ministers and only three military officers. Sarit made efforts to implement social and economic reforms by restructuring the National Economic Council and the Office of the Prime Minister, and establishing stringent measures for public sanitation. Finally, in 1968 the government issued a new constitution and scheduled elections for the following year. The government party founded by the military junta won the election and Thanom remained prime minister.

Surprisingly, the assembly was not totally tame. A number of MPs (mostly professionals such as doctors, lawyers, and journalists) began to openly challenge some of the government's policies, producing evidence of widespread government corruption on a number of large projects. As a new budget was being debated in 1971, it actually appeared that the military's demand for more funds might be voted down. Rather than suffer such a loss of face, Thanom carried out a putsch against his own government, suspended the constitution, and dissolved parliament. Once again Thailand had been returned to absolute military rule.

This strongman approach which had worked for Phibun in 1938 and 1947, and for Sarit in 1957–58, would prove to be unsuccessful. By the early 1970s Thai society as a whole had developed a level of political awareness which would no longer accept unjustified authoritarian rule. The king, using various holidays to give speeches on public issues, became openly critical of the Thanom-Praphas regime. He expressed doubt on the use of extreme violence in the efforts to combat insurgency. He mentioned the widespread existence of corruption in the government and expressed the view that coups should become a thing of the past in the Thai political system.

The junta began to face increasing opposition from within the military itself. Being preoccupied with their political roles, Thanom and Praphas had become more removed from direct control of the army. Many officers felt outraged by the rapid promotion of Narong and the fact that he seemed destined to be Thanom's successor. To these officers, it appeared that a political dynasty was being created.

=== 1973 democracy movement ===
The first fatality of the October 14 incident being winched atop the Democracy Monument, 1973.

Student demonstrations had started in 1968 and grew in size and numbers in the early 1970s despite the continued ban on political meetings. In June 1973, nine Ramkhamhaeng University students were expelled for publishing an article in a student newspaper that was critical of the government. Shortly after, thousands of students held a protest at the Democracy Monument demanding the re-enrolment of the nine students. The government ordered the universities to shut, but shortly afterwards allowed the students to be re-enrolled.

In October another 13 students were arrested on charges of conspiracy to overthrow the government. This time the student protesters were joined by workers, businessmen, and other ordinary citizens. The demonstrations swelled to several hundred thousand and the issue broadened from the release of the arrested students to demands for a new constitution and the replacement of the current government.

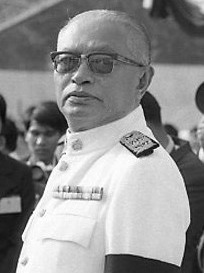
Sanya Dharmasakti, Prime Minister of Thailand, 1973–1975. Appointed by King Bhumibol following the 1973 Thai popular uprising.

On 13 October, the government released the detainees. Leaders of the demonstrations, among them Seksan Prasertkul, called off the march in accordance with the wishes of the king who was publicly against the democracy movement. In a speech to graduating students, he criticized the pro-democracy movement by telling students to concentrate on their studies and leave politics to their elders [military government].

As the crowds were breaking up the next day, on 14 October, many students found themselves unable to leave because the police had attempted to control the flow of the crowd by blocking the southern route to Rajavithi Road. Cornered and overwhelmed by the hostile crowd, the police responded with tear gas and gunfire.

The military was called in, and tanks rolled down Rajdamnoen Avenue and helicopters fired down at Thammasat University. A number of students commandeered buses and fire engines in an attempt to halt the progress of the tanks by ramming into them. With chaos on the streets, King Bhumibol opened the gates of Chitralada Palace to the students who were being gunned down by the army. Despite orders from Thanom that the military action be intensified, army commander Kris Sivara had the army withdrawn from the streets.

The king condemned the government's inability to handle the demonstrations and ordered Thanom, Praphas, and Narong to leave the country, and notably condemned the students' supposed role as well. At 18:10 Field Marshal Thanom Kittikachorn resigned from his post as prime minister. An hour later, the king appeared on national television, asking for calm, and announcing that Field Marshal Thanom Kittikachorn had been replaced with Dr. Sanya Dharmasakti, a respected law professor, as prime minister.

== See also ==
- History of Thailand (1973–2001)
- History of Thailand since 2001
- History of Thailand
- Military history of Thailand
- Constitutions of Thailand
