= I Miss You (1992 film) =

1992 Thai film

- Film poster
- Directed by: Bhandit Rittakol
- Screenplay by: Bhandit Rittakol
- Story by: Su Boonlieng; Udom Udomroj; Kriangkrai Amarttayakul
- Produced by: Saicharoon Iamphungporn
- Starring: Ann Thongprasom; Katreeya English; Saitharn Niyomkarn; Juckkrit Amarat
- Cinematography: Wanchai Leng-Eui
- Edited by: Poonsakdi Uthaiphant
- Music by: Dumrong Thampitak
- Distributed by: Five Star Production
- Release date: 11 April 1992
- Running time: 112 minutes
- Country: Thailand
- Language: Thai

Anueng Khitthueng Pho Sangkhep (Thai: อนึ่ง คิดถึงพอสังเขป), later released with the English title I Miss You, is a 1992 Thai coming-of-age film directed by Bhandit Rittakol and released by Five Star Production. The story follows a group of upper-secondary school students in Chiang Mai, and launched the careers of several of its actors, including Ann Thongprasom, Katreeya English, Saitharn Niyomkarn, members of the boy band Boyscout, and Juckkrit Amarat. The film was a commercial success and helped spark a wave of Thai teen films that followed in the 1990s. The film was shot at Yupparaj Wittayalai School.

I Miss You won several awards, including Best Picture at both the Suphannahong National Film Awards and Bangkok Critics Assembly Awards. It was registered as a national heritage film by the Thai Film Archive in its eighth annual listing, announced on 4 October 2018.
