= Chiang Mai Flower Festival =

Celebration in Thailand

Coordinates: 18.785026°N 98.978020°E

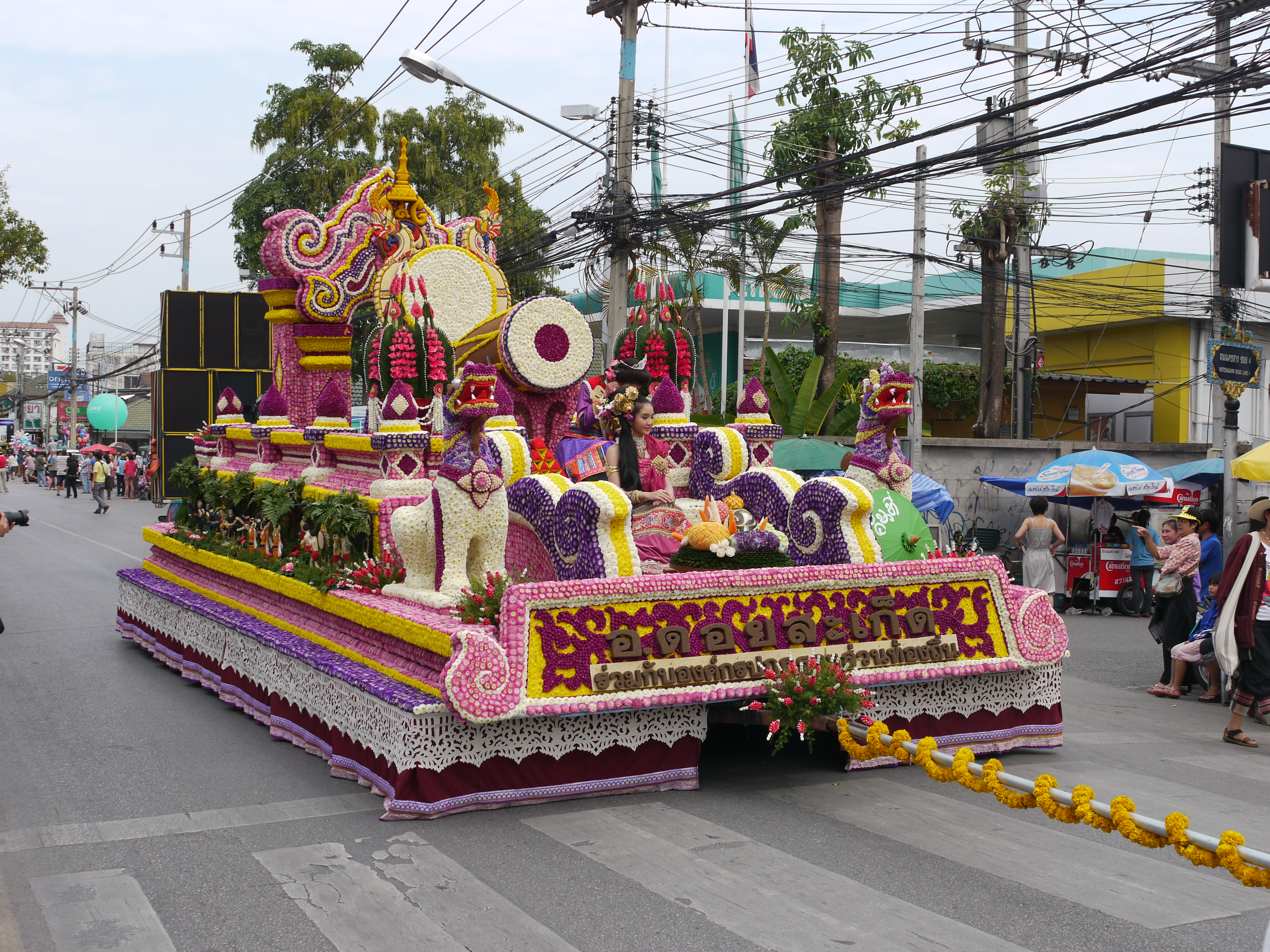
Chiang Mai Flower Festival in 2013

The Chiang Mai Flower Festival (Thai: มหกรรม ไม้ ดอกไม้ ประดับ จังหวัด เชียงใหม่) is an annual celebration held in Chiang Mai, Thailand, that showcases a variety of flowers and ornamental plants. The event marks the transition from the cool season, over three days on the first weekend of February. It features prominent displays of yellow and white chrysanthemums and damask roses, which are unique to the region.

== Flower Festival Parade ==
The Flower Festival Parade begins early Saturday morning and extending into the afternoon or evening. It originates along Charoen Muang Road, from Nawarat Bridge to the train station, and at 16:00, proceeds along Tha Phae Road towards Tha Phae Gate. From there, it turns left, following the city moat to Suan Buak Hat Park. The parade is known for its slow pace and frequent stops. Floats decorated with flowers are accompanied by western-style marching bands from local schools, local drumming groups, and dancers in traditional Thai costumes, who perform and distribute flowers to onlookers.

== Miss Chiang Mai Flower Festival ==
A part of the festival is the Miss Chiang Mai Flower Festival competition. Participants, often atop the decorated floats and carriages within the parade, compete for the title. The selection process begins in the late afternoon at a party featuring rock music and refreshments, culminating in the evening with the crowning of the Flower Festival Queen.
