= Santisuk Promsiri =

Thai actor

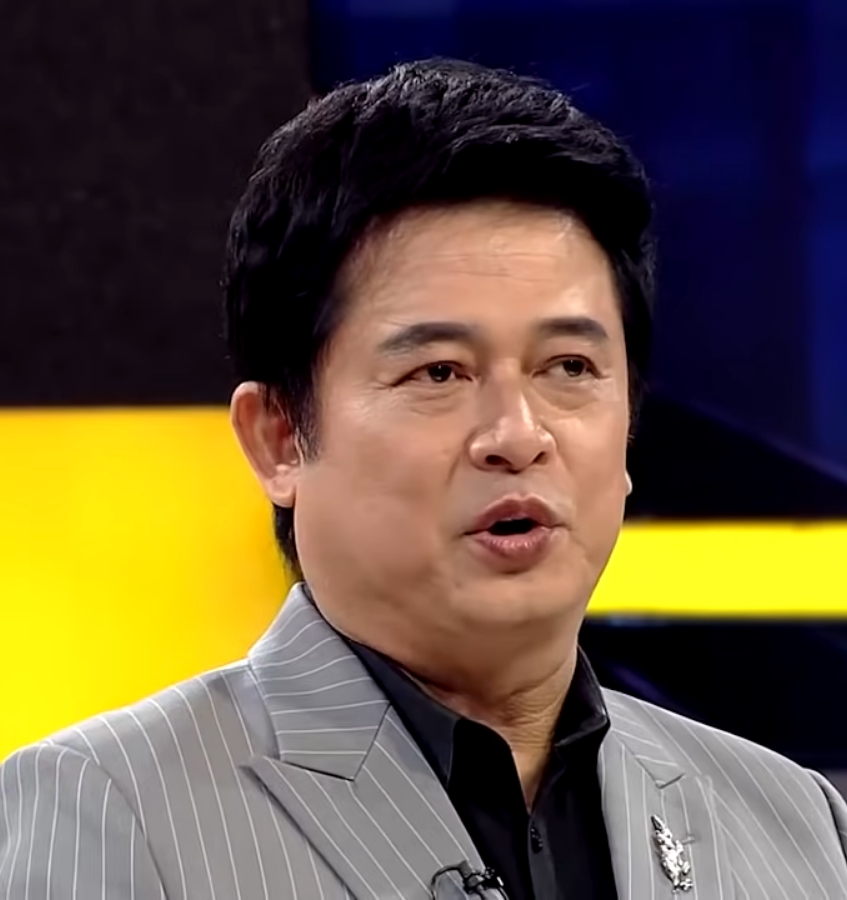
- Born: 6 August 1963 (age 62); Singburi province, Thailand
- Occupation: Actor

Santisuk Promsiri (Thai: สันติสุข พรหมศิริ; born 6 August 1963) is a Thai actor, who has also done work as a singer, voice actor, drama producer, drama director, and television host. He became widely known from the 1988 film Boonchu Phu Narak, which launched his acting career together with his female co-star Chintara Sukapatana, becoming one of the most popular on-screen couples in Thai cinema through the next decade.

Santisuk was born in Tha Chang district, Sing Buri province. He began acting during his third year at Ramkhamhaeng University, when a friend invited him to join the dramatic arts club. He then appeared on several television and stage plays, before making his first film appearance in Five Star Production's 1987 film Promise (Kham Man Sanya), starring opposite Jintara. They appeared together again in the following year's Boonchu, and went on to star together in Somsri #422R (1992) and Muen and Rid (1994), among numerous others including several Boonchu and Somsri sequels.

He has three sons. The youngest two are twins. The eldest son graduated in AI from CMKL University.
