= Jaran Manophet =

Thai musician (1951–2001)

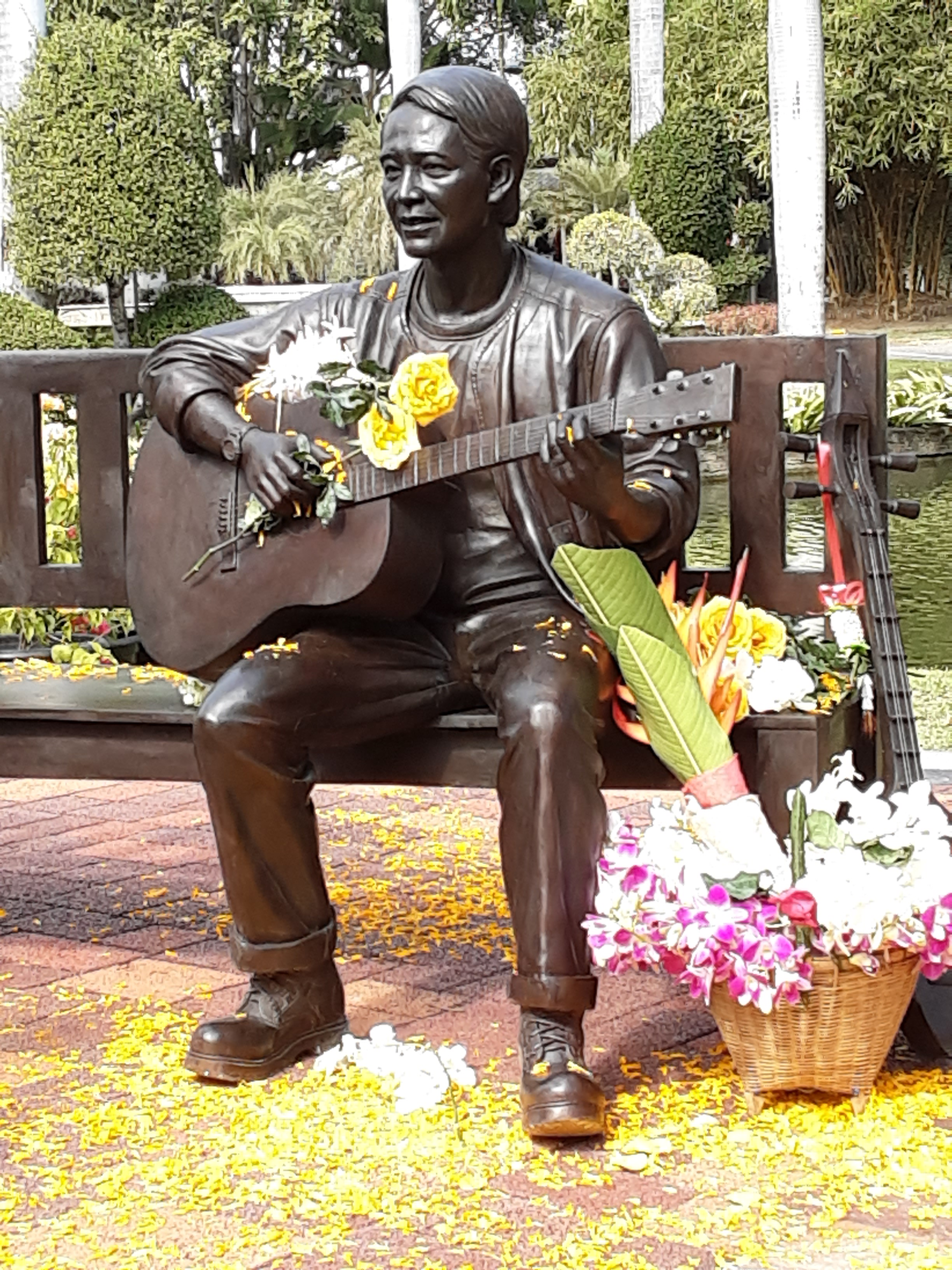
- Sculpture of Jaran Manophet in Buak Haad public park, Chiang Mai, Thailand
- Born: 1 January 1951; Chiang Mai, Thailand
- Died: 3 September 2001 (aged 50); Lamphun, Thailand
- Known for: Composing and performing songs
- Spouse: Anya Photiwat

Jaran Manophet (Thai: จรัล มโนเพ็ชร; 1 January 1951–3 September 2001) was a folk singer of Northern Thailand. Born in Chiang Mai city, he composed and performed around 300 songs, some in Lanna language and some in Central Thai. He is credited with being a pioneer in connecting traditional Lanna folksong with Western popular music styles that became widely appreciated in Thailand in the 1970s. His songs were stylistically simple but appealing; his lyrics brought local experiences of social and economic change into national circulation.

His songs are often described as Folk Songs Kammueang (folk music in the Northern Thai dialect). Among his most popular works are Mida, Khit Thueng Ban (Missing Home), Ban Bon Doi (House on the Mountain), and Rangwan Dae Khon Chang Fan (A Reward for Dreamers).

He died of heart disease on 3 September 2001 in Lamphun Province after experiencing dizziness and collapsing in a bathroom. He was 50 years old. He had been a heavy smoker and had lived with leukemia for more than 28 years, requiring blood transfusions every six months.

On 1 January 2022, a memorial sculpture to Jaran Manophet was inaugurated in Buak Hat Park, inside the old city wall of Chiang Mai and near to his birthplace.
