= Sriracha Tiger Zoo =

Former zoo in Chonburi, Thailand

Coordinates: 13°08′57″N 101°00′45″E

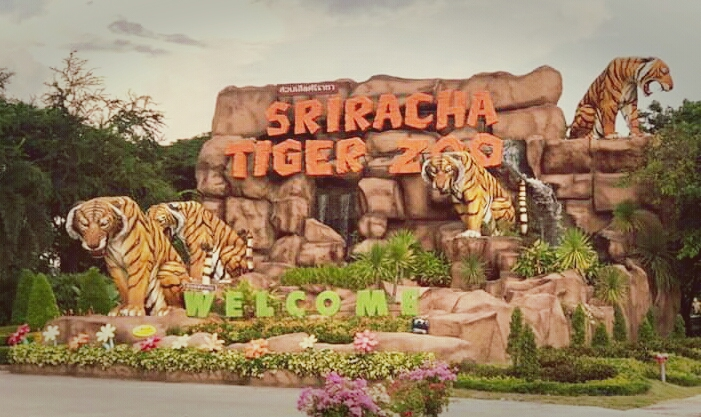
Entrance of Sri Racha Tiger Zoo

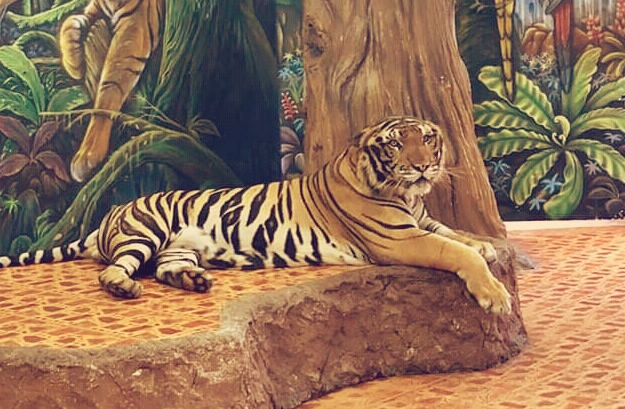
A tiger at Sri Racha Tiger Zoo

The Sriracha Tiger Zoo was a zoo in Sri Racha, a city on the outskirts of Pattaya, a seaside city in Chonburi Province, Thailand. It was about 110 km (68 mi) from Bangkok. The zoo claimed a large population of tigers and crocodiles.

Due to the Thai economy's collapse in 2021 as a result of the COVID-19 pandemic, Sriracha Tiger Zoo had to close its doors.

== Internet meme ==
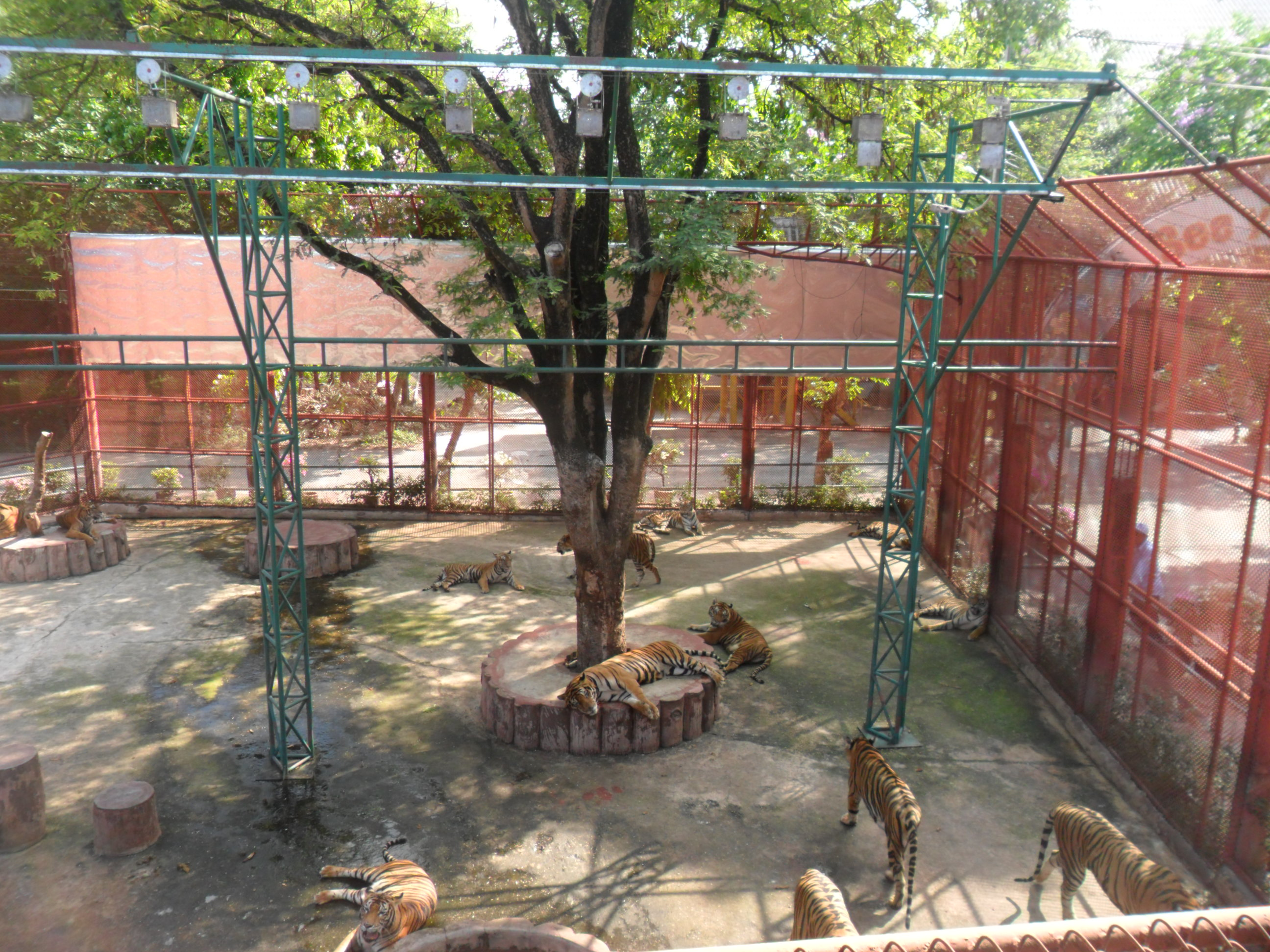
Shooting gallery

Photographs of a female tiger nursing piglets wrapped in tiger skin, accompanied by a fictitious story about a zoo in California, were actually taken at Sriracha.

== Controversy ==
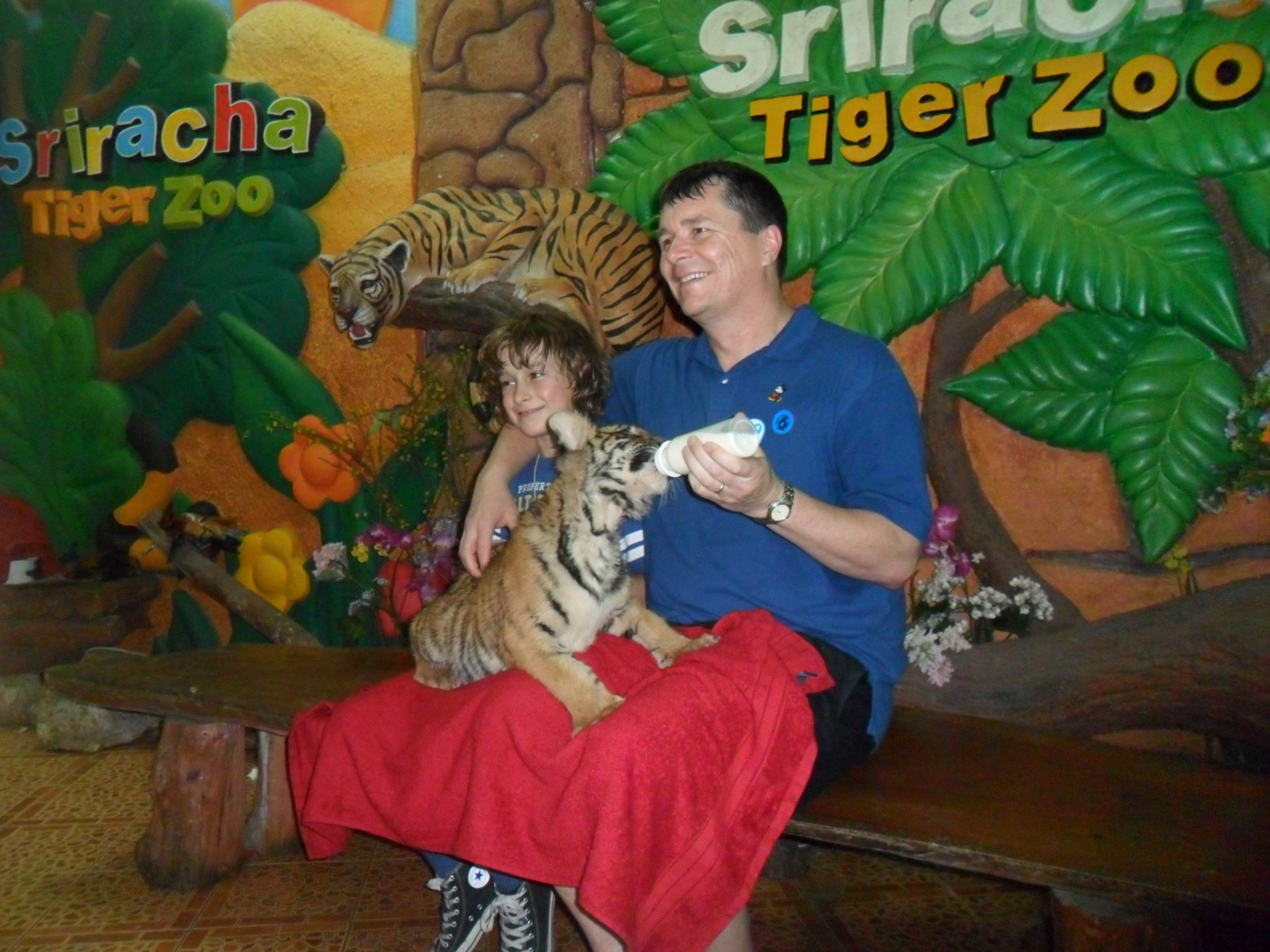
Feeding an adolescent tiger at the Sriracha Tiger Zoo

The Animal Welfare Institute reported in 2004 that the zoo had been using tigers and elephants in circus shows, including tigers leaping through rings of fire, walking across a double tightrope, parading around a ring on their hind legs, and riding on horseback. AWI reported "potentially dangerous human-tiger and human-elephant close interaction", "bizarre multi-species enclosures", tigers being struck with steel poles by trainers and implications that tigers were being bred for export to China.

World Animal Protection reported in 2016 that the tigers 'appeared in the poorest condition of all those observed in our research.'
