= Seksan Prasertkul =

Thai author (born 1949)

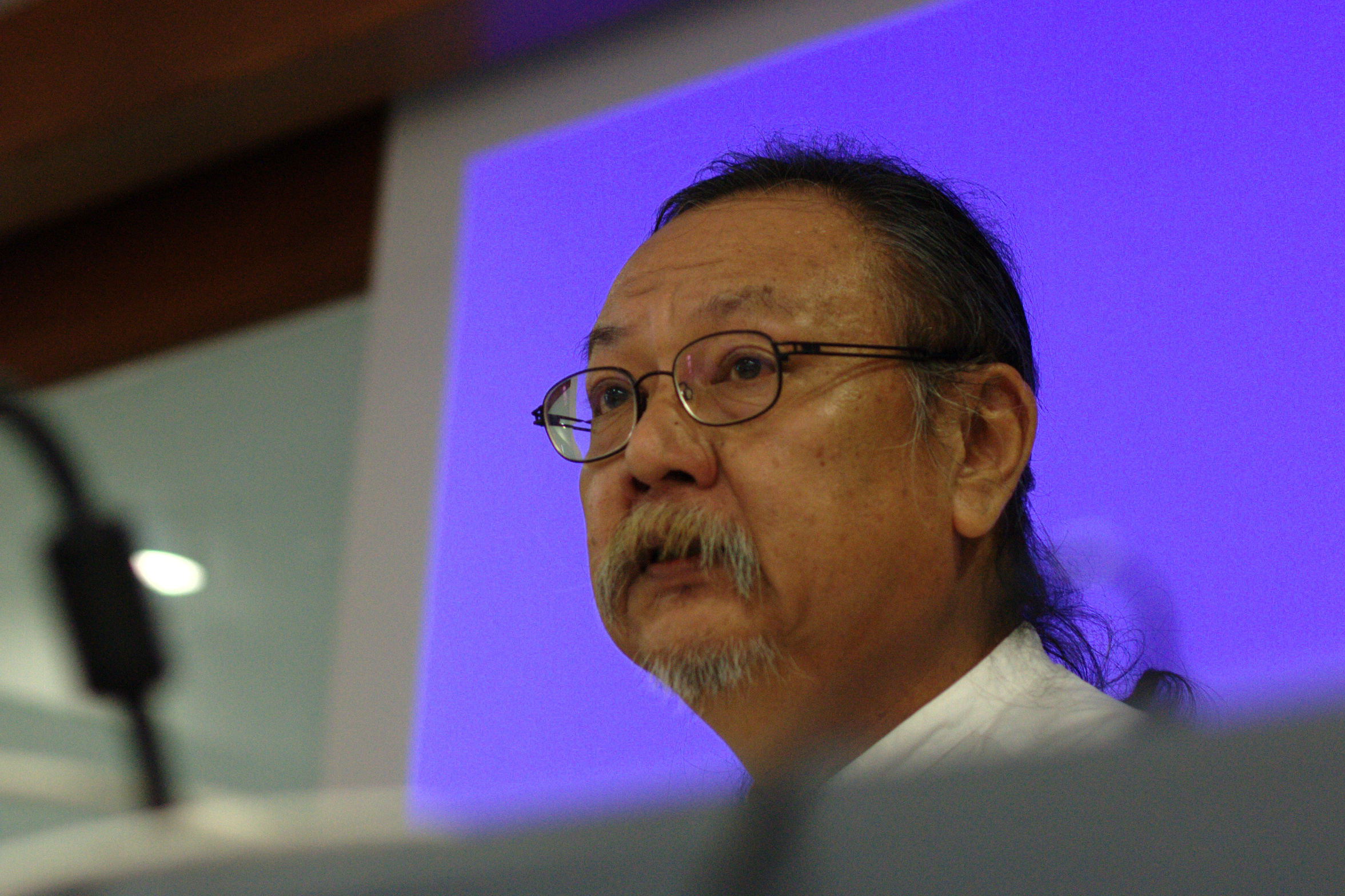
Seksan Prasertkul

Seksan Prasertkul (Thai: เสกสรรค์ ประเสริฐกุล, RTGS: Seksan Prasoetkun; born 1949) is a Thai author who was awarded the title National Artist of Thailand in 2009.

Seksan became a student leader at Thammasat University and was active in the October 1973 protests against the military government of Thanom Kittikachorn.

Seksan is the author of poetry, stories, and an autobiography, which was adapted into a 2001 movie titled The Moonhunter.

== Early life ==
Seksan is the son of a fishing-boat builder and a market vendor. He graduated from high school at Chonkanyanakul School in Chonburi province, and received an AFS scholarship. He was an exchange student at a high school in the United States in 1967 and 1968. On his return to Thailand, he gained admission to Thammasat University by virtue of his high scores on the nationwide university entrance exam.

== Leading up to 14 October 1973 ==
Sulak Sivaraksa "initiated forums for students to discuss current social issues. Among those attending was Seksan", according to Historical Dictionary of Thailand.

== After the Thammasat University Massacre ==
After the 6 October 1976 Thammasat University Massacre, he took refuge with the communist insurgents in northeastern Thailand. In 1980, the Thai government offered amnesty to those who defected from insurgent movements. Prasertkul would surrender and return home six months after the amnesty began. Upon leaving the insurgency, he referred to himself as "a historical ruin." He went to the United States for graduate studies and received a doctorate from Cornell University in 1989. He has since taught political science at Thammasat University, where he is a well known and respected figure.

== Works ==
- Ruedukan ("seasons"—short stories)
- "bamboo flowers"
- "coming from the mangrove forest"
- Manutsayatham Kap Kan Tosu Thang Chon Chan
- "Song of the Water, Dance of the Clouds"
- Life University
- Hiking in the Wood in Search of Real Life
- Wandering in Search of Fish
- "Life and Writing Books"
- "Stream and Crosswalk"
- "Song of the Universe"
- "Waves of Liberty"
- "Song of the Universe"
- "Stream and Crosswalk"
- "Moment of Defeat"
- "Man and Tiger" (short stories)
- "Bubbles of Time" (short stories)
- Khon la chan: 14 Tula songkhram prachachon ("14 October, the people's war")
- Bangyang thi haipai: Ruam botkhwam kieokap satpa læ thammachat
- Khlun seriphap: Riang khwam 7 huakho
- Phleng ekkaphop: Banthuk khon doenthang
- Phleng nam rabam mek
- Rudukan: Ruang san læ botkawi (Chut "ruang san Thai")

=== Works translated to English ===
- "A bamboo bridge over rapids" (translated by Marcel Barang)

== Private ==
He married Chiranan Pitpreecha. She won a SEA Write Award in 1989. The couple has since separated.
