= List of prime ministers of Thailand =

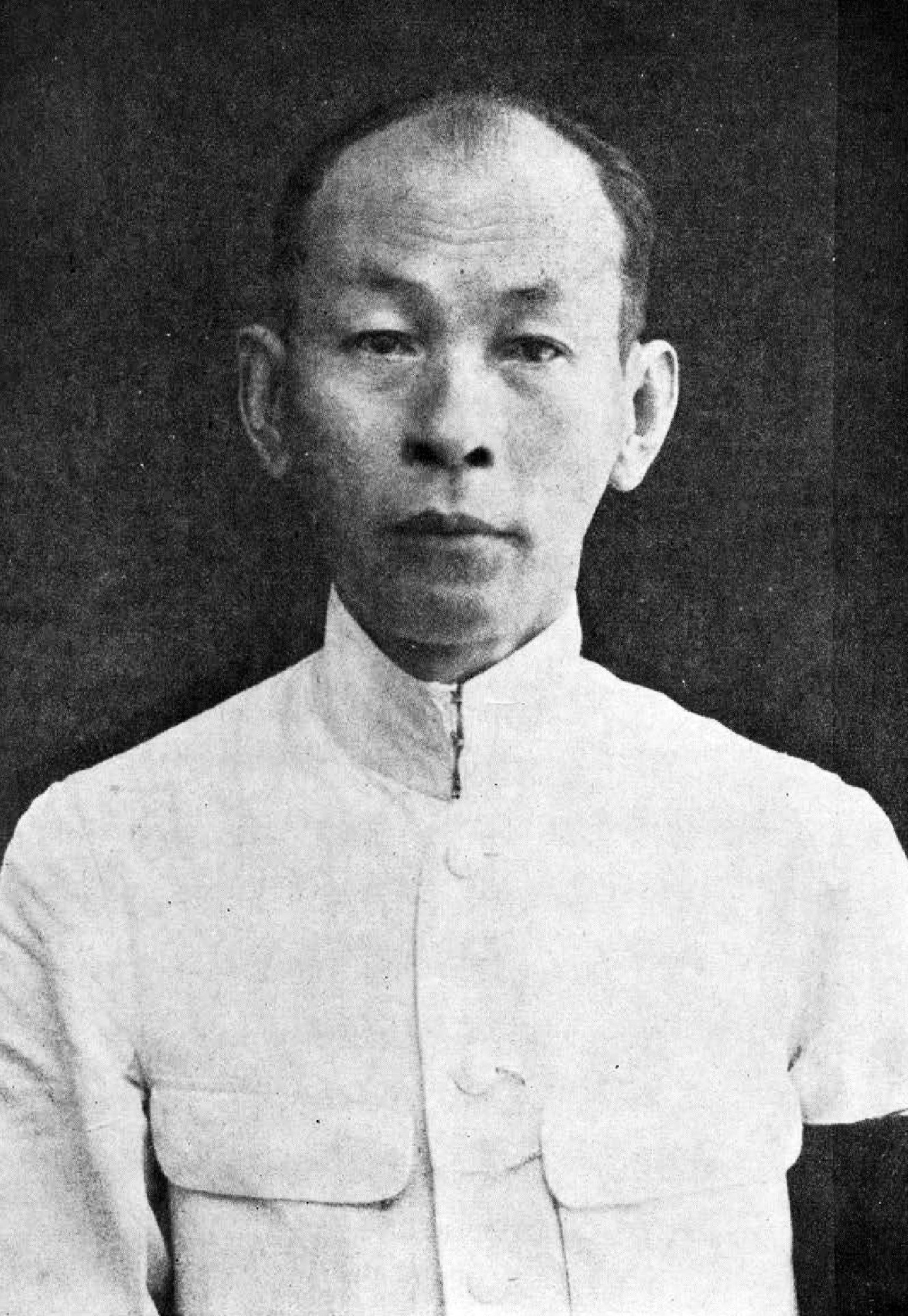
Manopakorn Nitithada was the first prime minister.

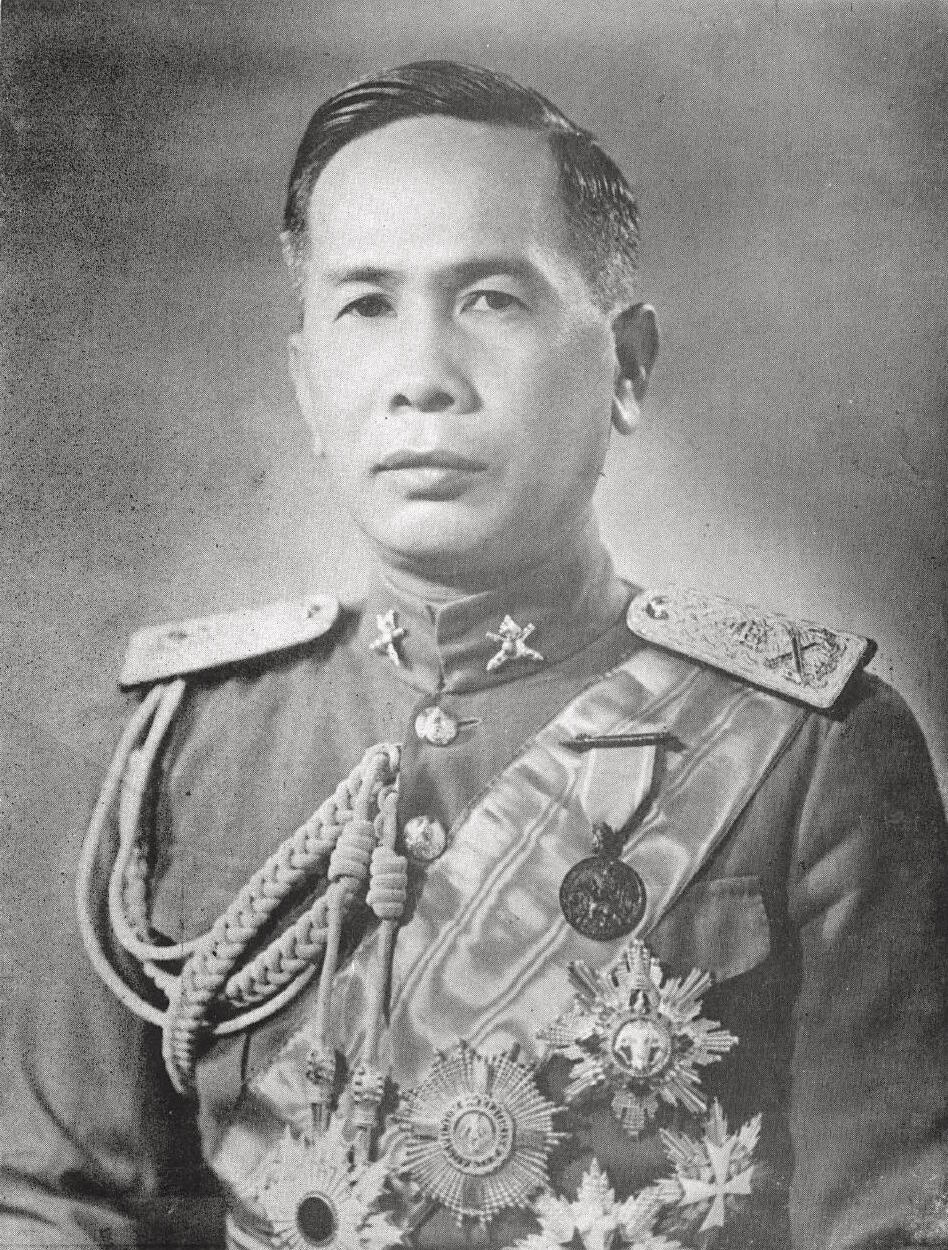
Plaek Phibunsongkhram was the longest-serving prime minister.

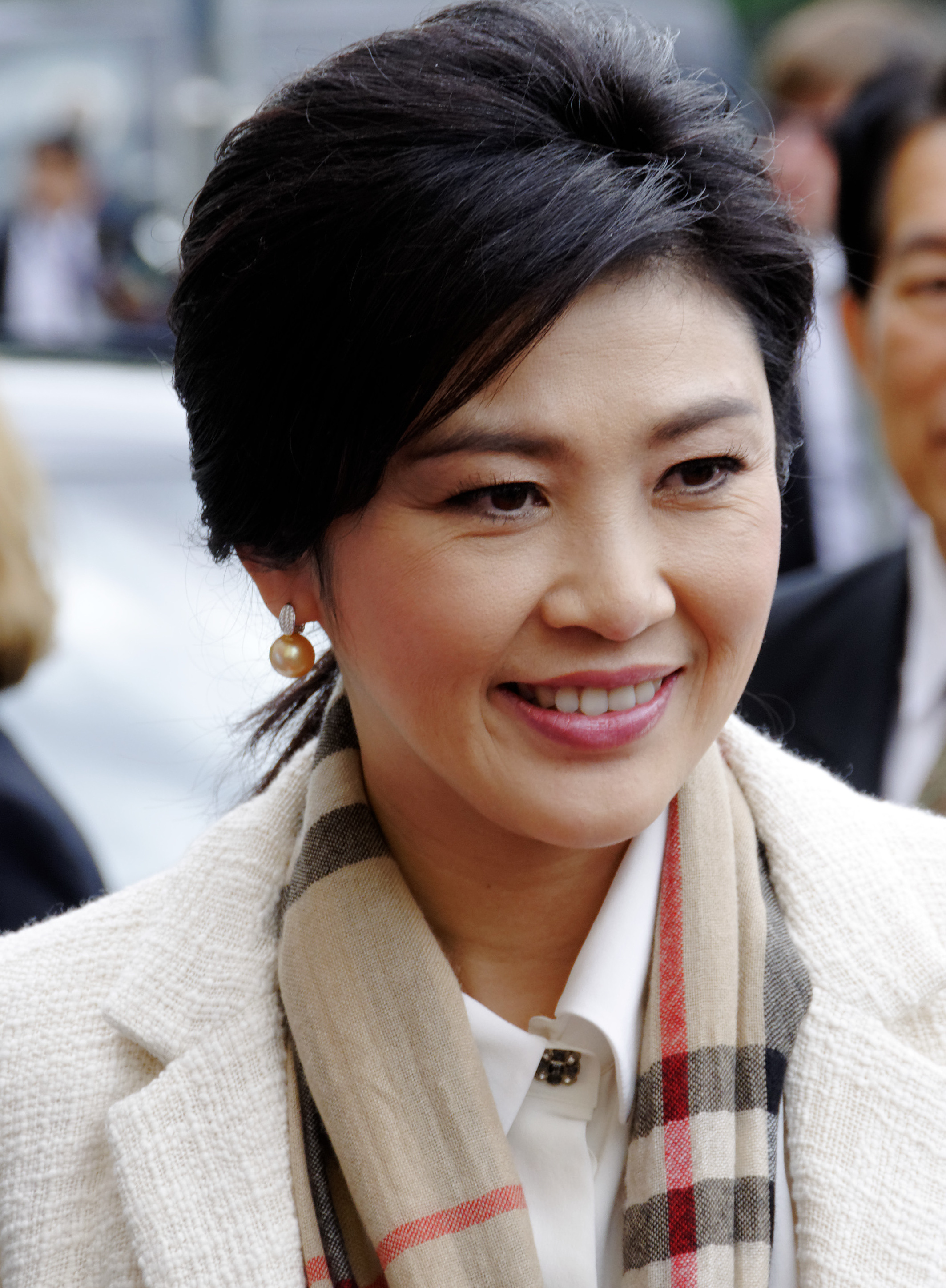
Yingluck Shinawatra was the first female prime minister.

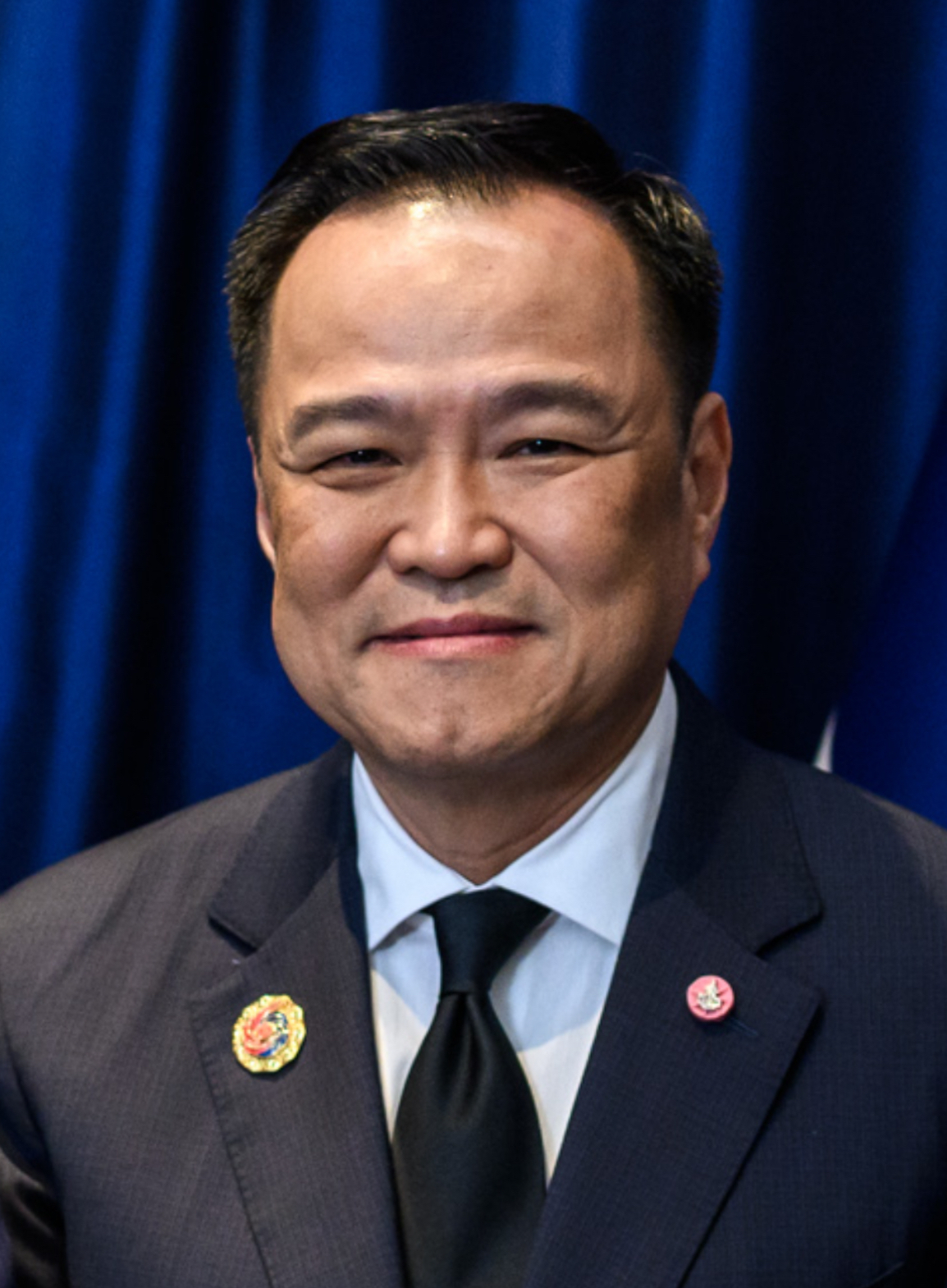
Anutin Charnvirakul is the current prime minister.

The prime minister of Thailand (Thai: นายกรัฐมนตรี; RTGS: Nayok Ratthamontri; IPA: [naː.jók rát.tʰà.mon.triː], literally 'chief minister of state') is the head of government of Thailand. The prime minister is also the chair of the cabinet of Thailand and represents the Royal Thai Government at home and the country abroad.

The post of prime minister had existed in some forms throughout the history of Thailand, the most known form was the Samuhanayok post. This position emerged during the Ayutthaya Kingdom as part of the centralization of government.

The modern post of prime minister has existed since the Siamese revolution of 1932 and Siam's first constitution. Throughout the post's existence, it has mostly been occupied by military leaders from the Royal Thai Army, three holding the rank of field marshal and seven the rank of general.

The current prime minister is Anutin Charnvirakul, leader of the Bhumjaithai Party, who assumed the office on 7 September 2025.

Note: This list includes leaders of military juntas and acting prime ministers. However, they are not counted in the official list as provided by the Royal Thai Government.

== List of prime ministers ==
Colour key (for political coalitions/parties):

General categories:

Independent (12)
Military (9)

Defunct political parties:

Pre–1950:
Khana Ratsadon (4)
Free Thai (1)
Sahachip (1)
Constitutional Front (1)

1950–1975:
Conservative (1)
Seri Manangkhasila (1)
National Socialist (1)
United Thai People's (1)

Post–2000:
Social Action (1)
Thai Nation (2)
Thai Rak Thai (1)
People's Power (2)

Active political parties:

Democrat (4)
New Aspiration (1)
Pheu Thai (5)
Palang Pracharath (1)
United Thai Nation (1)
Bhumjaithai (1)

No.	Portrait	Prime minister (Lifespan)	Term of office			Mandate	Party	Government	Monarch Reign
No.	Portrait	Prime minister (Lifespan)	Start	End	Duration	Mandate	Party	Government	Monarch Reign
1		Phraya; Manopakorn Nitithada (Note: Phraya Manopakorn Nitithada was the President of the People's Committee until 10 December 1932.) มโนปกรณ์นิติธาดา (1884–1948)	28 June 1932	20 June 1933	357 days	—	Independent	Manopakorn I	Prajadhipok r. 1925–1935 (Rama VII)
1		Phraya; Manopakorn Nitithada มโนปกรณ์นิติธาดา (1884–1948)	28 June 1932	20 June 1933	357 days	—	Independent	Manopakorn II	Prajadhipok r. 1925–1935 (Rama VII)
1		Phraya; Manopakorn Nitithada มโนปกรณ์นิติธาดา (1884–1948)	28 June 1932	20 June 1933	357 days	—	Independent	Manopakorn III	Prajadhipok r. 1925–1935 (Rama VII)
2		Phraya; Phahon Phonphayuhasena พหลพลพยุหเสนา (1887–1947)	21 June 1933	16 December 1938	5 years, 178 days	—	Khana Ratsadon	Phahon I	Prajadhipok r. 1925–1935 (Rama VII)
2		Phraya; Phahon Phonphayuhasena พหลพลพยุหเสนา (1887–1947)	21 June 1933	16 December 1938	5 years, 178 days	1933	Khana Ratsadon	Phahon II	Prajadhipok r. 1925–1935 (Rama VII)
2		Phraya; Phahon Phonphayuhasena พหลพลพยุหเสนา (1887–1947)	21 June 1933	16 December 1938	5 years, 178 days	—	Khana Ratsadon	Phahon III	Prajadhipok r. 1925–1935 (Rama VII)
2		Phraya; Phahon Phonphayuhasena พหลพลพยุหเสนา (1887–1947)	21 June 1933	16 December 1938	5 years, 178 days	—	Khana Ratsadon	Phahon III	Ananda Mahidol r. 1935–1946 (Rama VIII)
2		Phraya; Phahon Phonphayuhasena พหลพลพยุหเสนา (1887–1947)	21 June 1933	16 December 1938	5 years, 178 days	1937	Khana Ratsadon	Phahon IV	Ananda Mahidol r. 1935–1946 (Rama VIII)
2		Phraya; Phahon Phonphayuhasena พหลพลพยุหเสนา (1887–1947)	21 June 1933	16 December 1938	5 years, 178 days	—	Khana Ratsadon	Phahon V	Ananda Mahidol r. 1935–1946 (Rama VIII)
3		Plaek Phibunsongkhram แปลก พิบูลสงคราม (1897–1964)	16 December 1938	1 August 1944	5 years, 229 days	1938	Khana Ratsadon	Plaek I	Ananda Mahidol r. 1935–1946 (Rama VIII)
3		Plaek Phibunsongkhram แปลก พิบูลสงคราม (1897–1964)	16 December 1938	1 August 1944	5 years, 229 days	—	Khana Ratsadon	Plaek II	Ananda Mahidol r. 1935–1946 (Rama VIII)
4		Khuang Aphaiwong ควง อภัยวงศ์ (1902–1968)	1 August 1944	31 August 1945	1 year, 30 days	—	Khana Ratsadon	Khuang I	Ananda Mahidol r. 1935–1946 (Rama VIII)
5		Thawi Bunyaket ทวี บุณยเกตุ (1904–1971)	31 August 1945	17 September 1945	17 days	—	Khana Ratsadon	Thawi	Ananda Mahidol r. 1935–1946 (Rama VIII)
6		Mom Rajawongse; Seni Pramoj เสนีย์ ปราโมช (1905–1997)	17 September 1945	31 January 1946	136 days	—	Free Thai	Seni I	Ananda Mahidol r. 1935–1946 (Rama VIII)
(4)		Khuang Aphaiwong ควง อภัยวงศ์ (1902–1968)	31 January 1946	24 March 1946	52 days	Jan. 1946	Khana Ratsadon	Khuang II	Ananda Mahidol r. 1935–1946 (Rama VIII)
7		Pridi Banomyong ปรีดี พนมยงค์ (1900–1983)	24 March 1946	23 August 1946	152 days	—	Sahachip	Pridi I	Ananda Mahidol r. 1935–1946 (Rama VIII)
7		Pridi Banomyong ปรีดี พนมยงค์ (1900–1983)	24 March 1946	23 August 1946	152 days	—	Sahachip	Pridi I	Bhumibol Adulyadej r. 1946–2016 (Rama IX)
7		Pridi Banomyong ปรีดี พนมยงค์ (1900–1983)	24 March 1946	23 August 1946	152 days	—	Sahachip	Pridi II	Bhumibol Adulyadej r. 1946–2016 (Rama IX)
8		Thawan Thamrongnawasawat ถวัลย์ ธำรงนาวาสวัสดิ์ (1901–1988)	23 August 1946	8 November 1947	1 year, 79 days	Aug. 1946 (Note: Supplementary election.)	Constitutional Front	Thawan I	Bhumibol Adulyadej r. 1946–2016 (Rama IX)
8		Thawan Thamrongnawasawat ถวัลย์ ธำรงนาวาสวัสดิ์ (1901–1988)	23 August 1946	8 November 1947	1 year, 79 days	—	Constitutional Front	Thawan II	Bhumibol Adulyadej r. 1946–2016 (Rama IX)
—		Phin Choonhavan ผิน ชุณหะวัณ (1891–1973); Head of the National Military Council	8 November 1947	10 November 1947	2 days	—	Military	National Military Council	Bhumibol Adulyadej r. 1946–2016 (Rama IX)
(4)		Khuang Aphaiwong ควง อภัยวงศ์ (1902–1968)	10 November 1947	8 April 1948	150 days	—	Democrat	Khuang III	Bhumibol Adulyadej r. 1946–2016 (Rama IX)
(4)		Khuang Aphaiwong ควง อภัยวงศ์ (1902–1968)	10 November 1947	8 April 1948	150 days	1948	Democrat	Khuang IV	Bhumibol Adulyadej r. 1946–2016 (Rama IX)
(3)		Plaek Phibunsongkhram แปลก พิบูลสงคราม (1897–1964)	8 April 1948	16 September 1957	9 years, 161 days	—	Conservative (until 1955)	Plaek III	Bhumibol Adulyadej r. 1946–2016 (Rama IX)
(3)		Plaek Phibunsongkhram แปลก พิบูลสงคราม (1897–1964)	8 April 1948	16 September 1957	9 years, 161 days	1949	Conservative (until 1955)	Plaek IV	Bhumibol Adulyadej r. 1946–2016 (Rama IX)
(3)		Plaek Phibunsongkhram แปลก พิบูลสงคราม (1897–1964)	8 April 1948	16 September 1957	9 years, 161 days	—	Conservative (until 1955)	Plaek V	Bhumibol Adulyadej r. 1946–2016 (Rama IX)
(3)		Plaek Phibunsongkhram แปลก พิบูลสงคราม (1897–1964)	8 April 1948	16 September 1957	9 years, 161 days	—	Conservative (until 1955)	Plaek VI	Bhumibol Adulyadej r. 1946–2016 (Rama IX)
(3)		Plaek Phibunsongkhram แปลก พิบูลสงคราม (1897–1964)	8 April 1948	16 September 1957	9 years, 161 days	1952	Conservative (until 1955)	Plaek VII	Bhumibol Adulyadej r. 1946–2016 (Rama IX)
(3)		Plaek Phibunsongkhram แปลก พิบูลสงคราม (1897–1964)	8 April 1948	16 September 1957	9 years, 161 days	1952	Seri Manangkhasila (from 1955)	Plaek VII	Bhumibol Adulyadej r. 1946–2016 (Rama IX)
(3)		Plaek Phibunsongkhram แปลก พิบูลสงคราม (1897–1964)	8 April 1948	16 September 1957	9 years, 161 days	Feb. 1957	Seri Manangkhasila (from 1955)	Plaek VIII	Bhumibol Adulyadej r. 1946–2016 (Rama IX)
—		Sarit Thanarat สฤษดิ์ ธนะรัชต์ (1908–1963); Head of the Revolutionary Council	16 September 1957	21 September 1957	5 days	—	Military	Revolutionary Council	Bhumibol Adulyadej r. 1946–2016 (Rama IX)
9		Pote Sarasin พจน์ สารสิน (1905–2000)	21 September 1957	1 January 1958	102 days	—	Independent	Pote	Bhumibol Adulyadej r. 1946–2016 (Rama IX)
10		Thanom Kittikachorn ถนอม กิตติขจร (1911–2004)	1 January 1958	20 October 1958	292 days	Dec. 1957	National Socialist	Thanom I	Bhumibol Adulyadej r. 1946–2016 (Rama IX)
—		Sarit Thanarat (Note: Sarit Thanarat was the Head of the Revolutionary Council until 9 February 1959.) สฤษดิ์ ธนะรัชต์ (1908–1963)	20 October 1958	9 February 1959	112 days	—	Military	Revolutionary Council	Bhumibol Adulyadej r. 1946–2016 (Rama IX)
11		Sarit Thanarat สฤษดิ์ ธนะรัชต์ (1908–1963)	9 February 1959	8 December 1963 #	4 years, 302 days	—	Military	Sarit	Bhumibol Adulyadej r. 1946–2016 (Rama IX)
(10)		Thanom Kittikachorn (Note: Thanom Kittikachorn was the Chairman of the National Executive Council (Head of the Revolutionary Council to 9 December 1971) from 17 November 1971 until 18 December 1972.) ถนอม กิตติขจร (1911–2004)	9 December 1963	17 November 1971	7 years, 343 days	—	Military (until 1968)	Thanom II	Bhumibol Adulyadej r. 1946–2016 (Rama IX)
(10)		Thanom Kittikachorn ถนอม กิตติขจร (1911–2004)	9 December 1963	17 November 1971	7 years, 343 days	—	United Thai People's (1968–1971)	Thanom II	Bhumibol Adulyadej r. 1946–2016 (Rama IX)
(10)		Thanom Kittikachorn ถนอม กิตติขจร (1911–2004)	9 December 1963	17 November 1971	7 years, 343 days	1969	United Thai People's (1968–1971)	Thanom III	Bhumibol Adulyadej r. 1946–2016 (Rama IX)
—		Thanom Kittikachorn ถนอม กิตติขจร (1911–2004)	17 November 1971	18 December 1972	1 year, 31 days	—	Military (from 1971)	National Executive Council	Bhumibol Adulyadej r. 1946–2016 (Rama IX)
(10)		Thanom Kittikachorn ถนอม กิตติขจร (1911–2004)	18 December 1972	14 October 1973	300 days	—	Military (from 1971)	Thanom IV	Bhumibol Adulyadej r. 1946–2016 (Rama IX)
12		Sanya Dharmasakti สัญญา ธรรมศักดิ์ (1907–2002)	14 October 1973	15 February 1975	1 year, 124 days	—	Independent	Sanya I	Bhumibol Adulyadej r. 1946–2016 (Rama IX)
12		Sanya Dharmasakti สัญญา ธรรมศักดิ์ (1907–2002)	14 October 1973	15 February 1975	1 year, 124 days	—	Independent	Sanya II	Bhumibol Adulyadej r. 1946–2016 (Rama IX)
(6)		Mom Rajawongse; Seni Pramoj เสนีย์ ปราโมช (1905–1997)	15 February 1975	14 March 1975	27 days	1975	Democrat	Seni II	Bhumibol Adulyadej r. 1946–2016 (Rama IX)
13		Mom Rajawongse; Kukrit Pramoj คึกฤทธิ์ ปราโมช (1911–1995)	14 March 1975	20 April 1976	1 year, 37 days	—	Social Action	Kukrit	Bhumibol Adulyadej r. 1946–2016 (Rama IX)
(6)		Mom Rajawongse; Seni Pramoj เสนีย์ ปราโมช (1905–1997)	20 April 1976	6 October 1976	169 days	1976	Democrat	Seni III	Bhumibol Adulyadej r. 1946–2016 (Rama IX)
(6)		Mom Rajawongse; Seni Pramoj เสนีย์ ปราโมช (1905–1997)	20 April 1976	6 October 1976	169 days	—	Democrat	Seni IV	Bhumibol Adulyadej r. 1946–2016 (Rama IX)
—		Sangad Chaloryu สงัด ชลออยู่ (1915–1980); Head of the National Administrative Reform Council	6 October 1976	8 October 1976	2 days	—	Military	National Administrative Reform Council	Bhumibol Adulyadej r. 1946–2016 (Rama IX)
14		Thanin Kraivichien ธานินทร์ กรัยวิเชียร (1927–2025)	8 October 1976	20 October 1977	1 year, 12 days	—	Independent	Thanin	Bhumibol Adulyadej r. 1946–2016 (Rama IX)
—		Sangad Chaloryu สงัด ชลออยู่ (1915–1980); Head of the Revolutionary Council	20 October 1977	11 November 1977	22 days	—	Military	Revolutionary Council	Bhumibol Adulyadej r. 1946–2016 (Rama IX)
15		Kriangsak Chamanan เกรียงศักดิ์ ชมะนันท์ (1917–2003)	11 November 1977	3 March 1980	2 years, 113 days	—	Military (until 1978)	Kriangsak I	Bhumibol Adulyadej r. 1946–2016 (Rama IX)
15		Kriangsak Chamanan เกรียงศักดิ์ ชมะนันท์ (1917–2003)	11 November 1977	3 March 1980	2 years, 113 days	—	Independent (from 1978)	Kriangsak I	Bhumibol Adulyadej r. 1946–2016 (Rama IX)
15		Kriangsak Chamanan เกรียงศักดิ์ ชมะนันท์ (1917–2003)	11 November 1977	3 March 1980	2 years, 113 days	1979	Independent (from 1978)	Kriangsak II	Bhumibol Adulyadej r. 1946–2016 (Rama IX)
16		Prem Tinsulanonda เปรม ติณสูลานนท์ (1920–2019)	3 March 1980	4 August 1988	8 years, 154 days	—	Military (until 1981)	Prem I	Bhumibol Adulyadej r. 1946–2016 (Rama IX)
16		Prem Tinsulanonda เปรม ติณสูลานนท์ (1920–2019)	3 March 1980	4 August 1988	8 years, 154 days	—	Independent (from 1981)	Prem I	Bhumibol Adulyadej r. 1946–2016 (Rama IX)
16		Prem Tinsulanonda เปรม ติณสูลานนท์ (1920–2019)	3 March 1980	4 August 1988	8 years, 154 days	1983	Independent (from 1981)	Prem II	Bhumibol Adulyadej r. 1946–2016 (Rama IX)
16		Prem Tinsulanonda เปรม ติณสูลานนท์ (1920–2019)	3 March 1980	4 August 1988	8 years, 154 days	1986	Independent (from 1981)	Prem III	Bhumibol Adulyadej r. 1946–2016 (Rama IX)
17		Chatichai Choonhavan ชาติชาย ชุณหะวัณ (1920–1998)	4 August 1988	23 February 1991	2 years, 203 days	1988	Thai Nation	Chatichai I	Bhumibol Adulyadej r. 1946–2016 (Rama IX)
17		Chatichai Choonhavan ชาติชาย ชุณหะวัณ (1920–1998)	4 August 1988	23 February 1991	2 years, 203 days	—	Thai Nation	Chatichai II	Bhumibol Adulyadej r. 1946–2016 (Rama IX)
—		Sunthorn Kongsompong สุนทร คงสมพงษ์ (1931–1999); Head of the National Peace Keeping Council	23 February 1991	2 March 1991	7 days	—	Military	National Peace Keeping Council	Bhumibol Adulyadej r. 1946–2016 (Rama IX)
18		Anand Panyarachun อานันท์ ปันยารชุน (born 1932)	2 March 1991	7 April 1992	1 year, 36 days	—	Independent	Anand I	Bhumibol Adulyadej r. 1946–2016 (Rama IX)
19		Suchinda Kraprayoon สุจินดา คราประยูร (1933–2025)	7 April 1992	24 May 1992	47 days	Mar. 1992	Independent	Suchinda	Bhumibol Adulyadej r. 1946–2016 (Rama IX)
—		Meechai Ruchuphan มีชัย ฤชุพันธุ์ (born 1938); Acting Prime Minister	24 May 1992	10 June 1992	17 days	—	Independent	Suchinda	Bhumibol Adulyadej r. 1946–2016 (Rama IX)
(18)		Anand Panyarachun อานันท์ ปันยารชุน (born 1932)	10 June 1992	23 September 1992	105 days	—	Independent	Anand II	Bhumibol Adulyadej r. 1946–2016 (Rama IX)
20		Chuan Leekpai ชวน หลีกภัย (born 1938)	23 September 1992	13 July 1995	2 years, 293 days	Sep. 1992	Democrat	Chuan I	Bhumibol Adulyadej r. 1946–2016 (Rama IX)
21		Banharn Silpa-archa บรรหาร ศิลปอาชา (1932–2016)	13 July 1995	25 November 1996	1 year, 135 days	1995	Thai Nation	Banharn	Bhumibol Adulyadej r. 1946–2016 (Rama IX)
22		Chavalit Yongchaiyudh ชวลิต ยงใจยุทธ (born 1932)	25 November 1996	9 November 1997	349 days	1996	New Aspiration	Chavalit	Bhumibol Adulyadej r. 1946–2016 (Rama IX)
(20)		Chuan Leekpai ชวน หลีกภัย (born 1938)	9 November 1997	9 February 2001	3 years, 92 days	—	Democrat	Chuan II	Bhumibol Adulyadej r. 1946–2016 (Rama IX)
23		Thaksin Shinawatra (Note: Thaksin Shinawatra was on leave from 5 April until 23 May 2006.) ทักษิณ ชินวัตร (born 1949)	9 February 2001	19 September 2006	5 years, 222 days	2001	Thai Rak Thai	Thaksin I	Bhumibol Adulyadej r. 1946–2016 (Rama IX)
23		Thaksin Shinawatra ทักษิณ ชินวัตร (born 1949)	9 February 2001	19 September 2006	5 years, 222 days	2005	Thai Rak Thai	Thaksin II	Bhumibol Adulyadej r. 1946–2016 (Rama IX)
23		Thaksin Shinawatra ทักษิณ ชินวัตร (born 1949)	9 February 2001	19 September 2006	5 years, 222 days	2006 (Note: Annulled election.)	Thai Rak Thai	Thaksin II	Bhumibol Adulyadej r. 1946–2016 (Rama IX)
—		Chitchai Wannasathit ชิดชัย วรรณสถิตย์ (born 1946); Acting Prime Minister	5 April 2006	23 May 2006	48 days	—	Thai Rak Thai	Thaksin II	Bhumibol Adulyadej r. 1946–2016 (Rama IX)
—		Sonthi Boonyaratglin สนธิ บุญยรัตกลิน (born 1946); Head of the Council for Democratic Reform	19 September 2006	1 October 2006	12 days	—	Military	Council for Democratic Reform	Bhumibol Adulyadej r. 1946–2016 (Rama IX)
24		Surayud Chulanont สุรยุทธ์ จุลานนท์ (born 1943)	1 October 2006	29 January 2008	1 year, 120 days	—	Independent	Surayud	Bhumibol Adulyadej r. 1946–2016 (Rama IX)
25		Samak Sundaravej สมัคร สุนทรเวช (1935–2009)	29 January 2008	9 September 2008	224 days	2007	People's Power	Samak	Bhumibol Adulyadej r. 1946–2016 (Rama IX)
—		Somchai Wongsawat (Note: Somchai Wongsawat was the Acting Prime Minister until 18 September 2008.) สมชาย วงศ์สวัสดิ์ (born 1947)	9 September 2008	18 September 2008	9 days	—	People's Power	Samak	Bhumibol Adulyadej r. 1946–2016 (Rama IX)
26		Somchai Wongsawat สมชาย วงศ์สวัสดิ์ (born 1947)	18 September 2008	2 December 2008	75 days	—	People's Power	Somchai	Bhumibol Adulyadej r. 1946–2016 (Rama IX)
—		Chavarat Charnvirakul ชวรัตน์ ชาญวีรกูล (born 1936); Acting Prime Minister	2 December 2008	17 December 2008	15 days	—	Independent	Somchai	Bhumibol Adulyadej r. 1946–2016 (Rama IX)
27		Abhisit Vejjajiva อภิสิทธิ์ เวชชาชีวะ (born 1964)	17 December 2008	5 August 2011	2 years, 231 days	—	Democrat	Abhisit	Bhumibol Adulyadej r. 1946–2016 (Rama IX)
28		Yingluck Shinawatra ยิ่งลักษณ์ ชินวัตร (born 1967)	5 August 2011	7 May 2014	2 years, 275 days	2011	Pheu Thai	Yingluck	Bhumibol Adulyadej r. 1946–2016 (Rama IX)
28		Yingluck Shinawatra ยิ่งลักษณ์ ชินวัตร (born 1967)	5 August 2011	7 May 2014	2 years, 275 days	2014	Pheu Thai	Yingluck	Bhumibol Adulyadej r. 1946–2016 (Rama IX)
—		Niwatthamrong Boonsongpaisan นิวัฒน์ธำรง บุญทรงไพศาล (born 1948); Acting Prime Minister	7 May 2014	22 May 2014	15 days	—	Pheu Thai	Yingluck	Bhumibol Adulyadej r. 1946–2016 (Rama IX)
—		Prayut Chan-o-cha (Note: Prayut Chan-o-cha was the Leader of the National Council for Peace and Order until 24 August 2014. During his term as prime minister, Prayut was suspended by the Constitutional Court from 24 August until 30 September 2022.) ประยุทธ์ จันทร์โอชา (born 1954)	22 May 2014	24 August 2014	94 days	—	Military (until 2014)	National Council for Peace and Order	Bhumibol Adulyadej r. 1946–2016 (Rama IX)
29		Prayut Chan-o-cha ประยุทธ์ จันทร์โอชา (born 1954)	24 August 2014	22 August 2023	8 years, 363 days	—	Military (until 2014)	Prayut I	Bhumibol Adulyadej r. 1946–2016 (Rama IX)
29		Prayut Chan-o-cha ประยุทธ์ จันทร์โอชา (born 1954)	24 August 2014	22 August 2023	8 years, 363 days	—	Independent (Note: Prayut Chan-o-cha was close to the Palang Pracharath Party from 2019 until 2022, as the prime ministerial candidate of the party.) (2014–2023)	Prayut I	Bhumibol Adulyadej r. 1946–2016 (Rama IX)
29		Prayut Chan-o-cha ประยุทธ์ จันทร์โอชา (born 1954)	24 August 2014	22 August 2023	8 years, 363 days	—	Independent (2014–2023)	Prayut I	Vajiralongkorn r. 2016–present (Rama X)
29		Prayut Chan-o-cha ประยุทธ์ จันทร์โอชา (born 1954)	24 August 2014	22 August 2023	8 years, 363 days	2019	Independent (2014–2023)	Prayut II	Vajiralongkorn r. 2016–present (Rama X)
29		Prayut Chan-o-cha ประยุทธ์ จันทร์โอชา (born 1954)	24 August 2014	22 August 2023	8 years, 363 days	2019	United Thai Nation (2023)	Prayut II	Vajiralongkorn r. 2016–present (Rama X)
29		Prayut Chan-o-cha ประยุทธ์ จันทร์โอชา (born 1954)	24 August 2014	22 August 2023	8 years, 363 days	2019	Independent (from 2023)	Prayut II	Vajiralongkorn r. 2016–present (Rama X)
—		Prawit Wongsuwon ประวิตร วงษ์สุวรรณ (born 1945); Acting Prime Minister	24 August 2022	30 September 2022	37 days	—	Palang Pracharath	Prayut II	Vajiralongkorn r. 2016–present (Rama X)
30		Srettha Thavisin เศรษฐา ทวีสิน (born 1962)	22 August 2023	14 August 2024	358 days	2023	Pheu Thai	Srettha	Vajiralongkorn r. 2016–present (Rama X)
—		Phumtham Wechayachai ภูมิธรรม เวชยชัย (born 1953); Acting Prime Minister	14 August 2024	16 August 2024	2 days	—	Pheu Thai	Srettha	Vajiralongkorn r. 2016–present (Rama X)
31		Paetongtarn Shinawatra (Note: Paetongtarn Shinawatra was suspended by the Constitutional Court from 1 July until 29 August 2025.) แพทองธาร ชินวัตร (born 1986)	16 August 2024	29 August 2025	1 year, 13 days	—	Pheu Thai	Paetongtarn	Vajiralongkorn r. 2016–present (Rama X)
—		Suriya Juangroongruangkit สุริยะ จึงรุ่งเรืองกิจ (born 1954); Acting Prime Minister	1 July 2025	3 July 2025	2 days	—	Pheu Thai	Paetongtarn	Vajiralongkorn r. 2016–present (Rama X)
—		Phumtham Wechayachai ภูมิธรรม เวชยชัย (born 1953); Acting Prime Minister	3 July 2025	7 September 2025	66 days	—	Pheu Thai	Paetongtarn	Vajiralongkorn r. 2016–present (Rama X)
32		Anutin Charnvirakul อนุทิน ชาญวีรกูล (born 1966)	7 September 2025	Incumbent	1 year, 74 days	—	Bhumjaithai	Anutin I	Vajiralongkorn r. 2016–present (Rama X)
32		Anutin Charnvirakul อนุทิน ชาญวีรกูล (born 1966)	7 September 2025	Incumbent	1 year, 74 days	2026	Bhumjaithai	Anutin II	Vajiralongkorn r. 2016–present (Rama X)

== See also ==
- List of prime ministers of Thailand by time in office
- Prime Minister of Thailand
- Constitution of Thailand
- Government of Thailand
- Office of the Prime Minister
- Cabinet of Thailand
- List of samuhanayok
