= List of prime ministers of Thailand by time in office =

This is a list of prime ministers of Thailand by time in office. The basis of the list is the inclusive number of days from being sworn in until leaving office.

== Rank by time in office ==
Updated daily according to UTC.

Rank	No.	Prime minister	Portrait	Party	Assumed office	Left office	Time in office (term)	Time in office (total)
1	3rd	Plaek Phibunsongkhram (1897–1964)		Khana Ratsadon (Military faction)	16 December 1938	1 August 1944	5 years, 229 days	15 years, 25 days
1	3rd	Plaek Phibunsongkhram (1897–1964)		Conservative	8 April 1948	16 September 1957	9 years, 161 days	15 years, 25 days
1	3rd	Plaek Phibunsongkhram (1897–1964)		Seri Manangkhasila	8 April 1948	16 September 1957	9 years, 161 days	15 years, 25 days
2	10th	Thanom Kittikachorn (1911–2004)		National Socialist	1 January 1958	20 October 1958	292 days	10 years, 236 days
2	10th	Thanom Kittikachorn (1911–2004)		Military	9 December 1963	14 October 1973	9 years, 309 days	10 years, 236 days
2	10th	Thanom Kittikachorn (1911–2004)		United Thai People's	9 December 1963	14 October 1973	9 years, 309 days	10 years, 236 days
2	10th	Thanom Kittikachorn (1911–2004)		Military	9 December 1963	14 October 1973	9 years, 309 days	10 years, 236 days
3	29th	Prayut Chan-o-cha (born 1954)		Military	24 August 2014	22 August 2023	8 years, 363 days	
3	29th	Prayut Chan-o-cha (born 1954)		Palang Pracharath	24 August 2014	22 August 2023	8 years, 363 days	
4	16th	Prem Tinsulanonda (1920–2019)		Military	3 March 1980	4 August 1988	8 years, 154 days	
5	20th	Chuan Leekpai (born 1938)		Democrat	23 September 1992	13 July 1995	2 years, 293 days	6 years, 20 days
5	20th	Chuan Leekpai (born 1938)		Democrat	9 November 1997	9 February 2001	3 years, 92 days	6 years, 20 days
6	23rd	Thaksin Shinawatra (born 1949)		Thai Rak Thai	9 February 2001	19 September 2006	5 years, 222 days	
7	2nd	Phahon Phonphayuhasena (1887–1947)		Khana Ratsadon (Military faction)	21 June 1933	16 December 1938	5 years, 178 days	
8	11th	Sarit Thanarat (1908–1963)		Military	9 February 1959	8 December 1963	4 years, 302 days	
9	28th	Yingluck Shinawatra (born 1967)		Pheu Thai	5 August 2011	7 May 2014	2 years, 275 days	
10	27th	Abhisit Vejjajiva (born 1964)		Democrat	17 December 2008	5 August 2011	2 years, 231 days	
11	17th	Chatichai Choonhavan (1920–1998)		Thai Nation	4 August 1988	23 February 1991	2 years, 203 days	
12	15th	Kriangsak Chamanan (1917–2003)		Military	11 November 1977	3 March 1980	2 years, 113 days	
12	15th	Kriangsak Chamanan (1917–2003)		National Democrat	11 November 1977	3 March 1980	2 years, 113 days	
13	4th	Khuang Aphaiwong (1902–1968)		Independent	1 August 1944	31 August 1945	1 year, 30 days	1 year, 232 days
13	4th	Khuang Aphaiwong (1902–1968)		Independent	31 January 1946	24 March 1946	52 days	1 year, 232 days
13	4th	Khuang Aphaiwong (1902–1968)		Democrat	10 November 1947	8 April 1948	150 days	1 year, 232 days
14	18th	Anand Panyarachun (born 1932)		Independent	2 March 1991	7 April 1992	1 year, 36 days	1 year, 141 days
14	18th	Anand Panyarachun (born 1932)		Independent	10 June 1992	23 September 1992	105 days	1 year, 141 days
15	21st	Banharn Silpa-archa (1932–2016)		Thai Nation	13 July 1995	25 November 1996	1 year, 135 days	
16	12th	Sanya Dharmasakti (1907–2002)		Independent	14 October 1973	15 February 1975	1 year, 124 days	
17	24th	Surayud Chulanont (born 1943)		Independent	1 October 2006	29 January 2008	1 year, 120 days	
18	8th	Thawan Thamrongnawasawat (1901–1988)		Constitutional Front	23 August 1946	8 November 1947	1 year, 77 days	
19	32nd	Anutin Charnvirakul (born 1966)		Bhumjaithai	7 September 2025	Incumbent	1 year, 44 days	
20	13th	Kukrit Pramoj (1911–1995)		Social Action	14 March 1975	20 April 1976	1 year, 37 days	
21	14th	Thanin Kraivichien (1927–2025)		Independent	8 October 1976	20 October 1977	1 year, 12 days	
22	30th	Srettha Thavisin (born 1962)		Pheu Thai	22 August 2023	14 August 2024	358 days	
23	1st	Manopakorn Nitithada (1884–1948)		Independent	28 June 1932	20 June 1933	357 days	
24	22nd	Chavalit Yongchaiyudh (born 1932)		New Aspiration	25 November 1996	9 November 1997	349 days	
25	6th	Seni Pramoj (1905–1997)		Free Thai	17 September 1945	31 January 1946	136 days	332 days
25	6th	Seni Pramoj (1905–1997)		Democrat	15 February 1975	14 March 1975	27 days	332 days
25	6th	Seni Pramoj (1905–1997)		Democrat	20 April 1976	6 October 1976	169 days	332 days
26	31st	Paetongtarn Shinawatra (born 1986)		Pheu Thai	16 August 2024	1 July 2025	319 days	
27	25th	Samak Sundaravej (1935–2009)		People's Power	29 January 2008	9 September 2008	224 days	
28	7th	Pridi Banomyong (1900–1983)		Free Thai	24 March 1946	23 August 1946	152 days	
29	9th	Pote Sarasin (1905–2000)		Independent	21 September 1957	1 January 1958	102 days	
30	26th	Somchai Wongsawat (born 1947)		People's Power	18 September 2008	2 December 2008	75 days	
31	19th	Suchinda Kraprayoon (1933–2025)		Independent	7 April 1992	24 May 1992	47 days	
32	5th	Thawi Bunyaket (1904–1971)		Free Thai	31 August 1945	17 September 1945	17 days	

== See also ==
- Prime Minister of Thailand
- List of prime ministers of Thailand
