= Tularak =

Tularak is a surname. Notable people with the surname include:

- Krachang Tularak (1913–2009), Thai politician
- Sanguan Tularak (1902–1995), Thai politician
