= 1957 Thai general election =

1957 Thai general election may refer to:

- February 1957 Thai general election
- December 1957 Thai general election
