= December 1957 Thai general election =

← February 1957	15 December 1957	1969 →
- 160 of the 281 seats in the House of Representatives
- Turnout: 44.07% (▼13.43pp)
Party	Leader	Seats	+/–
Sahaphum Party	Sukich Nimmanheminda	44	New
Democrat	Khuang Aphaiwong	39	+9
Economist	Thep Chotnuchit	6	+3
Liberal Democratic	Meth Rattanaprasit	5	−6
Seri Manangkhasila	Plaek Phibunsongkhram	4	−82
Nationalist	Net Poonwiwat	1	−2
Hyde Park	Taweesak Tripli	1	−1
Independent	Ket Wongkasai	1	−1
Independents	–	59	+51
This lists parties that won seats. See the complete results below.
Prime Minister before	Prime Minister after
Pote Sarasin; Independent	Thanom Kittikachorn; National Socialist

General elections were held in Thailand on 12 December 1957. They were the first elections after the coup led by Sarit Thanarat.

The new Sahaphum Party emerged as the largest party in parliament with 40 of the 160 elected seats, although with 59 MPs, independents were the largest bloc in Parliament. Voter turnout was 44%.

== Results ==
Party	Votes	%	Seats	+/–
Sahaphum Party			44	New
Democrat Party			39	+9
Economist Party			6	+3
Liberal Democratic Party			5	–6
Seri Manangkhasila Party			4	–82
Nationalist Party			1	–2
Hyde Park Movement Party			1	–1
Independent Party			1	–1
Independents			59	+51
Appointed members			121	–2
Total			281	–2
Total votes	4,370,589	–		
Registered voters/turnout	9,917,417	44.07		
Source: Nohlen et al.
