= Socialist Front (Thailand) =

Defunct political party in Thailand

Socialist Front พรรคแนวร่วมสังคมนิยม
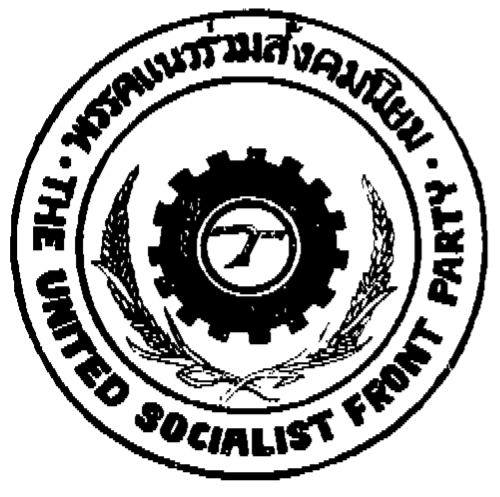
- Chairman: Keaw Norapiti
- Founded: 21 November 1974
- Dissolved: 1976
- Headquarters: Thailand
- Ideology: Socialism
- Political position: Left-wing

The Socialist Front was a political coalition in Thailand, formed by left-wing parties in late 1956. The main group in the coalition was the Economist Party, led by Thep Chotinuchit. The other two constituents of the Socialist Front were the Free Democratic Party and the Hyde Park Movement Party. Thep Chotinuch was the chairman of the Socialist Front. The parliamentarians who founded the Socialist Front came from northeast Thailand. The Socialist Front favoured a neutralist foreign policy, and called for Thai withdrawal from SEATO, as well as being strongly anti-American.

In the 1975 general election the Socialist Front won ten seats, all of them from the northeast. In total, the Socialist Front got 3.8 percent of the nationwide vote.

== History ==
The Socialist Front was dissolved following the military coup of 6 October 1976, when the National Administrative Reform Council dissolved all political parties in Thailand in the aftermath of the Thammasat University massacre.
