= Pong Punnakan =

Thai politician (1915–1990)

- พงษ์ ปุณณกันต์
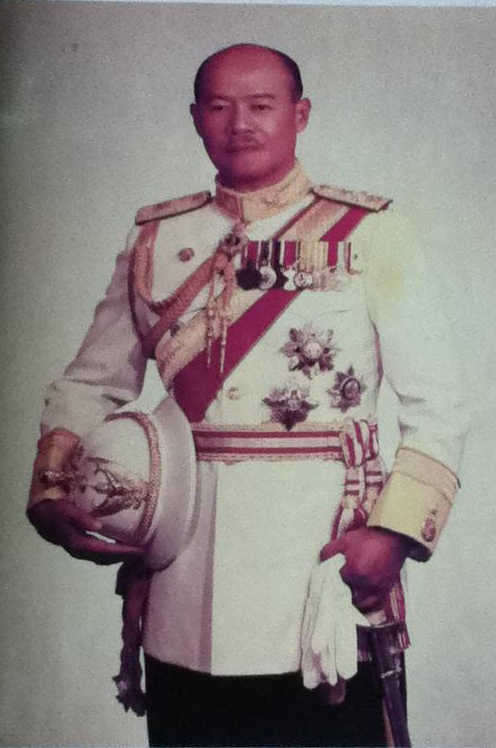

Minister of Transport
- In office 1 January 1958 – 7 March 1969
- Prime Minister: Thanom Kittikachorn
- In office 18 December 1972 – 14 October 1973
- Prime Minister: Thanom Kittikachorn

Personal details
- Born: 30 September 1915 Siam
- Died: 28 May 1990 (aged 74) Thailand
- Party: United Thai People's Party
- Relatives: Puttipong Punnakanta (grandson)

Military service
- Branch/service: Royal Thai Army
- Years of service: 1935-1973
- Rank: General

Pong Punnakan (Thai: พงษ์ ปุณณกันต์, RTGS: Phong; 30 September 1915 – 28 May 1990) was a former Deputy Minister of Transport In the government of Pott Sarasin and a former Minister of Transport Minister for four terms in the government of Field Marshal Thanom Kittikachorn and Field Marshal Sarit Thanarat. He was also a former Minister of Industry for one term in the government of Field Marshal Thanom Kittikachorn and a former Secretary-General of the Revolutionary Council during the 1958 Thai coup in Thailand.

== History ==
General Pong was the son of Captain Luang Phonwinaikit (Ampai Punnakan). He married Khun Ying Sa-at (formerly Adireksan). They had a son, Professor Dr. Lueporn. Punnakan, and he was the grandfather of Phuttiphong Punnakanta and Danupon Punnakanta.

General Pong was appointed as the Deputy Minister of Transport in the government of Pot Sarasin in 1957. He resigned, along with the entire cabinet, after the general election of the Thai House of Representatives in December 1957.

He was then appointed as the Minister of Transport again in the government of Field Marshal Thanom Kittikachorn for three terms (Cabinet 28, Cabinet 30, Cabinet 32) and in the government of Field Marshal Sarit Thanarat's government (Cabinet 29).

General Pong participated in the 1958 coup in Thailand, led by Field Marshal Sarit Thanarat, and served as the Secretary-General of the Revolutionary Council. He was also a member of the executive committee of the United Thai People's Party, which was headed by Prime Minister, Minister of Defense, and Supreme Commander Field Marshal Thanom Kittikachorn.

== Honour ==
- Knight Grand Cordon of the Order of the White Elephant (1961)
- Knight Grand Cordon of the Order of the Crown of Thailand (1960)
- Knight Grand Commander of the Order of Chula Chom Klao (1961)
- Victory Medal - Franco-Thai War
- Victory Medal - Pacific War
- Safeguarding the Constitution Medal
- Chakra Mala Medal
- King Rama IX Royal Cypher Medal, 3rd Class(1960)
- King Rama IX Coronation Medal (1950)
- 25th Buddhist Century Celebration Medal (1957)
- Red Cross Medal of Appreciation, 1st Class

=== Foreign Honours ===
- Italian Republic :
  - Knight Grand Cross of the Order of Merit of the Italian Republic (1961)
- Sweden :
  - Grand Cross of the Order of the Polar Star (1963)

== Military rank ==
- 14 November 1935 - First Lieutenant
