= Nationalist Party (Thailand) =

Defunct political party in Thailand

Nationalist Party พรรคชาตินิยม
- Founded: 6 February 1956
- Dissolved: 20 October 1958
- Headquarters: Thailand
- Ideology: Nationalism; Anti-communism
- Political position: Right-wing

The Nationalist Party (Thai: พรรคชาตินิยม; RTGS: chatniyom) was a political party in Thailand founded on 6 February 1956 by Net Poonwiwat was leader and Paisal Chatbood was secretary-general. The Nationalist Party won four seats in the general election of February 1957, which decreased to one seat in another general election held in December that year. Following a coup d'etat on 20 October 1958, the party was ordered to be dissolved by the military junta.
