= Khana Ratsadon =

Siamese political party from 1926 to 1947

Khana Ratsadon คณะราษฎร
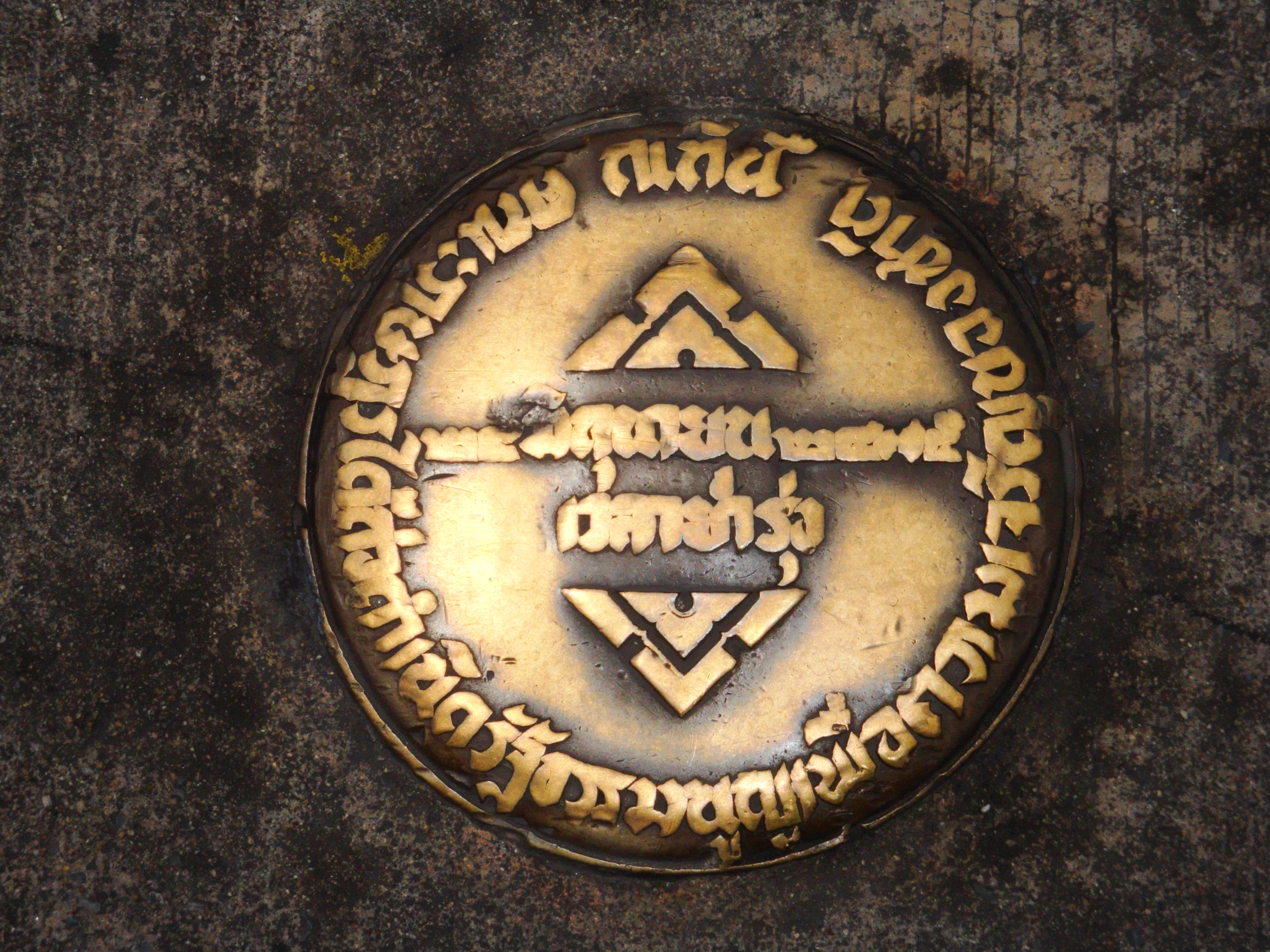
- 1932 Siamese Revolution memorial plaque at Dusit Palace Royal Plaza. On 14 April 2017, it disappeared and was replaced by an ultra-royalist plaque.
- Military leader: Phahon Phonphayuhasena; Plaek Phibunsongkhram
- Civilian leader: Pridi Banomyong
- Founded: 5 February 1927
- Dissolved: 8 November 1947
- Headquarters: Bangkok
- Newspaper: Support the Khana Ratsadon: 24 Mithuna; Kamakhorn; Satjjung; Sri Krung
- Membership (1932 est.): 10,000
- Ideology: Six Principles; Thai nationalism Constitutionalism; Factions: Anti-imperialism; Anti-communism; Revolutionary nationalism Fascism; Democratic socialism
- Political position: Syncretic

The Khana Ratsadon (Thai: คณะราษฎร, lit. 'People's Committee' or 'People's Party', pronounced [kʰā.náʔ râːt.sā.dɔ̄ːn]), or simply the Khanarad (คณะราษ), was a Siamese group of military and civil officers, and later a political party, which staged a bloodless revolution against King Prajadhipok's government and transformed the country's absolute monarchy to constitutional monarchy on 24 June 1932.

== Background ==
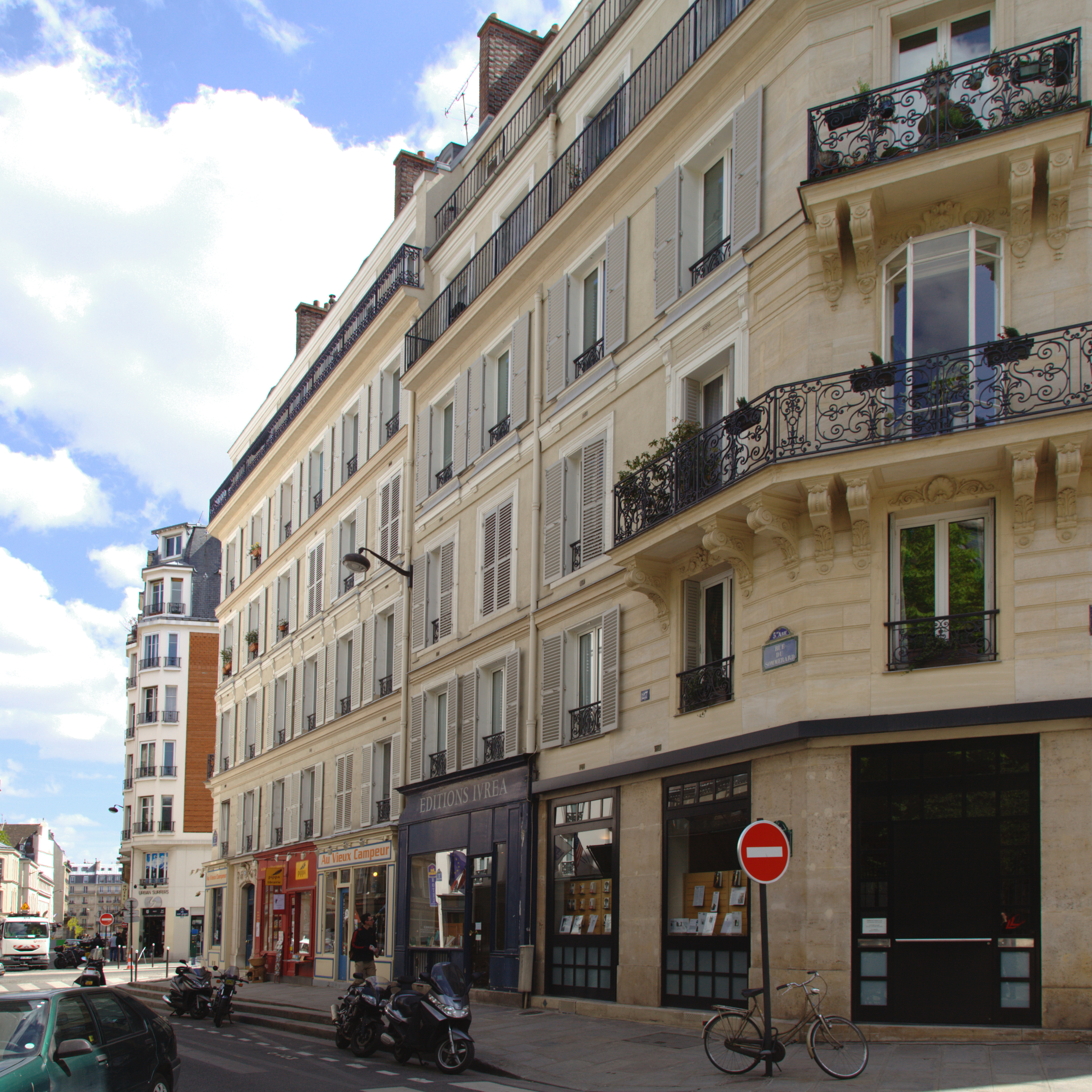
Rue Du Sommerard in Paris was the establishment place for the People's Party

=== The Promoters ===
In 1927, the Kingdom of Siam, the Rattanakosin Kingdom, was under the absolutist rule of the Chakri dynasty, under King Prajadhipok (Rama VII). Under his reign, the nation experienced troubles stemming from an archaic government confronted with serious economic problems and threats from abroad, the British and French Empires. The country was also experiencing a dramatic social change as the urban and middle classes of Bangkok started growing, slowly demanding more rights from their government, criticizing it as ineffective. These changes were mostly led by men, civilians and the military, who had graduated or travelled abroad. They wanted to transform Siam into a modern country like a Western democracy.

In February 1927, a group of seven Siamese students, later known as the "promoters", met at a hotel on the Rue Du Sommerard in Paris and founded what would become the Khana Ratsadon. For five days, they met and proposed arguments for and against various aspects of the movement, the men were:

1. Lieutenant Prayoon Pamornmontri (Thai: ประยูร ภมรมนตรี), Army officer, formerly of King Vajiravudh's Royal Guards
2. Lieutenant Plaek Khittasangkha (Thai: แปลก ขีตตะสังคะ), later Luang Phibulsonggram, Army officer, student, School of Applied Artillery, France
3. Lieutenant Thatsanai Mitphakdi (Thai: ทัศนัย มิตรภักดี), Army officer, student, French Cavalry Academy
4. Tua Lophanukrom (Thai: ตั้ว ลพานุกรม), scientist studying in Switzerland
5. Luang Siriratchamaitri (Thai: หลวงสิริราชไมตรี), diplomat, officer at the Siamese Embassy in Paris
6. Naep Phahonyothin (Thai: แนบ พหลโยธิน), law student studying in England
7. Pridi Banomyong (Thai: ปรีดี พนมยงค์), law student studying at the Institut d'Études Politiques de Paris

=== Six principles ===
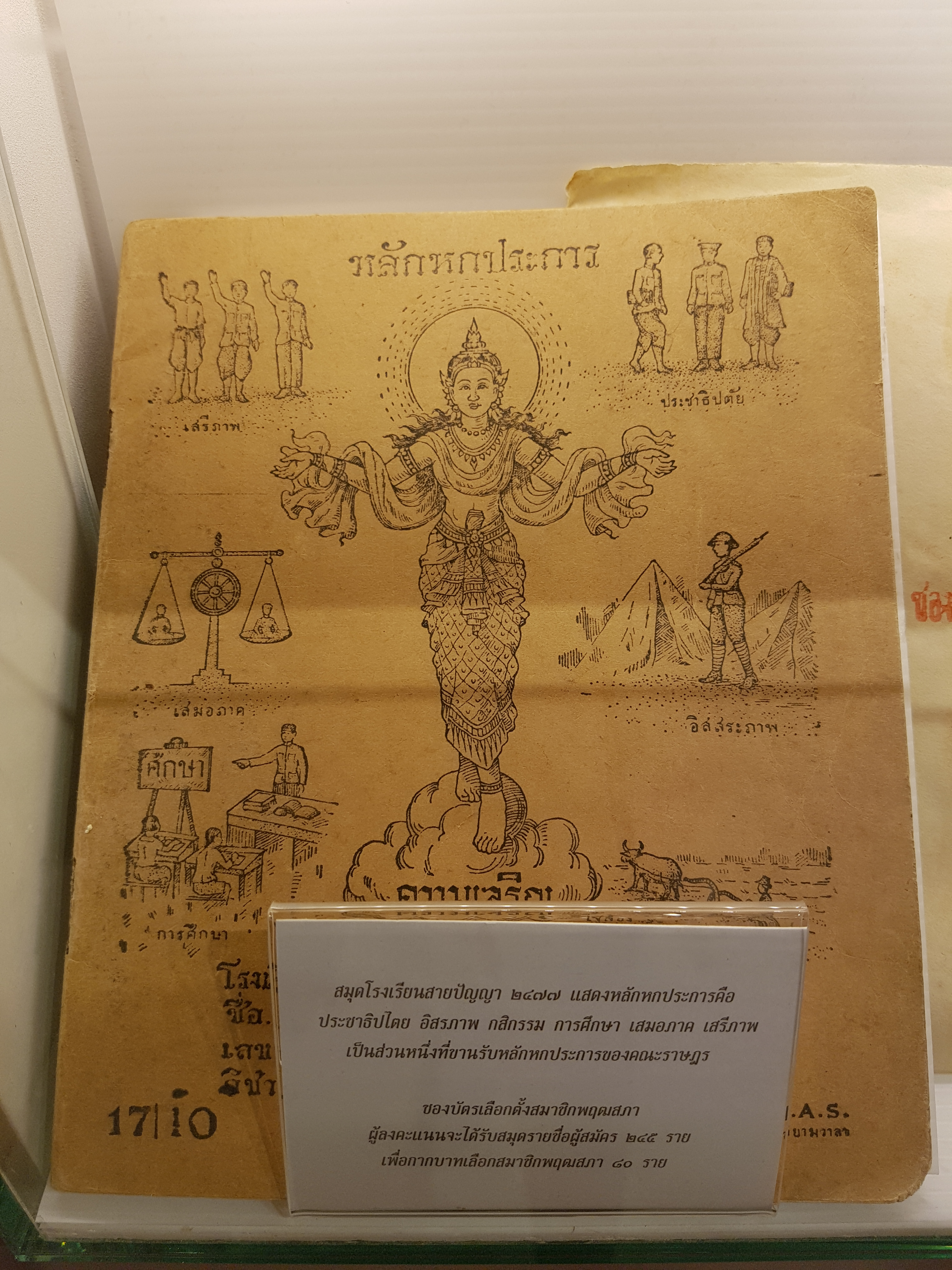
A school notebook published in 1934, with illustrations of the six principles on its cover, displayed at Thai Parliament Museum, Bangkok

The revolutionaries made Pridi Panomyong their president and termed themselves the "promoters" (Thai: ผู้ก่อการ; RTGS: Phu Ko Kan). The party determined a sixfold objective which was later called the "Six Principles" (Thai: หลักหกประการ; RTGS: Lak Hok Prakan), as follows:

1. To maintain the supreme power of the Thai people.
2. To maintain national security.
3. To maintain the economic welfare of the Thai people in accordance with the National Economic Project.
4. To protect the equality of the Thai people.
5. To maintain the people's rights and liberties, insofar as they are not inconsistent with any of the above-mentioned principles.
6. To provide public education for all citizens.

To achieve these goals, the party determined that they must overthrow, using force if necessary, the present government and the system of absolute monarchy and turn the Asian kingdom into a modern constitutional monarchy. Most of the members were students educated abroad, mostly in the United Kingdom and France.

When the group returned to Siam, they enlisted members from among the army and navy, the merchant class, civil servants and others. Their membership eventually reached 102, separated into four main branches. These included the civilians, led by Laung Praditmanutham; the navy, led by Group Commander Luang Sinthusongkhramchai; the junior army officers, led by Major Luang Phibulsonggram; and finally the senior officers, led by Colonel Phraya Phahonphonphayuhasena.

=== Other policies ===
In power, the Khana Ratsadon intensified assimilationist policies towards the Chinese community in Siam. From 1938 to 1939, it passed a series of laws to eliminate the economic influence of Chinese people, including prohibiting Chinese from certain professions, dealing in certain goods, and living in specified residential areas. The country's Nationality Law was amended in 1939 to require that all Chinese seeking to become citizens had to adopt Thai names, enroll their children in Thai schools, speak Thai, and renounce any allegiance to China.

== Legacy ==
The Khana Ratsadon was eventually successful in their goal of revolution by bloodless coup. By 1933 they had turned Siam into a single party state. However the party itself was short-lived, due to infighting as the party had too many factions, conflicting interests, and political beliefs. The party eventually divided into two factions, a civilian faction led by Pridi Banomyong, and a military faction led by Marshal Pibulsongkram.

They would dominate Thai politics for the next two decades, producing six Prime Ministers of Thailand from their ranks. The People's Party declined at about the time the Second World War ended, and was dissolved in 1947.

In the decades after the Khana Ratsadon lost power, continuing as into the 21st century, subsequent governments have taken action to downplay their significance and erase their legacy. Part of this was accomplished through the removal of architecture associated with the party, most significantly beginning with the demolition of Sala Chaloem Thai in 1989. This movement intensified in the 2010s; the Supreme Court building was controversially demolished in 2013, and following the 2014 coup, multiple landmarks became quietly removed without explanation. On the 88th anniversary of the revolution in 2020, the Reuters news service identified six historical markers memorialising the People's Party and the events of 1932 which have been removed or renamed over the previous year. In most cases it is not known who is responsible. Some historians, such as Chatri Prakitnonthakan of Silpakorn University, interpreted these removals as an attempted "ideological cleansing" by the conservative establishment.

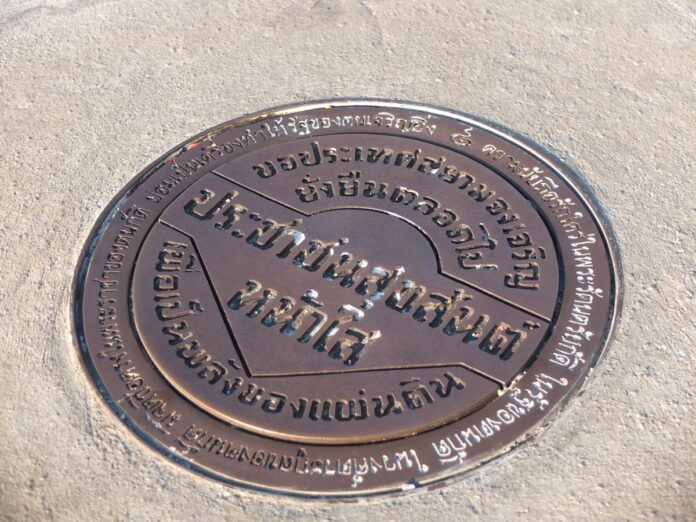
New plaque replaced in 2017

A memorial plaque honoring the 1932 Revolution was reported missing on 14 April 2017. It was thought to be stolen on 5 April and was replaced with another plaque with text praising the Chakri Dynasty. As of 2019, no one has taken responsibility for the theft. The 1932 Revolution brass plaque, about 30 centimeters across, was embedded in the asphalt of the Royal Plaza, less than 10 meters from the equestrian statue depicting King Rama V. The site is where the revolt took place on 24 June 1932. Here, a declaration condemning absolute monarchy was read. Press reports noted that ultraroyalist groups had threatened to remove the plaque in the months preceding its theft.

A Royal Thai Army artillery base in Lopburi Province bore the name of General Phraya Phahon until 2019 when, at the order of the current king, Vajiralongkorn, it was renamed King Bhumibol base. Long-standing statues of Phraya Phahon and Field Marshal Plaek Phibunsongkhram installed at the base were removed and replaced by a statue of King Bhumibol.

Public perception and discourse over the Khana Ratsadon's legacy has also fluctuated over time. Their role in establishing a constitutional monarchy was glossed over by school textbooks, and rhetoric dismissing the party's actions as premature was popularized. Such ideas were reignited in the 2010s, as ideological conflicts over democracy and the monarchy intensified. Conservative writers demonized the People's Party as republicans. This led to a reactionary response by liberal groups. During the 2020 protests, youth protesters symbolically installed a new plaque in Sanam Luang, and a group leading the protest movement called themselves "Khana Ratsadon 2563" (Khana Ratsadon 2020).

== Members ==
The members of the People's Party were a mix of both military officers and civilians. Lieutenant Krachang Tularak was its last surviving member. He died on 24 June 2009 at the age of 98.

=== Military faction ===
==== Army faction ====
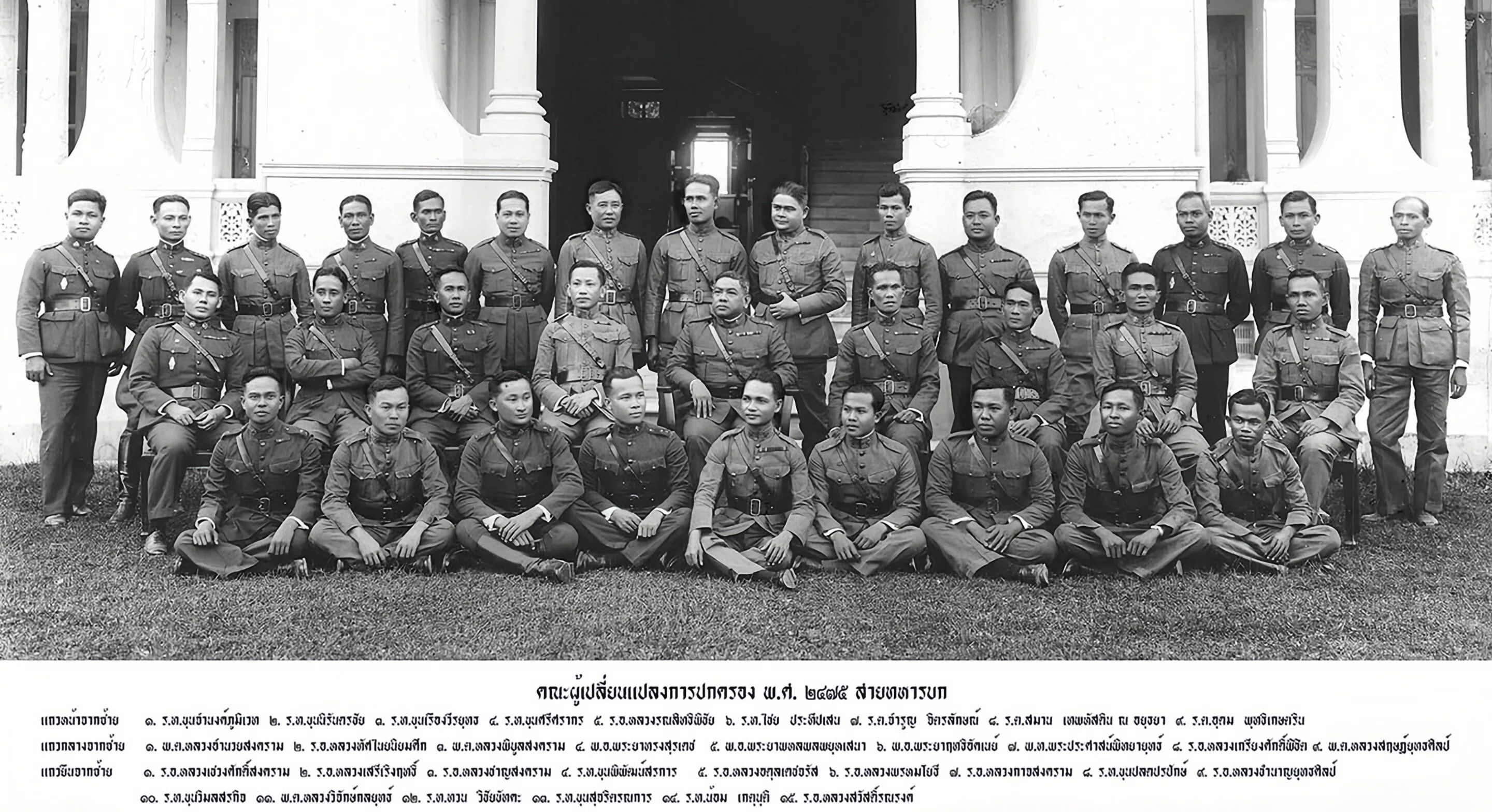
Khana Ratsadon (army faction)

1. Colonel Phraya Phahonphonphayuhasena (Phot Phahonyothin), the Head of the military faction and leader of Khana Ratsadon
2. Colonel Phraya Songsuradet (Deva Bandhumasena)
3. Colonel Phraya Ritthiakhaney (Sala Emasiri)
4. Lieutenent Colonel Phra Phrasasphithayayut (Wan Choothin)
5. Major Luang Phibulsonggram (Plaek Khittasangkha)
6. Captain Luang Chamnanyutthasin (Choei Rayanan)
7. Captain Luang Katsongkhram (Thian Kengradomying)
8. Captain Luang Kriangsakphichit (Khuan Chittakhun)
9. Captain Luang Chansongkhram (Phan Chalichan)
10. Captain Luang Chawengsaksongkhram (Chuang Khwanchoet)
11. Captain Luang Thatsanainiyomsuek (Thatsanai Mittraphakdi)
12. Captain Luang Phromyothi (Mangkon Phonchiwin)
13. Captain Luang Ronnasitthiphichai (Chuea Kanchanaphinthu)
14. Captain Luang Sawatronnarong (Sawat Darasawat)
15. Captain Luang Seriroengrit (Charun Rattanakun)
16. Captain Luang Aduldejcharat (Bat Phuengphrakhun)
17. Lieutenant Khun Sucharitronnakan (Phong Nakhanut)
18. Lieutenant Khun Chamnongphummiwet (Chamnong Siwaphaet)
19. Lieutenant Khun Nirandonchai (Sawek Nilanchai)
20. Lieutenant Khun Phiphatsorakan (Theng Phatthanasiri)
21. Lieutenant Khun Plotporapak (Plot Phanusawa)
22. Lieutenant Khun Rueangwirayut (Bunrueang Wirahong)
23. Lieutenant Khun Wimonsorakit (Wimon Kengrian)
24. Lieutenant Khun Sisarakon (Chalo Sithanakon)
25. Lieutenant Chai Prathipasen
26. Lieutenant Thuan Wichaikhatthakha
27. Lieutenant Nom Ketunuti
28. Minor Lieutenant Charun Chittralak
29. Minor Lieutenant Saman Thephatsadin Na Ayutthaya
30. Minor Lieutenant Udom Phutthikasetarin
31. Major Luang Wichakkonlayut (Sian Susin)

==== Navy faction ====
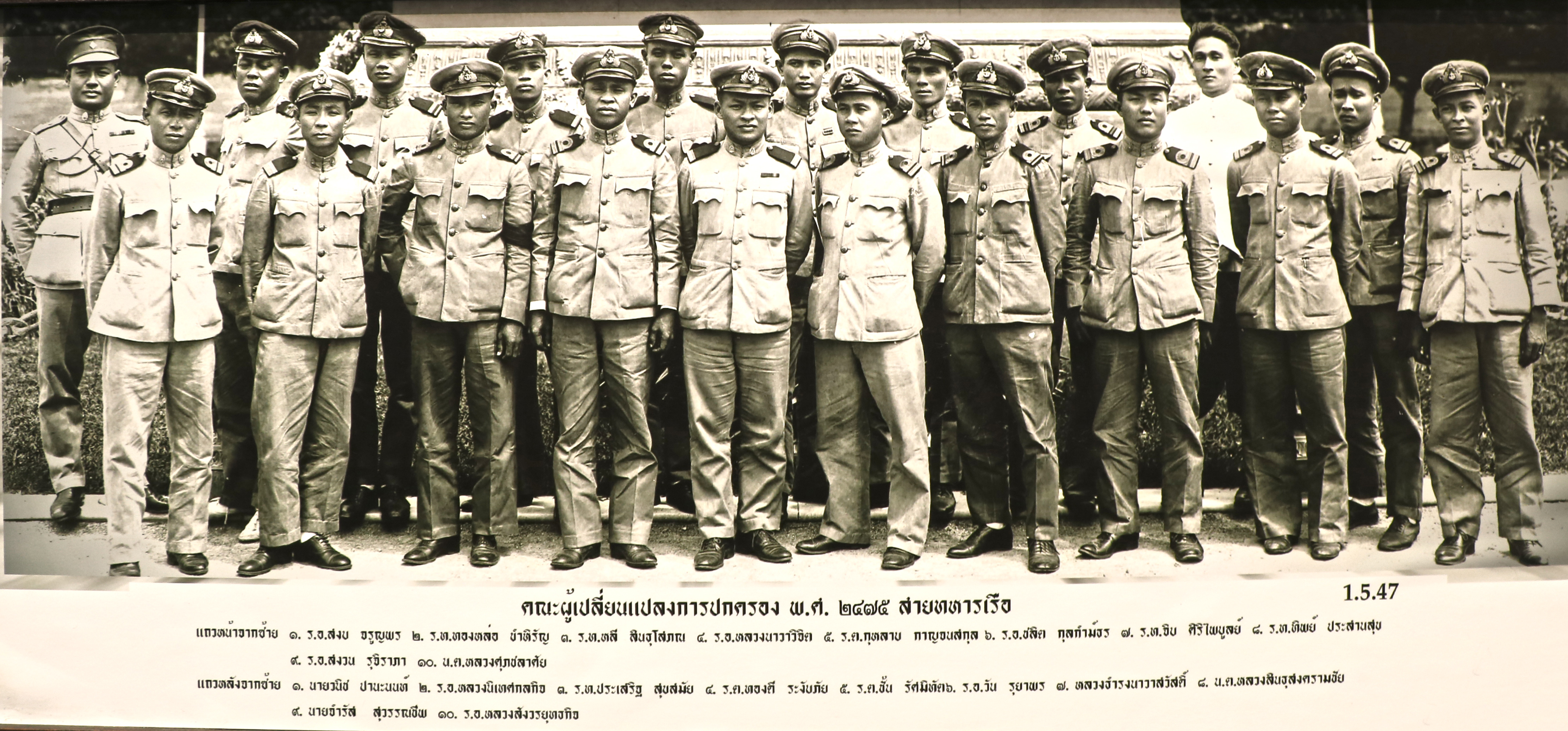
Khana Ratsadon (navy faction)

1. Group Commander Luang Sinthusongkhramchai (Sin Kamalanavin)
2. Lieutenant Commander Luang Supachalasai (Bung Supachalasai)
3. Senior Lieutenant Luang Thamrongnawasawat (Thawan Tharisawat)
4. Senior Lieutenant Luang Sangworayutthakit (Sangson Suwannachip)
5. Senior Lieutenant Luang Nithetkonlakit (Klang Rotchanasena)
6. Senior Lieutenant Luang Nawawichit (Phan Amphaiwan)
7. Senior Lieutenant Sa-nguan Ruchirapha
8. Senior Lieutenant Sa-ngop Charunphon
9. Senior Lieutenant Chalit Kunkamthon
10. Junior Lieutenant Thonglo Khamhiran
11. Junior Lieutenant Chip Siriphaibun
12. Junior Lieutenant Prasoet Suksamai
13. Junior Lieutenant Wan Ruyuphon
14. Ensign Chan Ratsamithat
15. Ensign Thongdi Ra-ngapphai
16. Chamrat Suwannachip

=== Civil faction ===
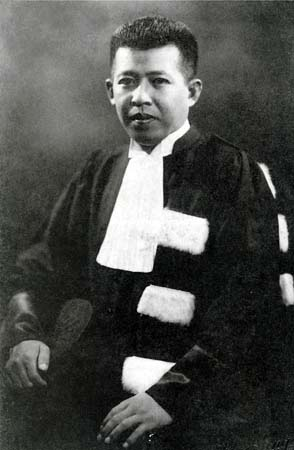
Pridi Banomyong, leader of civilian faction

1. Luang Praditmanutham (Pridi Phanomyong), the head of the civil faction and vice leader of Khana Ratsadon
2. Luang Sirirajmaitree (Charun Singhaseni)
3. Luang Kowit-aphaiwong (Khuang Aphaiwong)
4. Luang Naruebetmanit (Sa-nguan Chuthatemi)
5. Luang Chamnanitikaset (Uthai Saengmani)
6. Luang Atthasanraprasit (Thongyen Lilamia)
7. Luang Atthakitikamchon (Klueng Phahomyonh)
8. Luang Sunthonthephatsadin (Saphrang Thephatsadin Na Ayutthaya)
9. Luang Dechatiwongwarawat (M.L. Kri Dechatiwong)
10. Tua Laphanukrom
11. Prachuap Bunnak
12. M.L. Udom Sanitwong
13. Naep Phahonlayothin
14. Thawi Bunyaket
15. Junior Lieutenant Prayoon Pamornmontri
16. Wilat Osathanon
17. Charun Suepsaeng
18. Leng Sisonwong
19. Direk Jayanama
20. Wichian Suwannathat
21. Chun Pinthanon
22. Sawat Sotthithat
23. Chittasen Pancha
24. Yong Phonlabun
25. Ek Supphapodok
26. Surin Chinothai
27. Siri Chatinan
28. Chaliao Pathummarot
29. Banchong Sicharun
30. Prasoet Sicharun
31. Chaeng Muttafa
32. Karim Sicharun
33. Sanguan Tularak
34. Sim Wirawaithaya
35. Nguan Thongprasoet
36. Pramot Phuengsunthon
37. Charoen Pantharo
38. Thongpleo Chonlaphum
39. Phadoem Angsuwat
40. Chup Salayachiwin
41. Klin Thephatsadin Na Ayutthaya
42. Son Bunchung
43. Yon Samananon
44. Yin Samananon
45. Police Lieutenant Choei Kalanchai
46. Police Lieutenant Thiang Chaloemsak

== Khana Ratsadon Speaker ==
Name	Portrait	Start Date	End Date	Election
Phraya Sorayuthaseni		26 February 1934	22 September 1934	— (1st)
Phraya Sorayuthaseni		6 July 1943	24 June 1944	— (3rd)

== Khana Ratsadon Prime Ministers ==
Name	Portrait	Start Date	End Date	Election
Phahon Phonphayuhasena		21 June 1933	16 December 1938	— 1933 (1st) , 1937 (2nd)
Plaek Phibunsongkhram		16 December 1938	1 August 1944	1938 (3rd)
Khuang Aphaiwong		1 August 1944	31 August 1945	— (3rd)
Khuang Aphaiwong		31 January 1946	24 March 1946	Jan 1946 (4th)
Thawi Bunyaket		31 August 1945	17 September 1945	— (3rd)

== See also ==
- Siamese revolution of 1932
- June 1933 Siamese coup d'état
- History of Thailand (1932–1973)
- Prajadhipok
- List of prime ministers of Thailand
