= 1938 Siamese general election =

- 12 November 1938
- 91 of the 182 seats in the House of Representatives
- Turnout: 35.03% (▼5.19pp)
Party	Seats	+/–
Independents (Khana Ratsadon)	91	0
This lists parties that won seats. See the complete results below.
Prime Minister before	Prime Minister after
Phahon Phonphayuhasena	Plaek Phibunsongkhram

General elections were held in Siam on 12 November 1938 to elect 91 members of the 182-seat House of Representatives. The other 91 members had been appointed by King Ananda Mahidol after the 1937 elections. At the time there were no political parties, so all candidates ran as independents. Voter turnout was 35%.

== Results ==
Party	Votes	%	Seats
Independents			91
Royal appointees			91
Total			182
Total votes	2,210,332	–	
Registered voters/turnout	6,310,172	35.03	
Source: Nohlen et al.
