= Liberal Democratic Party (Thailand) =

Liberal Democratic Party พรรคเสรีประชาธิปไตย
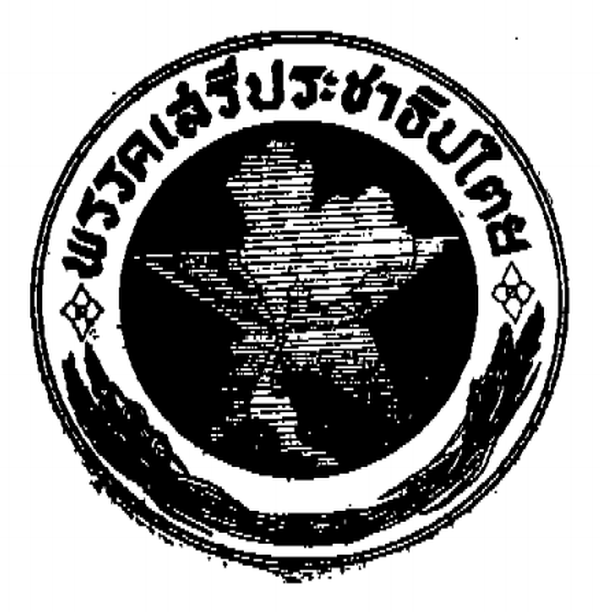
- Chairman: Meth Rattanaprasit
- Secretary-General: Boonkum Jansrisuriyawong
- Founded: 1 November 1955
- Dissolved: 20 October 1958
- Headquarters: Thailand
- Ideology: Liberal democracy Liberal socialism
- Political position: Centre

The Liberal Democratic Party (Thai: พรรคเสรีประชาธิปไตย), also known as Free Democracy, is a political party of Thailand founded on 1 November 1955. Meth Rattanaprasit is leader and Boonkum Jansrisuriyawong is secretary-general and Jarubud Ruangsuwan is vice-secretary-general. In 26 February 1957 Liberal Democratic Party won in election. They won 11 seats. In 15 December 1957 Liberal Democratic Party won in election, they won 5 seats.

== Party leadership ==
=== Past Leaders ===
| No. | Name | From | To |
|---|---|---|---|
| 1 | Meth Rattanaprasit | 1955 | 1957 |
| 2 | Jarubud Ruangsuwan | 1968 | 1970 |
| 3 | Somkit Srisangkom | 1970 | 1971 |
| 4 | Samak Pongsatian | 1990 | 1992 |
| 5 | Suban Sangpan | 1995 | 24 June 1997 |
| 6 | Wiwat Utthaworasit | 24 June 1997 | 1998 |

== General election results ==
| Election | Total seats won | Total votes | Election leader |
|---|---|---|---|
| 1957 (Feb) | 11 / 160 | | Meth Rattanaprasit |
| 1957 (Dec) | 5 / 160 | | Meth Rattanaprasit |
| 1969 | 1 / 219 | | Jarubud Ruangsuwan |
