= February 1957 Thai general election =

- 26 February 1957
- 160 of the 283 seats in the House of Representatives
- Turnout: 57.50% (▲18.55pp)
Party	Leader	Seats
Seri Manangkhasila	Plaek Phibunsongkhram	86
Democrat	Khuang Aphaiwong	31
Liberal Democratic	Meth Rattanaprasit	11
Thammathibat	Piam Bunyachot	9
Economist	Thep Chotnuchit	9
Nationalist	Net Poonwiwat	3
Hyde Park	Petai Chotnuchit	2
Independent	Ket Wongkasai	2
Independents	–	8
This lists parties that won seats. See the complete results below.
Prime Minister before	Prime Minister after
Plaek Phibunsongkhram; Seri Manangkhasila	Plaek Phibunsongkhram; Seri Manangkhasila

General elections were held in Thailand on 26 February 1957. The result was a victory for the Seri Manangkhasila Party, which won 86 of the 160 elected seats, with the 123 appointed members of the previous parliament continued to serve in the newly elected one. Voter turnout was 57%, significantly higher than previous elections (the previous record had been 41.5% in 1933), which was an indicator of heavy fraud.

== Results ==
Party	Votes	%	Seats
Seri Manangkhasila Party	137,735		86
Democrat Party	118,457		30
Liberal Democratic Party			11
Thammathibat			9
Economist Party			9
Nationalist Party			3
Hyde Park Movement Party			2
Independent Party			2
Independents			8
Appointed members			123
Total			283
Total votes	5,668,566	–	
Registered voters/turnout	9,859,039	57.50	
Source: Nohlen et al., Darling

=== By province ===
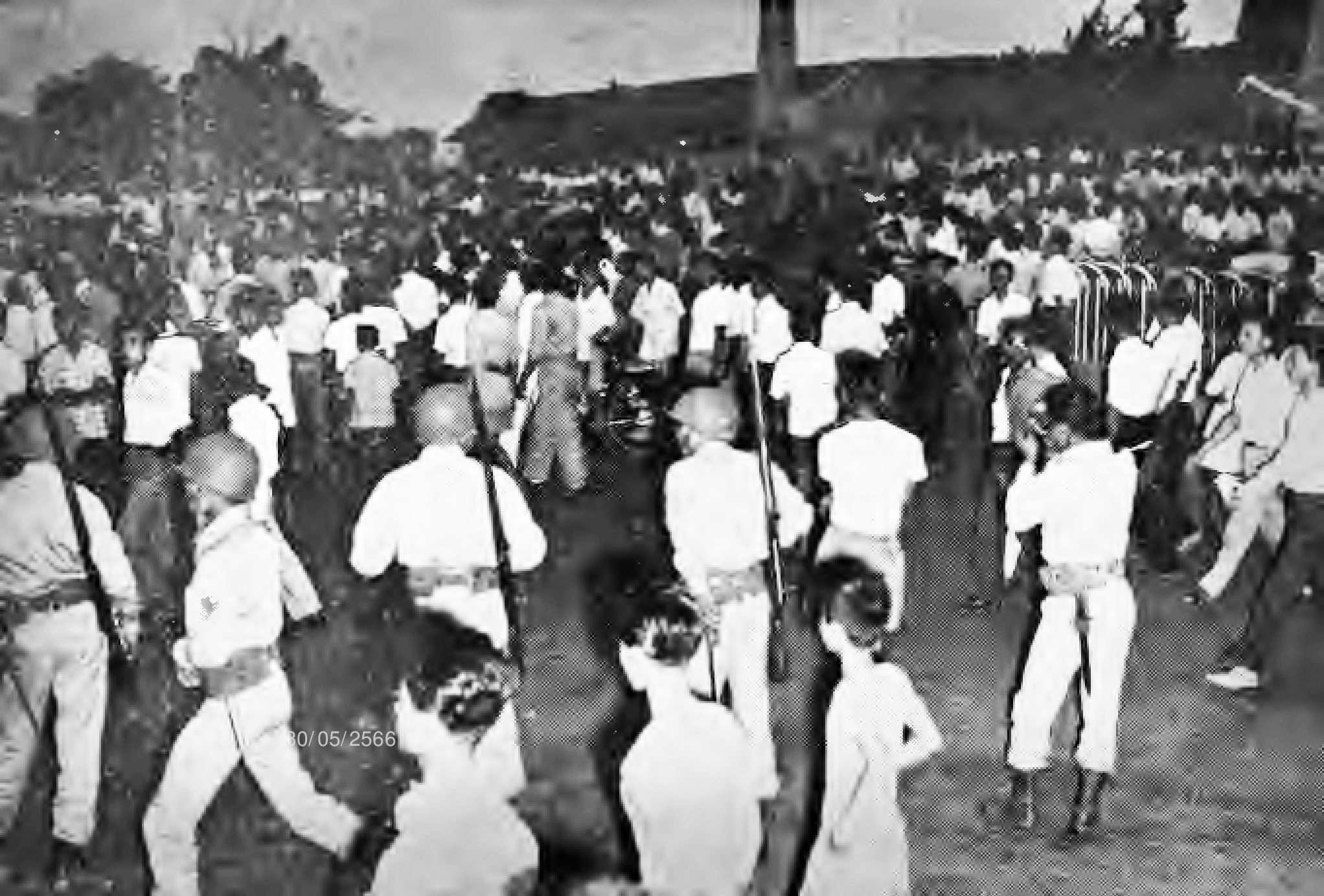
Lueaktang Kueng Phutthakan - 1957

Province	Total seats	Seats won								
Province	Total seats	SMP	DP	FD	T	EP	NP	HPMP	IP	Ind.
Ang Thong	1	1								
Bangkok	9	7	2							
Buriram	3	1		2						
Chachoengsao	2	2								
Chai Nat	1	1								
Chaiyaphum	3	1			1					1
Chanthaburi	1	1								
Chiang Mai	5	1	1							3
Chiang Rai	5	4								1
Chonburi	2	2								
Chumphon	1		1							
Kalasin	3		3							
Kamphaeng Phet	1	1								
Kanchanaburi	1	1								
Khon Kaen	5					4		1		
Krabi	1	1								
Lampang	3		3							
Lamphun	2		2							
Loei	1			1						
Lopburi	2	2								
Mae Hong Son	1	1								
Maha Sarakham	3					1			2	
Nakhon Nayok	1	1								
Nakhon Pathom	2	1			1					
Nakhon Phanom	3	1	2							
Nakhon Ratchasima	6	3	2							1
Nakhon Sawan	4	3	1							
Nakhon Si Thammarat	4	1	1		2					
Nan	1	1								
Narathiwat	2	1			1					
Nong Khai	1	1								
Nonthaburi	1				1					
Pathum Thani	1	1								
Pattani	2	2								
Phang Nga	1		1							
Phatthalung	1				1					
Phetchabun	2	1					1			
Phetchaburi	2	2								
Phichit	2	2								
Phitsanulok	2	2								
Phra Nakhon Si Ayutthaya	3	3								
Phrae	2	1					1			
Phuket	1		1							
Prachinburi	2	2								
Prachuap Khiri Khan	1	1								
Ranong	1	1								
Ratchaburi	3	3								
Rayong	1	1								
Roi Et	4	1	1	2						
Sakon Nakhon	3			3						
Samut Prakan	1	1								
Samut Sakhon	1				1					
Samut Songkhram	1	1								
Saraburi	2	2								
Satun	1	1								
Sing Buri	1	1								
Sisaket	4	2				2				
Songkhla	3	1	1							1
Sukhothai	2	1			1					
Suphan Buri	3	2						1		
Surat Thani	2		1							1
Surin	3	3								
Tak	1		1							
Thonburi	3	1	2							
Trang	1		1							
Trat	1	1								
Ubon Ratchathani	7	2	3			2				
Udon Thani	4		1	3						
Uthai Thani	1	1								
Uttaradit	2	1					1			
Yala	1	1								
Total	160	85	31	11	9	9	3	2	2	8
