= Krachang Tularak =

Member of the Free Thai Movement

Krachang Tularak (Thai: กระจ่าง ตุลารักษ์; RTGS: Kra-chang Tularak; June 18, 1913 – June 23, 2009) was a member of the Seri Thai and the Khana Ratsadon (People's Party). He participated in the Siamese Revolution of 1932. Krachang, a Thai Chinese of Teochew descent, was born in 1913 in Bang Khla District, Chachoengsao Province. During his childhood, he attended a Chinese school, giving him useful language skills in Teochew. He joined the Khana Ratsadon at 19 years old (1932) after being persuaded to join by his brother, Sanguan Tularak.

During the Second World War, Krachang Tularak joined the Seri Thai. He worked closely with his brother, Sanguan, and Pridi Banomyong. He was responsible for communications between China and the Seri Thai. He was involved in training with Tai Li in 1943, bringing nine Sino-Thai agents disguised as opium traders, and delivering a radio to Pridi. He also delivered a request that Pridi send a liaison party to China, something that was granted in October 1944. Towards the end of the war, Krachang was active in the Northeast, organizing anti-Japanese activities in Sakon Nakhon

Krachang Tularak died on the 23 of June, 2009. He was the last surviving member of Seri Thai. His memoir, “Seri Thai say tamniap Ta Chang", details his experiences in the Seri Thai.
