= Domestic policy of the Surayud Chulanont government =

The domestic policy of Surayud Chulanont as Prime Minister of Thailand affected the Thai economy, human rights, education, and numerous other areas. Appointed Prime Minister by a military junta that overthrew the government of Thaksin Shinawatra, he has been praised for his efforts to reverse the policies of the Thaksin government and to reduce the role of foreigners in the Thai economy. However, his policies have been controversial, and he been accused of economic mismanagement, rampant human rights abuses, and allowing the escalation of the South Thailand insurgency.

== New constitution ==
The junta's 2006 Interim Constitution authorized it to appoint a 2,000 person National Assembly which would select members to become candidates for a Constitution Drafting Assembly. From the onset of his appointment as Premier, Surayud Chulanont was urged by academics to override the junta's control of the constitution drafting process. Surayud eventually gave the junta a free hand in drafting the constitution.

The junta had originally promised to draft a permanent charter within eight months and to hold elections in October 2007. However, the Prime Minister's Office Minister Thirapat Serirangsan later announced that elections might not occur until one year and five months.

== Thaksin Shinawatra ==
Surayud warned deposed Premier Thaksin Shinawatra several times against returning to Thailand, calling his return "a threat". During a November 2006 trip to China for the ASEAN-China Summit, Surayud refused to meet Thaksin, who was also in China at the time. Surayud later denied Thaksin the opportunity to return to Thailand to contest in eventual elections, and said that the appropriate time for him to return would be "after a year," when a newly elected government was already in place.

Thaksin's diplomatic passport was revoked by the Foreign Ministry on 31 December 2006 after the government claimed he had engaged in political activities while in exile. Thai embassies were ordered not to facilitate his travels. Traditionally, all former prime ministers and foreign ministers of Thailand were permitted to hold on to their diplomatic passport for life.

Thaksin later publicly announced that he was quitting politics. Surayud's Defense Minister later announced that the junta would refuse Thaksin's reconciliation offer, claiming that Thailand was being threatened by "ill-intentioned people" and capitalism.

== Telecommunications ==
- The planned merger of state-telecom companies TOT and CAT.
- The cancellation of plans to list TOT, CAT, and Thai Post on the Stock Exchange of Thailand.
- The cancellation of the Thaksin government's telecom excise tax policy. The Thaksin government imposed an excise tax on privately offered fixed and cellular services, and then allowed telecom companies to deduct the amount they paid in excise tax from concession fees they had to pay to state concession owners TOT or CAT Telecom. The total amount paid by the private telecom firms did not change. The Surayud government's excise tax cancellation meant that TOT and CAT Telecom would receive their full concession payments. However, TOT and CAT were then forced to increase their dividends to the Ministry of Finance to account for their increased income.
- Changing the publicly listed state-enterprise media company MCOT's policy from focusing on monetary benefits to social benefits. MCOT's stock prices dropped 5.13% to an 11-month low as a result.

== Culture ==
- The planned ban against all forms of advertising for alcoholic beverages.
- The banning of all "sexually arousing dances" (locally called "coyote dances") during the Loy Kratong festival.

== Public health ==
- Making the 30-baht universal healthcare program completely free. The Budget Bureau criticized the move. The government later cut the universal healthcare program budget by over 3.8 billion baht, providing a subsidy of just 1,899 baht per head, compared to the previously proposed figure of 2,089 baht. The number of eligible people was cut from 48 to 46 million people.
- License the production and sale of patented HIV and heart disease drugs without the permission of the foreign patent owners. Lack of public health budget was cited as the reasons for breaking the patents. "It has stunned our industry," said the President of the Pharmaceutical Research and Manufacturers Association (PReMA). The Minister of Public Health claimed that pharmaceutical industry was reaping "colossal" profits. Under World Trade Organization rules, a government is allowed to break patents under after declaring a "national emergency." Breaking the patents of Abbott's HIV treatment Kaletra and Sanofi-Aventis' blood clot drug Plavix was estimated to save Thailand US$24 million a year.

== Energy ==
- The indefinite delay of the previous government's policy of converting all octane 95 gasoline sales to gasohol.
- The cancellation of state electricity company EGAT's guaranteed 50% share in all new power plant construction.
- The prevention of EGAT from participating in bidding for new electricity plants under the Independent Power Producer (IPP) program.
- The cancellation of plans to import hydroelectric power and natural gas from Myanmar.

== Security and the southern insurrection ==
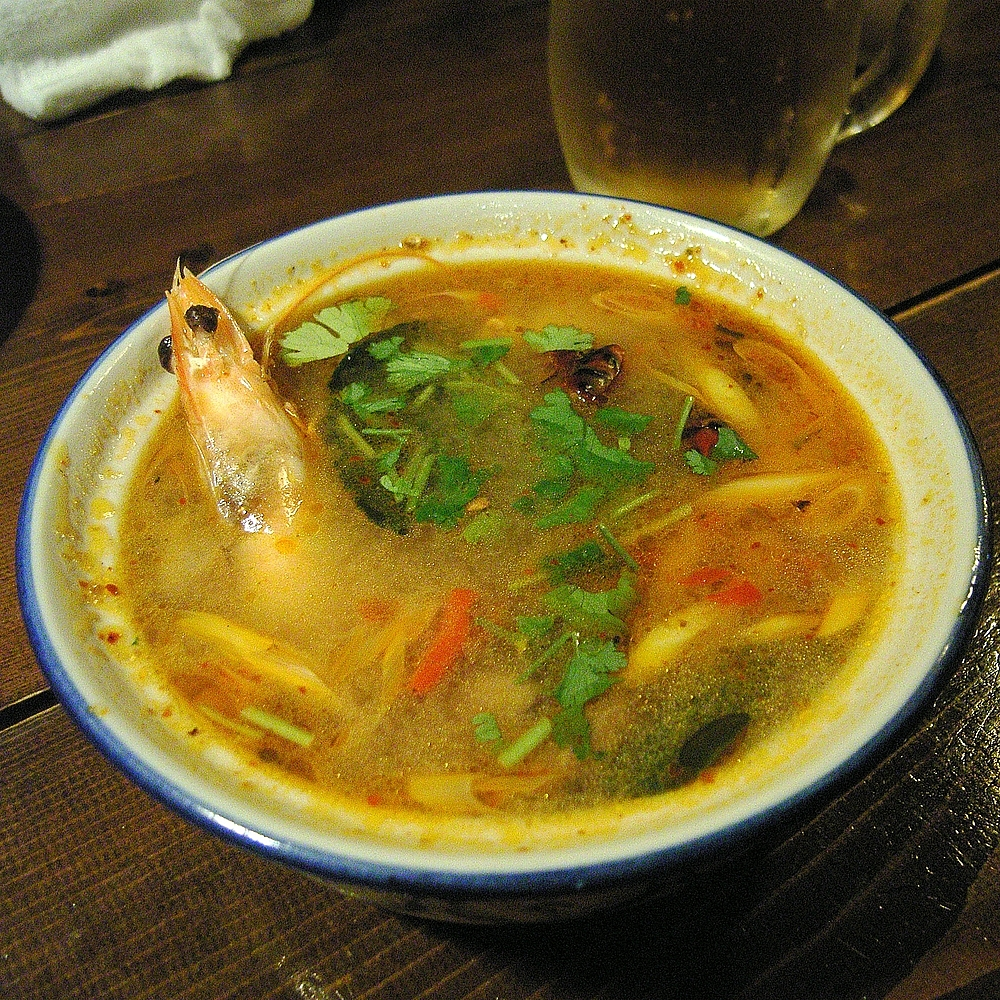
Tom Yam Kung

- An increase in military spending. Since 1999, military spending had remained stagnant at approximately $2 billion in 2000 dollars.
- Issuing a formal apology regarding the Tak Bai incident.
- Revealing for the first time to the public that the insurgency was being finance by a network of restaurants and stalls selling Tom Yam Kung in Malaysia. Surayud claimed that the Tom Yam Kung network collected money from local businessmen through blackmail and demands for protection fees and channelled the sum to the separatists. Malaysian Deputy Security Minister Fu Ah Kiow described the revelation as "absolutely baseless," and "very imaginative."
- Appointing Seripisut Temiyavet as Police Commissioner General, replacing Kowit Watana

== Education ==
- The cancellation of Thailand's participation in the One Laptop Per Child (OLPC) program. The project has been criticized as unrealistic.
- The cancellation of plans to install personal computers and broadband internet connections in every public and secondary school in Thailand.
- Forcing 430 prestigious schools across the country to accept half of their students from the local neighborhood. All other schools would be required to accept all applicants; if applicants exceeded seats, a random draw would choose which applicants would be accepted.
- The continuation of the Thaksin Shinawatra government's "One District, One Scholarship" program under the name "Scholarships for Community Development". The maximum annual income for eligible recipients' families was raised from 100,000 baht to 150,000 baht.

== Economy and agriculture ==
- A budget deficit of 147 billion Baht for fiscal year 2007. This was the first budget deficit since 2003.
- Elimination of subsidies for rice farmers. The price of rice, set at 30% above market prices during the deposed Thaksin Shinawatra government, was dramatically lowered. It was claimed that the high price of rice seriously affected farmers and caused social burdens.
- The cancellation of the Million Cows project. Under the project, the government lent five million cows to one million farming families. The families were allowed to sell milk and calves for profit. The program was highly popular among politicians.
- Capital controls in an attempt to reverse a massive appreciation of the Thai Baht. The moves caused a crash in the Thai stock market, with a one-day loss of 820 billion baht (approx. US$22 billion) in market value. The move resulted in harsh criticism both within Thailand and abroad. "My definition of what's going on is 'Welcome to amateur hour,'" said Donald Gimbel, fund manager for Carret & Co. Korn Chatikavanij of the Democrat party noted of a policy reversal, "That can't repair the damage that was caused in one historic day."
- Amid pressure from the junta to find wrongdoing in Thaksin Shinawatra's sale of Shin Corp to a Singaporean company, the Commerce Ministry altered regulations concerning foreign ownership companies. This impacted the legality of thousands of local subsidiaries of foreign companies operating in Thailand.
- Amendments to the Foreign Business Act that would limit foreign companies investing in List I and II businesses (including media, telecoms, and aviation) from holding more than 50% of shares. List III businesses (including retailers and hotels) were exempted from the new restrictions. Investors holding more than 50% would be forced to lower their stakes within a year. Investors holding more than 50% of voting rights would be forced to lower their voting stakes within a year. Finance Minister Pridiyathorn noted, "If they (foreign investors) had seen the details (of the foreign investment law), I am sure that they would be happy." Brokers and analysts criticized the move (widely seen as necessary in order to punishment Temasek Holdings for its acquisition of deposed Premier Thaksin Shinawatra's Shin Corporation) as politics intervening to hurt the economy. The governments of the United States, Canada, Switzerland, Japan, and European Union protested the move.
- The approval of debt-relief measures for farmers. This prompted Northeastern farmer leaders from cancelling a planned protests in Bangkok.
- Reopening Don Muang Airport for domestic and international flights after allegations that the newly opened Suvarnabhumi Airport alone was incapable of handling future traffic volume. The decision met with strong opposition from Airports of Thailand, the Civil Aviation Department, and domestic and international airlines. Surayud made the decision based on his personal advisors, without waiting for the Ministry of Transport to finish a study.

== Human rights ==
- Censorship of broadcast television. Troops were dispatched to all television stations on the night of the coup and remain there as of late December 2006. An interview with the late Nuamthong Phaiwan broadcast by television channel ITV came to an abrupt end after the Director of Army-owned Channel 5 called the station to warn them against the broadcast. Additional troops were dispatched to "keep order" at the station. Broadcast media were to stop airing news about former Prime Minister Thaksin Shinawatra and his associates.
- Censorship of community radio. Thousands of community radio stations were shut down after the coup. Community radio operators were only allowed to rebroadcast if they reported in the "spirit of national unity." The junta retained the authority to shut down any station at any time.
- Censorship of Somtow Sucharitkul's opera Ayodhya. It was thought that the on-stage death of the demon-king, Thotsakan, would constitute a bad omen. Somtow, a critic of deposed Prime Minister Thaksin Shinawatra, criticized the move but agreed to modify the scene.
- Massive censorship of the internet. Pre-coup, the government blocked 2,475 websites, while as of January 2007, the government blocked 13,435 websites - an increase of over 500%. In addition, the popular Midnight University web board was shut down for what the government claimed were posts offensive to the monarchy.
- The repeal of junta restrictions against organizing protests on 9 November 2006. However, martial law has been lifted in most of the country.
- The approval of a law that would imprison anyone found guilty of forwarding a pornographic email up to three years.
- The establishment of a 14,000-strong special operations force with a mandate to control anti-junta protests. The 556 million baht fund allocation came from a request by the Council for National Security. The rapid deployment force began operations on 1 December 2006. Surayud refused to explain why his Cabinet approved funding of the force after it had already started, which was contrary to PM's Office directives. Government spokesman Yongyuth Mayalarp promised that the force would be dissolved on 30 September 2007, along with the CNS. The funds would be diverted from the Defense Ministry and Police Office, but if those two agencies lacked funding, they would be diverted from the government's reserve fund for emergency situations. Yongyuth revealed that no Cabinet members questioned the use of the fund. General Saprang Kallayanamit, assistant Secretary-General of the CNS, was appointed Commander of the force.
- Arresting 26 Bo Bae Market illegal vendors protesting their forced relocation following a major fire. The protestors were charged with participating in an illegal gathering attended by more than 10 people. They later refused to air an interview that Thaksin had earlier made.
- Censorship of all mention of Thaksin Shinawatra from television.
- The torture of suspected insurgents by the military in the South. The Asian Human Rights Commission accused soldiers of seriously harming suspects by beating them, burning their genitals with cigarettes, smashing beer bottles over their knees, and chaining them to dogs.

== Other ==
- The granting of unprecedented salaries for the leaders of the military junta.
- Expanding Bangkok's mass transit rail network by 5 new routes, using the same amount as budgeted by the deposed Thaksin government.
