= Hyde Park Movement Party =

Hyde Park Movement Party พรรคขบวนการไฮด์ปาร์ค
- Founded: 21 March 1956
- Dissolved: 20 October 1958
- Headquarters: Thailand
- Political position: Left-wing

The Hyde Park Movement Party was a left-wing political party in Thailand.

In 1955, Marshal Plaek Pibulsonggram visited the United Kingdom as part of an international tour. He became impressed with the "Speakers' Corner" in Hyde Park, London. Upon his return to Thailand a "Hyde Park" space for free speech and assembly was instituted at the Phramane Grounds in Bangkok. The experiment was well received and effectively stimulated political debate. The experiment was not appreciated by the government, however, and in February 1956 restrictions were imposed on the Phramane "Hyde Park". However, during this period the Hyde Park Movement Party had evolved, upholding the legacy of the Hyde Park experiment. The party was registered with the authorities on March 21, 1955. When it was formed, the Hyde Park Movement Party was the sole left-wing group represented with parliamentary presence.

The party expressed its aims and orientation in four points; 1. For complete independence and democracy. 2. A state of the people, by the people, and for the people. 3. The people are supreme. 4. United we live, divided we die.

The party had a rather weak organizational structure, and several leading figures left the party to join other political parties.

In late 1956 the Hyde Park Movement Party became one of three parties to form the Socialist Front, a coalition led by Thep Chotinuchit. The Socialist Front favoured a neutralist foreign policy, and called for Thai withdrawal from SEATO.

In the February 1957 parliamentary election, the Hyde Park Movement Party won two seats.
