= 1937 Siamese general election =

- 7 November 1937
- 91 of the 182 seats in the House of Representatives
- Turnout: 40.22% (▼1.23pp)
Party	Seats	+/–
Independents (Khana Ratsadon)	91	+13
This lists parties that won seats. See the complete results below.
Prime Minister before	Prime Minister after
Phahon Phonphayuhasena	Phahon Phonphayuhasena

General elections were held in Siam on 7 November 1937 to elect 91 members of the 182-seat House of Representatives, with the other 91 appointed by King Ananda Mahidol. Unlike the 1933 elections, which had been carried out on an indirect basis, the 1937 elections were direct.

At the time there were no political parties, so all candidates ran as independents. Voter turnout was 40%.

== Background ==
Shortly before the end of the term of the parliament elected in 1933, the second Prime Minister Phraya Phahonphonphayuhasena announced his resignation following questions in the House of Representatives regarding the land purchase of the Crown Property Bureau. However, on 9 August 1937, a royal command through the Board of Regents reappointing Phahonphonphayuhasena.

== Results ==
Party	Votes	%	Seats
Independents			91
Royal appointees			91
Total			182
Total votes	2,462,535	–	
Registered voters/turnout	6,123,239	40.22	
Source: Nohlen et al.

== Aftermath ==
On 21 December Phahonphonphayuhasena received a royal command reappointing him as prime minister. He formed a new cabinet with eighteen members. It was his eighth and final cabinet.
