= 1969 Thai general election =

- 10 February 1969
- All 219 seats in the House of Representatives; 110 seats needed for a majority
- Turnout: 49.16% (▲5.09pp)
Party	Leader	Seats	+/–
UTPP	Thanom Kittikachorn	75	New
Democrat	Seni Pramoj	57	+18
Democratic Front	Paitoon Kreukaew Na Lamphun	7	New
Joint Economic Front	Thep Chotnuchit	4	New
Citizen	Liang Chaiyakal	2	New
Farmer Party	Phra Chuang Kasetsilpakan	1	New
Liberal Democratic	Jarubud Ruangsuwan	1	−4
Independents	–	72	+13
This lists parties that won seats. See the complete results below.
Prime Minister before	Prime Minister after
Thanom Kittikachorn; UTPP	Thanom Kittikachorn; UTPP

General elections were held in Thailand on 10 February 1969. The military-backed United Thai People's Party emerged as the largest party, winning 75 of the 219 seats in the House of Representatives. Voter turnout was 49%. Following the election, 30 of the 72 independents joined the UTPP, giving it a total of 105 seats, whilst 24 formed the Liberal Independent Party. They were the first elections in which a number of members were not appointed by the king.

== Results ==
Party	Votes	%	Seats	+/–
United Thai People's Party			75	New
Democrat Party			57	+18
Democratic Front			7	New
Joint Economic Front			4	New
Citizen Party			2	New
Farmer Party			1	New
Liberal Democratic Party			1	–4
Independents			72	+13
Total			219	+59
Valid votes	6,857,133	94.12		
Invalid/blank votes	428,699	5.88		
Total votes	7,285,832	100.00		
Registered voters/turnout	14,820,180	49.16		
Source: IPU
