= United Thai People's Party =

United Thai People's Party พรรคสหประชาไทย
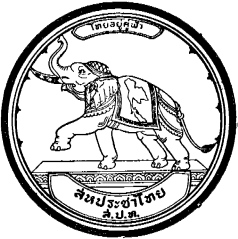
- Leader: Thanom Kittikachorn
- Secretary-General: Dawee Chullasapya
- Founded: 24 October 1968
- Dissolved: 19 November 1971
- Succeeded by: Social Justice Party; Social Action Party (faction)
- Headquarters: Bangkok
- Ideology: Developmentalism; Militarism; National conservatism Anti-communism; Economic populism
- Political position: Right-wing to far-right
- Slogan: "ไทยอยู่คู่ฟ้า" (Thailand remains under the Sky.)
- Anthem: "มาร์ชสหประชาไทย" (United Thai People's March)

United Thai People's Party (Thai: พรรคสหประชาไทย; RTGS: Phak Sahaprachathai) was a political party in Thailand founded on 24 October 1968 was founded by Thanom Kittikachorn and Praphas Charusathien to recruit parliamentary support for their military junta.

In the 1969 Thai general election United Thai People's Party won the most seats in election, resulting in 75 of 219 seats. The party was dissolved during the self-coup of Thanom Kittikachorn and Praphas Charusathien in November 1971 that brought a return to unrestricted military dictatorship.

After the October 1973 popular uprising that toppled the Thanom–Praphas regime, some of the more liberal former members of the United Thai People's Party joined the Social Action Party, while former secretary-general Dawee Chullasapya and his deputy Kris Sivara backed the Social Justice Party.

== Executive Committee of the United Thai People's Party (1968-1971) ==
- Thanom Kittikachorn (Leader)
- Praphas Charusathien (Vice-Leader)
- Pote Sarasin (Vice-Leader)
- Dawee Chullasapya (Secretary-General)
- Kris Sivara (Vice Secretary-General)
- Sawang Senanarong (Vice Secretary-General)
- Pichai Kullavanich (Vice Secretary-General)
- Serm Vinitchaikul (Committee)
- Pong Punnakan (Committee)
- Jitti Navisatean (Committee)
- Tawee Rangkhum (Committee)
- Chuchat Kamphu (Committee)
- Kris Punnagun (Committee)
- Jaroon Chatiaroon (Committee)
- Boonchu Chantarubekkha (Committee)
- Sanga Kittikachorn (Committee)

== United Thai People's Party Speaker ==
Name	Portrait	Periods in Office	Election
Siri Siriyothin		10 February 1969 – 17 November 1971	1969 (10th)

== United Thai People's Party Prime Ministers ==
Name	Portrait	Start Date	End Date	Election
Thanom Kittikachorn		7 March 1969	17 November 1971	1969 (10th)
