= Sanguan Tularak =

Thai politician (1902–1995)

Sanguan Tularaksa (Thai: สงวน ตุลารักษ์; RTGS: Sa-nguan Tularak; June 18, 1902 – May 15, 1995) was a Thai politician and a leading member of the Seri Thai. Sanguan was of Chinese descent and was of Teochew origins.

A longtime Pridi Banomyong acolyte and member of the 1932 coup group, Sanguan was a member of the National Assembly and Chairman of the Bureau of Tobacco Monopoly in the Ministry of Finance.

In 1943 he was made the leader of a delegation sent by the Free Thai leader to establish contacts with the Allies at Chungking. His efforts proved crucial to the securing of British and American support for the underground movement, which would soon receive arms and equipment for effective guerrilla operations.

In 1946 he was appointed ambassador to the Republic of China. He refused to return to Thailand following the coup d'état of 1947, declaring that the new constitution was illegitimate. Sanguan spent the next decade living in China. He returned to Thailand in 1957 and was jailed by the government of Field Marshal Sarit Thanarat. He was released in 1965.

Sanguan was married to Wibun "Bunma" Wimonprapha and had two children named Ramphai (his daughter) and Kraisi (his son). His younger brother was Krachang Tularak.
