= 1933 Siamese general election =

First legislative election in Thai history

- 15 November 1933
- 78 of the 156 seats in the House of Representatives
- Turnout: 41.45%
Party	Seats
Independents (Khana Ratsadon)	78
This lists parties that won seats. See the complete results below.
Prime Minister before	Prime Minister after
Phahon Phonphayuhasena	Phahon Phonphayuhasena

General elections were held in Siam on 15 November 1933 to elect 78 of the 156 members of the House of Representatives, with the other 78 appointed by King Prajadhipok. The elections were held on an indirect basis, with voters electing sub-district representatives between 10 October and 15 November, and the representatives then electing members of parliament on 16 November.

At the time there were no political parties, so all candidates ran as independents. Voter turnout was 41%.

== Results ==
Party	Votes	%	Seats
Independents			78
Royal appointees			78
Total			156
Total votes	1,773,532	–	
Registered voters/turnout	4,278,231	41.45	
Source: Nohlen et al.
