= Economist Party =

Economist Party พรรคเศรษฐกร
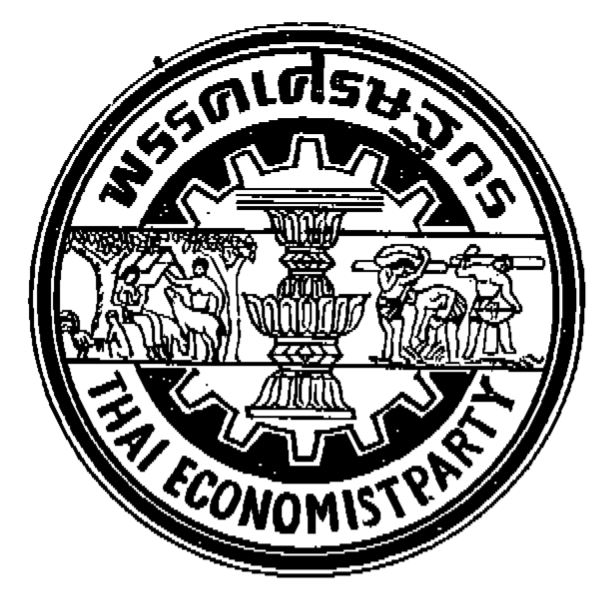
- Chairman: Thep Chotnuchit
- Founded: 4 October 1955
- Dissolved: 6 October 1976
- Headquarters: Thailand
- Ideology: Socialism
- Political position: Left-wing

Economist Party is a political party of Thailand founded on 4 October 1955 by Thep Chotnuchit is leader and Keaw Norapiti is secretary-general. On 26 February 1957 Economist Party won in election with 9 seats. On 15 December 1957 they won with 7 seats decrease from last election 2 seats.
