= Chan Kamwilai =

Thai lyricist, writer of the 1934–1939 national anthem lyrics

Chan Kamwilai wrote the lyrics of the Thai National Anthem in 1934, two years after the anthem was first written by Khun Wichitmatra . These lyrics were used between 1934 and 1939.
