= Phra Chenduriyang =

Thai musician

Phra Chenduriyang (Piti Vādyakara)
- พระเจนดุริยางค์ (ปิติ วาทยะกร)
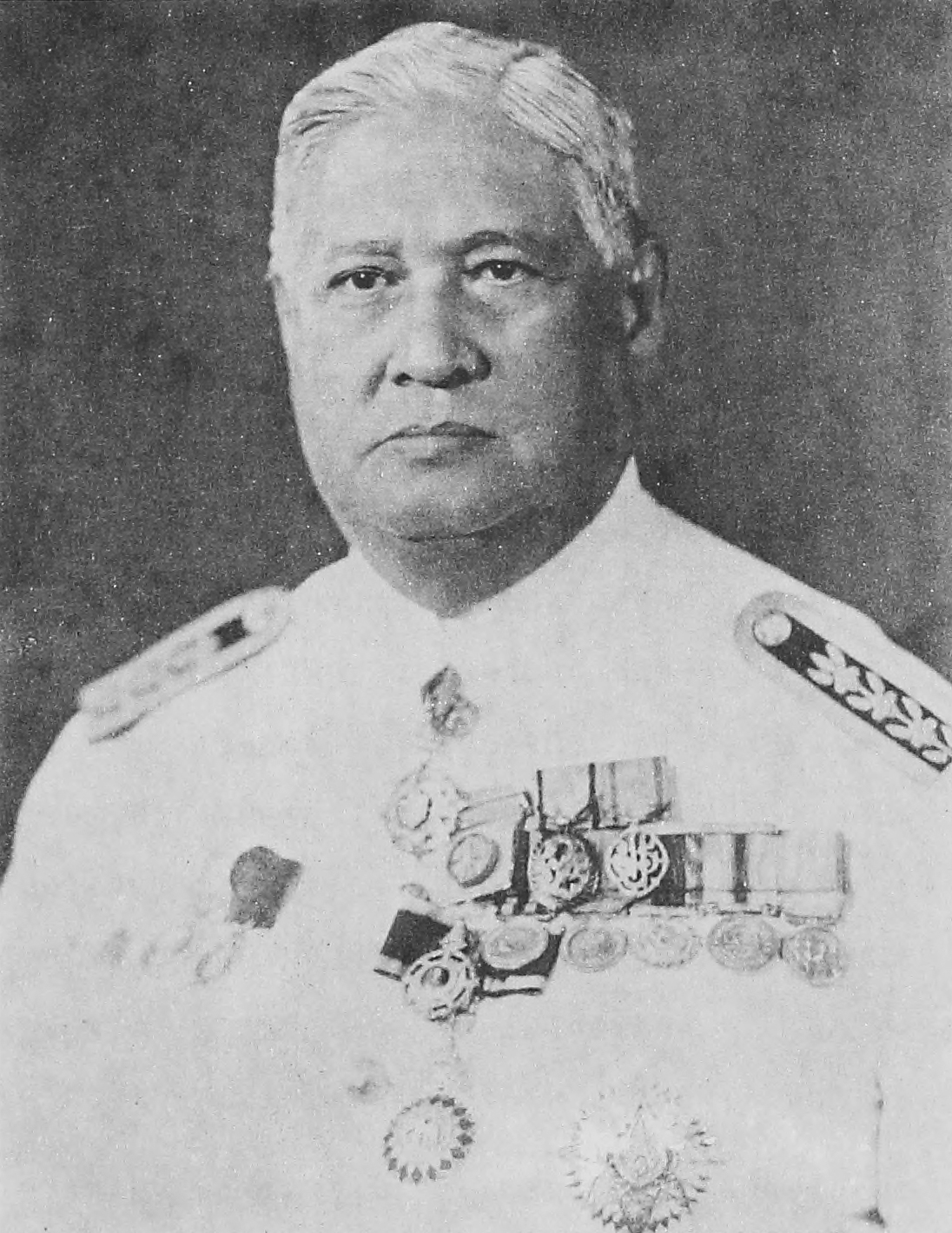
- Born: Peter Feit; July 13, 1883; Bangkok, Siam
- Died: December 25, 1968 (aged 85); Bangkok, Thailand
- Occupations: Music composer; professor
- Spouses: Bertha; Buakham; Lim
- Children: 10
- Parents: Jacob Feit (father); Thong-yu (mother)

Phra Chenduriyang (Piti Vādyakara) (Thai: พระเจนดุริยางค์ (ปิติ วาทยะกร), RTGS: Piti Wathayakon; born as Peter Feit, (July 13, 1883 – December 25, 1968) was a Thai composer, conductor, music professor, collector and arranger. He was the son of a German American immigrant, Jacob Feit, and a Mon mother. However, he never left Thailand and identified himself solely as Thai. He composed the Thai National Anthem.

Feit's father Jacob, who was also a musician, had arrived in Siam (the former name of Thailand) during the reign of King Rama V (Chulalongkorn) and became a trumpet teacher at the royal court. Feit studied piano and western string instruments with his father and at the Assumption College, Bangkok. In 1917, he joined the Royal Entertainment Department and formed the first western-style orchestra in Siam. King Rama VI (Vajiravudh) appointed him deputy director, later director of the "Royal Western string orchestra" and granted him the feudal title and name of Phra Chenduriyang (translating to "skilled with musical instruments"). Phra Chenduriyang was primarily responsible for the spread of Western classical music in Siam, teaching many young Thais. On the other hand, he also collected and notated Thai folk music which had only been passed down orally until that time.

After the Siamese revolution of 1932, the new rulers who called themselves the "People's Party" (Khana Ratsadon) tasked Chenduriyang—having been the royal music advisor to the Thai court—with composing the music for the Thai National Anthem (Phleng Chat). He was reluctant to accept this order as he was a loyal liegeman of the king, but had to relent. Reportedly, the melody came to his mind during a tram ride, and is inspired by Brahms' Symphony No. 1. The corresponding lyrics were written by Khun Wichitmatra His Western orchestra became a core component of the Fine Arts Department, a government agency established by the revolutionaries. In 1939, during Thaification in Thailand, he adopted the Thai name Piti Vādyakara. Between 1940 and 1950 he was a professor of music at the Silpakorn University, Bangkok. Among his students were King-to-be Bhumibol Adulyadej, Eua Sunthornsanan, Wet Sunthonjamon, Sa-nga Arampir and Saman Kanchanaphalin.

Phra Cheduriyang died of heart failure in Bangkok on 25 December 1968, at the age of 85. He had six children and 20 grandchildren.
