= So Sethaputra =

Thai lexicographer and journalist (1904–1970)

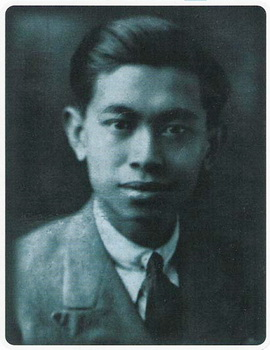
- Born: February 10, 1904; Thonburi
- Died: September 8, 1970 (aged 66); Bangkok
- Occupations: Journalist, lexicographer, politician
- Known for: Compiling the New Model English–Thai Dictionary

So Sethaputra (Thai: สอ เสถบุตร, pronounced [sɔ̌ː sèːt.tʰa.bùt], RTGS: So Setthabut; 10 February 1904 – 8 September 1970) was a Thai writer, journalist, and politician, best known as the compiler of the New Model English–Thai Dictionary, one of the most popular English–Thai dictionaries of the 20th century.

So graduated from England on a royal government scholarship, and worked in the government of King Prajadhipok in last years of absolute monarchy, writing for newspapers on the side. He was implicated in the Boworadet Rebellion in 1933 against the new constitutional government, and became a political prisoner at Bang Kwang, Tarutao and Ko Tao until 1944, during which he compiled his seminal work, manuscripts of which were smuggled out of prison and published serially from 1937 to 1940. Following his release, he briefly entered politics as a representative for Thonburi Province from 1946 to 1947 and as a government minister for three months between 1947 and 1948, after which he returned to writing and publishing. His dictionary continues to be used, and has received renewed interest for the political undertones present in his definitions and usage examples.

== Biography ==
=== Early life and career ===
So was born in Thonburi to the Sreshthaputra family, descendants of wealthy Chinese tax farmers. His father Sawat, however, was more interested in machinery and forfeited the family fortune to marry So's mother Keson and work at the Smith Premier Thai typewriter business of George B. McFarland, who was also publisher of the first English–Thai dictionary.

So excelled academically, and after graduating from Suankularb Wittayalai School, he received the King's Scholarship to study geology and mining in England. He graduated BSc from the University of Manchester in 1925, and returned to work in the Royal Department of Mines and Geology.

So had developed an interest in journalism during his studies, and began submitting articles for the English-language newspapers The Bangkok Times and the Bangkok Daily Mail while in England. After returning to Siam (as Thailand was then known), he continued writing for Daily Mail under the pseudonym Nai Nakorn. His writings caught the attention and approval of King Prajadhipok (Rama VII), who requested that he transfer to the Royal Secretariat Department. So soon became head of the privy council secretariat.

Following the coup that ended absolute monarchy on 24 June 1932, the new government dissolved the royal secretariat and had So transferred to the Comptroller General's Department, then back to the Mines Department. Unhappy with the new government's ideology, So resigned from office that November. Soon after, he joined his cousin Boonrawd's new business as one of the directors of Boonrawd Brewery.

=== Imprisonment ===
In October 1933, a royalist faction staged an attempted coup against the government, now known as the Boworadet Rebellion. The rebels were defeated, and in the ensuing purge of its supporters, the entire editorial board of the Daily Mail—which was critical of the government and had prepared pamphlets supporting the rebellion—were implicated. So was arrested early in November, and sentenced by a tribunal to life imprisonment the following September.

He was held along with other prisoners of the rebellion at Bang Kwang Prison. As political prisoners, they were allowed certain privileges, including their own choice of cellmates and exemption from manual labour. Most of the political prisoners thus dedicated their time to various personal pursuits; many shared their knowledge and learned new skills.

So dedicated his time in prison to writing a dictionary, motivated in part by the need to financially support his widowed mother. His project eventually grew into a considerable operation, with the support of many of his fellow prisoners who helped write, arrange and edit the work. Materials and reference works were smuggled into prison by their visiting families, and manuscripts went out. For a while, So additionally wrote articles for the Bangkok Times, which were hidden between the shells of the water flask his mother brought during visits.

So's dictionary was picked up by Phraya Niphonphotchanat, the owner of The Bangkok Central Books Depot, whom So had worked with in the Royal Secretariat Department, and who officially explained that So had written it before being imprisoned. It was published weekly in three signatures (24 pages) and sold as a subscription, beginning in 1937.

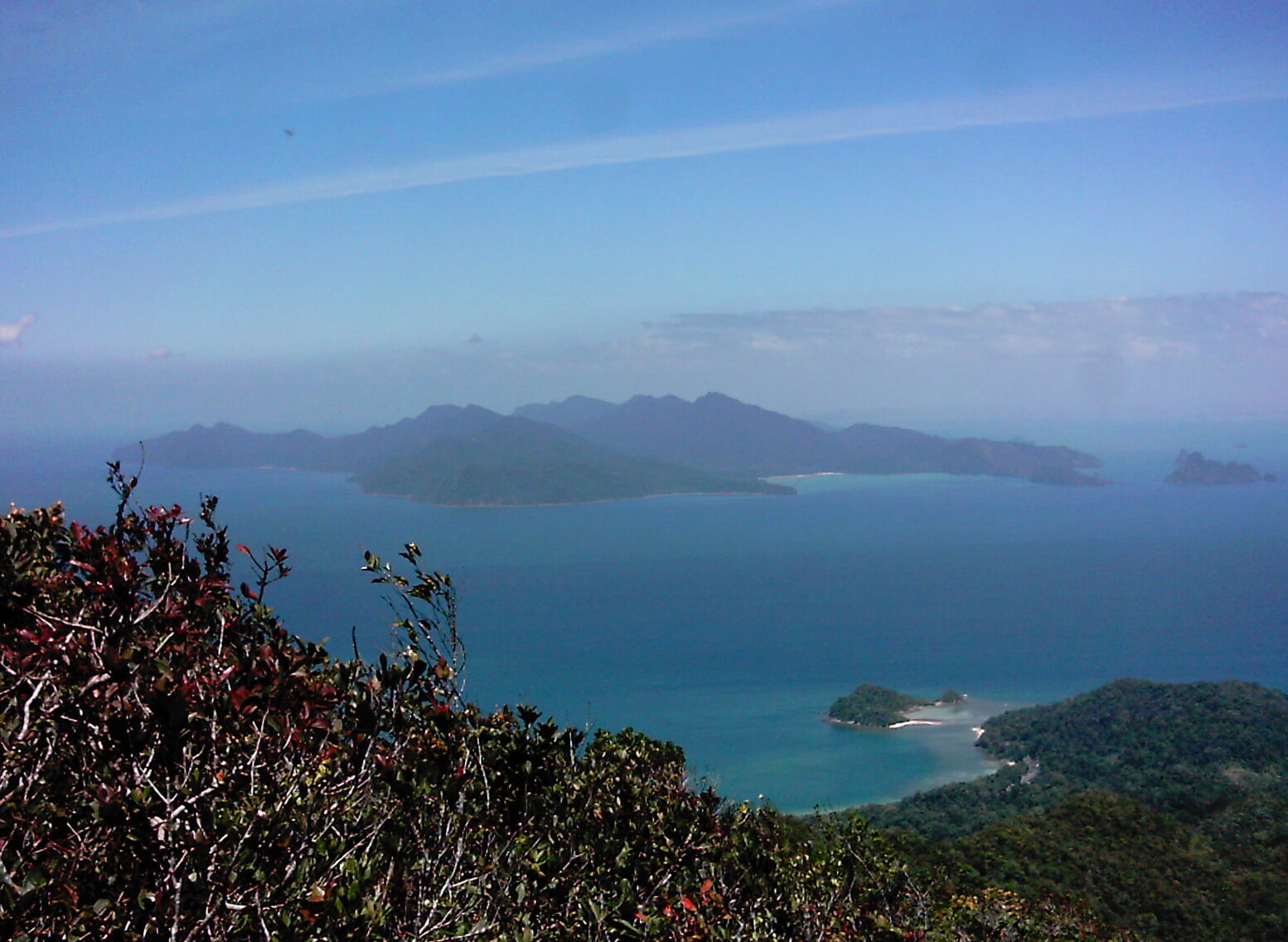
From 1939 to 1943, the prisoners were held on the penal colony of Ko Tarutao, seen here from Langkawi on the Malaysian side of the border.

In 1939, when So's dictionary had reached the letter S, the government of the new fascist prime minister Plaek Phibunsongkhram (Phibun) began a crackdown on political prisoners. The discovery of a makeshift radio So had created prompted the government to relocate all political prisoners to the penal colony of Tarutao, a remote island in the far south of the country. There, the prisoners eventually enjoyed freer conditions and a significant informal economy developed. So finally completed his dictionary the following year, and the final issues, 139–140, were delivered to subscribers in June 1940.

World War II reached Thailand in December 1941, and caused the disruption of supplies to the island. In April 1943, the government had the political prisoners relocated to Ko Tao on the nearer gulf coast. There, they met much harsher conditions and had to forage in the jungle to survive. This went on until August 1944, when Phibun was forced out of power and a royal pardon for all political prisoners was issued under the new Khuang Aphaiwong government.

=== Later career ===
So and the remaining political prisoners were freed in October 1944. So joined the Sri Krung newspaper, and co-founded and served as editor of its English-language arm, Liberty. He briefly entered politics, running and getting elected as a representative of Thonburi Province in the 1946 general election. That parliament was dissolved following the November 1947 coup d'état. However, So was invited to join the resulting third Khuang government as a minister, assisting Prince Sithiporn Kridakara, who was Minister of Agricultural Administration. This was even more short-lived, lasting less than three months before another coup in 1948, after which So quit politics.

So continued writing and established himself as a small publisher. He issued a bilingual weekly magazine called Leader and wrote several books, all aimed at teaching English. He also created a Thai–English dictionary, in addition to updating his English–Thai dictionary, the publishing rights to which he finally sold to Thai Watana Panich in 1969, after plagiarism of his work became too much of a problem to handle by himself.

=== Personal life ===
So had three marriages. He was first briefly married to Ms Nit (นิจ), a distant cousin. From 1937 to 1938, when Chalo Sisarakon was in charge of Bangkwang, the political prisoners were allowed considerable liberty and could even go outside. It was during this time that he met Somphong Phorom (สมพงษ์ โพธิ์ร่ม) and fathered their first son; they had six children together. His third marriage was to Pimpawan Rochanavibhata (พิมพวัลคุ์ โรจนวิภาต), whom he met when she joined the editorial board of Liberty. They married in 1951, and had three children.

Under the Phibun government's attempted spelling reform, So changed the spelling of his surname from เศรษฐบุตร (originally transliterated as Sreshthaputra) to เสถบุตร (Sethaputra, although the pronunciation remained the same). The reform was later repealed, but So retained the simplified spelling for his surname.

So was a car enthusiast. His oldest son Chaiya recalled a DKW, a Lanchester, a Citroen DS 19 and a NSU Ro 80 among the cars he owned, as well as him taking a driving trip up to Mae Sai in the far north at a time when the roads were still unpaved.

So Sethaputra died of a haemorrhagic stroke on 8 or 9 September 1970, aged 66.

== Dictionary ==
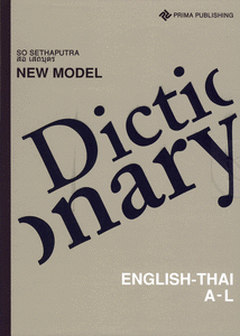
Cover of Prima Publishing's 2009 Library Edition

So's New Model English–Thai Dictionary is one of the best known and established English–Thai dictionaries. David A. Smyth described it as "the most authoritative English–Thai dictionary ... for much of the twentieth century".

The original serialized publication by Bangkok Central Books Depot was titled The New Model English–Siamese Dictionary, after the country's name at the time. The full version, with approximately 4,000 pages bound in two volumes, was termed the Library Edition. After its 1937–1940 release, So worked to create an abridged Desk Edition aimed at students, which was published by Prachachang—a printer of school textbooks—after the war. Both editions went out of print for several years before So and his third wife Pimpawan took it upon themselves to self-publish reissues. Various other formats and pocket-sized editions later followed under Thai Wattana Panich, who was the dictionary's publisher from 1969.

A distinctive feature of So's dictionary is the extensive usage examples he wrote, which serve as a guide to learners but have also gained interest as a reflection of So's life and political leanings as well as the historical context of Thailand's period of political upheaval. His contempt for the military government shows through in many examples, which include "Most oligarchies finally become dictatorships" and "Many crimes have been perpetrated under the guise of democracy." Others offer direct glimpses into his personal life, including the conditions of his imprisonment: "Out of a few soap-boxes I knocked together a desk and a chair."

In 2009, Prima Publishing acquired the publishing rights and released updated editions of the dictionary, significantly revising the Student Edition but retaining much of So's original contributions in the Library Edition.
