= Thai nationalism =

Political ideology

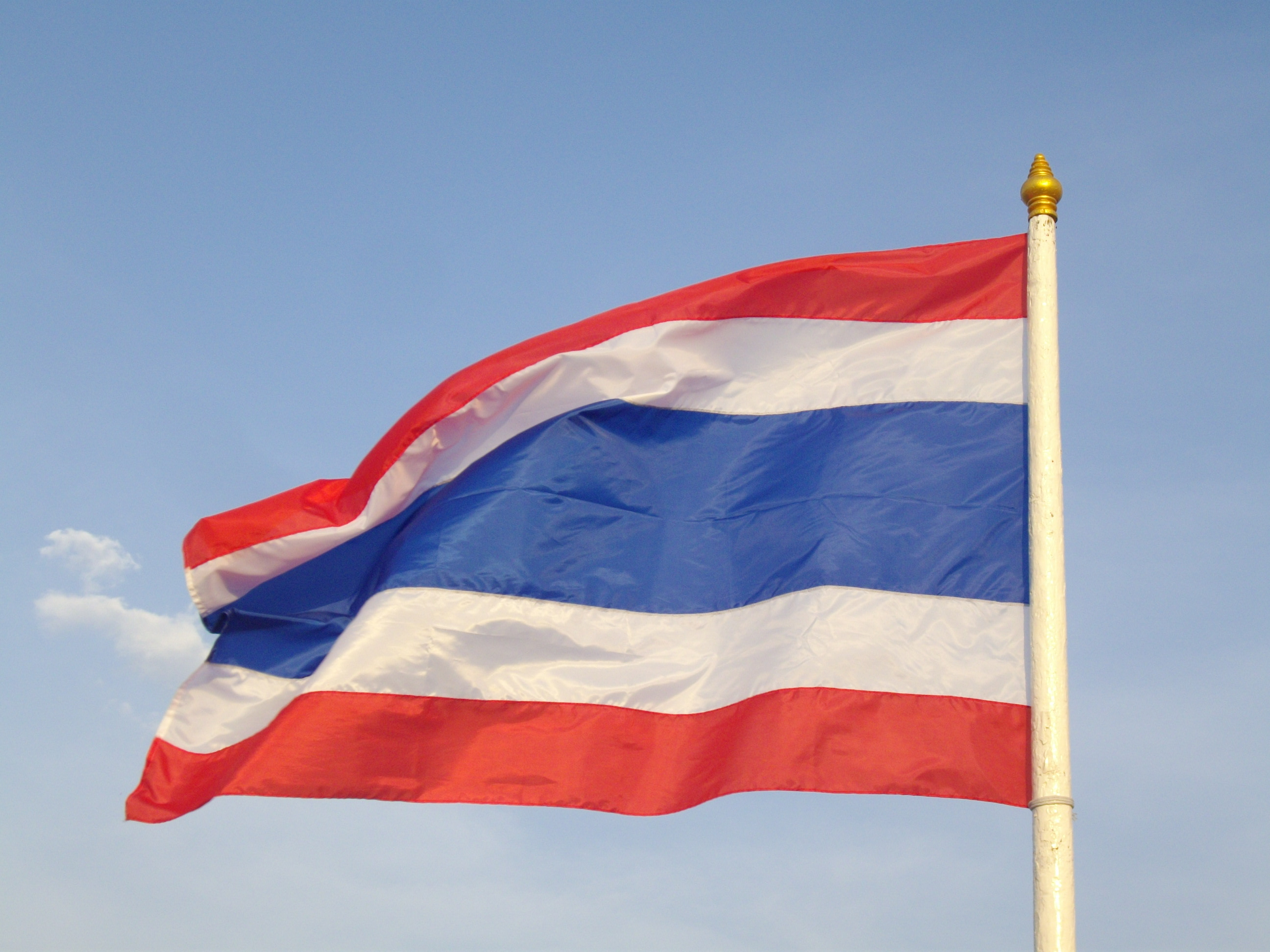
The flag of Thailand is commonly invoked as a nationalist symbol.

Thai nationalism is a political ideology involving the application of nationalism to the political discourse of Thailand. It was first popularized by King Vajiravudh (Rama VI, r. 1910–1925), and was subsequently adopted and adapted by various leading political factions throughout the twentieth century.

== History ==
The origins of Thai nationalist thought derive from the creation of the Thai nation-state in the mid-nineteenth century during the reigns of Vajiravudh's predecessors Mongkut (Rama IV, r. 1851–1868) and Chulalongkorn (Rama V, 1868–1910), whose reforms in response to colonial pressures resulted in the reconceptualization of the kingdom as a modern polity. Vajiravudh, through his numerous writings, promoted nationalism as a distinct ideology, employing historical narratives written by Prince Damrong Rajanubhab and popularizing his views of patriotism. He ascribed the country to a trinity of "nation-religion-monarchy", concepts represented in the national flag adopted in 1917. The Thai nation, in his view, was "a corporate body of people living within the Siam boundary, imbued with a common identity, striving for common goals, and placing public interests ahead of private ones".

Following the bloodless coup which abolished absolute monarchy in 1932 and the abdication of Vajiravudh's successor Prajadhipok (Rama VII) in 1935, the rise to power of prime minister Plaek Phibunsongkhram (Phibun), Thailand's fascist strongman leader, saw the promotion of a new wave of nationalism during his first premiership from 1938 to 1944. Supported by writings by his cultural advisor Luang Wichitwathakan, the country's official name was changed from Siam to Thailand in 1939, and cultural mandates and reforms that aimed to define Thainess were implemented to promote national assimilation of Chinese immigrants and other non-Thai-speaking minorities in a process known as Thaification. An irredentist ideology known as Pan-Thaiism was promoted with the aim of reclaiming lost territories from the French and British, which were briefly realized during World War II but abandoned thereafter.

As national politics shifted to an anti-communist stance during the Cold War, Thai nationalism was again reframed during the prime ministership of Sarit Thanarat, who deposed Phibun in 1957 and became prime minister in 1958. Sarit promoted a revival of the institution of the monarchy, which had fallen in influence since the 1932 revolution. The government promoted the public image of King Bhumibol Adulyadej (Rama IX), whose many development projects aimed to benefit far-flung rural communities, and the King came to be regarded as a unifying figure and symbol of national loyalty. From the 1970s, the motto of nation-religion-monarchy was revived, and the concept of "democracy with the king as head of state" promoted as the pillar of the country's governance.

=== 21st century ===
In 2018 the Thai government created a "soft power" campaign called Thai Niyom ('Thai-ism') (Thai: ไทยนิยม; RTGS: thai niyom) to reinforce the notion of Thai exceptionalism. It includes "12 Core Values", reminiscent of the earlier Thai cultural mandates. The campaign has been criticized by some academics as "mere state propaganda". In 2019, the rise of the Future Forward Party and its intention to change the existing political, economic, and social order by promoting equality, decentralisation, and modernisation, has given rise to accusations by conservative opponents of chung chart (Thai: ชังชาติ; RTGS: chang chat) ('hating the nation' or 'anti-patriotism'), a new variant of "anti-Thainess". Warong Dechgitvigrom, a conservative politician, stated that, "...today, attempts have been made to instil dangerous beliefs in the new generation, which I'd like to call chung chart,..." He defined the unpatriotic as "...people who insult the monarchy, do not support religion, look down on their own culture, speak ill of their own country, and refuse to accept court rulings."

Prime Minister Prayut Chan-o-cha, in early 2020, ordered the Fine Arts Department to film a series of war movies to boost Thai patriotism. The series will depict Thailand's engagements in world and regional wars, such as the Battle of Pork Chop Hill (1953) and the Vietnam War, and Thailand's roles in World Wars I and II. A second set of films will tell stories about the battles with foreign invaders such as the Battle of Ko Chang 1941 during the Franco-Thai War. A third set will focus on local and internal conflicts such as the Khao Kho Battle (1968) and the Romklao Battle (1988). The films will likely be feature films rather than documentaries. The aim of the films is to "whip up a sense of patriotism" to help reduce conflict in society.

== Views ==
The main points of Thai nationalism are:

- A Thailand dominated by ethnic Thai
- The Thai language as the sole official and state language
- No or only limited immigration
- Thailand as a political and economic power factor in Southeast Asia
- Loyalty to the Thai people, the state and the king
- Buddhism as the dominant or even state religion
- Thailand as the representative of all Tai peoples

Since the 2000s, radical Thai nationalism has also been linked to extremist Buddhist groups that act - sometimes violently - against Muslims, especially in the southern provinces. They see Buddhism as a national religion and a defining element of "Thainess".

Dr. Tim Rackett targets the “land of smiles” narrative by noting instances of Thailand’s history of state-sanctioned violence and erasure against the “un-Thai.” This includes the Cold War era napalming of “hill tribes” in Thailand’s north over suspicion of drug and communist ties, and the 1972 killing of some 3,000 suspected communists burnt alive in oil drums. In 1992, anti military/dictatorship protestors were killed during Black May. 12 years later, more than 100 ethnic Malay Muslims were killed in the Kru Ze Mosque attack in April 2004. Six months later, over 70 unarmed protestors suffocated in military vehicles during the Tak Bai incident. In 2010, 90+ unarmed Red Shirt protestors were killed in Bangkok by soldiers.

== Thaification ==
Thaification is the government-led assimilation of all non-Thai (Mon, Khmer and Han Chinese) and is closely linked to Thai nationalism. Sociologist Tim Rackett writes that the government-mandated framework of "Thainess" (khwam pen Thai) creates a hierarchy that devalues and trivializes identities of dark-skinned rural people, particularly the Lao and Khmer of Thailand’s Isan region, relative to Bangkok’s elite.

In 2018, the Thai government launched a new Thaiization project that promotes Thai nationalism and highlights "Thainess" as an important social aspect.

Rackett argues Thai nationalism is fundamentally reactive. He writes that the institution of "Thainess" is defined by contrasting itself with regional and ethnic groups portrayed through negative attributes, like the Lao, Khmer, Burmese, Vietnamese, and Malay. This results in the state reinforcing a centralized Thai identity while contributing to the marginalization of ethnic and religious groups.
