= Thainess =

Conceptual identity of being Thai

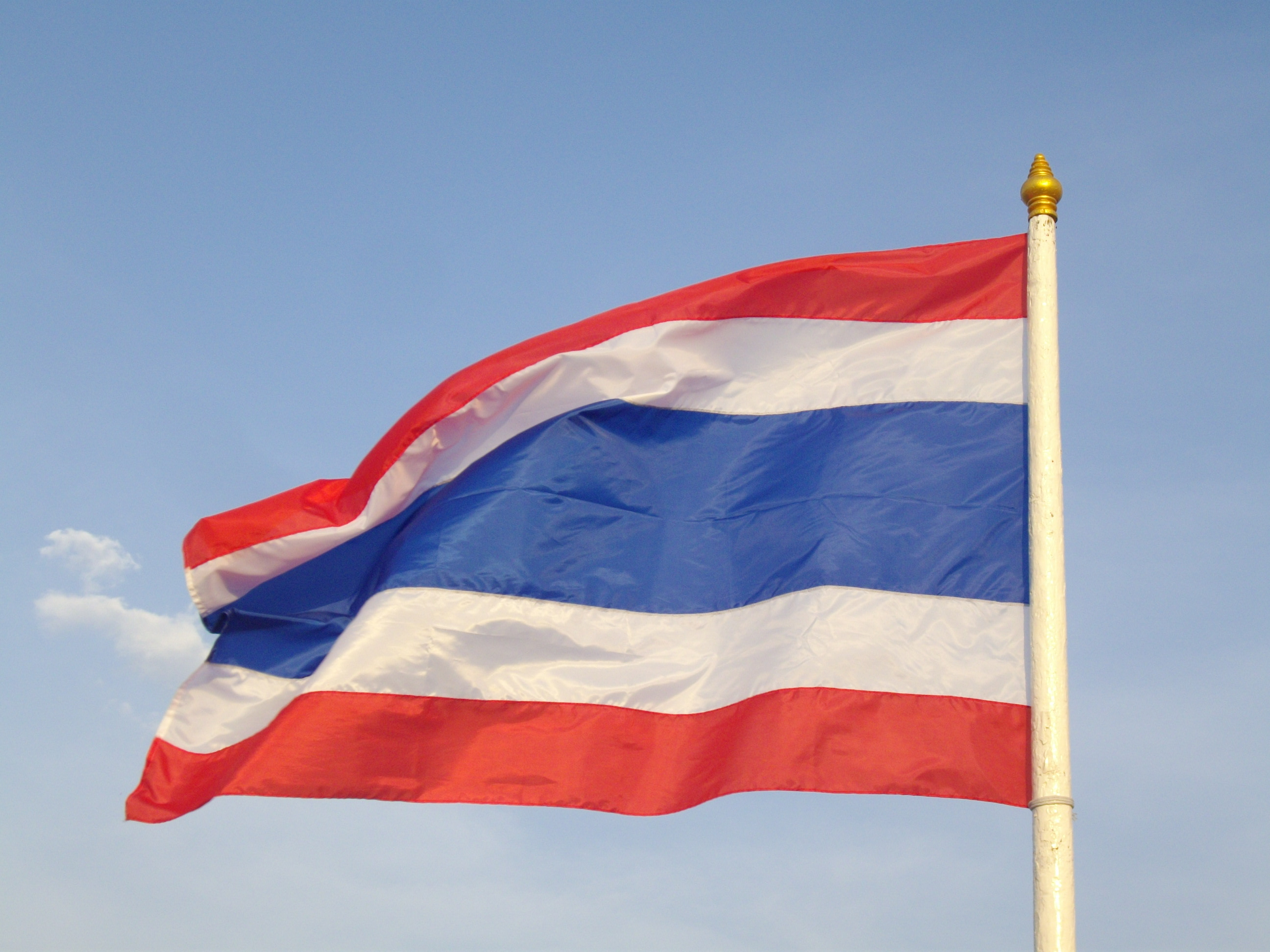
The flag of Thailand is commonly invoked as a symbol of the Thai identity.

Thainess, or the Thai identity (Thai: ความเป็นไทย, RTGS: khwam pen thai), is a conceptual identity regarding the quality of being Thai: characteristics seen as distinctive to the Thai people, Thai culture, and those belonging to Thailand as a whole. It forms the central identity upon which discourses on Thai nationalism have been constructed, with main contributors including King Vajiravudh (Rama VI) during his reign (1910-1925) and Luang Wichitwathakan during the early post-absolute monarchy period (after 1932).

Though poorly defined, it is often expressed as devotion to the three pillars of "nation, religion, king", a concept first popularized by Vajiravudh. It was used as a tool by both the absolute monarchy and the People's Party governments to build political hegemony over the country through the process of Thaification, as well as in the anti-communist effort during the 1960s and the 1970s. It has also become a form of promotional representation by which images of the country are presented to international visitors, especially from the late 20th century. The concept has continued to evolve in various directions, and has been increasingly questioned by scholars since the 1990s and into the 21st century.

Sociologist Tim Rackett writes that the historical enforcement of a centralized "Thainess" model creates an institutionalized socio-political hierarchy that devalued and marginalized dark-skinned ethnic groups, especially the Lao and Khmer of Thailand’s Isan region. He further says Thainess is defined by contrasting from groups portrayed through negative attributes, such as the Lao, Khmer, Farang, Burmese, Vietnamese, and kaek, so only Thainess is seen as positive. The Thai term “kaek,” used to lump South Asians, Malays, and Arabs together based on dark skin, is associated with the evil Buddhist figure Mara. This racializes skin color and religion so Thai Muslims and Malay Muslims are seen as “un-Thai” or inferior citizens.

== See also ==
- Thai cultural mandates
