= Thai exceptionalism =

Belief that Thailand is an exceptional country

Thai exceptionalism is the belief that Thailand is an exceptional country with an exceptional culture. This view is held by many Thais, particularly the elite. Among unique ideas held are that Thailand is the only Southeast Asian country never to be colonized, its perceived elaborate, refined, and esteemed system of monarchy, and its minimal dependence on imported food. Other exceptional claims relate to complexity of naming systems and Thai language and to the assumption that violence is rare despite numerous coups d'état and a long list of massacres.

Thai exceptionalism can also be framed negatively. For example, according to Mechai Viravaidya, Thailand is a nation of lawbreakers .

== Historical context ==
=== Colonialism ===
During the 18th century, Southeast Asia faced colonialism, with European nations expanding their sphere of influence towards Thailand, then known as Siam, and its neighbouring states. From the west, the British conquered India, Burma and Malaya. From the east, the French conquered South Vietnam, Vietnam and claimed to be "protecting" Cambodia, while Siam lost its extraterritorial rights in these areas to the new conquerors. After the Franco-Siamese crisis of 1893, King Chulalongkorn realised the threat of the western colonial powers, and accelerated extensive reforms in the administration, military, economy and society of Siam, transforming the nation from a traditional feudalist structure to a centrally-governed nation state with established borders and modern political institutions. Siam would remain independent to this day, making it the only nation to successfully resist colonialism in Southeast Asia. Nowadays, this is typically presented as a heroic tale of the Chakri Dynasty.

=== Tourism ===
Since the 1960s, Thailand has been a popular tourist spot, due to its stable political atmosphere and the development of Bangkok as a hub of international air transport. The hotel industry and retail industry both expanded rapidly due to high tourist demands. Tourism was soon boosted by the presence of US GIs who arrived during the Vietnam War. During this time, international tourism was becoming the new trend as living standards increased throughout the world and travel became faster and more dependable with the introduction of new technology in the air transport sector.

Nowadays, Thailand is one of the most visited countries in the world, with more tourists coming every year. The government uses Thailand's popularity as a proof that it has a unique culture.

== Criticism ==
Some Thai and western scholars take issue with the notion of Thai Exceptionalism. Some consider it elitist and feel it causes friction between Thais and their neighbours.

=== Non-colonization myths ===
Thai historian Thongchai Winichakul addresses the belief that Thailand was never colonized, saying it’s not actually true as Thailand functioned as a “semi colony” that fell in line with the will of European colonial powers in Southeast Asia and reaped the benfits, and was part of the “colonial economic networks."

=== Education ===
Thai historian Thongchai Winichakul says that Thailand's “Thai-centric” history education has failed and resulted in a superiority complex among Thais, and an ignorance of Thailand's neighbors.

=== State violence ===
Dr. Tim Rackett notes Thailand's "tradition" of protecting the "superiority and purity of the Thai race" through the killing and erasure of the un-Thai. For what he calls "‘Thanato-politics’ of extermination of un-Thai others within," Rackett documents events such as the Cold War era napalming of “hill tribes” in northern Thailand over suspected drug and communist ties, and the 1972 killings of some 3,000 suspected communists burnt alive in oil drums, during which truck engines were revved to conceal screaming. In 1992, anti military/dictatorship protestors were killed during Black May. 12 years later, more than 100 ethnic Malay Muslims were killed in the Kru Ze Mosque attack in April 2004. In October of the same year, more 70 unarmed protestors suffocated in military vehicles during the Tak Bai incident. In 2010, 90+ unarmed Red Shirt protestors were killed in Bangkok streets by soldiers.

=== Isolationism ===
Critics cite nationalistic arrogance as a barrier to ASEAN integration, as well as an impediment to prosperity and stability by way of justifying the unequal social structure of Thai society. In 2018 the Thai government created a "soft power" campaign called Thai Niyom (Thai-ism) (Thai: ไทยนิยม; RTGS: thai niyom) to reinforce the notion of Thai exceptionalism. Some Thai academics label it "mere state propaganda".

On occasion, Thai exceptionalist was used to justify blocking foreign agents. An example is foreign minister Don Poramatwinai's intention to block foreign election observers, stating, "Thais are proud to hold elections without foreign influence".

=== Political dogmatism ===
Numerous events led patriotic Thai netizens to employ Thai exceptionalism to counter criticism from foreigners, mostly Lèse Majesté cases. Sometime Thai exceptionalism was used to dismiss criticism toward authoritarianism, such as Apirat Kongsompong's speech:

Students, scholars and even government officials, no matter where you graduated from, should bear in mind that democracy needs to be adjusted in line with local culture and norms. We are Thai and this is Thai democracy. You have to adapt what you have learned to fit within our country, Thai democracy is the notion of Thais love Thais, and we are united.

Scholars suggest that Apirat's speech is an attack on Piyabutr Saengkanokkul, Future Forward's secretary-general after he attempted to abolish the Junta's constitution.

=== Other Southeast Asian cultures ===
Many scholars suggest that Thai culture has been influenced by foreign cultures. Given that Thailand evolved from Indianized Kingdoms such as the Khmer Empire and Ayutthaya Kingdom, many similarities between Thai culture and neighboring cultures such as Muay Thai and Pradal serey, or Songkran and Thingyan have been highlighted. Thai historian Thongchai Winichakul has said many things viewed as “uniquely Thai” in fact have origins in neighboring countries but not many Thais are aware..

== See also ==
- Thai cultural mandates
- Thaification
