= Bangkok World =

Defunct newspaper in Bangkok, Thailand

- 17 April 1975 issue of Bangkok World
- Type: Daily (except Sunday) newspaper
- Editor: Anusorn Thavisin
- Founded: February 1957
- Ceased publication: 29 August 1987
- Language: English
- Headquarters: Bangkok, Thailand

The Bangkok World was an English-language daily newspaper in Thailand founded in February 1957 whose first editor was Mr. Darrell Berrigan, a United Press correspondent in Asia, and Far East correspondent for The Saturday Evening Post. It replaced the newspaper Liberty, founded by the Thai publishing magnate, Mr. Manit Vasuvat (Thai: นาย มานิต วสุวัต), which was published between 5 September 1945 and 29 December 1956.

From its inception until early spring 1970, the Bangkok World was owned by Ital-Thai, a large construction company, of which General Phao Siyanon, who hired Darrell Berigan in 1957 to become editor of the Bangkok World, was a major shareholder. Ital-Thai sold in 1970 "a large interest in the enterprise" to Time Inc. whose resources enabled the paper to buy news presses and printing equipment. In 1971, the Bangkok Post and the Bangkok World were merged; The Post serving as the morning newspaper and The World as the afternoon paper. The Bangkok World's last issue was published on 29 August 1987. It closed due to financial losses.

A magazine was published on Sundays from 1957 entitled Bangkok World, Sunday Magazine Section. It was merged on 14 April 1968 with Standard International to form Standard Bangkok magazine. On 1 April 1972, the magazine was renamed "Impact".

== See also ==
- Timeline of English-language newspapers published in Thailand
- List of online newspaper archives - Thailand
- Bernard Trink – Author of the popular "Nite Owl" column
