= Luang Saranupraphan =

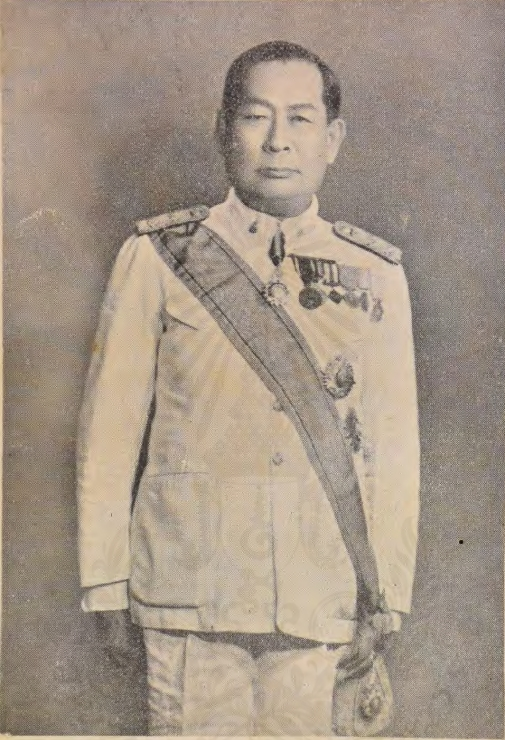
Luang Saranupraphan

Luang Saranupraphan (Nuan Pachinphayak) (Thai: หลวงสารานุประพันธ์ (นวล ปาจิณพยัคฆ์); 24 August 1896 – 14 June 1954) was a Thai writer. He is most known for writing the lyrics of the Thai National Anthem.

Saranupraphan edited the journals Sena sueksa lae phae witthayasat ("Military studies and the spread of science") and Saranukun. His most important novels are Phrae Dam ("Black Satin") and Na Phi ("The Ghost Face").

In 1939, when the name of the country was changed from Siam to Thailand, a competition was launched to create new lyrics, with those by Luang Saranupraphan winning.
