= Sreshthaputra family =

Thai family

The Sreshthaputra family (Thai: เศรษฐบุตร, pronounced [sèːt.tʰa.bùt], RTGS: Setthabut), today also commonly spelled Sethabutra, is a Thai family tracing descent from Phra Prasoetwanit (Po) (พระประเสริฐวานิช (โป้)), a Chinese tax farmer during the reign of King Rama I. The surname was granted by King Vajiravudh (Rama VI) in 1913 to two of his descendents, Phraya Noranetbanchakit (Lat) (พระยานรเนติบัญชากิจ (ลัด)) and Nai Lert. Other notable family members include Phraya Bhirombhakdi (Boonrawd Sreshthaputra, progenitor of the Bhirombhakdi branch of the family) and So Sethaputra, best known as the lexicographer who compiled one of the most popular English–Thai dictionaries. The ancestry is also shared by the Poshyachinda (of the So Heng Tai Mansion) and Pranich families
