= Liberty (Thai newspaper) =

Defunct newspaper in Bangkok, Thailand

- Monday 10 June 1946 issue of Liberty
- Type: Daily (except Sunday) newspaper
- Editor: So Sethaputra
- Founded: 5 September 1945
- Ceased publication: 29 December 1956
- Language: English
- Headquarters: Bangkok, Thailand

The newspaper Liberty was founded by the Thai publishing magnate, Mr. Manit Vasuvat (Thai: นาย มานิต วสุวัต), who was Chair of the Sri Krung Publishing Company. It was published between 5 September 1945 and 29 December 1956. The Bangkok World replaced Liberty in February 1957.

== See also ==
- Timeline of English-language newspapers published in Thailand
- List of online newspaper archives - Thailand
