= Bernard Trink =

American journalist (1931–2020)

Bernard Trink (1931 – 6 October 2020) was a columnist for the Bangkok Post. A native New Yorker, Trink moved to Bangkok in the mid-1960s and taught English at various universities before taking over the "Nite Owl" column in 1966 at the now defunct Bangkok World, an English-language evening newspaper. Trink's popular "Nite Owl" column ran weekly for the next 37 years, covering Bangkok's seedier nighttime entertainment: go-go bars, nightclubs, pubs, and massage parlors. He also wrote restaurant reviews as Friar Tuck and did regular interviews, film and book reviews.

== History ==
Trink first came to Asia as a G.I. during the Korean War. He then worked as a journalist in India, Hong Kong, and Japan before coming to Bangkok.

Originally, Trink's "Nite Owl" was an informative three page illustrated section that appeared in the World every Friday afternoon. When the newspaper was bought out and shut down by the Bangkok Post in the mid-1980s, Trink's column was shortened to just one page and the photographs were eliminated. The Post also restricted what Trink could write about and his column became tamer. However, he continued to have his dedicated fans and when the Bangkok Post tried to stop his column in the late-1990s, a letter-writing campaign persuaded the editor to change his mind. Nevertheless, the column was further reduced to just half of a page.

In December 2003, Trink's column was dropped without fanfare by a new editor, who decided it was time for Trink to go. There was no announcement that it was ending, nor any farewell party for the longtime columnist. The "Nite Owl" column simply stopped being published. Trink still wrote occasional book reviews for the Post and for a time had his own website, but he remained more or less retired after the end of the column.

In his columns, Trink was often critical of the city's seamier, sleazier nightlife and always warned foreign men about becoming romantically involved with bar girls, whom he held in low regard. He also spoke out for women's rights and against child prostitution, but his belief that HIV did not lead to AIDS brought him considerable criticism and may have contributed to the demise of his column.

Trink's columns were known for his "Trinkisms", neologisms or coded references that circumvented the restrictions imposed on writers of a family newspaper. Some of his coinages—such as "TIT" ('This is Thailand'), "which expats still use to explain away anything that baffles them about the country."

Trink is the subject of an unauthorized biography by Jennifer Bliss, called But, I Don't Give a Hoot, published by Post Books in 2000. The book is named after the catch phrase found at the end of each of his columns.

Bernard Trink died aged 89 of a blood infection at Bangkok's King Chulalongkorn Memorial Hospital on 6 October 2020. He is survived by his wife, a son and a daughter.

== See also ==
- Prostitution in Thailand
