= Thai National Anthem =

National anthem of Thailand

Phleng Chat Thai
English: 'Thai National Anthem'
- เพลงชาติไทย
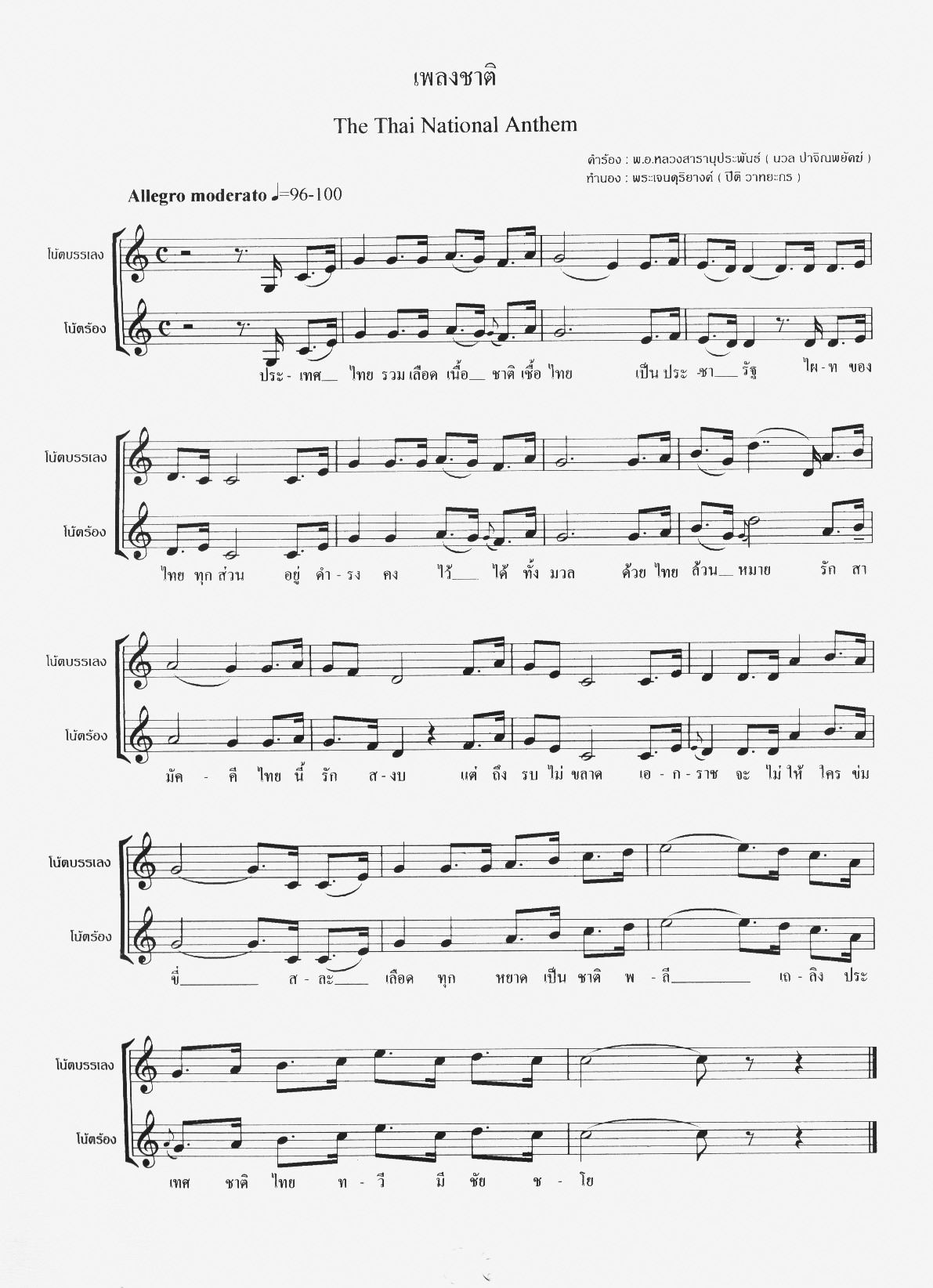
- Official sheet music of "Phleng Chat Thai", published by the National Identity Board, Office of the Prime Minister, in accordance with the Cabinet Resolution dated 30 December 2003
- National anthem of Thailand
- Also known as: เพลงชาติสยาม (English: 'Siamese National Anthem' (Note: 1932–1939))
- Lyrics: Luang Saranupraphan, 1939
- Music: Phra Chenduriyang, 1932
- Adopted: 1934 (original name and lyrics); 1939 (current name and lyrics)
- Readopted: 1949
- Relinquished: 1946
- Preceded by: "Sansoen Phra Barami" (as national anthem)

Audio sample
- United States Navy Band instrumental rendition in C-sharp major.: file; help

The Thai National Anthem, (Note: Thai: เพลงชาติไทย, romanized: Phleng Chat Thai, pronounced [pʰlēːŋ t͡ɕʰâːt̚ tʰāj]) also simply referred to as the National Anthem, (Note: Thai: เพลงชาติ, romanized: Phleng Chat, pronounced [pʰlēːŋ t͡ɕʰâːt̚]) is the national anthem of Thailand. It was officially adopted in its current form on 10 December 1939. It replaced "Sansoen Phra Barami" as the civilian anthem in 1932 (the latter is still used as the royal anthem of Thailand). The melody was composed by Phra Chenduriyang (Peter Feit), and the official lyrics were written by Luang Saranupraphan.

Prior to 1939, when Thailand was internationally known as "Siam", 2 different lyrical versions were used—each one by different authors.

== History ==
=== Origin of the melody ===
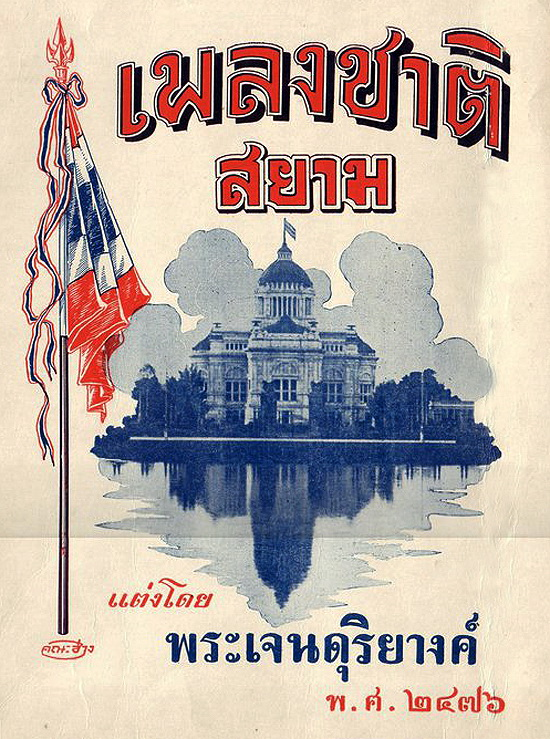
Phleng Chat Siam sheet music (cover page) in 1933.

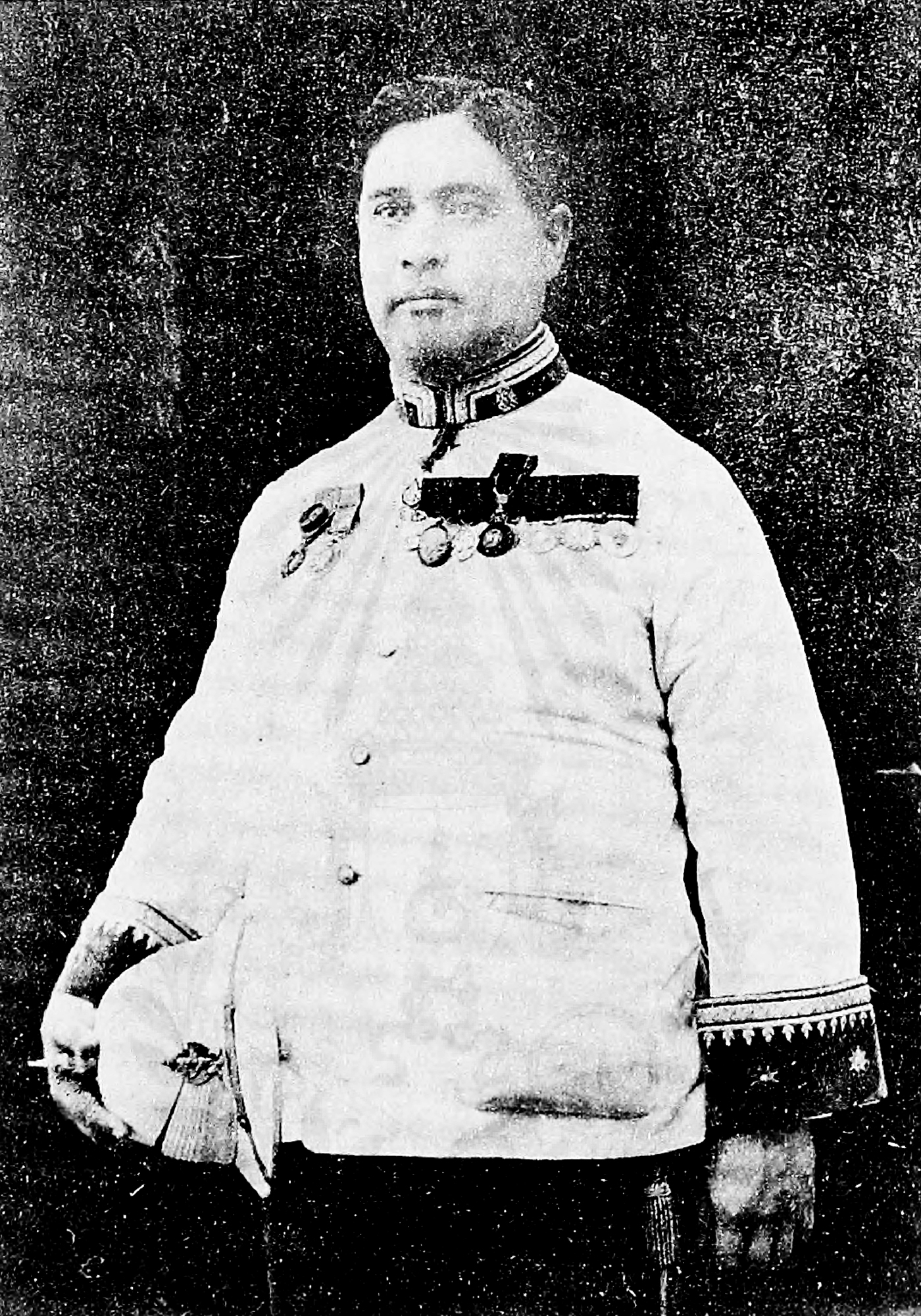
Phra Chenduriyang, composer of the anthem.

1958 vocal rendition in D major
Performed by Thai Fine Arts Department Orchestra

1958 instrumental rendition in D major
Performed by Thai Fine Arts Department Orchestra

According to an autobiography of Phra Chenduriyang (a royal music advisor to the Thai court) written in 1954, he was asked by Luang Nithetkolakit (หลวงนิเทศกลกิจ), his friend in the Royal Siamese Navy, to write a new song for used as the "national anthem of Siam" and this song should be similar to La Marseillaise, the French national anthem. Phra Chenduriyang refused this request because he was a loyal liegeman of the king. Moreover, Sansoen Phra Barami, the Siamese royal anthem, was still used as de facto national anthem of Siam and this request was not made by order of the Siamese government. Although his friend still asked repeatedly, Phra Chenduriyang tried to dodge the request because he knew that new anthem may intricate to some political movement due to rumor of the coup d'état in that time.

About 5 days after the Siamese revolution of 1932 in June, Luang Nithetkolakit now revealed that he was a member of the People's Party. He regretted that the party has no proper song to used as a new anthem for their success revolution, and asked Phra Chenduriyang again to write the new national anthem. The request in this time was made by the new power of the regime in Siam so Phra Chenduriyang must reluctantly composed the anthem. He promised for the new anthem in 7 days and completed it on 6 July 1932 during the tram ride from Tha Tien to Bang Khun Phrom for going to do his regular job at Suan Misakawan, near Dusit Palace. He arranged the new anthem in the tune vaguely similar to the national anthem of Poland, Poland Is Not Yet Lost, for the Royal Siamese Navy Orchestra and also asked to not reveal his name as the composer.

However, after the Royal Siamese Navy Orchestra played the melody of "Siamese national anthem" for the first time at Ananta Samakhom Throne Hall in next week, the newspaper Srikrung had reported about this event and revealed the name of Phra Chenduriyang as the composer. Because of that, Phra Chenduriyang was reprimanded by the Minister of the Palace, for arbitrarily composing the new national anthem. Although the new Prime inister Phraya Manopakornnitithada explained later that it was the idea of him and members of the parliament to make a new national anthem and that the song was still not officially adopted yet, Phra Chenduriyang still received a punishment in October 1932 by being laid off from his job of working as a government official and reentered with half of his former salary (another half of his old salary was his pension deduction).

=== Original lyrics ===
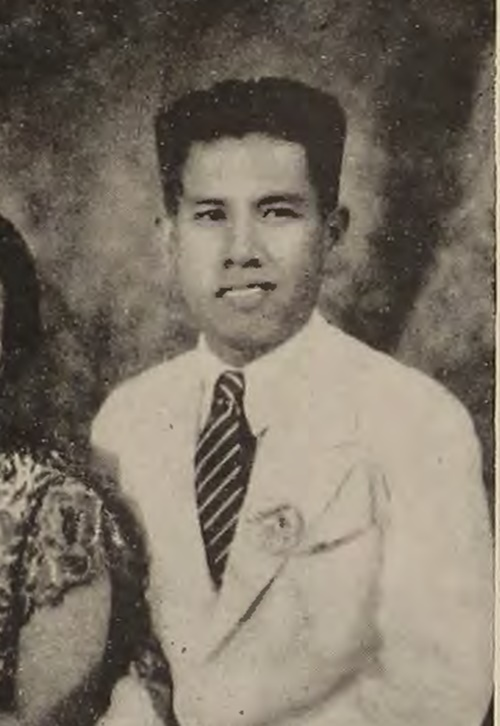
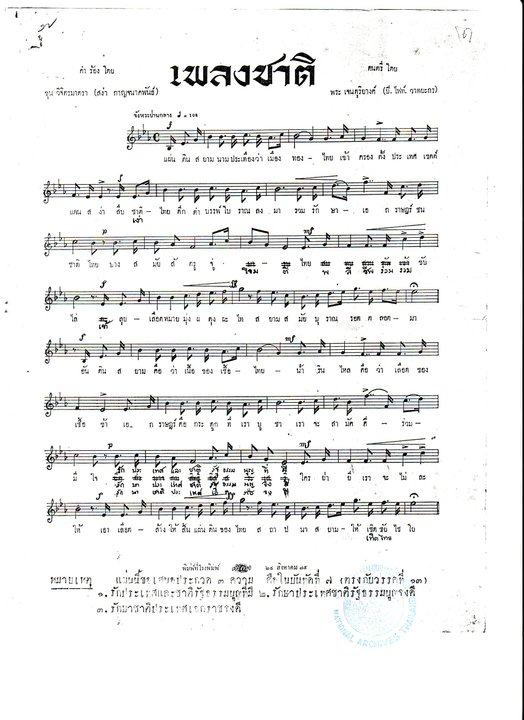
(Left) Khun Wichitmatra (Sa-nga Kanchanakhaphan), author of the original lyrics of Siamese National Anthem. (Right) Sheet music of "Phleng Chat" with the original unofficial lyrics penned by Khun Wichitmatra.

As for the lyrics of the national anthem of, the conspirators of Khana Ratsadon approached Khun Wichitmatra to compose them. The lyrics he composed, titled "Phleng Chat Sayam" (Thai: เพลงชาติสยาม), were two stanzas long, each stanza have 8 verses. It is assumed that they were completed no later than August 29, 1932, as musical notes with lyrics were discovered printed by Srikrung Printing House, which was dated on that day. Although this song was popular with the general public, it was not officially declared as the national anthem and was passed down among Thai people without anyone knowing its clear origin. It appears that there was a copy of Khun Wichitmatra's national anthem lyrics submitted to a competition for the official national anthem lyrics by another people in 1933, claiming that he was the composer.

Due to some lines mentioned about seizing the power (refers to the Siamese revolution of 1932), the original unofficial lyrics were therefore banned by the Siamese government because it was feared that they would incite unrest and lead to a coup against the current government. These lines were revised for the official lyrics of the national anthem competition in 1934 (shown in bold texts).

Thai original

แผ่นดินสยามนามประเทืองว่าเมืองทอง
ไทยเข้าครองตั้งประเทศเขตต์แดนสง่า
**สืบชาติไทยดึกดำบรรพ์โบราณลงมา**
**ร่วมรักษาเอกราษฎร์ชนชาติไทย**
**บางสมัยศัตรูจู่มารบ**
**ไทยสมทบสวนทัพเข้าขับไล่**
**ตะลุยเลือดหมายมุ่งผดุงผะไท**
สยามสมัยบุราณรอดตลอดมา

อันดินสยามคือว่าเนื้อของเชื้อไทย
น้ำรินไหลคือว่าเลือดของเชื้อข้า
**เอกราษฎร์คือกระดูกที่เราบูชา**
เราจะสามัคคีร่วมมีใจ
**ยึดอำนาจกุมสิทธิ์อิสสระเสรี**
ใครย่ำยีเราจะไม่ละให้
เอาเลือดล้างให้สิ้นแผ่นดินของไทย
สถาปนาสยามให้เทอดไทยไชโย

Latin script

Phę̄̀ndin sàyā̌m nām pràthưang wā̂ mưang thǭng
Thai khâo khrǭng tâng pràthē̂t khḕt dę̄n sàngā̀
**Sư̄̀p chā̂t thai dừkdamban bōrān long mā**
**Ruam ráksā̌ ḕkkàrā̂t chòn chā̂t thai**
**Bāng sàmǎi sattrū cū̀ ma rob**
**Thai sòmthòp sûan thàp kâo khàp lâi**
**Tàlui lư̂at mā̌i mûng phàdung phàtai**
Sàyā̌m sàmǎi bùrān rǭ̂t tàlǭ̀t mā

An din sàyām khư̄ wā̂ nứa khǭ̌ng chứa thai
Nā́m rin lǎi khư̄ wā̂ lư̂at khǭ̌ng chứa khā̂
**Ḕkkàrā̂t khư̄ kràˑdùuk thī̂ rao būchā**
Rao cà sā̌mákkī rûam mī chai
**yʉ́t amˑnâat kum sìt ìtsàrà sěeˑrii**
Khrai yâmyī rao cà mâi lá hâi
Ao lư̂at lā́ng hâi sîn phę̄̀ndin khǭ̌ng thai
Sàthā̌pànā sàyā̌m hâi thơ̄̂t thai cháiyō

IPA transcription (Note: See Help:IPA/Thai and Thai language § Phonology.)

[pʰɛ̀ːn.dīn sà.jǎːm nāːm prà.tʰɯ̄ːəŋ wâː mɯ̄ːəŋ tʰɔ̄ːŋ |]
[tʰāj kʰâw kʰrɔ̄ːŋ tâŋ prà.tʰêːt̚ kʰèːt̚ dɛ̄ːn sà.ŋàː ‖]
**[sɯːp̚ tɕʰaːt̚ tʰai dɯ̀k̚.dām.bān bōː.rāːn lōŋ māː |]**
**[ruam rak̚-saː eːk̚ raːt̚ tɕʰon-tɕʰaːt̚ tʰaj ‖]**
**[bāːŋ sà.mǎj sat̚.trūː t͡ɕùː maː rop̚ |]**
**[tʰāj som-tʰop̚ suan tʰap̚ kʰau kʰap̚ lâj ‖]**
**[Ta lūj lɯ̂ːət̚ mǎːj mûŋ pʰà.dūŋ pʰà.tʰāj |]**
[sà.jǎm sà.mǎj bù.rāːn rɔ̂ːt̚ tà.lɔ̀ːt̚ māː ‖]

[ʔān dīn sà.jǎːm kʰɯ̄ː wâː nɯ́ːə kʰɔ̌ːŋ t͡ɕʰɯ́ːə tʰāj |]
[náːm rīn lǎj kʰɯ̄ː wâː nɯ́ːə kʰɔ̌ːŋ t͡ɕʰɯ́ːə kʰâː ‖]
**[ʔèk̚.kà.râːt̚ kʰɯ̄ː kra.duːk tʰîː rāw būː.t͡ɕʰāː |]**
[rāw t͡ɕàʔ sǎː.mák.kʰīː rûːəm mīː t͡ɕāj ‖]
**[jɯt ʔam.naːt kum sit ʔi.sa.ra seː.ri |]**
[kʰrāj jâm.jīː rāw t͡ɕà mâj láʔ hâj ‖]
[ʔāw lɯ̂ət̚ láːŋ hâj sîn pʰɛ̀ːn.dīn kʰɔ̌ːŋ tʰāj |]
[sà.tʰǎː.pà.nāː sà.jǎːm hâj tʰɤ̂ːt̚ tʰāj t͡ɕāj.jōː ‖]

English translation

The Siamese land is renowned as the land of gold.
The Thais have conquered this beautiful land.
**The lineage of Thai people traces back to ancient times.**
**We united to defend the independence of the Thai race.**
**In some eras, our foes have attacked us.**
**But the Thais gathered their forces to suppress the enemies.**
**With blood, we fought for our sovereignty**
And hitherto we have kept Siam alive.

This Siamese land is the bulwark of the Thai race
Our blood runs through this nation's veins.
**Independence is like the bones we honor**
We will rise and stand as one.
**To take power and hold the rights of independence and freedom**
There will be no mercy for those who dishonor it.
We shall massacre them until their last.
To glorify our great Siamese land, horray!

=== The official national anthem competition ===
Melody of "Mahanimit", a proposed siamese national anthem in Thai-style.
Based on a sheet music recorded by Devaprasiddh Pathayakosol, a son of Changwang Thua Pathayakosol

Late-1930s band and vocal recording of "Phleng Chat Siam"
Thai national anthem sung between 1934 and 1939 by Miss Pratum including the Khun Wichitmatra lyrics and the Chan Khamvilai lyrics

In 1934, the Siamese government held a competition for new official national anthem lyrics. The National Anthem Selection Committee was in charge, chaired by Prince Wan Waithayakon, with other members including Phra Riem Wiratchaphak, Phra Chenduriyang, Luang Chamnan Nitikaset, Changwang Thua Pathayakosol, and Mr. Montri Tramote. The competition offered two versions of the national anthem: a Thai-style anthem (composed by adapting traditional Thai music) and a Western-style anthem. The results of the competition were as follows:

==== The Thai-style anthem ====
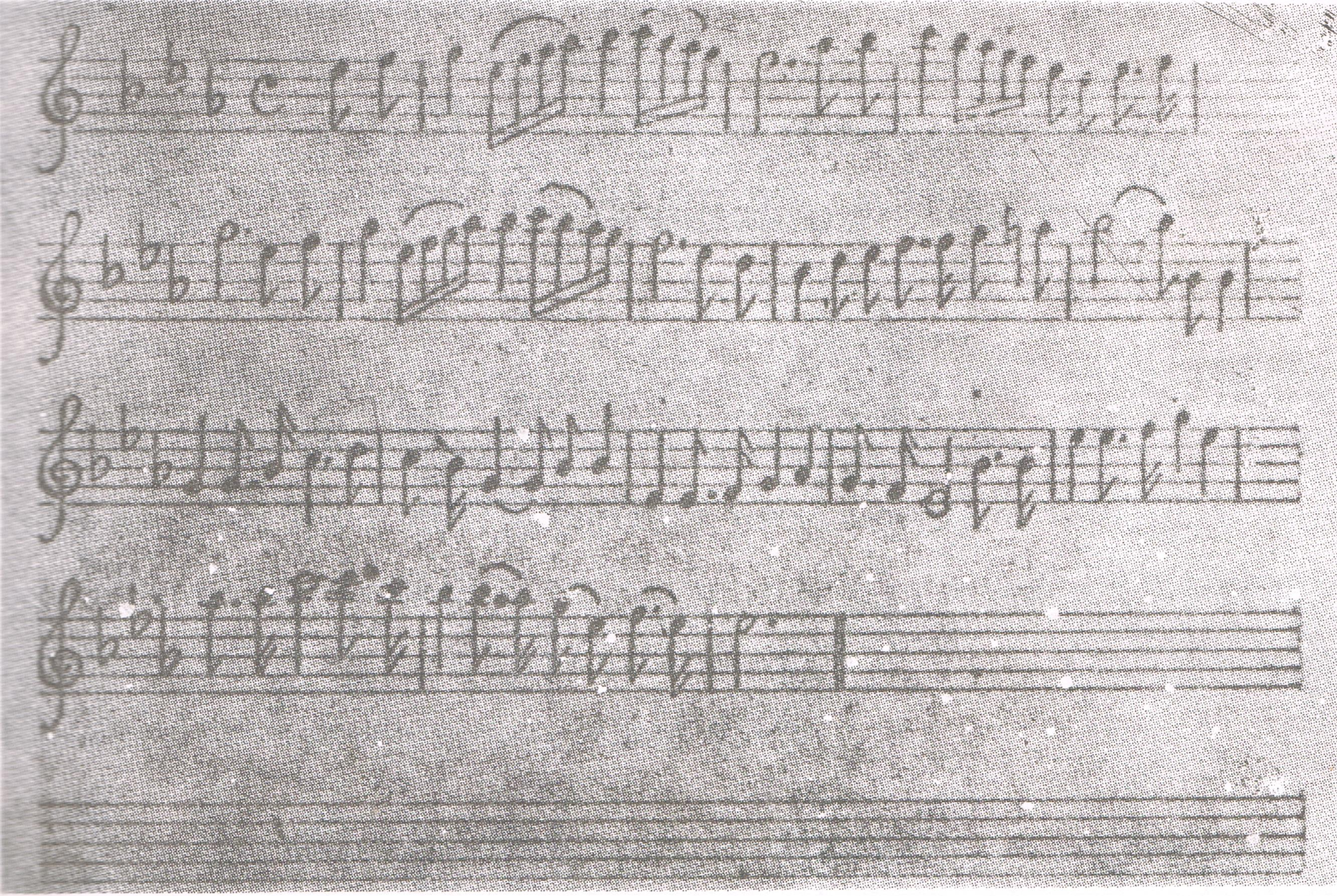
Sheet music for the melody of "Mahanimit," a candidate of Siamese national anthem in Thai-style, composed by Changwang Thua Pathayakosol.

The National Anthem Selection Committee decided that "Mahanimit," composed by Changwang Thua Pathayakosol (จางวางทั่ว พาทยโกศล), was the winning entry. Changwang Thua adapted "Tra Nimit," a significant Thai classical piece, into a Western-style arrangement. "Tra Nimit" is considered a master piece, used in important ceremonies such as teacher-worship ceremonies, to invoke teachers, deities, and blessings. Therefore, its auspicious meaning makes it suitable as the Thai national anthem.

The government broadcast the piece on radio for a period, but when the National Anthem Selection Committee was about to submit the winning entry to the Cabinet for official approval, they met and agreed that the national anthem's sacred nature, combined with the use of two existing songs, would diminish its sacredness. Ultimately, they decided not to submit the chosen Thai-style national anthem to the Cabinet for official approval.

==== The Western-style anthem ====
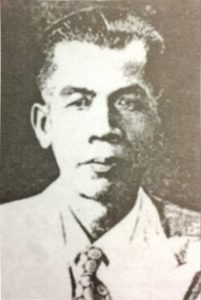
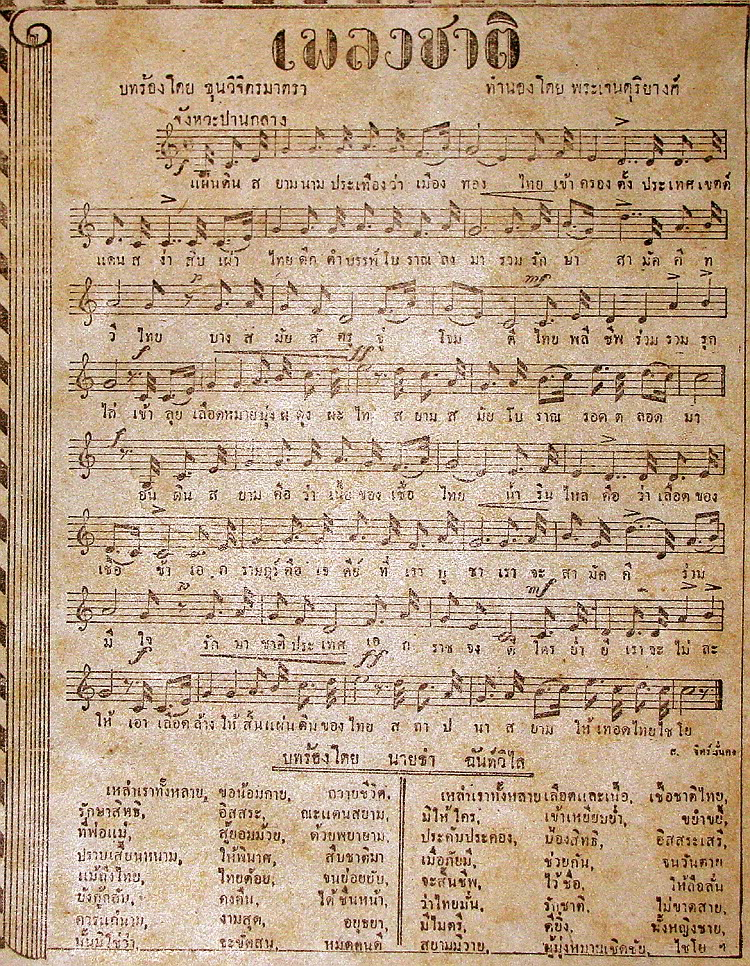
(Left) Chan Khamwilai, author of the 3rd and 4th verses for the lyrics of Siamese National Anthem. (Right) Sheet music of "Phleng Chat" in 1934, in use with the lyrics of Khun Wichitmatra and Chan Khamvilai until 1939.

The National Anthem Selection Committee recommended the melody composed by Phra Chenduriyang as the official national anthem in the Western style. For the lyrics, they selected the winning entry, a revised version by Khun Wichitmatra, and added a version written by second prize winner Mr. Chan Khamwilai (ฉันท์ ขำวิไล). The Cabinet officially approved these lyrics as the official national anthem on August 20, 1934.

Both Khun Wichitmatra and Mr. Chan's lyrics were composed in the eight-line verse form (klon suphap), consisting of four stanzas, each with four lines. Therefore, each entry had 16 lines, bringing the total length of the lyrics to 32 lines. Singing all four stanzas would take approximately 3 minutes and 52 seconds (averaging 35 seconds per section, including the instrumental intro). At that time, most Thais preferred to sing only Khun Wichitmatra's version, and later, the song was no longer sung, remaining only as an instrumental piece.

=== Official lyrics between 1934-1939 ===
==== First and Second stanzas ====
The 1st and 2nd stanzas were written by Khun Wichitmatra. This is a revised version from the original unofficial lyrics in 1932 (shown in bold texts).

Thai original

แผ่นดินสยามนามประเทืองว่าเมืองทอง
ไทยเข้าครองตั้งประเทศเขตต์แดนสง่า
**สืบเผ่าไทยดึกดำบรรพ์โบราณลงมา**
**รวมรักษาสามัคคีทวีไทย**
**บางสมัยศัตรูจู่โจมตี**
**ไทยพลีชีพร่วมรวมรุกไล่**
**เข้าลุยเลือดหมายมุ่งผดุงผะไท**
สยามสมัยบุราณรอดตลอดมา

อันดินสยามคือว่าเนื้อของเชื้อไทย
น้ำรินไหลคือว่าเลือดของเชื้อข้า
**เอกราษฎร์คือเจดีย์ที่เราบูชา**
เราจะสามัคคีร่วมมีใจ
**รักษาชาติประเทศเอกราชจงดี**
ใครย่ำยีเราจะไม่ละให้
เอาเลือดล้างให้สิ้นแผ่นดินของไทย
สถาปนาสยามให้เทอดไทยไชโย

Latin script

Phę̄̀ndin sàyā̌m nām pràthưang wā̂ mưang thǭng
Thai khâo khrǭng tâng pràthē̂t khḕt dę̄n sàngā̀
**Sư̄̀p phào thai dừkdamban bōrān long mā**
**Ruam ráksā̌ sā̌mákkī táwī thai**
**Bāng sàmǎi sattrū cū̀ cōmtī**
**Thai phlī chī̂p rûam ruam rúk lâi**
**Kâo lui lư̂at mā̌i mûng phàdung phàtai**
Sàyā̌m sàmǎi bùrān rǭ̂t tàlǭ̀t mā

An din sàyām khư̄ wā̂ nứa khǭ̌ng chứa thai
Nā́m rin lǎi khư̄ wā̂ lư̂at khǭ̌ng chứa khā̂
**Ḕkkàrā̂t khư̄ cēdī thī̂ rao būchā**
Rao cà sā̌mákkī rûam mī chai
**Ráksā̌ chā̂t pràthē̂t ḕkkàrā̂t cong dī**
Khrai yâmyī rao cà mâi lá hâi
Ao lư̂at lā́ng hâi sîn phę̄̀ndin khǭ̌ng thai
Sàthā̌pànā sàyā̌m hâi thơ̄̂t thai cháiyō

IPA transcription

[pʰɛ̀ːn.dīn sà.jǎːm nāːm prà.tʰɯ̄ːəŋ wâː mɯ̄ːəŋ tʰɔ̄ːŋ |]
[tʰāj kʰâw kʰrɔ̄ːŋ tâŋ prà.tʰêːt̚ kʰèːt̚ dɛ̄ːn sà.ŋàː ‖]
**[sɯ̀ːp̚ pʰàw tʰāj dɯ̀k̚.dām.bān bōː.rāːn lōŋ māː |]**
**[rūːəm rák̚.sǎː sǎː.mák̚.kīː tʰá.wīː tʰāj ‖]**
**[bāːŋ sà.mǎj sat̚.trūː t͡ɕùː t͡ɕōːm.tīː |]**
**[tʰāj pʰlīː t͡ɕʰîːp̚ rûːəm rūːəm rúk̚ lâj ‖]**
**[kʰâw lūj lɯ̂ːət̚ mǎːj mûŋ pʰà.dūŋ pʰà.tʰāj |]**
[sà.jǎm sà.mǎj bù.rāːn rɔ̂ːt̚ tà.lɔ̀ːt̚ māː ‖]

[ʔān dīn sà.jǎːm kʰɯ̄ː wâː nɯ́ːə kʰɔ̌ːŋ t͡ɕʰɯ́ːə tʰāj |]
[náːm rīn lǎj kʰɯ̄ː wâː nɯ́ːə kʰɔ̌ːŋ t͡ɕʰɯ́ːə kʰâː ‖]
**[ʔèk̚.kà.râːt̚ kʰɯ̄ː t͡ɕēː.dīː tʰîː rāw būː.t͡ɕʰāː |]**
[rāw t͡ɕàʔ sǎː.mák.kʰīː rûːəm mīː t͡ɕāj ‖]
**[rák.sǎː t͡ɕʰâːt̚ prà.tʰêːt̚ ʔèk̚.kà.râːt̚ t͡ɕōŋ dīː |]**
[kʰrāj jâm.jīː rāw t͡ɕà mâj láʔ hâj ‖]
[ʔāw lɯ̂ət̚ láːŋ hâj sîn pʰɛ̀ːn.dīn kʰɔ̌ːŋ tʰāj |]
[sà.tʰǎː.pà.nāː sà.jǎːm hâj tʰɤ̂ːt̚ tʰāj t͡ɕāj.jōː ‖]

English translation

Siamese land is renowned as the land of gold.
The Thais have conquered this beautiful land.
**The Thai people have served it ever since the Ancient times.**
**United, we have defended it**
**In some eras, our foes have attacked us.**
**But the Thais sacrificed their lives to save their motherland.**
**With blood, we fought for our sovereignty**
And hitherto we have kept Siam alive.

This Siamese land is the bulwark of the Thai race
Our blood runs through this nation's veins.
**Independence is like a pagoda we honor**
We will rise and stand as one.
**To protect our motherland and sovereignty so dear.**
There will be no mercy for those who dishonor it.
We shall massacre them until their last.
To glorify our great Siamese land, hurrah!

==== Third and Fourth stanzas ====
The 3rd and 4th stanzas were written by Chan Khamwilai.

Thai original

เหล่าเราทั้งหลายขอน้อมกายถวายชีวิต
รักษาสิทธิ์อิสสระณแดนสยาม
ที่พ่อแม่สู้ยอมม้วยด้วยพยายาม
ปราบเสี้ยนหนามให้พินาศสืบชาติมา
แม้ถึงภัยไทยด้อยจนย่อยยับ (Note: This part of the lyric, as officially published in the Royal Thai Government Gazette, volume 51, section 0 ง, dated 26 August 1934, was printed as "แม้ถึงไทยไทยด้อยจนย่อยยับ". This differs from the original handwritten lyrics by Chan Khamvilai, "แม้ถึงภัยไทยด้อยจนย่อยยับ", leading to a confused meaning. Because of this, the article uses the original lyric as written by Chan Khamvilai instead of the version published in the gazette (See Jeamteerasakul, Somsak. ความเป็นมาของเพลงชาติไทยปัจจุบัน. pp. 45-46))
ยังกู้กลับคงคืนได้ชื่นหน้า
ควรแก่นามงามสุดอยุธยา
นั้นมิใช่ว่าจะขัดสนหมดคนดี

เหล่าเราทั้งหลายเลือดและเนื้อเชื้อชาติไทย
มิให้ใครเข้าเหยียบย่ำขยำขยี้
ประคับประคองป้องสิทธิ์อิสสระเสรี
เมื่อภัยมีช่วยกันจนวันตาย
จะสิ้นชีพไว้ชื่อให้ลือลั่น
ว่าไทยมั่นรักชาติไม่ขาดสาย
มีไมตรีดียิ่งทั้งหญิงทั้งชาย
สยามมิวายผู้มุ่งหมายเชิดชัยไชโย

Latin script

Lào rao tháng lā̌i khǭ̌ nǭ́m kāi thàwǎi chīwít
Râksā̌ sìt ìtsàrà ná dę̄n sàyā̌m
Thī̂ phǭ̂ mę̄̂ sū̂ yǭm múai dûai pháyāyām
Prā̀p sîan nā̌m hâi phínā̂t sư̄̀p chā̂t mā
Mę̄́ thư̌ng phai thai dǭ̂i con yǭ̂i yáp
Yang kū̂ klàp khong khưn dâi cư̄̂n nā̂
Khuan kę̄̀ nām gām sùt àyúttháyā
Nán mí chái wā̂ cà khàt sǒn mòt khon dī

Lào rao tháng lā̌i lư̂at lę́ nứa chứa chā̂t thai
Mí hâi khrai khâo yìap yâm khàyǎm khàyī̌
Pràkháp pràkhǭng pǭ̂ng sìt ìtsàrà sē̂rī
Mư̂a phai mī chûai kan con wan tāi
Cà sîn chī̂p wái chư̄̂ hâi lư̄ lân
Wā̂ thai mǎn rák chā̂t mâi khàt sā̌i
Mī maitrī dī yîng tháng yîng tháng chāi
Sàyā̌m mí wāi phū̂ mûng mā̌i chơ̄̂t chai chaiyō

IPA transcription

[làw rāw tʰáŋ lǎːj kʰɔ̌ː nɔ́ːm kāːj tʰà.wǎj t͡ɕʰīː.wít̚ |]
[râk̚.sǎː sìt̚ ʔìt̚.sà.ràʔ náʔ dɛ̄ːn sà.jǎːm ‖]
[tʰîː pʰɔ̂ː mɛ̂ː sûː jɔ̄ːm múəj dûəj pʰá.jāː.jāːm |]
[pràːp̚ sîːən.nǎːm hâj pʰí.nâːt̚ sɯ̀ːp̚ t͡ɕʰâːt̚ māː ‖]
[mɛ́ː tʰɯ̌ŋ pʰāj tʰāj dɔ̂ːj t͡ɕōn jɔ̂ːj jáp̚ |]
[jāŋ kûː klàp̚ kʰōŋ kʰɯ̄ːn dâj t͡ɕɯ̂ːn nâː ‖]
[kʰūːən kɛ̀ː nāːm ŋāːm sùt̚ ʔà.jút̚.tʰá.jaː |]
[nán míʔ t͡ɕʰáj wâː t͡ɕàʔ kʰàt̚ sǒn mòt̚ kʰōn.dīː ‖]

[làw rāw tʰáŋ lǎːj lɯ̂ːət̚ lɛ́ nɯ́ːə t͡ɕʰɯ́ːə t͡ɕhâːt̚ tʰāj |]
[míʔ hâj kʰrāj kʰâw jìːəp̚ jâm kʰà.jǎm kʰà.jǐː ‖]
[prà.kʰáp̚ prà.kʰɔ̄ːŋ pɔ̂ːŋ sìt ʔìt.sà.ràʔ sêː.riː |]
[mɯ̂ːə pʰāj mīː t͡ɕʰûəj kān t͡ɕōn wān tāːj ‖]
[t͡ɕàʔ sîn t͡ɕʰîːp̚ wáj t͡ɕʰɯ̂ː hâj lɯ̄ː lân |]
[wâː tʰāj mǎn rák̚ t͡ɕʰâːt̚ mâj kʰàt̚ sǎːj ‖]
[mīː māj.trīː dīː jîng tʰáŋ jîŋ tʰáŋ t͡ɕʰāːj |]
[sà.jǎːm míʔ wāːj phûː mûŋ mǎːj t͡ɕʰɤ̂ːt̚ t͡ɕʰāj t͡ɕʰāj.jōː ‖]

English translation

Let us all sacrifice our lives
To maintain the rights to freedom the land of Siam
That the ancestors tried to fight until their death
Eliminate the enemies of Thailand to perish!
Even though the Thai disaster is inferior
But still able to restore the independence back
It is an honor to the beautiful Ayutthaya
That is not an end to good people!

All of us, we are of Thai blood
Doesn't allow anyone to oppress us
Protect rights and freedom
When disaster helped each other until the day of death!
If we die, the name will be spread
That Thailand is firmly in love with the nation
Have great friendship for both men and women
The glorious Siam will never be lost, Hurrah!

=== Short instrumental version ===
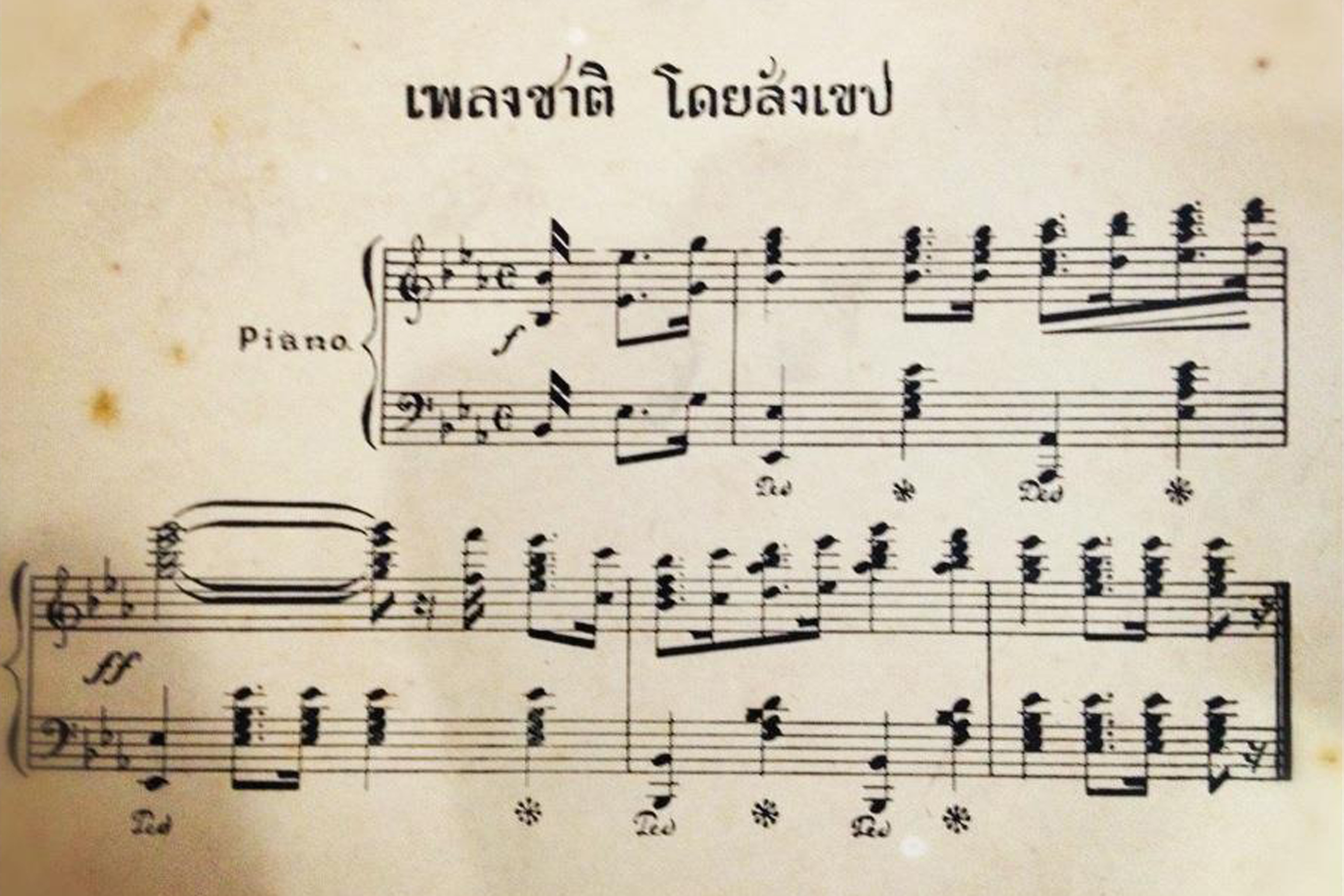
Sheet music of the short instrumental version of Siamese National Anthem

Short instrumental version of Siamese National Anthem, recorded in 1935.
Performed by the Royal Siamese Navy Orchestra.

In 1935, the government of Phraya Phahonphonphayuhasena issued regulations regarding the performance of the Royal Anthem and National Anthem, dated February 4, 1935 (effective February 15 of the same year). These regulations stipulated two versions of the performance: a full-length version and a shortened version. For the National Anthem, the shortened version was to be played at public ceremonies, social gatherings, and especially at regular events. The full-length version was to be used only at major ceremonies.

The abridged version of the national anthem used in this instrumental rendition consists of the last two lines of lyrics, which are typically played as the introduction to the anthem. This short piece is approximately 10 seconds long and does not include any vocal accompaniment.

=== Thai Cultural Revolution ===
Original recording of Thai national anthem (introduction and vocal)
Performed by Thai Fine Art Department Orchestra, recorded in 1939, published by Thailand's Public Relation Department on Rabbit Brand gramophone label.

Original recording of Thai national anthem (full instrument and vocal)
Performed by Thai Fine Art Department Orchestra, recorded in 1939, published by Thailand's Public Relation Department on Rabbit Brand gramophone label.

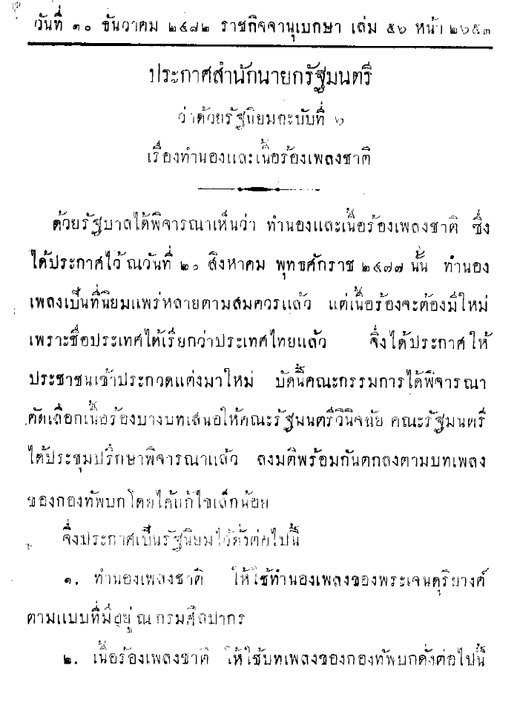
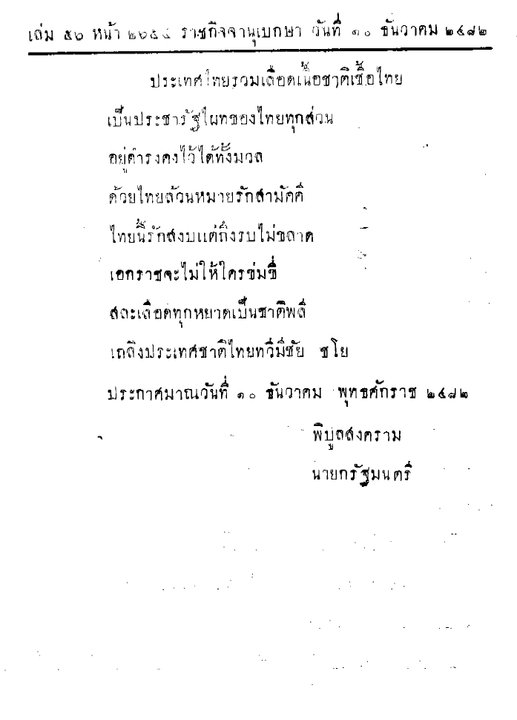
Facsimiles of Thai cultural mandate Volume 6, concerning lyrics of the Thai National Anthem.

In 1939, when the name of the country was changed from Siam to Thailand, a competition was launched to create new lyrics, with those by Luang Saranupraphan winning. According to the condition of this competition, the lyrics were shorten from 16 lines to 8 lines and mentioned the new name of the country but still use the melody composed by Phra Chenduriyang. New lyrics of the Thai national anthem was officially adopted by the Thai cultural mandate Volume 6 on 10 December 1939.

Thai prime minister Plaek Phibunsongkhram ordered the anthem to be played every day at 08:00 and 18:00 (8 AM and 6 PM, UTC+07:00), and ordered the populace to stand up to show respect for the nation. Nowadays, the morning and evening anthems correspond to the hoisting and lowering of the national flags in public areas (e.g. schools, workplaces, public buildings), respectively; hence, the anthem is broadcast by both radio and television channels twice per day from 1980s.

== Periodization ==
Historical national anthem
| Name | Date | Notes |
|---|---|---|
| Sansoen Phra Narai; (Thai: สรรเสริญพระนารายณ์); ('Glorify the King Narai') | 1687–1688 | A piece of music from Ayutthaya Kingdom period that may used in honor of the King of Ayutthaya. |
| Chom Rat Chong Charoen; (Thai: จอมราชจงเจริญ); ('Long Live the Great King') | 1852–1871 | First official documented royal anthem of Siam in Rattanakosin period, may be considered as the first de facto national anthem, introduced by King Mongkut (used the melody of God Save the King) |
| Bulan Loi Luean; (Thai: บุหลันลอยเลื่อน); ('The Floating Moon on the Sky') | 1871–1888 | Royal composition of King Phutthaloetla Naphalai (Rama II) and also his favorite song, used as the new Rattanakosin royal and de facto national anthem. King Chulalongkorn later ordered Mr.Heutsen, a Dutch bandmaster who served in the Royal Siamese Army, to arrange the song in western style for performing by the military band. According to a research of Sugree Charoensuk, an associate professor from Mahidol University, the melody of this anthem may be the same tune with another anthem named Sansoen Suea Pa (Thai: เพลงสรรเสริญเสือป่า; 'Hymn of the Wild Tiger Corps') which was used as the anthem of the Wild Tiger Corps since 1911. |
| Sansoen Phra Barami; (Thai: สรรเสริญพระบารมี); ('Glorify His Prestige') | 1888–1932; royal anthem since 1932 | Rattanakosin (Siam) de facto national anthem. Used as the royal anthem of Siam (later Thailand) only since 1932. |
| Maha Chai; (Thai: มหาชัย); ('Grand Victory') | 1895; provisional national anthem in 1932 | Originally used as an honor music for other members of the royal family and Siamese military unit colours. |
| Maha Nimit; (Thai: มหานิมิตร); ('Grand Vision') | 1934 | A proposed melody which was a candidate for the official Siamese national anthem in Thai-style. Based on a piece of Thai traditional music named "Tra Mimit". The National Anthem Selection Committee in 1934 decided not to submit this song to the Cabinet for official approval. |
| Phleng Chat Siam; (Thai: เพลงชาติสยาม); ('Siamese National Anthem'); Phleng Chat Thai; (Thai: เพลงชาติไทย); ('Thai National Anthem') | 1932–1946; 1949–present | After the Siamese revolution of 1932, the anthem was classified into two factions, Phleng Chat Thai was used as the new national anthem and Sansoen Phra Barami was still used as the royal anthem. In 1939 the country's name was changed from Siam to Thailand, and the words "Siam" in the anthem's lyrics was changed to "Thai". |

== Current official version ==
Thai original

ประเทศไทยรวมเลือดเนื้อชาติเชื้อไทย
เป็นประชารัฐ ไผทของไทยทุกส่วน
อยู่ดำรงคงไว้ได้ทั้งมวล
ด้วยไทยล้วนหมาย รักสามัคคี
ไทยนี้รักสงบ แต่ถึงรบไม่ขลาด
เอกราชจะไม่ให้ใครข่มขี่
สละเลือดทุกหยาดเป็นชาติพลี
เถลิงประเทศชาติไทยทวี มีชัย ชโย

Latin script

Pràthē̂t thai ruam lư̂at nứa chā̂t chứa thai
Pen pràchā rát, phàthai khǫ̌ng thai thúk sùan
Yù damrong khǫ̌ng wái dā̂i tháng muan
Dư̂ai thai lúan mā̌i, rák sǎmákkhī
Thai nī rák sàngòp, tę̀ thư̌ng róp mâi khlā̀t
Ḕkkàrā̂t cà mâi hâi khrai khòm khī̂
Sàlà lư̂at thúk yā̀t pen chā̂t phálī
Thàlơ̄̌ng pràthē̂t chā̂t thai tháwī, mī chai, cháyō!

IPA transcription

[prà.tʰêːt̚ tʰāj rūːə̯m lɯ̂ːə̯t̚ nɯ́ːə̯ t͡ɕʰâːt̚ t͡ɕʰɯ́ːə̯ tʰāj |]
[pēn prà.t͡ɕʰāː rát̚ | pʰà.tʰāj kʰɔ̌ːŋ tʰāj tʰúk̚ sùːə̯n ‖]
[jùː dām.rōŋ kʰōŋ wáj dâːj tʰáŋ mūːə̯n |]
[dûːə̯j tʰāj lúːə̯n mǎːj | rák̚ sǎː.mák̚.kʰīː ‖]
[tʰāj níː rák̚ sà.ŋòp̚ | tɛ̀ː tʰɯ̌ŋ róp̚ mâj kʰlàːt̚ |]
[ʔèːk̚.kà.râːt̚ t͡ɕàʔ mâj hâj kʰrāj kʰòm kʰìː ‖]
[sà.làʔ lɯ̂ːə̯t̚ tʰúk̚ jàːt̚ pēn t͡ɕʰâːt̚ pʰá.līː |]
[tʰà.lɤ̌ːŋ prà.tʰêːt̚ t͡ɕʰâːt̚ tʰāj tʰá.wīː | mīː t͡ɕʰāj | t͡ɕʰá.jōː ‖]

English translation

The flesh and blood of every Thai united,
This land of Thailand sacred to every Thai!
Their sway since days of yore persisted,
Love and unity heart of every Thai!
Though the Thais love peace, dauntlessly we fight,
Our freedom shan't be taken away!
We'll sacrifice ourselves with every nations,
Long live the glorious and victorious Thailand, hooray!

== Customs and laws ==
=== Respect to the anthem ===
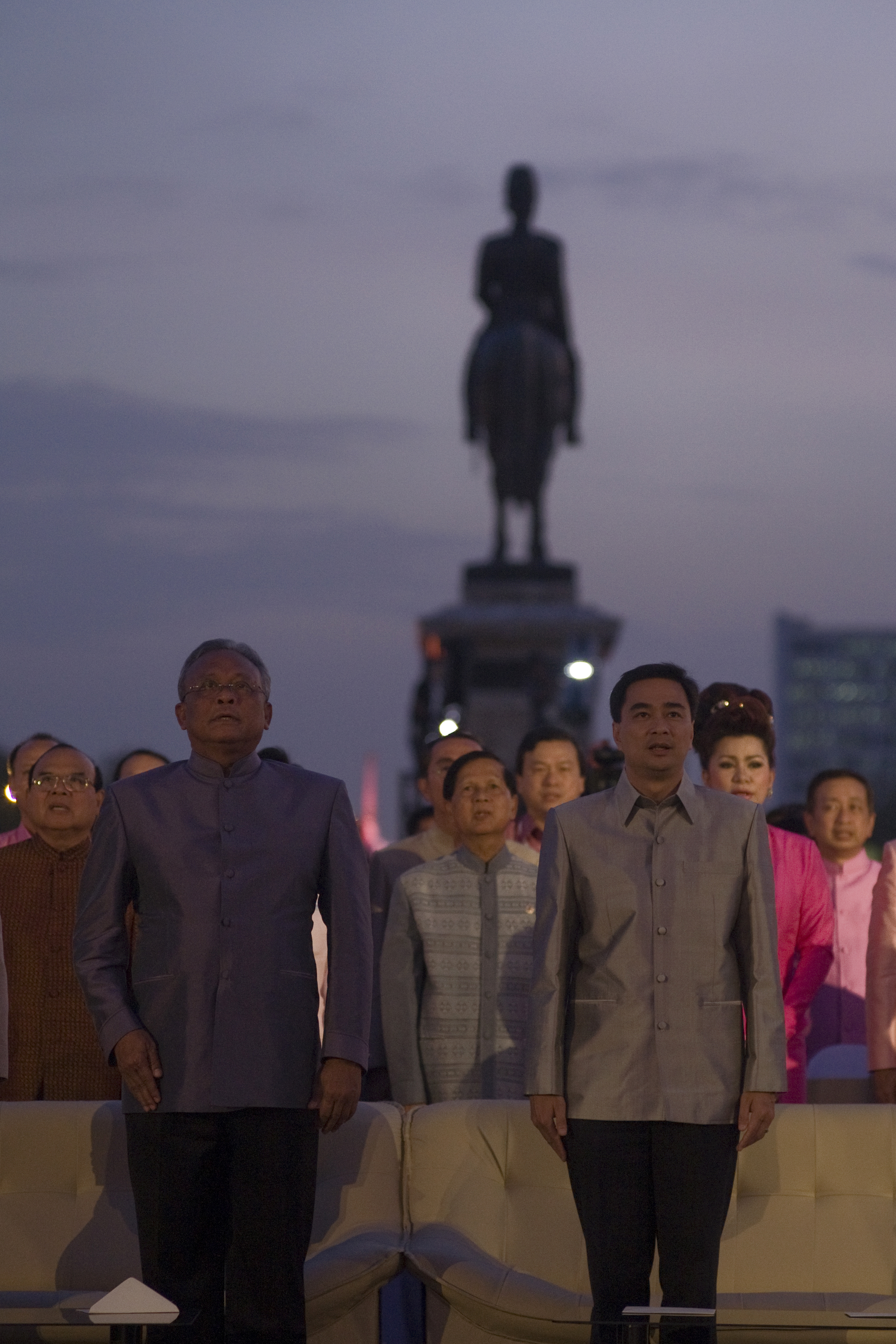
Abhisit Vejjajiva, former prime minister and Suthep Thaugsuban standing and singing the anthem.

It is a common social expectation in Thailand for everyone to stop what they are doing and stand at attention to pay homage to the anthem played, which is placed twice a day, at 08:00 and again at 18:00. During the anthem's course, the national flag is also hoisted up (at 08:00) or down (at 18:00) at applicable flag poles. Should there be any occurrence in which the flag is to be hoisted at half-mast, the flag is to be raised the pole's full height first, before being reduced to half-mast (to hoist during the day) or to fully hoist down (for the night).

Students in school assemble before raised flag and sing the national anthem at 08:00 every school day, and students who are late for this assemble are traditionally marked as late. The National Anthem is also played at government offices, especially in military camps and police stations, and also include public spaces such as local bus stations.

According to the practice dates during the Plaek Phibunsongkhram era, those who did not observe the custom by standing in silence during the anthem were subject to a fine of up to 2,000 baht and not more than one year in prison, but this law has since been abolished. Thus, at present, there is no longer any compulsion to stand upright and respect the national flag. But most people still voluntarily do so. It is nonetheless still mandatory for military and police personnel to assemble and salute the National Flag and Anthem, as mandated by code of conduct.

=== In media outlets ===
Thai Original

ธงชาติและเพลงชาติไทย
เป็นสัญลักษณ์ของความเป็นไทย
เราจงร่วมใจกันยืนตรงเคารพธงชาติ
ด้วยความภาคภูมิใจในเอกราช
และความเสียสละของบรรพบุรุษไทย

English Translation

The Thai National Flag and Anthem
Are the symbols of Thai Identity
Let us, in united volition, rise and show respect to the National Flag
In pride of our independent sovereignty
And the sacrifice of Thai ancestors

In media outlets, right before the national anthem would be played (at designated times), some prelude media are played. These media include a prelude song known as "พม่าประเทศ", or a recital of importance (as listed above), or a time announcement, or any combinations.

Commonly, television stations play only the recital, and radio channels play all of the above media sets.

== See also ==
- "Sansoen Phra Barami", the Thai national anthem officially used before 1932, and still used as the country's royal anthem.
- Thaification
