= Thaification =

Assimilation to Thai culture

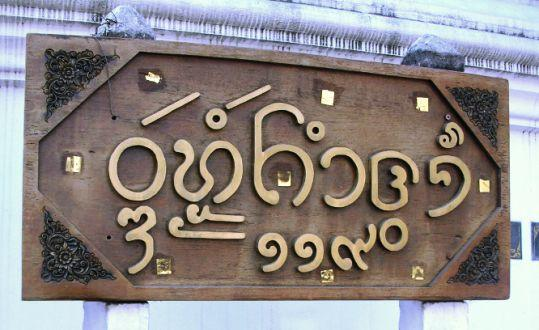
A name board on a wat in Chiang Mai written in the Tai Tham alphabet ("Lan Na alphabet", อักษรธรรมล้านนา). The use of this script was discouraged and the Northern Thai language is now written with the Thai alphabet.

Thaification, or Thai-ization, is the process by which people of different cultural and ethnic origins living in Thailand become assimilated to the country's dominant culture: that of Central Thailand, and later of Bangkok.

Thaification was a step in the creation in the early 20th century of the Thai nation state in which Central Thais occupy a dominant position, as opposed to the historically-multicultural kingdom of Siam. A related term, "Thainess", describes the particular characteristics that distinguish the Thai from others.

== Motives ==
Thaification is a byproduct of the nationalist policies mandated by the Thai state after the June 1933 Siamese coup d'état. The coup leaders, said to be inspired by Western ideas of an exclusive nation state, acted more in accordance with their close German nationalist and anti-democratic counterparts to effect kingdom-wide dominance by the Central Thai culture. Minority-owned businesses, like the traditionally-merchant Thai Chinese were aggressively acquired by the state, which gave preferential contracts to ethnic Central Thais and cooperative ethnic Chinese.

Thai identity was mandated via 12 Thai cultural mandates and reinforced in the heartlands and in rural areas. Central Thailand became economically and politically dominant, and Central Thai, unlike the multilingual Siam, became the state-mandated language of the media, business, education and all state agencies. Central Thai values were successfully inculcated into being perceived as the desirable national values, with increasing proportions of the population identifying as Thai. Central Thai culture, being the culture of wealth and status, made it hugely attractive to a once-diverse population that sought to be identified with nationalist unity.

== Targets ==
The main targets of Thaification were ethnic Chinese and other ethnic groups on the edges of the kingdom, geographically and culturally: the Lao of Isan (อีสาน), the hill tribes of western and northern Thailand, and also Thais who speak the Southern Thai language. There has also been a Thaification of the immigrant Indian and Vietnamese populations. Thaification also targeted the ethnic Malay but was somewhat less successful.

== Policies ==
Thaification by the government can be separated into three sets of policies:

=== Rural development ===
In the first set of policies, the government targeted specific policies and actions at fringe groups. An example of this is the Accelerated Rural Development Programme of 1964, the Isan component of which included the strengthening of allegiance to Bangkok and the rest of the country as one of its objectives.

=== Education ===
The second set of policies consists of policies applied nationally, but that disproportionately affect fringe groups. One example of this is the prescribed use of Central Thai language in schools. This had little or no effect on the central Thais, or the Siamese people, who already used the language as a native but made bilinguals of speakers of Isan in the northeast, of Northern Thai (คำเมือง) in the north and of Pattani Malay (ยาวี) in the south.

Dr. Peter Vail writes that following the Sangha Act of 1902, monks were banned from teaching Khmer and Lao scripts, instead required to teach only Siamese Thai.

Harsher methods were imposed on the Thai Chinese. After the People's Republic of China was founded in 1949, a series of anticommunist Thai military juntas, starting with that of right-wing dictator Plaek Phibunsongkhram, sharply reduced Chinese immigration and prohibited Chinese schools in Thailand. Thai Chinese born after the 1950s had "very limited opportunities to enter Chinese schools". Those Thai Chinese who could afford to study overseas studied English, instead of Mandarin Chinese for economic reasons. As a result, the Chinese in Thailand have "almost totally lost the language of their ancestors" and are gradually losing their Chinese identity.

=== Encouraging Thai nationalism ===
A third set of policies was designed to encourage Thai nationalism in the nation's peoples such as the promotion of the king as a national figurehead and saluting the flag in school and the twice-daily broadcasts of the national anthem (Thai: เพลงชาติ; RTGS: phleng chat) on radio and television at 08:00 and 18:00 as well as in public spaces. Encouraging Thai nationalism had the intended side effect of discouraging other loyalties, such as that to Laos, stemming from the central Thais' fear of Lao cultural and political dominance in the Isan region and that of Malay (Thai: มลายู; RTGS: malayu) in the south.

Thai nationalism also involves historical negationism. Conservative Thai nationalist discourse utilizes the long-debunked “Khom” narrative that asserts a (fabricated) “extinct” race called Khom constructed the Angkorian temples and that modern Khmers of Cambodia are a completely unrelated people.

== See also ==
- Democracy Monument
- Education in Thailand
- History of Isan
- History of Thailand
- Internal colonialism
- Lan Na
- Mandala (political model)
- Monthon
- Socialization
- South Thailand insurgency
- Tai Tham alphabet
- Thai cultural mandates
- Thai exceptionalism
- Thai National Anthem
- Thai nationalism
- Zomia (geography)
