= Thai spelling reform of 1942 =

The Thai spelling reform of 1942 was initiated by the government of Prime Minister Field Marshal Plaek Phibunsongkhram. The prime minister's office announced a simplification of the Thai alphabet on 29 May 1942. The announcement was published in the Royal Gazette on 1 June 1942. The reform was cancelled by the government of Khuang Aphaiwong on 2 August 1944. Following the November 1947 coup, Phibunsongkhram became prime minister for a second time, but did not revive the Thai language reform.

== Proposed simplification of the Thai writing system ==
A significant amount of redundancy of the Thai writing system was retained, in contrast to the simplification undertaken within the Lao language. The changes to simplify Thai spelling were:

- All of วรรค ฎ (i.e., ฎ ฏ ฐ ฑ ฒ ณ), the section of the alphabet corresponding to the Indic retroflex consonants, is gone, being replaced by their corresponding denti-alveolar consonants วรรค ด (ด ต ถ ท ธ น) /d t tʰ n/.
- For /aj/, the vowel ใ, used in twenty specific words, is uniformly replaced with ไ.
- ญ is replaced with ย /j/ in initial position (e.g., ใหญ่ > ไหย่), but retained in final position as /n/ without its "base" (ฐาน).
- Of the three high /s/ consonants, ศ ษ ส, only ส is retained (e.g., ศึกษา > สึกสา).
- Initial /s/ cluster ทร is replaced by ซ (e.g., กระทรวง > กะซวง).
- Leading ho ห, which typically combines with low-class consonants to make high-class consonants, replaces the leading o อ in these four words อย่า อยู่ อย่าง อยาก ( หย่า หยู่ หย่าง หยาก ).
- Many silent consonants that do not add to the pronunciation are eliminated (e.g., จริง > จิง, ศาสตร์ > สาตร).

== See also ==
- Thailand in World War II
- Thai cultural mandates
