= Khun Wichitmatra =

Thai writer

Sa-nga Kanchanakhaphan (Khun Wichitmatra)
- ขุนวิจิตรมาตรา (สง่า กาญจนาคพันธุ์)
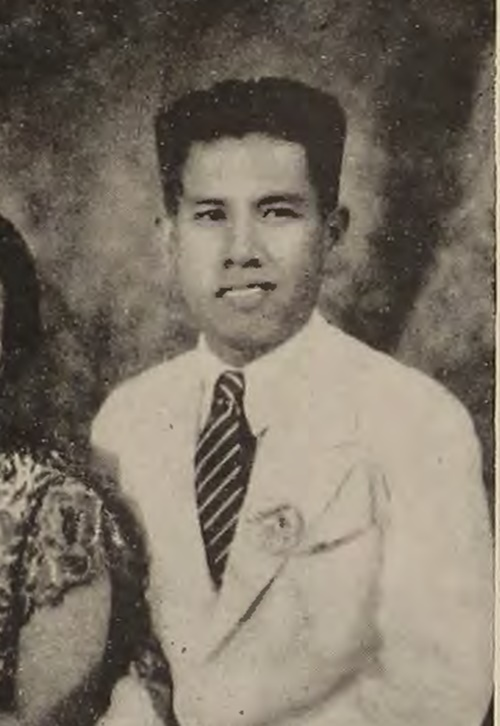
- Born: July 7, 1897; Bang Yi Ruea, Thonburi
- Died: July 2, 1980 (aged 82); Bangkok, Thailand
- Occupation(s): Director, writer, songwriter

Sa-nga Kanchanakhaphan (Note: Thai: สง่า กาญจนาคพันธุ์, RTGS: —Kanchanakkhaphan; also spelled Kanchanakphan, etc.) (7 July 1897 – 2 July 1980), better known by the noble title Khun Wichitmatra, (Note: ขุนวิจิตรมาตรา, RTGS: —Wichitmattra) was a Thai government official, writer, and film director. He was a prominent figure in the development of the ideas of Thai nationalism during the 1920s–1930s. He wrote a large number of plays and non-fiction works, and also directed several of the first sound films in the history of Thai cinema, but his most significant contribution is probably the 1928 book Lak Thai ('origins of the Thai'), a re-imagined account of the history of the Thai people in which he introduced the idea of the Altai Mountains as the original homeland of the Thai race. His work was further built upon by Luang Wichit Wathakan, and developed into the conventional Thai historiography that became taught in schools throughout much of the 20th century. Khun Wichitmatra also wrote the first set of lyrics for the Thai National Anthem, which was used from 1932 until 1939, when the country's name was changed from Siam to Thailand and new lyrics were adopted.
