= Thai cultural mandates =

1939–1942 modernization edicts

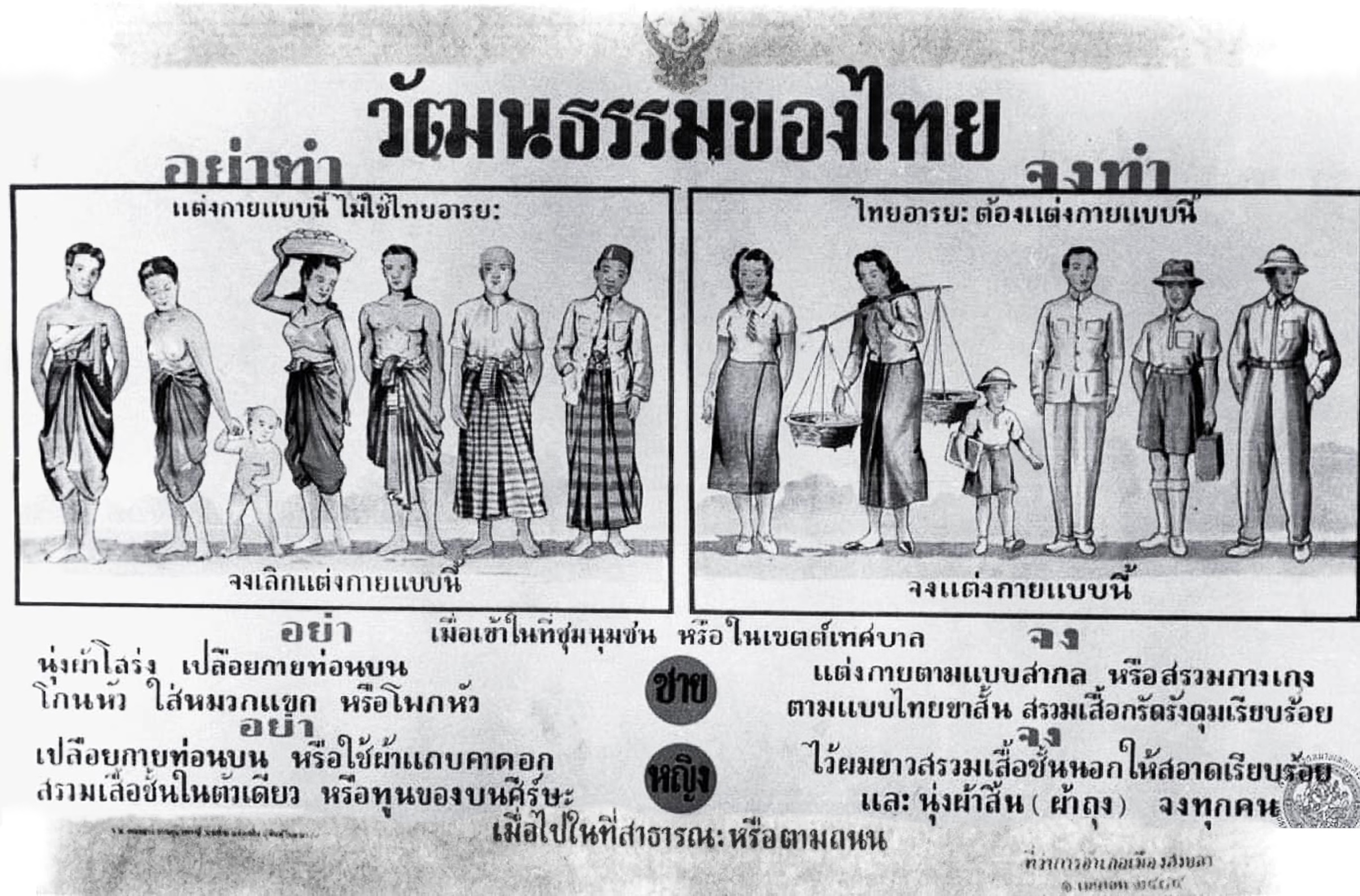
Thai poster from the cultural mandate era demonstrating prohibited dress on the left and proper dress on the right.

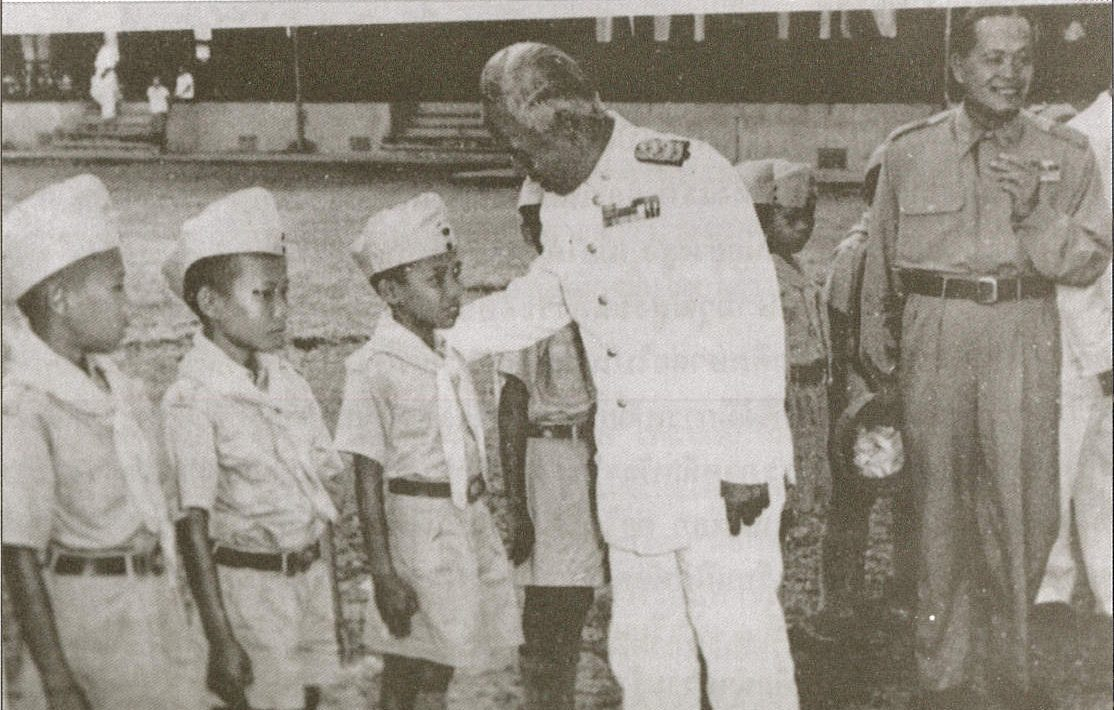
Field Marshal Plaek Phibunsongkhram inspecting Boy Scouts.

The cultural mandates or state decrees (Thai: รัฐนิยม, pronounced [rát.tʰā.ní.jōm]; RTGS: ratthaniyom; lit. 'state fashion' or 'state customs') were a series of twelve edicts issued between 1939 and 1942 by the government of Field Marshal Plaek Phibunsongkhram during his first term as prime minister and military dictator of Thailand. The mandates aimed to create a uniform and "civilized" Thai culture at the time when the country was one of the Axis powers. Many of the mandates' practices were a result of Thailand entering World War II, and they remain in effect.

== Mandate 1 ==
The first mandate, On the name of the country, people and nationality, issued 24 June 1939, cited "public preference" for changing the name of the country. It consisted of one item: "The country, people and nationality are to be called 'Thai'."

One result of this mandate was that organizations with "Siam" in the name were forced to change their names. Well-known examples include the Siam Society, which became the Thailand Research Society, Siam Commercial Bank, renamed Thai Panich Bank, and Siam Cement, which became Thai Cement. After Phibunsongkhram was deposed the first time in 1944, Siam Society reverted both its Thai and English names, while the latter two reverted only the English version of their names.

== Mandate 2 ==
On preventing danger to the nation, issued 3 July 1939, consisted of five items:

1. "Thai people must not engage in any business without considering the benefit and safety of the nation."
2. "Thai people must never reveal anything to foreigners that might damage the nation. These actions are a betrayal of the nation."
3. "Thai people must not act as agent or spokesman for foreigners without considering the benefit of the Thai nation, and must not express opinion or take the side of foreigners in international disputes. These actions are a betrayal of the nation."
4. "Thai people must not secretly purchase land on behalf of foreigners in a way that endangers the nation. These actions are a betrayal of the nation."
5. "When a person has betrayed the nation, it is the duty of Thai people to actively and quickly put a stop to it."

== Mandate 3 ==
On referring to the Thai people, issued 2 August 1939, reinforced Mandate 1 by forcing the public to stop using group names like "northern Thais", "southern Thais", or "Muslim Thais":

1. "Cease referring to Thai people inconsistently with the name of the nationality, or according to the preference of the group."
2. "Use the name 'Thai' to refer to all Thai people, without subdividing them."

== Mandate 4 ==
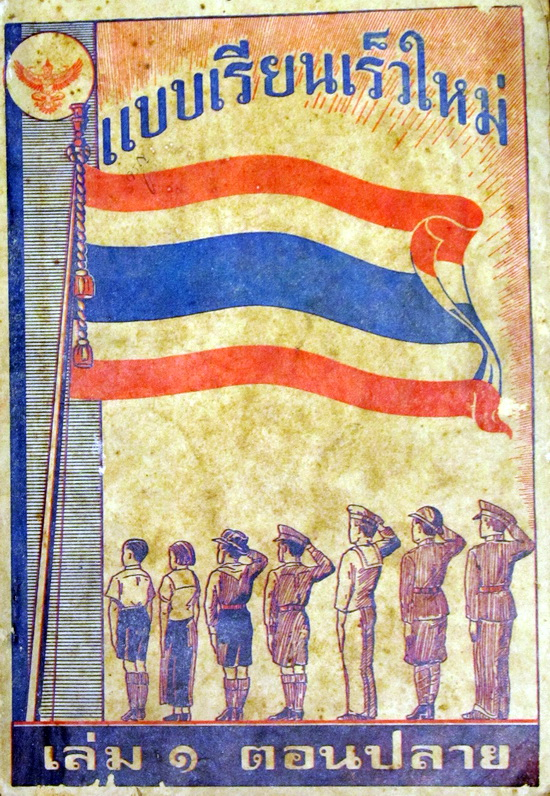
Thai propaganda on honouring the national flag and national anthem.

On honouring the national flag, national anthem, and royal anthem, issued 8 September 1939, consists of five items:

1. "When seeing the national flag raised or lowered according to government custom, or hearing the sound of the salute bugle or whistle, or when the signal is given to raise or lower the flag, honor the flag according to regulation or custom."
2. "When seeing a military flag, naval ensign, Youth Corps flag, or Boy Scout flag in an official procession, or on location at a military, Youth Corps, or Boy Scout site, honor the flag according to regulation or custom."
3. "When the national anthem is heard, whether played for official purposes or as part of any kind of ceremony, participants or attendees will honour the anthem according to regulation or custom."
4. "When the royal anthem is heard, whether played for official purposes, at the theater or any gathering, participants or attendees will honour the royal anthem according to regulation or custom."
5. "When observing any person not paying proper respect as outlined in items 1, 2, 3 and 4, admonish them so as to see the importance of honouring the national flag, national anthem, and royal anthem."

== Mandate 5 ==
On using Thai products, issued 1 November 1939, consisted of five items:

1. "Thai people should make an effort to consume only food made from Thai products."
2. "Thai people should make an effort to wear only clothes made from Thai products."
3. "Thai people should support the agricultural, commercial, industrial, and other vocational efforts of fellow Thais."
4. "Thai people should use and support any public utility established by the government or by Thai people."
5. "Thai people practising agriculture, commerce, industry, or other vocation supported by this mandate must make an effort to maintain standards, improve quality, and run their business honestly."
- See also An invitation to the Thai people to cooperate and properly follow Mandate 5, issued on 2 February 1940.

== Mandate 6 ==
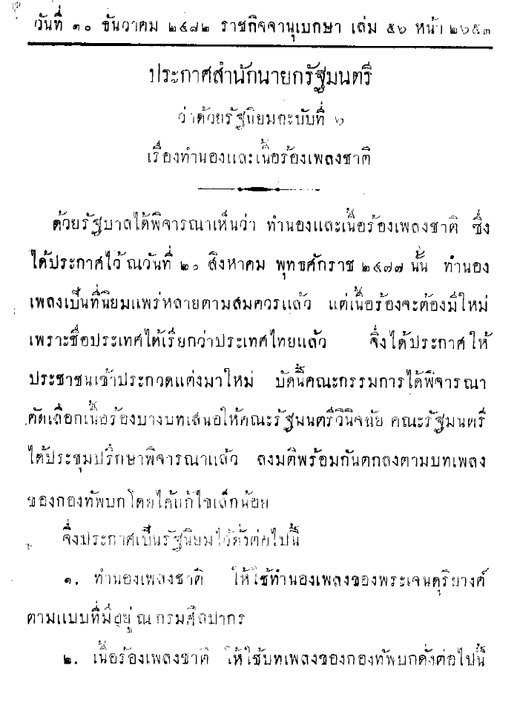
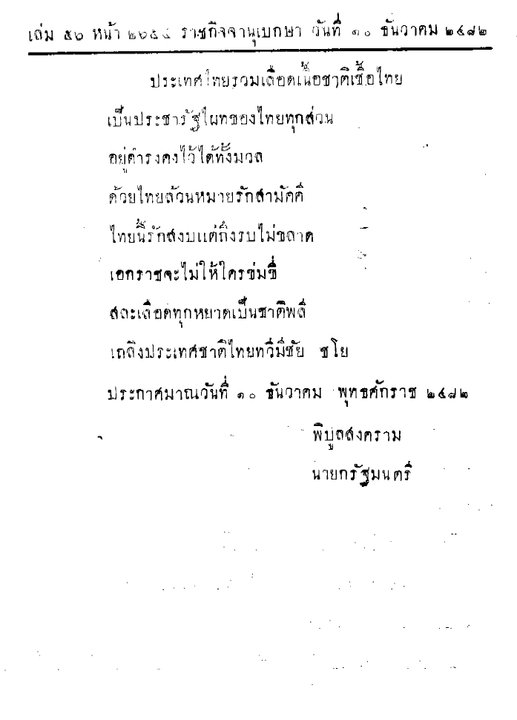
Facsimiles of Thai cultural mandate Volume 6.

On the music and lyrics of the national anthem, issued 10 December 1939, consisted of two items:

1. "The music of the national anthem will be that written by Phra Chenduriyang, and on file at the Fine Arts Department."
2. "The lyrics of the national anthem will be those submitted by the army." (The national anthem is the same today.)

== Mandate 7 ==
Urging the Thai people help build the nation, issued on 21 March 1940,

1. "Every Thai person must help build the nation. Every able bodied person must work at a stable career. Any person without a career is unhelpful to the nation and is not deserving of respect from the Thai people."

== Mandate 8 ==
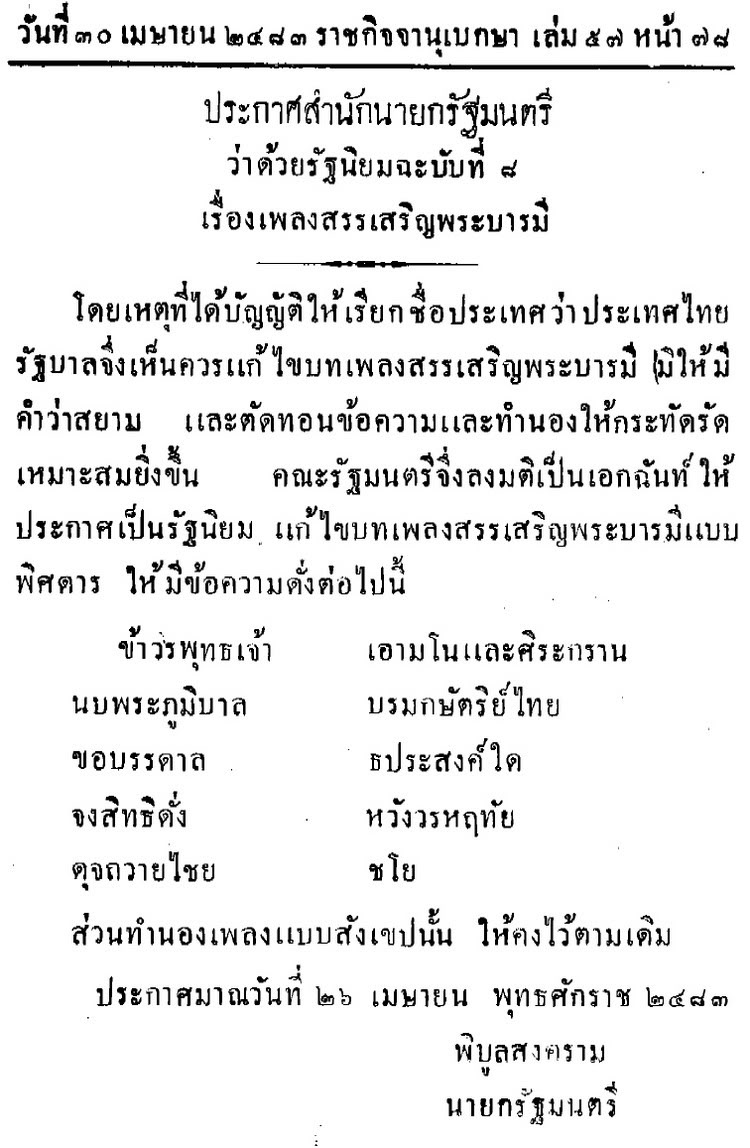
Facsimiles of Thai cultural mandate Volume 8.

On the royal anthem, issued 26 April 1940, shortened the lyrics of the royal anthem, and replaced the word "Siam" with the word "Thai":

ข้าวรพุทธเจ้า (Kha Wora Phutthachao)
เอามโนและศิระกราน (Ao Mano Lae Sira Kran)
นบพระภูมิบาล (Nop Phra Phummiban)
บรมกษัตริย์ไทย (Borom Kasat Thai)
ขอบรรดาล (Kho Bandan)
ธประสงค์ใด (Tha Prasong Dai)
จงสิทธิดั่ง (Chong Sitthi Dang)
หวังวรหฤทัย (Wang Wora Haruethai)
ดุจถวายชัย (Dutcha Thawai Chai)
ชโย (Cha-yo)

== Mandate 9 ==
On language and writing and the duty of good citizens, issued 24 June 1940, consisted of four items:

1. "Thai people must extol, honour and respect the Thai language, and must feel honoured to speak it."
2. "Thai people must consider it the duty of a good citizen to study the national language, and must at least be able to read and write; Thai people must also consider it their important duty to assist and support citizens who do not speak Thai or cannot read Thai to learn it."
3. "Thai people must not consider place of birth, residence, or regional accent as a marker of division. Everyone must hold it to be true that all born as Thai people have the same Thai blood and speak the same Thai language. Place of birth or accent makes no difference."
4. "Thai people must consider it their duty to conduct themselves as good Thai citizens should, and to urge and instruct those who do not yet know and understand their duty as to the duties of a good citizen of the Thai nation."

== Mandate 10 ==
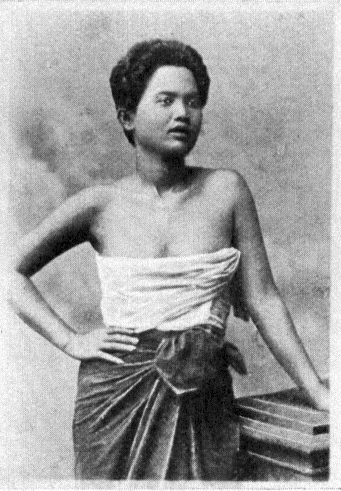
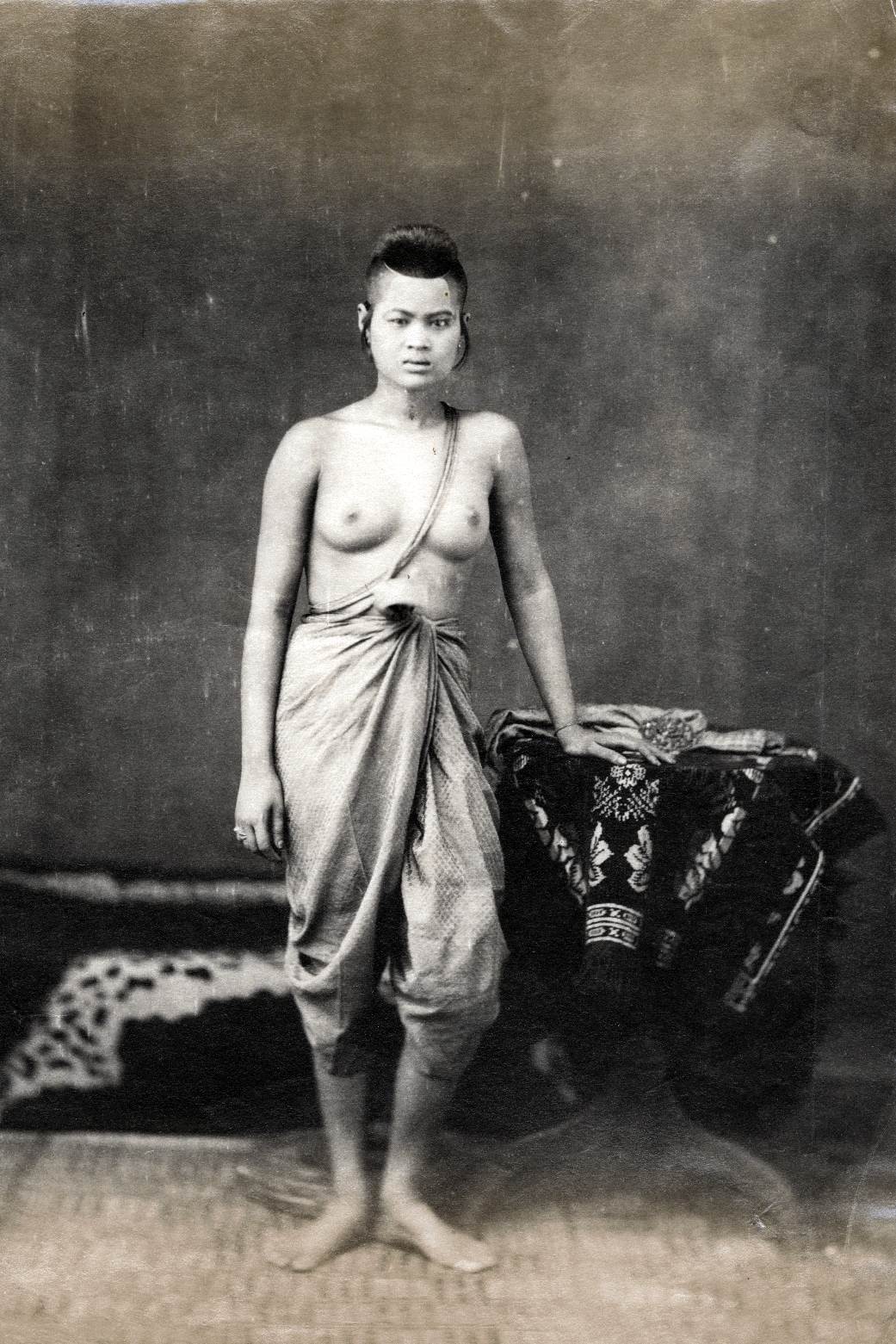

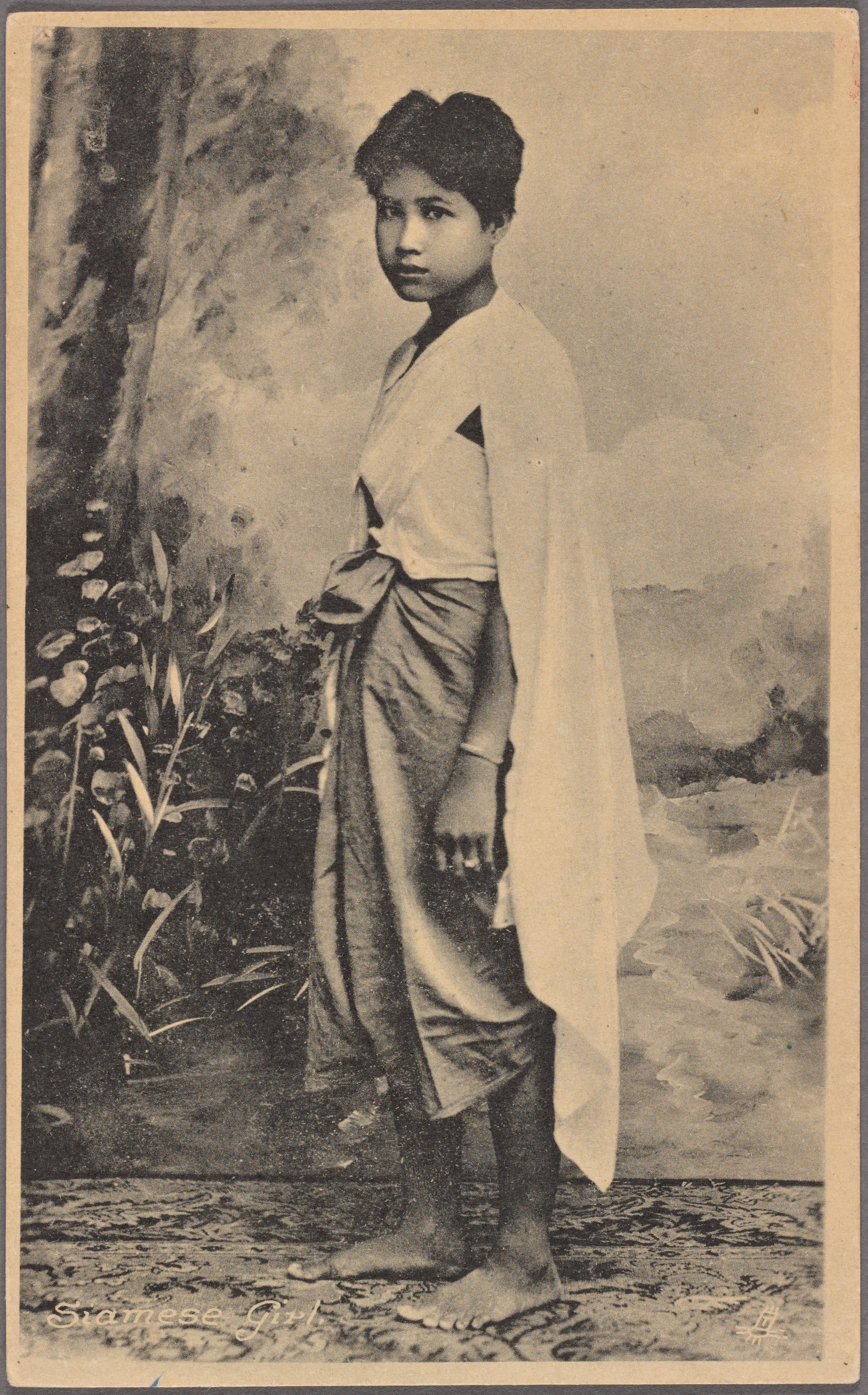
1900s portraits of Thai women in a traditional costume (since the Rattanakosin period) that was deemed inappropriate after the laws on Thai dress were enacted in the early 1940s.

On Thai dress, issued 15 January 1941, consisted of two items:

1. "Thai people should not appear at public gatherings, in public places, or in city limits without being appropriately dressed. Inappropriate dress includes wearing only underpants, wearing no shirt, or wearing a wraparound cloth."
2. "Appropriate dress for Thai people consists of:
  - "Uniforms, as position and opportunity permits;
  - "Polite international-style attire;
  - "Polite traditional attire."

== Mandate 11 ==
On daily activities, issued 8 September 1941, consisted of five items:

1. "Thai people should divide their time into three portions. One for work, one for personal activities, and one for rest and sleeping. This should be orderly and follow a schedule until it becomes habitual."
2. "Thai people should carry out their normal personal activities as follows:
  - "Eat meals at set times, no more than four daily;
  - "Sleep approximately 6-8 hours."
3. "Thai people should faithfully perform work duties without discouragement or shirking. The midday rest and lunch period should be no longer than one hour. At the end of the working day, exercise by playing sports for at least one hour, or other activities such as gardening, caring for pets, or planting trees. Then, after showering, eat dinner.
4. "Thai people should use their free time at night to complete necessary work, converse with family and friends, seek knowledge by listening to radio news or reading, or other entertainment or arts, as opportunity permits."
5. "Thai people should use days off to benefit their bodies and minds by participating in religious activities, listening to sermons, making merit, seeking knowledge, traveling, playing sports, or resting."

== Mandate 12 ==
The final mandate, On protecting children, the elderly and the handicapped, issued 28 January 1942, consisted of two items:

1. "In public places or roads, people should assist and protect children, the elderly, or the handicapped."
2. "Whoever follows item 1 is considered a cultured person deserving of the respect of the Thai people."

== 21st-century cultural mandates ==
=== The 12 Core Values ===
In 2014, the National Council for Peace and Order, a military government that rose to power after a coup, unveiled the "12 Core Values of Thailand" (Thai: ค่านิยม 12 ประการ), a campaign intended to act as a moral guide for Thai youths, reminiscent of the earlier Thai cultural mandates. The 12 values are:

1. "Upholding of the three main pillars of the country: the nation, the religion, and the monarchy"
2. "Honesty, sacrifice, and patience, with positive attitude for the interest of the public"
3. "Practicing filial piety towards parents, guardians, and teachers"
4. "Seeking both direct and indirect knowledge and education"
5. "Preservation of Thai traditions and culture"
6. "Morality, integrity, considerateness, generosity, and sharing"
7. "Understanding and learning of true democratic ideals, with His Majesty the King as Head of State"
8. "Maintaining of discipline, respecting laws and the elderly"
9. "Being conscious and mindful of action in line with His Majesty the King's royal statements"
10. "Applying His Majesty the King's sufficiency economy, saving money for time of need, being moderate with surplus for sharing or expansion of business, while having good immunity"
11. "Keeping physically and mentally strong, unyielding to evil powers or desires, and having a sense of shame over guilt and sins in accordance with religious principles"
12. "Putting the public and national interest before one's own"

The campaign has been criticized by some academics as "mere state propaganda". Students were required to recite the core values daily, either as part of their flag ceremony or in their classes. The core values were also turned into a song, and several stickers referencing the core values were made for the LINE messaging app.

== See also ==
- Thailand in World War II
- Ramwong
- Thai spelling reform of 1942
- Thaification
