= Khun Chang Khun Phaen =

Thai epic poem

- Author: unknown
- Original title: ขุนช้างขุนแผน ฉบับหอสมุดพระวชิรญาณ
- Language: Thai
- Genre: Epic poem
- Published: 1917 (1st standard ed.)
- Publication place: Thailand
- Media type: Print
- Pages: 1085

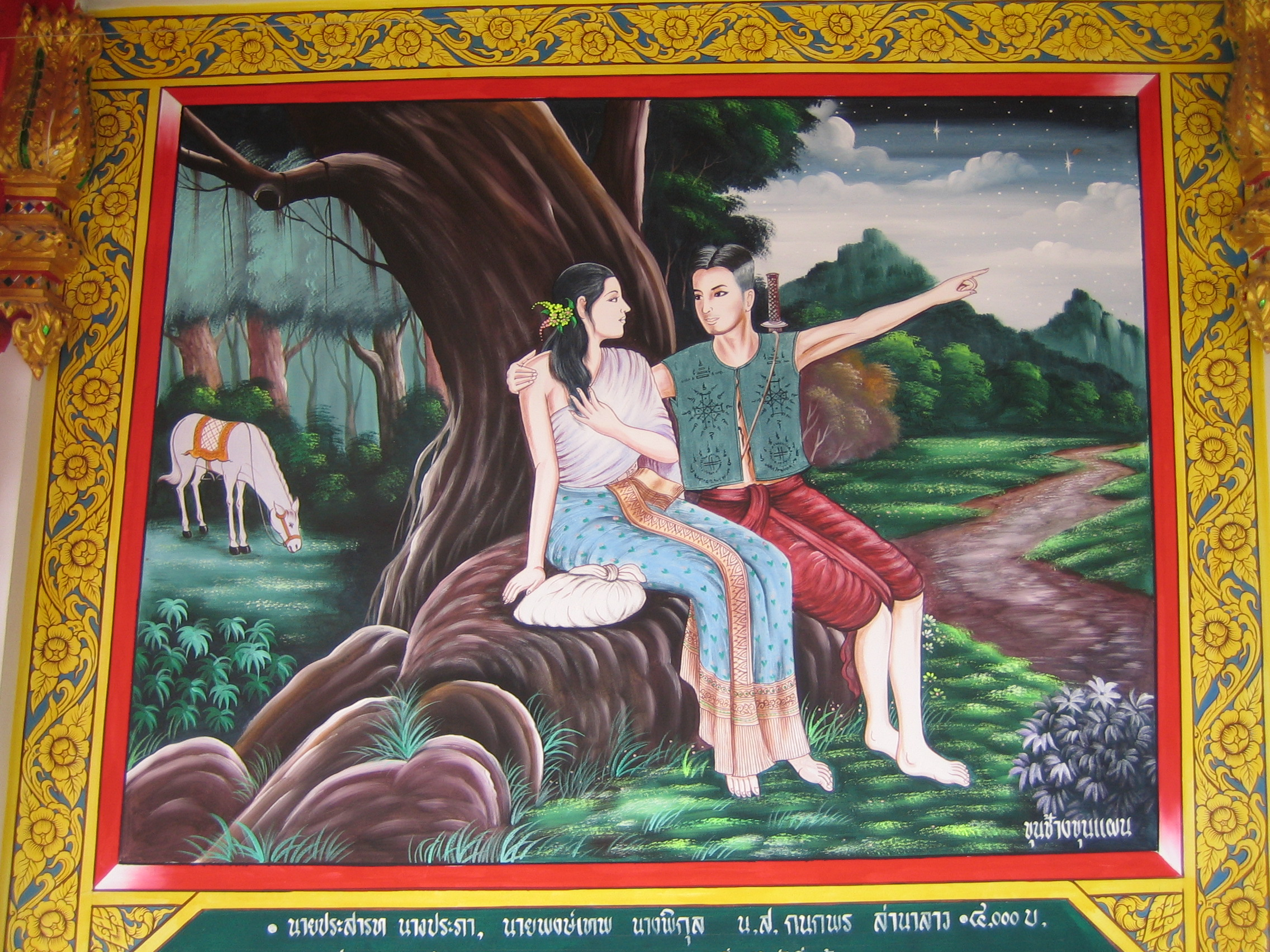
Khun Phaen and Wanthong flee to the forest. Mural from sala on Khao Phra, U Thong.

Khun Chang Khun Phaen (Thai: ขุนช้างขุนแผน, pronounced [kʰǔn tɕʰáːŋ kʰǔn pʰɛ̌ːn]) is a long Thai epic poem which originated from a legend of Thai folklore and is one of the most notable works in Thai literature. The work's entire length is over 20,000 couplets. Khun Chang and Khun Phaen are the leading male characters, where "Khun" was a junior feudal title given for male commoners. The story recounts the adventurous and amorous struggles of the three main protagonists. Much of their relationship can be described as a love triangle. Khun Phaen (dashing but poor) and Khun Chang (rich but ugly) compete for the lovely Wanthong from childhood for over fifty years. Their stories transpire amid the larger backdrop of national events, including two wars, several abductions, a suspected revolt, an idyllic sojourn in the forest, two court cases, trial by ordeal, jail, and treachery. Ultimately the King of Ayutthaya condemns Wanthong to death for failing to choose between the two men.

The KCKP epic existed for a long time as an orally transmitted poem among Thai troubadours. The poem was first written down and published in printed form in 1872, and a standard edition first published in 1917–1918. Like many works with origins in popular entertainment, it is fast-moving and replete with heroism, romance, sex, violence, folk comedy, magic, horror, and passages of lyrical beauty. In Thailand, the story is universally known. Children learn passages at school, and the poem is a source of songs, popular aphorisms, and everyday metaphors. A standard edition of KCKP, as published by the National Library, is 1085-pages long. A complete English prose translation of KCKP was published by Chris Baker and Pasuk Phongpaichit in 2010.

== Origins and sepha ==
Modern performance of sepha, showing krap.

Khun Chang Khun Phaen is an old folk story in the Thai language. It originated as a folk entertainment some time around 17th century, developed by storytellers who recited episodes for local audiences, and passed on the story by word-of-mouth. By the 18th century, such performances had become the most popular form of entertainment in Siam. The storytellers recounted the story in stylized recitation, using two small sticks of wood (krap) to give rhythm and emphasis. The performances typically lasted a full night.

The performance of Khun Chang Khun Phaen created a new genre known as sepha. For at least a century, only episodes from this work were known by this term. In the Fourth Reign (1851–1868), parts of the royal chronicles and a few other works were also rendered in this form on royal commission, but all but a few fragments have since disappeared.

The origin of this word sepha is disputed. There is a musical form of the same name, but this seems unconnected. Kukrit Pramoj thought that sepha meant a jail and that the genre was developed by convicts in jail. Sujit Wongthet argued a connection to the Sanskrit word sewa, indicating some original association with ritual.

== Development as literature ==
Beginning in the eighteenth century, prominent episodes from the story were written down. After the foundation of Bangkok in 1782, the new royal court made efforts to retrieve all kinds of texts which had survived the sack of Ayutthaya fifteen years earlier. Episodes of Khun Chang Khun Phaen were transcribed from earlier texts, or adapted from recitations by storytellers. No manuscripts of Khun Chang Khun Phaen have survived from the Ayutthaya era.

It became conventional to render these written versions in the then-popular poetic meter, klon (Thai: กลอน), especially the variant with eight-syllable lines known as klon paet. Performance of these episodes were popular in the court and among the aristocracy. In the Second Reign (1809–1824), the performance was often enhanced by adding music. From the Fourth Reign (1851–1868), dancing was also added and more than one performer might share the task of recitation.

Several chapters were written down by members of the literary salon of King Rama II (1809–1824). None of these works are signed, but certain chapters and part-chapters are conventionally attributed to King Rama II, the future King Rama III (r. 1824–1851), and the great poet Sunthorn Phu. Another member of the salon, Prince Mahasak Phonlasep, a son of King Rama I (1782–1809) and cousin of King Rama II, may also have contributed to the writing. Several other chapters were compiled later, probably during the reign of King Rama III, by Khru Jaeng, a performer of sepha and other forms of entertainment. Little is known of him except for an internal reference in the poem. For over half the 43 chapters in the standard version, the author is unknown.

== Publication ==
A former missionary, Samuel J. Smith, printed the first book version in 1872, probably using a manuscript belonging to Somdet Chaophraya Borommaha Sisuriyawong. Another printed version was issued in 1889 by the Wat Ko Press. Five episodes composed by Khru Jaeng were printed around 1890.

The standard modern edition appeared in three volumes in 1917–1918, published by the Wachirayan Library, and edited by its head, Prince Damrong Rachanubhab. Damrong compiled from four sets of samut thai manuscripts and a few other fragments. The earliest of the manuscripts dated from the Fourth Reign (1851–1868). He selected what he believed were the best versions of each episode, and added some link passages. He deleted some passages which he considered obscene, and some which depended on topical jokes and other material which he felt were no longer comprehensible.

This standard edition is around 20,000 lines divided into 43 chapters. The main story ends in chapter 36, but a further seven chapters were included because the episodes were well-known and popular. Performers and authors had already developed many more episodes which extended the story down through three generations of Khun Phaen's lineage. Damrong decreed that these were not good enough as either narrative or poetry to deserve publication. Around fifty of these later chapters have since been published in various collections.

== Synopsis ==
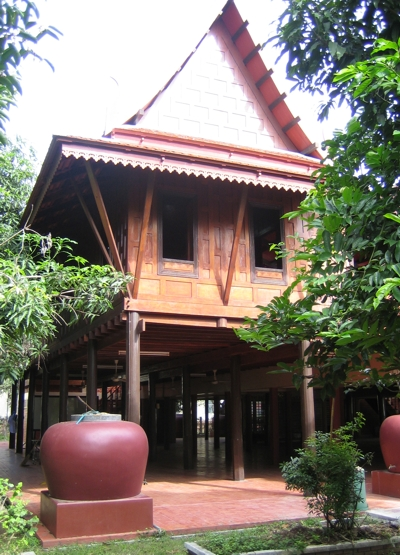
Model of Khun Chang's house at Wat Palelai, Suphanburi.

Old Thai house erected on site of Ayutthaya jail, and called Khun Phaen's House.

Khun Chang, Phlai Kaeo (who later is given the title Khun Phaen), and Nang Phim Philalai (who later changes her name to Wanthong) are childhood friends in Suphanburi. Khun Phaen is handsome and intelligent, but poor because the king has executed his father and seized their property. He enters the monkhood as a novice to get educated, excelling at military skills and love magic. Khun Chang is ugly and dim-witted, but rich and well-connected at the Ayutthaya court.

By age 15, Phim is the belle of Suphanburi. She meets Phlai Kaeo when putting food in his almsbowl at Songkran (Thai New Year). Sparks fly. They have a passionate affair, with him shuttling between the wat (Buddhist monastery) and her bedroom. Khun Chang is also smitten by Phim. He competes for her using his wealth and status. He offers to give her mother Phim's weight in gold. After Phlai Kaeo and Phim are married, Khun Chang maneuvers the king to send Phlai Kaeo on military service, and then claims he is dead. When Phlai Kaeo returns victorious, Khun Chang plots to have him banished from Ayutthaya for negligence on government service.

Phim (now Wanthong) resists Khun Chang's advance. But when Phlai Kaeo (now Khun Phaen) returns from war with another wife, they have a jealous quarrel. Wanthong goes to live with Khun Chang, enjoying his devotion and the comforts afforded by his wealth.

When Khun Phaen's second wife, Laothong, is taken into the palace by the king, Khun Phaen regrets abandoning Wanthong. He breaks into Khun Chang's house at the dead of night and takes Wanthong away. At first she is reluctant to leave her comfortable life, but the passion rekindles, and they flee to an idyllic but frugal sojourn in the forest.

Khun Chang, furious with the elopement, tries to frame Khun Phaen on the ground of treason. He tells the king that Khun Phaen is mounting a rebellion. The king sends an army which Khun Phaen defeats, killing two of its officers. A warrant is issued for his arrest. When Wanthong becomes pregnant, Khun Phaen decides to leave the forest and give himself up. At the court trial scene, the charges of rebellion are disproved. Khun Phaen is acquitted and Khun Chang is heavily fined.

Khun Phaen nevertheless angers the king by asking for the release of Laothong. He is jailed, and festers in prison for around twelve years. Khun Chang abducts Wanthong and they again live together in Suphanburi. Wanthong gives birth to Phlai Ngam, her son with Khun Phaen. When Phlai Ngam is eight, Khun Chang tries to kill him. Phlai Ngam escapes to live in Kanchanaburi with his grandmother who teaches him from Khun Phaen's library.

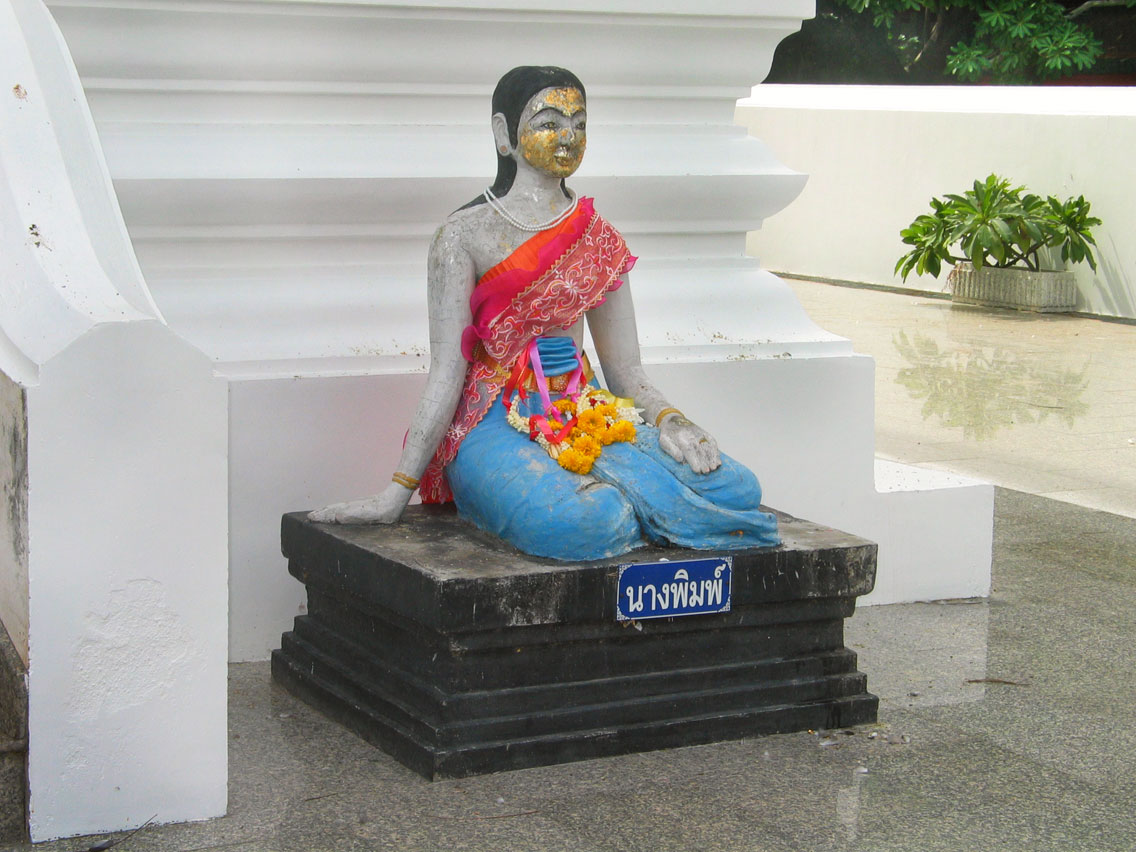
Nang Phim, Wat Pa Lelai, Suphanburi, Thailand

When the kings of Ayutthaya and Chiang Mai quarrel over a beautiful daughter of the King of Vientiane, Phlai Ngam volunteers to lead an army to Chiang Mai, and successfully petitions for Khun Phaen's release. They capture the King of Chiang Mai, and return with the Vientiane princess and a great haul of booty. Khun Phaen now gains status as the governor of Kanchanaburi. Phlai Ngam is appointed Phra Wai, an officer in the royal pages.

Khun Chang gets drunk at Phra Wai's wedding, and the old rivalry returns. Phra Wai abducts Wanthong from Khun Chang's house, prompting Khun Chang to petition the king for redress. At the subsequent trial, the king demands that Wanthong decide between Khun Chang and Khun Phaen. She cannot, and is dumb-struck. The king orders her execution because she is seen as a woman who has 'two hearts', a symbol of unfaithfulness. Phra Wai pleads successfully with the king for a reprieve, but the order arrives fractionally too late to avoid her execution.

== Origins of the story ==
Prince Damrong believed that the Khun Chang Khun Phaen story was based on true events which took place around 1500 in the reign of King Ramathibodi II. His evidence was a memoir believed to have been taken down from Thai prisoners in Burma after the fall of Ayutthaya in 1767 (Khamhaikan chao krung kao, The testimony of the inhabitants of the old capital). The memoir mentions the name of Khun Phaen in an account of a military campaign against Chiang Mai. However, this memoir is just as much a text of oral history as Khun Chang Khun Phaen itself, and could well have developed from the folktale, rather than vice versa. The campaign against Chiang Mai in the latter part of Khun Chang Khun Phaen seems to be modeled on events which appear in the Ayutthaya and Lan Xang chronicles for the 1560s.

The opening chapter of Khun Chang Khun Phaen mentions a gift from the Emperor of China which might be dated shortly before 1600. The third chapter has a date based on a 120-year calendar which can be resolved as 1549/50, 1669/70, or 1789/90.

Most likely Khun Chang Khun Phaen developed over decades or centuries by storytellers absorbing and embellishing several local tales and true stories. Prince Damrong surmised that the original version was much shorter and simpler: Khun Phaen woos and marries Wanthong but then goes to war; Khun Chang seizes her; Khun Phaen returns and in the ensuing squabble, Wanthong is condemned to death. The story then expanded as other episodes were assembled using these leading characters. The whole second half of the standard version shows signs of being an extension which repeats themes and episodes from the first half. Certain episodes are known to have been newly written and incorporated in the nineteenth century. Some episodes are known to be modeled on true events. The arrival of an embassy from Lanchang, for example, is based on the reception of an embassy from Tavoy at Ayutthaya in 1791.

== Characteristics ==
=== Realism ===
Most major works of old Thai literature are about gods and royalty, and take place in the court or the heavens. Khun Chang Khun Phaen is the great exception. The major characters are drawn from the minor provincial gentry. The authors build an atmosphere of realism by cramming the narrative with anthropological detail on dress, marriages, funerals, temple ceremonies, feasts (including menus and recipes), court cases, trial by ordeal, house building, travel, and entertainment.

In addition, the geography is real. Most of the action takes place in Suphanburi, Kanchanaburi, and Ayutthaya, and the locations are easily identifiable today, including temples and cross-country routes. Several places mentioned in the text appear on some early nineteenth century maps which were recently discovered in the royal palace in Bangkok.

In the later part of the tale there is an expedition to Vientiane which clearly follows one of the routes taken by Bangkok armies during the war against Vientiane in 1827–1828. There are also two military campaigns to Chiang Mai, but here the geography is much less certain. The place names are correct, but temples are located in the wrong town, routes between places make no geographical sense, and other mistakes indicate that the authors had only a hazy idea of the northern region.

=== Supernatural ===
Khun Phaen amulet.

As a novice, Phlai Kaeo is schooled in the "inner ways" (Thai: ทางใน, thang nai). This phrase refers to beliefs in supernatural powers which exist within human beings and other natural objects, and which can be activated through taught skills. These beliefs stem from the esoteric school of Buddhism, and are found as a substratum in Buddhism throughout Southeast Asia and other parts of the Buddhist world.

The methods to activate these latent powers include meditation and recitation of mantras or formulas (elsewhere, yoga is another method). The power can also be transferred to objects, especially diagrams known as yantra (Thai: เลขยันต์, lek yan). In India, where they probably originated, such diagrams are composed mostly of geometric shapes with symbolic meanings arranged in symmetrical patterns (the mandala is a yantra). In the Thai tradition, these diagrams also include numbers in sequences with supernatural meaning, pictures of gods and powerful animals (lion, tiger, elephant), and formulas or abbreviated formulas written in Pali or Khmer. To have power, these diagrams have to be drawn by an adept under strict rules (such as reciting formulas continuously, completing the drawing in one sitting), and activated by reciting a formula.

Yantra (called yan in Thai) diagrams can be carried on the body in various ways: tattooed on the skin (sak yan - สักยันต์); imprinted on a shirt or inner shirt; imprinted on a scarf (Thai: ประเจียด, prajiat) tied round the head, arm, or chest; imprinted on a belt, perhaps made from human skin; imprinted on paper or cloth which is then rolled and plaited into a ring (Thai: แหวน พิรอด, waen phirot); inscribed on a soft metal such as tin which is coiled round a cord and worn as an amulet (Thai: ตะกรุด, takrut. The main purpose of these various forms of yan designs with Khom inscriptions, is to give invulnerability or protection against various forms of threat.

The same purpose is served by carrying amulets made from natural materials which have some unusual property which seems contrary to nature. A good example is mercury – a metal which has the unusual property of behaving like a fluid. Other examples include cat's eye, a semi-precious stone which resembles an animal's eye, and “fluid metal” (Thai: เหล็กไหล, lek lai), a metal-like substance believed to become malleable under the heat of a candle's flame. These items can be strung on cords and worn around various parts of the body, or inserted under the skin.

Before going into battle or any other undertaking entailing risk, Khun Phaen decks himself with several of these items. He also consults various oracles which indicate whether the time and the direction of travel is auspicious. These oracles include casting various forms of horoscope, looking for shapes in the clouds, and examining which nostril the breath is passing most easily.

Khun Phaen is also schooled in mantras or formulas with supernatural power. They are used for such purposes as stunning enemies, transforming his body into other forms, opening locks and chains, putting everyone else to sleep, and converting sheaves of grass into invulnerable spirit warriors. Khun Phaen also uses love formulas to captivate women, and to allay the wrath of the king.

Finally, Khun Phaen has a corps of spirits which he looks after. They defend him against enemy spirits, act as spies, and transport him at speed. In a famous passage, Khun Phaen acquires an especially powerful spirit from the still-born foetus of his own son. This spirit is known as a Kuman thong (Thai: กุมารทอง), a golden child.

In the poem, the command of these powers is described using several combinations of the following words: wicha (Thai: วิชา), taught knowledge; witthaya (Thai: วิทยา), from vidya, similar to the suffix, -ology; wet (Thai: เวท), from veda, the Brahminical scriptures; mon (Thai: มนตร์), mantra, a Buddhist prayer; katha (Thai: คาถา), from gatha, a verse or formula; and akhom (Thai: อาคม), from agama, a Sanskrit word meaning knowledge, especially pre-vedic texts. These words position the command of these powers as an ancient and sacred form of learning.

== Adaptations ==
While the poetic sepha has become the standard version of Khun Chang Khun Phaen, the story has been rendered into many other forms.

In the nineteenth century, various episodes were adapted into drama plays (lakhon), dance dramas, comedies, and likay. In the twentieth century, episodes were adapted into the poetical form of nirat, and the folk performance of phleng choi.

Khun Chang Khun Phaen also has been adopted as a traditional folk tale in Cambodia, under the name 'ឃុនឆាង ឃុនផែន' and has appeared in various adaptations.

There have been five film versions, beginning with a silent film in two parts by Bamrung Naewphanit in 1936. The most recent film version, Khun Phaen, was directed by Thanit Jitnukul in 2002.

A first TV version appeared as a single episode in 1955. A 1970 version, recounting the exploits of Khun Phaen as governor of Kanchanaburi, extended over 500 episodes. Thai Channel 3 aired a serial version under the name Phim Phlilalai (Wanthong's natal name) in 1985, and Thai Channel 5 aired a serial Khun Phaen in 1998.

A cartoon version, drawn by Sawat Jukarop, appeared in Siam Rath from 1932 to 1950. The latest among many book-length cartoon versions was compiled by Sukrit Boonthong in 2005.

Several famous artists have illustrated scenes from Khun Chang Phaen, especially Hem Vejakorn. In 1917, BAT Co Ltd issues a series of 100 cigarette cards featuring characters from the story.

There have been several adaptations into novels, beginning with Malai Chuphinit, Chai Chatri (The Hero) in 1932. The most famous is Khun Phaen written by the major thriller author Por Intharapalit in 1972.

There have been at least seven re-tellings of the story in modern Thai prose. The first, and most complete of these, was by Premseri in 1964.

Three other works tell the story with the addition of annotations and explanations of old words and forgotten customs. The study by Suphon Bunnag was published in two volumes in 1960, and republished in her cremation volume in 1975. Khun Wichitmatra (Sanga Kanchanakphan) and Phleuang na Nakhon wrote a series of articles in the magazine Withayasan over 1954–57, collected together in book form in 1961. Kukrit Pramoj also wrote a series of articles in Siam Rath, collected as a book in 1989.

In 2002 Sujit Wongthet published a similar work which originated as a series of articles in the magazine Sinlapa Watthanatham (Art and Culture). The book includes a copy of two manuscript versions of chapter 17, which Sujit secured from the National Archives under the Freedom of Information Act. These manuscripts reveal what Prince Damrong had excised in his editing.

Cholthira Satyawadhna wrote an MA dissertation in 1970 using a Freudian approach to analyze aggression in Khun Chang Khun Phaen. The thesis became famous, both as a landmark in Thai literary criticism, and as an early Thai feminist treatise.

A Thai variation of the sliding block puzzle Klotski is named after Khun Chang Khun Phaen. In it, Khun Phaen is imprisoned, and must escape by getting past nine sentries guarding him. The initial placement of the blocks is slightly different to the conventional layout.

In 2021, the Thai Channel One31 aired a modern adaptation of the story in a series called "Wanthong". The series can be watched in its entirety on YouTube.

== In modern life ==
Shrine to Khun Phaen and his father Khun Krai, including a golden fighting cock, at Cockfight Hill, Kanchanaburi.

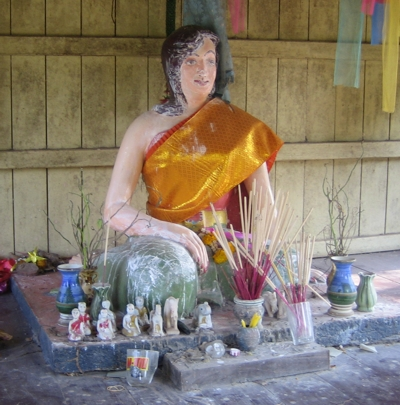
Shrine to Nang Simala at Old Phichit.

Shrine to Nang Buakhli on stalactite in cave at Ban Tham, Kanchanaburi.

Khun Chang Khun Phaen is the source of many sayings in modern Thai, and several songs. The name Khun Phaen is shorthand for a great lover (similar to Romeo or Casanova). It is also the name of a famous amulet, reputed to bring success in love, and the slang for a large "chopper" motorcycle.

In Suphanburi and Phichit, towns which figure prominently in the poem, the major streets have been named after characters in the story.

At several locations featured in the story there are now shrines with images of the characters. Such locations include Cockfight Hill in old Kanchanaburi (images of Khun Phaen and his father Khun Krai), the old town of Phichit (Nang Simala), and Ban Tham in Kanchanaburi (Nang Buakhli).

In Ayutthaya, an old Thai house has been erected on the site of the jail where Khun Phaen was incarcerated in the poem. The house has been renamed “Khum Khun Phaen” and is a major tourist attraction. A similar house, attributed to Khun Phaen, has recently been erected in Wat Khae in Suphanburi. This temple also has an old tamarind tree which is legendarily associated with a passage in the poem in which Khun Phaen is taught how to transform tamarind leaves into wasps.

Wat Palelai, Suphanburi, has erected a model of Khun Chang's house, and commissioned a series of murals from the Khun Chang Khun Phaen story around its main cloister.

== Contemporary status ==
Almost every Thai knows the story of Khun Chang Khun Phaen. Most children have to memorize and recite extracts at school.

In the past, Thailand's literary establishment did not incline to accept Khun Chang Khun Phaen as the country's national literature, probably because of the work's appeal to mass entertainment and its lack of courtly refinement that Ayutthaya's royal audience valued. In addition, despite the work's focus on common protagonists, feminists and political correctness movements of the 1970s have criticized the story for celebrating Khun Phaen as a promiscuous lover, and making Wanthong a tragic victim.

Kukrit Pramoj opened his study of the poem with the remark: “At present there are some knowledgeable people who have expressed the opinion that Khun Chang Khun Phaen is an immoral book and a bad example which should be burnt or destroyed, so no one may read it from now on.”

Kukrit Pramoj is one among many enthusiasts who value Khun Chang Khun Phaen as a great story and as a unique repository of old Thai culture. Other prominent defenders include:

- Sulak Sivaraksa (social commentator, activist): “This immortal story is number one in Thai literature, and cedes nothing to the major literary works of other nations."
- Rong Wongsawan (novelist, essayist): “I like Khun Chang Khun Phaen and still read it today. It's the literary work which best reflects the life of the Thai. In simple words, the voice of the people."
- Naowarat Phongphaibun (national poet): “Every Thai person over 30 should read at least four or five books, starting with Khun Chang Khun Phaen.”
- William J. Gedney (linguist): "I have often thought that if all other information on traditional Thai culture were to be lost, the whole complex could be reconstructed from this marvellous text."

== Translation ==
In 2010 the first complete translation into English has been done. Before that there was no full translation into any European language. Prem Chaya (Prince Prem Purachatra) began a précis version, The Story of Khun Chang Khun Phaen (1955, 1959), but completed only two of the three planned volumes. J. Kasem Sibunruang compiled an abridged version in French, with some commentary, as La femme, le heros et le vilain. Poeme populaire thai. Khun Chang, Khun Phen (1960). Klaus Wenk translated the famous chapter 24 by Sunthorn Phu word-for-word into German, in Studien zur Literatur der Thai: Texte und Interpretationen von und zu Sunthon Phu und seinem Kreis. Hamburg and Bangkok (1985).

There are very few studies on Khun Chang Khun Phaen in western languages. Prince Bidyalongkorn wrote two articles on the poem in the Journal of the Siam Society in 1926 and 1941 which explain the metrical form of the sepha and give a summary of the plot. E. H. S. Simmonds published an aritlce in Asia Major in 1963 which compares one episode in the standard text with a version he recorded in performance.

Khun Chang Khun Phaen has been completely translated into English by husband-and-wife team Chris Baker and Pasuk Phongpaichit in 2010.

== See also ==
- Thai poetry
