= Palad khik =

Phallic Thai amulet

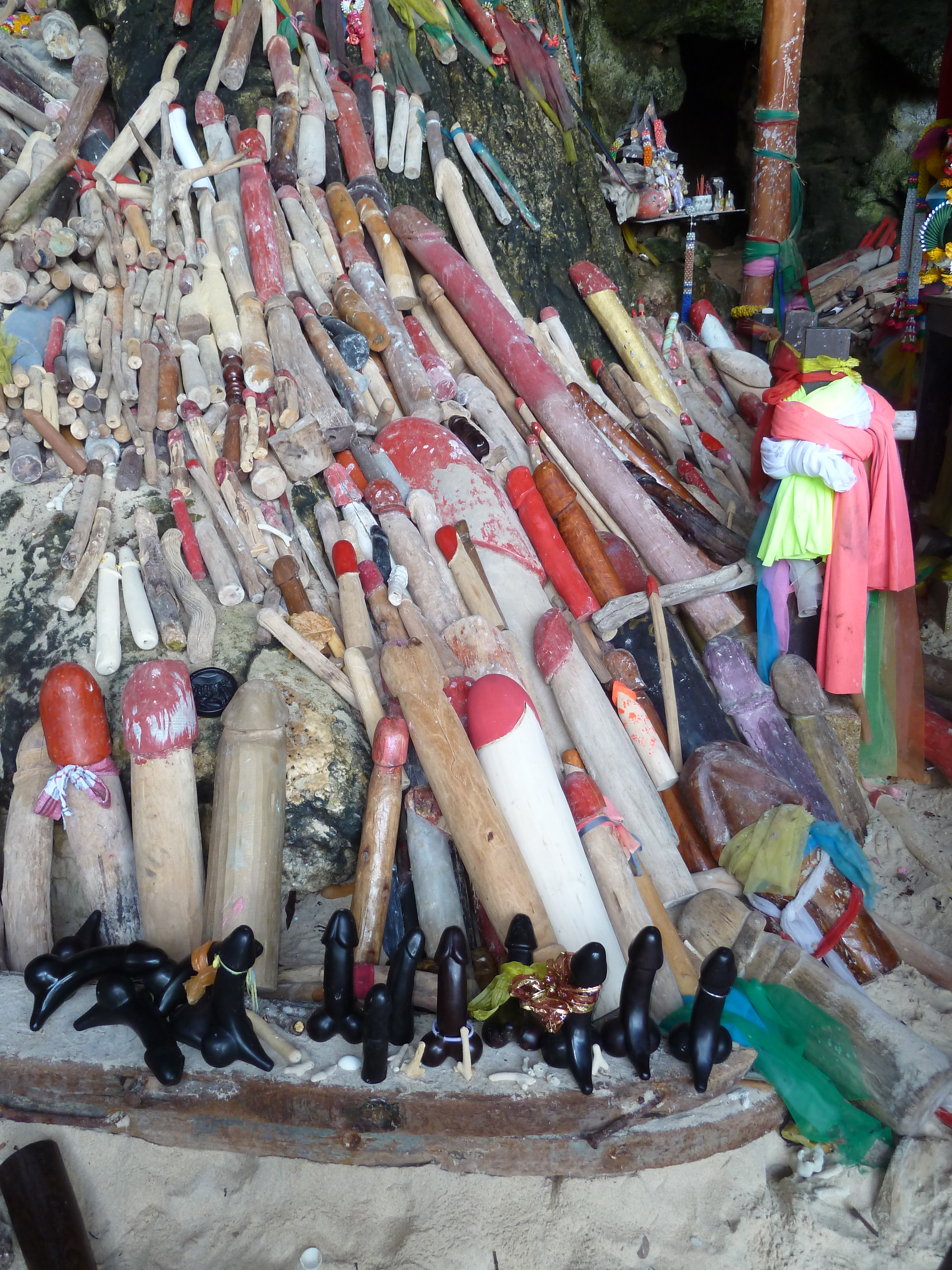
Palad khiks at the Phra Nang Cave on Railay Beach in Krabi Province

Palad Khik (Thai: ปลัดขิก, pronounced [pā.làt kʰìk], RTGS: palatkhik) is a kind of Thai amulet that is shaped like a penis. The phrase "palad khik" means "honorable surrogate penis". These amulets range from a few inches to several feet long in length. The smaller versions are usually worn on the body while the larger versions are displayed in shops and other establishments.

== Origin ==
Palad Khik originated in India and relate to the Hindu god Shiva, who is usually represented by Shiva Linga. They were brought to Southeast Asia via the Cham people and remained in the region ever since. The Chinese concept called Yang is similar, where Shiva is represented abstractly in the form of Linga (male genitalia). Sometimes the linga are accompanied by Yoni (female genitalia). Together, the linga and yoni symbolize unity and the powers of creation and destruction.

The Palad Khik, as a phallic representation of Shiva, is also an animistic symbol of fertility. It is not uncommon in Thailand to see a penis amulet hanging on a convenience store or a restaurant, or even being sold by old women on the street. Although outsiders may regard these as offensive, ordinary Thais are deeply superstitious and lucky charms and talismans are still regarded as important.

Palad Khik can be made from wood, metal, bone, horn or ivory, and they are created by monks who specialize in them. Engraving the sacred inscriptions is an important ritual and can take many days to complete. Cast metal palad khiks do not always have these inscriptions, but they may have animal symbols.

Palad khik amulets must be empowered by the repetition of incantations, which Thais call 'Kata Bucha', derived from the Devanagari 'ghata pooja'. The incantations depend on the creator's lineage in each school of traditional non-Buddhist animist magic. Kata Bucha Palad Khik would commonly be a four syllable heart Mantra (Kata Hua Jai), such as 'Ganha Neha' and 'Na Ma Pa Ta', or, 'Ja Pa Ga Sa'

== Variations of use and purpose ==
Palad Khiks are usually worn by males on a cord around their waist under the clothes and off-center from the real penis. It is not unusual for a male to wear many palad khiks at the same time, in the hope to attract women, increase gambling luck and protection from dangerous objects such as bullets and knives. At times, women in Thailand also carry it in their purses to protect them from rape and mugging. Shop owners display them in their shops or in the cash register area to protect their business and also bring good luck and sales. A notable feature of this type of amulet is it can be worn in places considered as lowly or unclean such as bars, gambling casinos and brothels. Normally, you cannot bring a Buddhist amulet inside such establishments.

== See also ==
- Khatha
- Kuman Thong
- Lingam
- Phallus
- Shiva
- Takrut
- Yin and yang
- Yoni
