= Thai Buddha amulet =

Blessed item

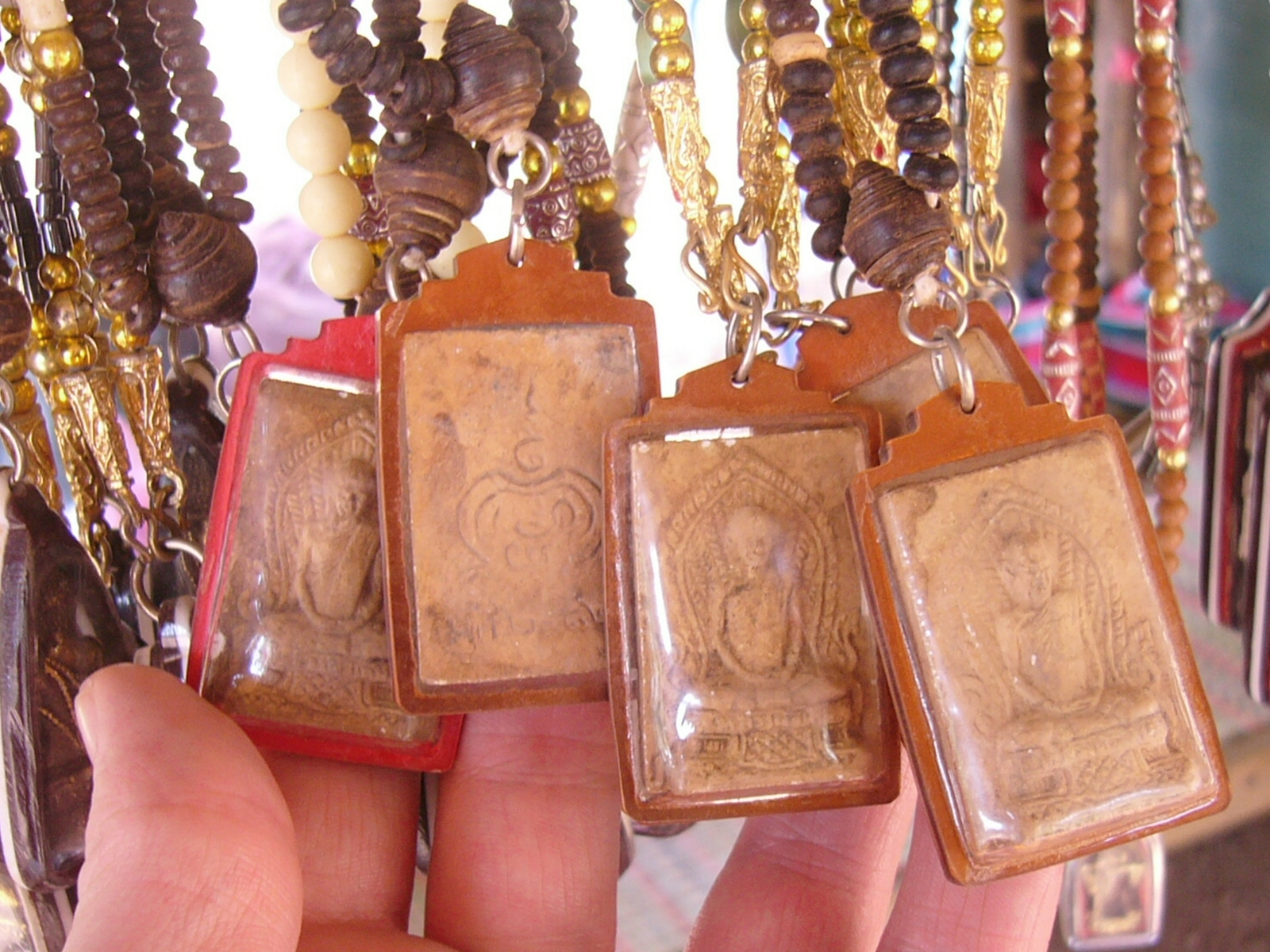
Thai amulets

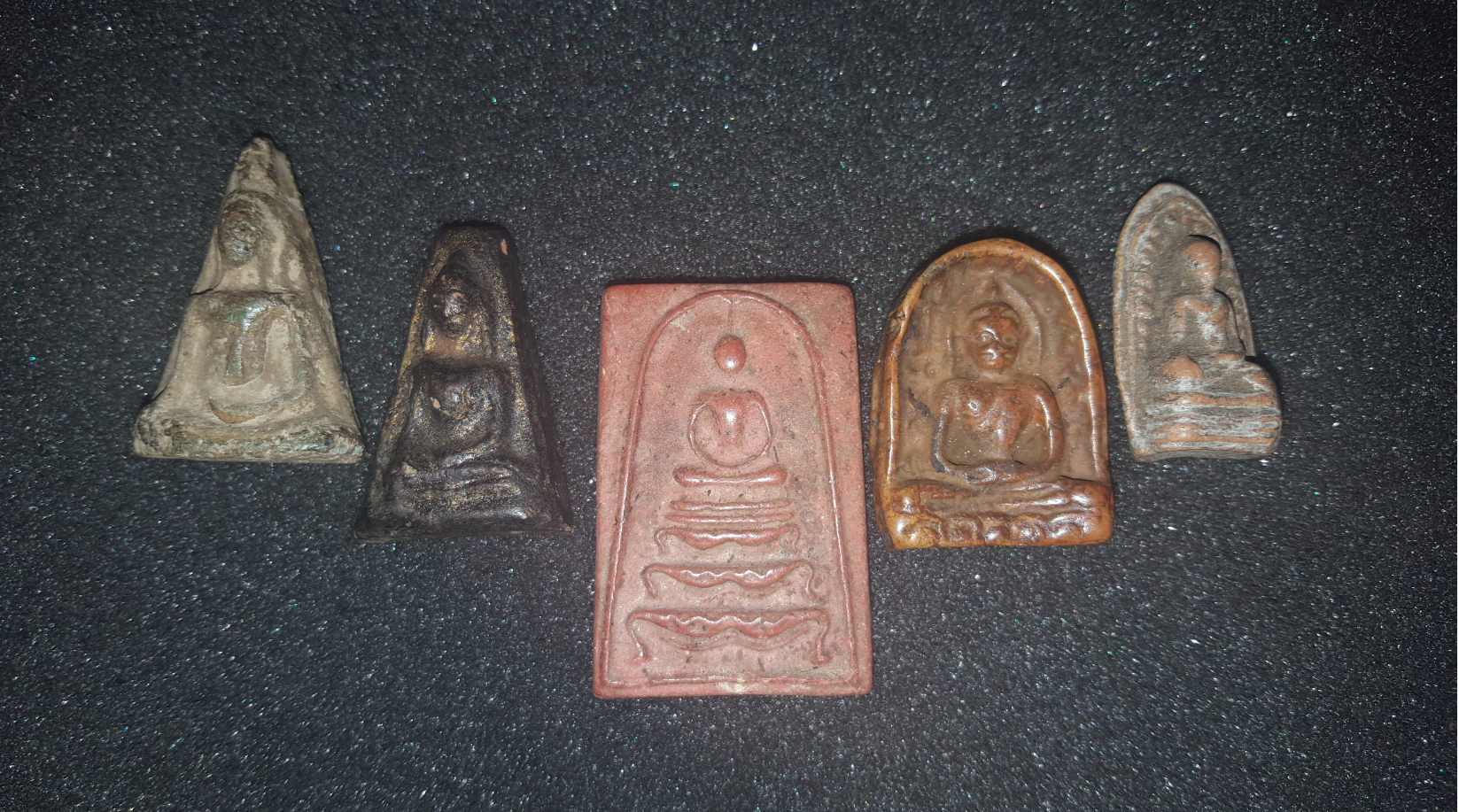
Benjapakee

Thai Buddha amulets (Thai: พระเครื่อง; RTGS: phrakhrueang), often simply called amulets (พระเครื่อง), are small Buddha images or sacred objects originally created to be enshrined in chedi (stupas) as relics to commemorate the Buddha. They may also include figurines of revered monks, bodhisattvas, or devas (deities). Amulets are often worn for protection, good fortune, charisma, or invulnerability, reflecting beliefs in merit, supernatural power, and blessings.

The term "amulet" in this sense first appeared during the Rattanakosin period under King Rama IV, and it came to include votive tablets (originally from India) as part of the category of amulets.

== History ==
The origins of Thai Buddhist amulets trace back to votive tablets, which existed long before the modern notion of amulets. Buddhism entered present-day Thailand during the Dvaravati period, bringing the Indian tradition of creating votive tablets. In Dvaravati art, these tablets were created to perpetuate Buddhism, associated with doctrines such as the Five Disappearances (pañcāntaradhāna).

During the Srivijaya period, influenced by Mahayana Buddhism, votive tablets were created to dedicate merit to the deceased and accumulate merit toward becoming a bodhisattva. In the Ayutthaya period, tablets were increasingly used for auspiciousness, sanctity, and protection, with warriors carrying them into battle instead of talismans like phrajiat, takrut, or herbal charms.

In the early Rattanakosin period, protective amulets became highly popular. These votive tablets intended for supernatural protection and blessings came to be collectively called phra khrueang (amulets). They were also used to raise funds for temple operations; monks would give amulets as "gifts" in exchange for donations.

== Beliefs ==
Amulets are associated with multiple functions:

1. Protection from danger, black magic, and disasters.
2. Enhancement of wealth, career, and personal relationships.
3. Spiritual benefits such as peace of mind and merit accumulation.
4. Thai tradition also places amulets under stupas during construction. Over centuries, amulets are often discovered during the collapse of temple structures.

Amulets are typically made using plaster, metal, wood, or bone, sometimes containing ash, monk hair, or temple relics. Monks chant and bless them, a process that can take from a week to several years. Protective casings are often added, and amulet value depends on appearance, scarcity, maker, age, and reputed divine powers.

Famous markets for amulets include Tha Phrachan Market next to Thammasat University. Authentic amulets are rare and often require expert authentication. Forgeries are common, and collectors typically specialize in a particular type or temple origin.

== Famous Thai amulets ==
=== Benja Phakhi ===
The most famous of Thai amulets are the set of five rarest and highly sought after amulets Phra Somdej Wat Rakhang (Thai: พระสมเด็จวัดระฆัง), Phra Rod (Thai: พระรอด), Phra Nang Phaya (Thai: พระนางพญา), Phra Phong Suphan (Thai: พระผงสุพรรณ), and Phra Sum Kor (Thai: พระซุ้มกอ), together called Benja Phakhi (Thai: เบญจภาคี). They are valued at over 10 million baht.

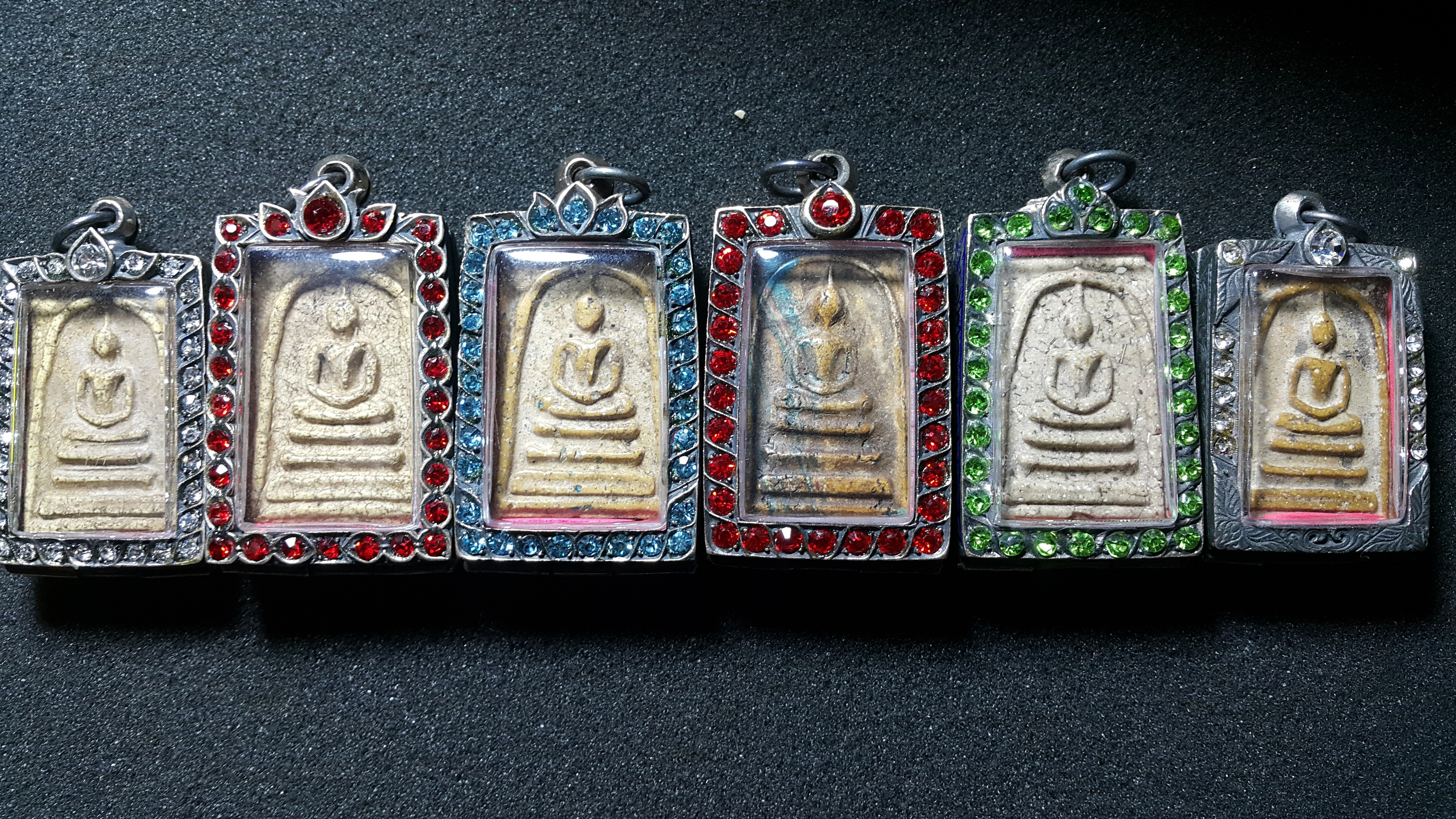
Somdej Wat Rakang 2401 - 2411

=== Phra Somdej ===
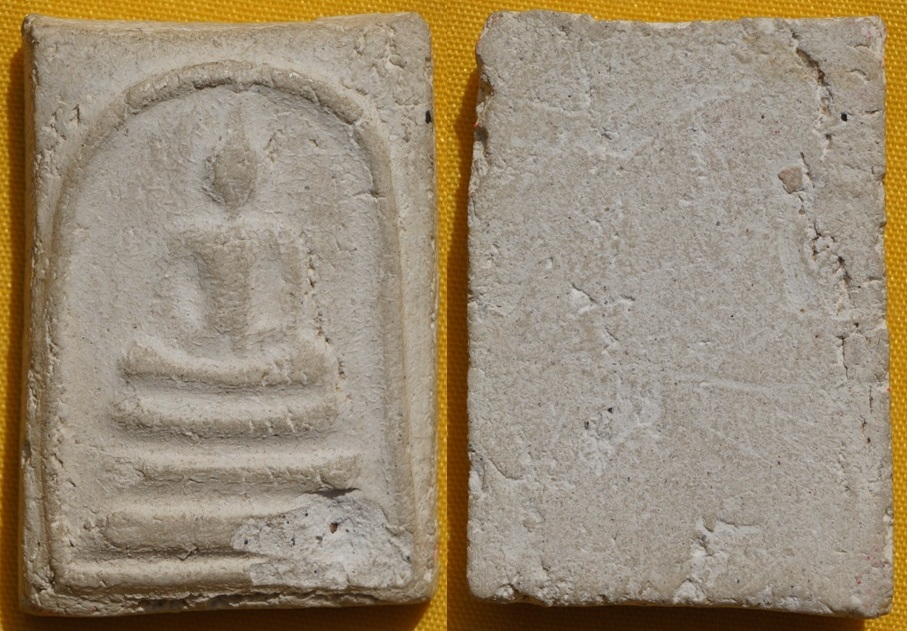
Phra Somdej from Wat Ratchayothaya

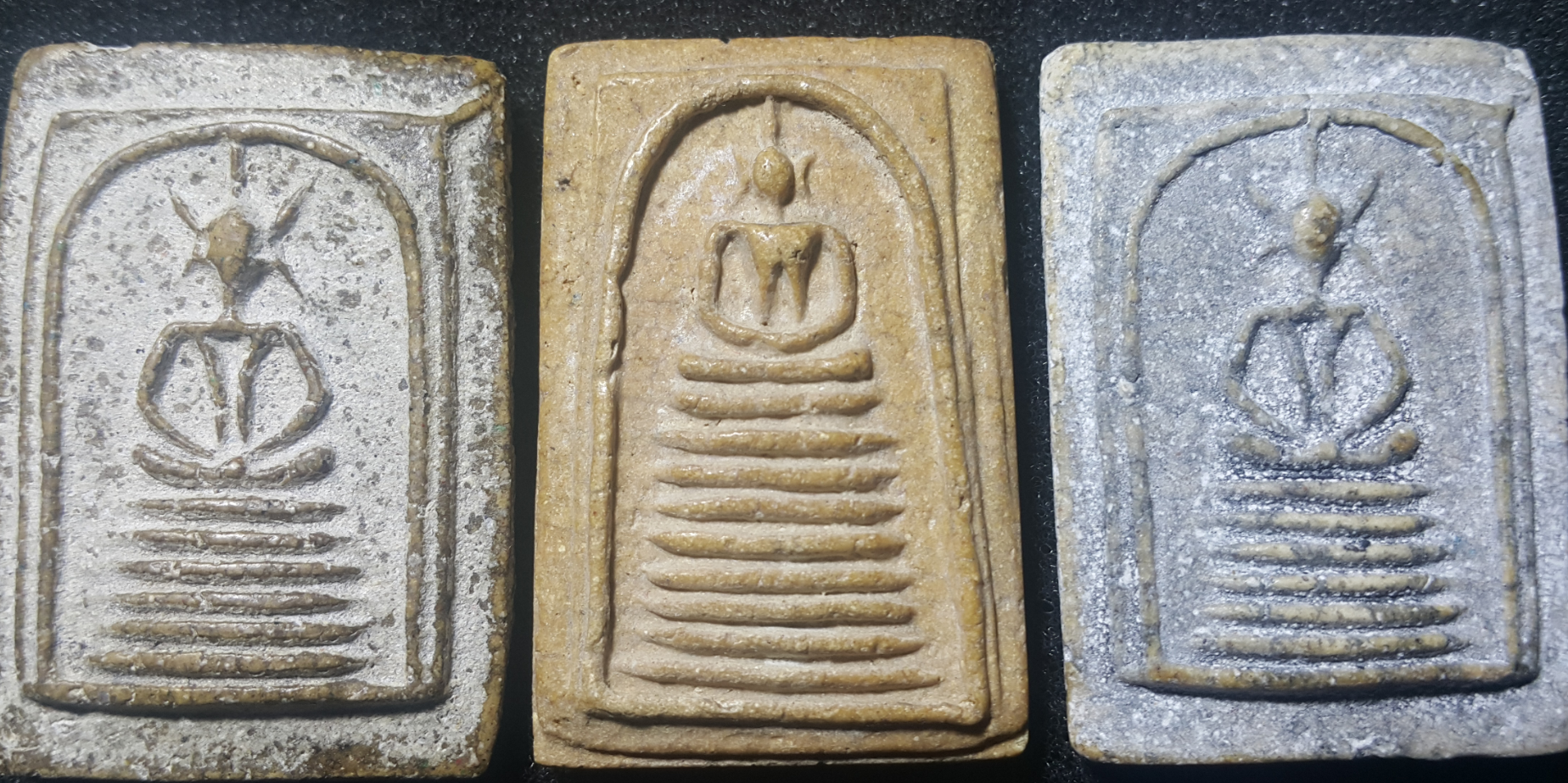
Somdej Wat Ketchaiyo (Ajarn Toh Era)

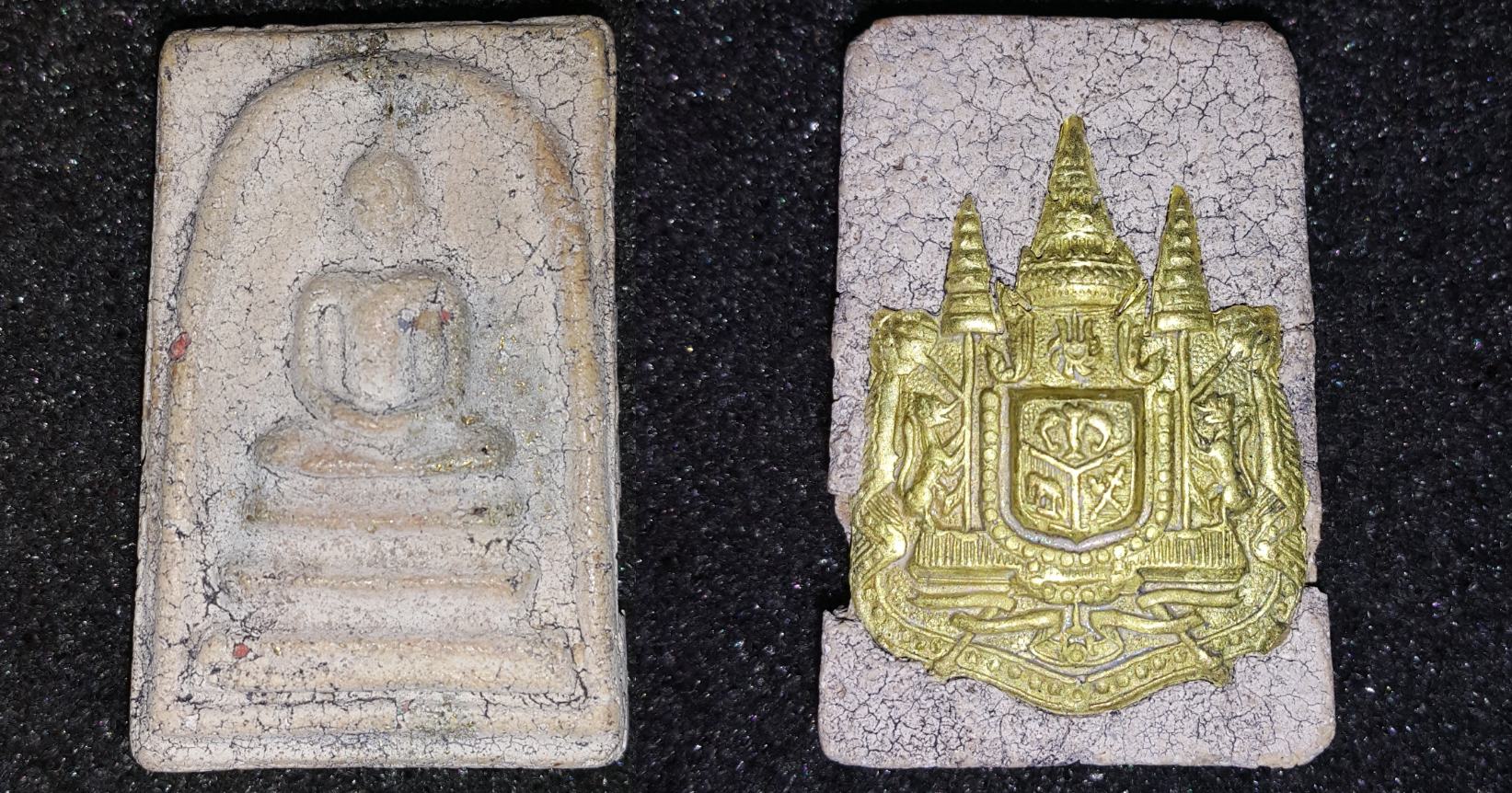
Somdej Nai Pao 2495

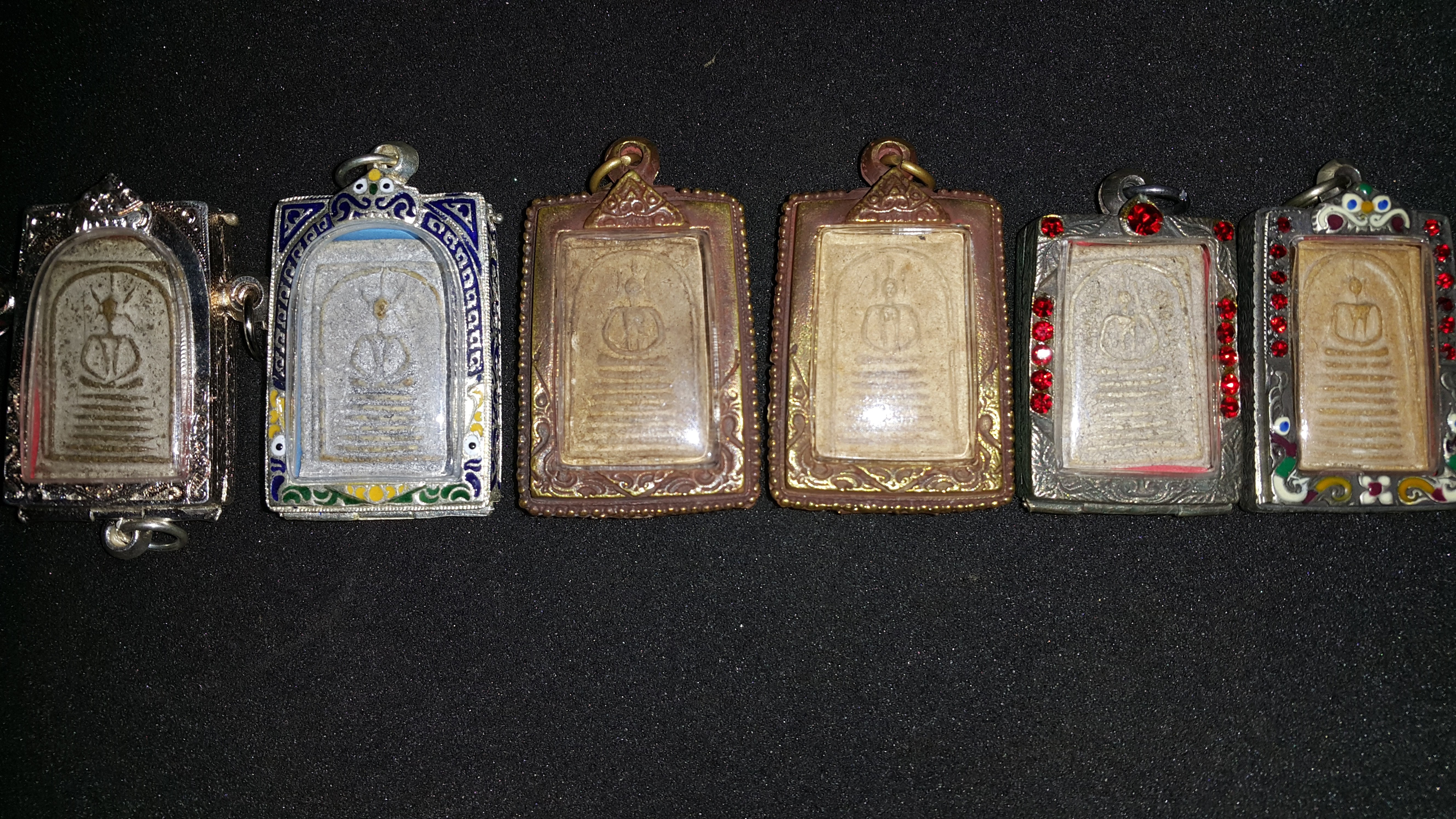
Somdej Wat Ketchaiyo

Phra Somdej (Thai: พระสมเด็จ) amulets are the "king of amulets", also known as "lucky amulets". Each amulet collector must have one and it is the best and foremost choice for the new believer in Thai amulets. Para Somdej has the noblest status in Buddhism. The most famous of this kind is the Phra Somdet Wat Rakhang produced around 1866 to 1871, by Somdej Toh of Wat Rakhang Khositaram (Thai: วัดระฆังโฆษิตาราม), who is also one of the most respected monks in Thailand.

Phra Somdet Jitlada are the amulets made by King Bhumibol himself and awarded from 1965 to 1970 to selected soldiers, policemen, government officers, and citizens. No more than 3,000 of these amulets were made. Each amulet is accompanied with certificate stating the name of the recipient, date, and amulet number. As of 2013, a Phra Somdet Jitlada is worth at least two million baht.

In general, most Phra Somdej amulets do not depict the eyes, nose, or mouth of the Buddha. The Buddha in Phra Somdej is seated on a three-level throne representing the three worlds system of Buddhist cosmology. Although the Phra Somdej has later appeared with five, seven, nine, ten, or thirteen level thrones, the concept of the throne is still the same. Like other Thai amulets, Phra Somdej is usually made of temple dirt, pollen, monk's hair as well as other relics from famous monks or the holy robe "cīvara" worn by the monk.

The functions of Phra Somdej amulets range from protection to enhanced personal relationships, better health, protection from black magic, blocking disasters, and to strengthen careers as well as adjusting the human aura field. Most importantly, it can help bring peace to different walks of life.

=== Phra Rod ===
Phra Rod refers to amulets discovered in the early King Chulalongkorn era inside a partially collapsed stupa in Wat Mahawan (Thai: วัดมหาวัน) in Lamphun province. It was named Phra Rod because the Buddha image in the amulet matched the ancient Buddha image in the temple's ubosot called Phra Rod Luang (Thai: พระรอดหลวง). Legends say that when the temple was part of Hariphunchai Kingdom, the amulets were crafted by Ruesi to hand out to citizens during wars and those remaining were placed inside the temple's stupa.

=== Phra Nang Phaya ===
Phra Nang Phaya amulets from Wat Nang Phaya in Phitsanulok province is believed to have been commissioned by Queen Wisutkasat of the Ayutthaya Kingdom. The amulet was discovered when workers dug up an area in the temple to prepare the stage for King Chulalongkorn's visit for the casting of a replica of famous Buddha image Phra Phuttha Chinnarat (Thai: พระพุทธชินราช). This amulet was also discovered in nearby temples such as Wat Ratchaburana (Thai: วัดราชบูรณะ).

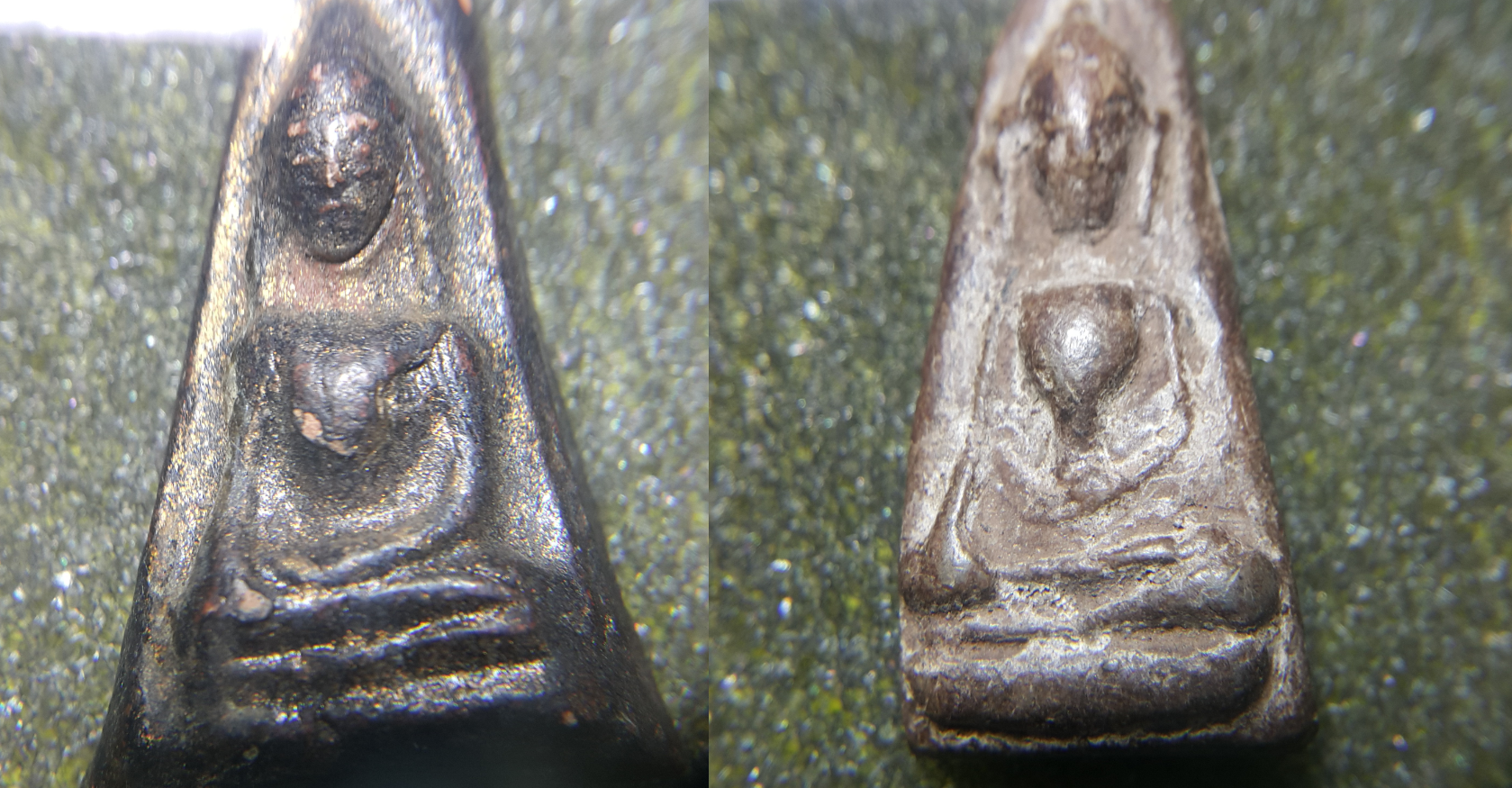
Phra Pong Suphan

=== Phra Phong Suphan ===
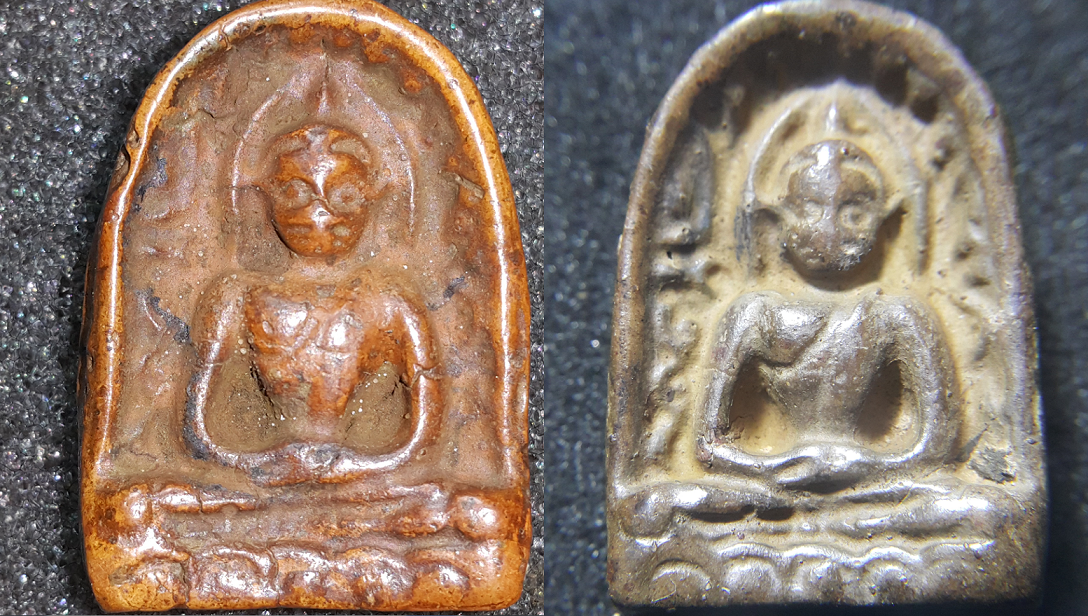
Phra Somkor

Phra Phong Suphan is from Wat Phra Si Rattana Mahathat (Thai: วัดพระศรีรัตนมหาธาตุ) of Suphanburi province. There were thieves who came to dig under the large stupa in the temple and stole amulets and tablets, some made of gold. In 1913 the Suphanburi governor ordered a formal dig to uncover buried amulets. Phra Phong Suphan was among the amulets found.

=== Phra Sum Kor ===
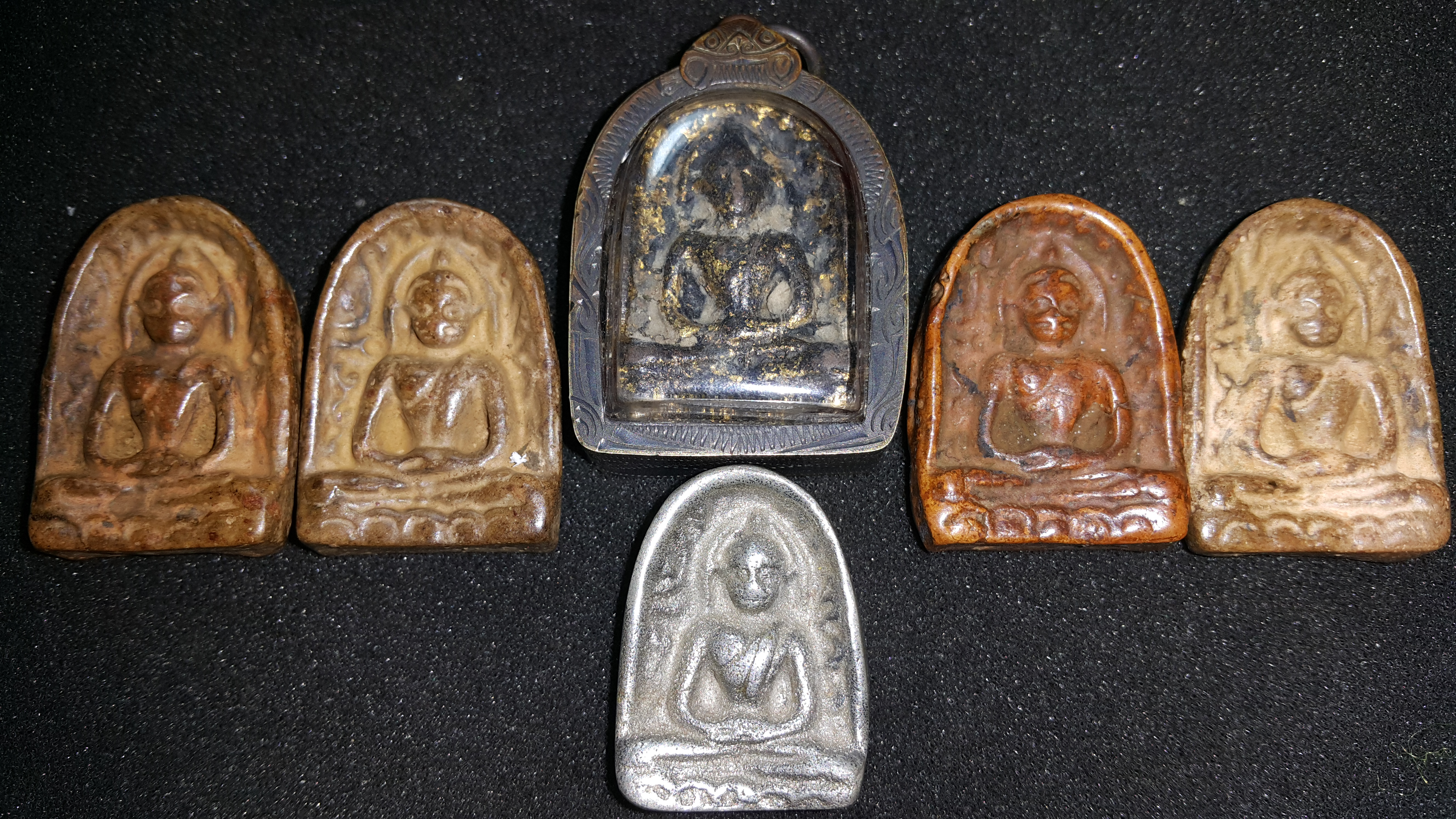
Phra Somkor

Phra Sum Kor is from Kamphaeng Phet province. When Somdej Toh came to visit relatives in 1849, he found Phra Sum Kor amulets at Wat Phraboromthat Nakhonchum (Thai: วัดพระบรมธาตุนครชุม) together with tablets explaining the amulet making process. He later used the instructions to make his own Phra Somdej Wat Rakhang. This amulet is found throughout Thung Sethi (Thai: ทุ่งเศรษฐี) in Kamphang Phet province.

=== Phra Khun Phaen ===
Khun Phaen amulet

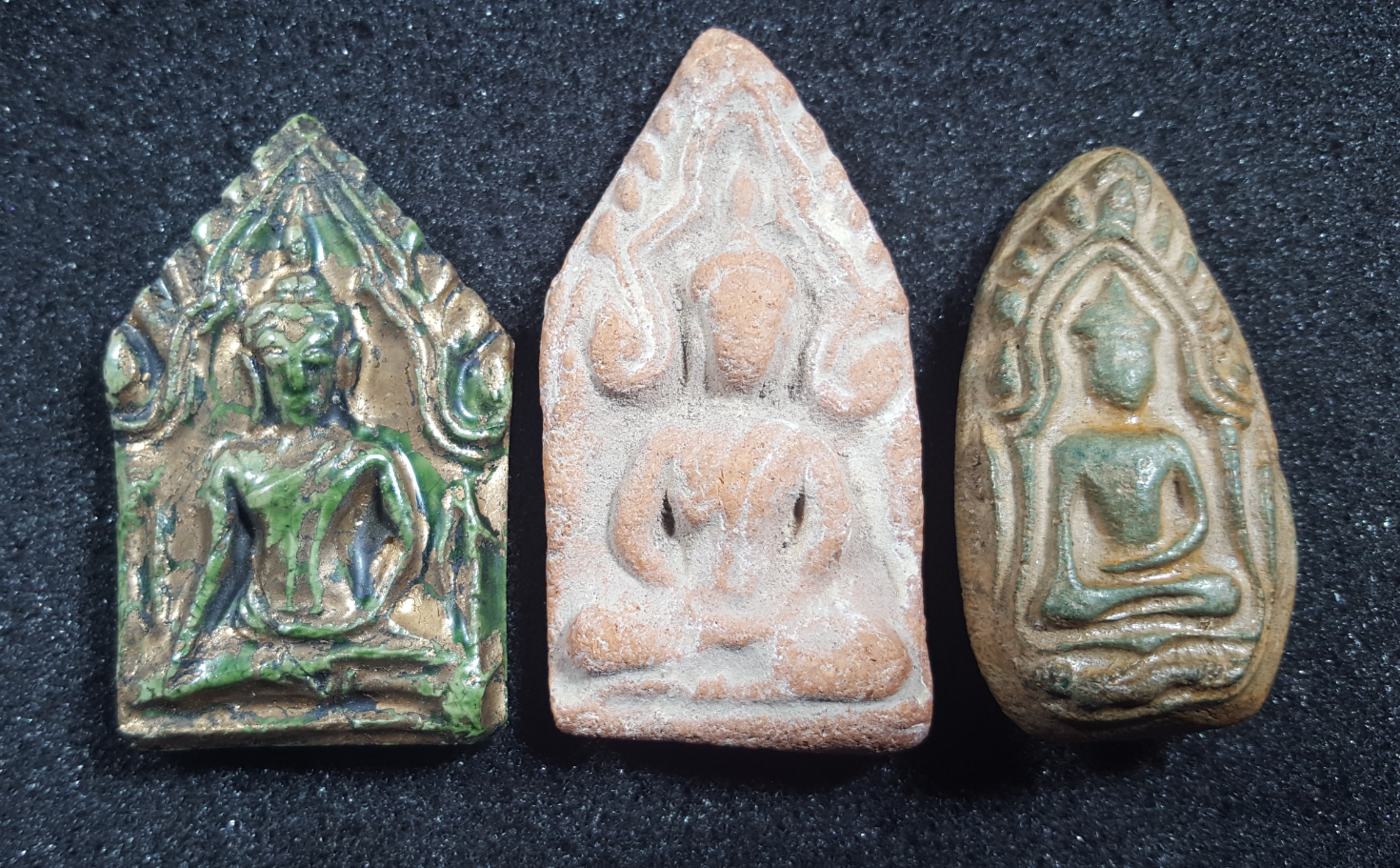
Khun Paen Wat Bang Krang

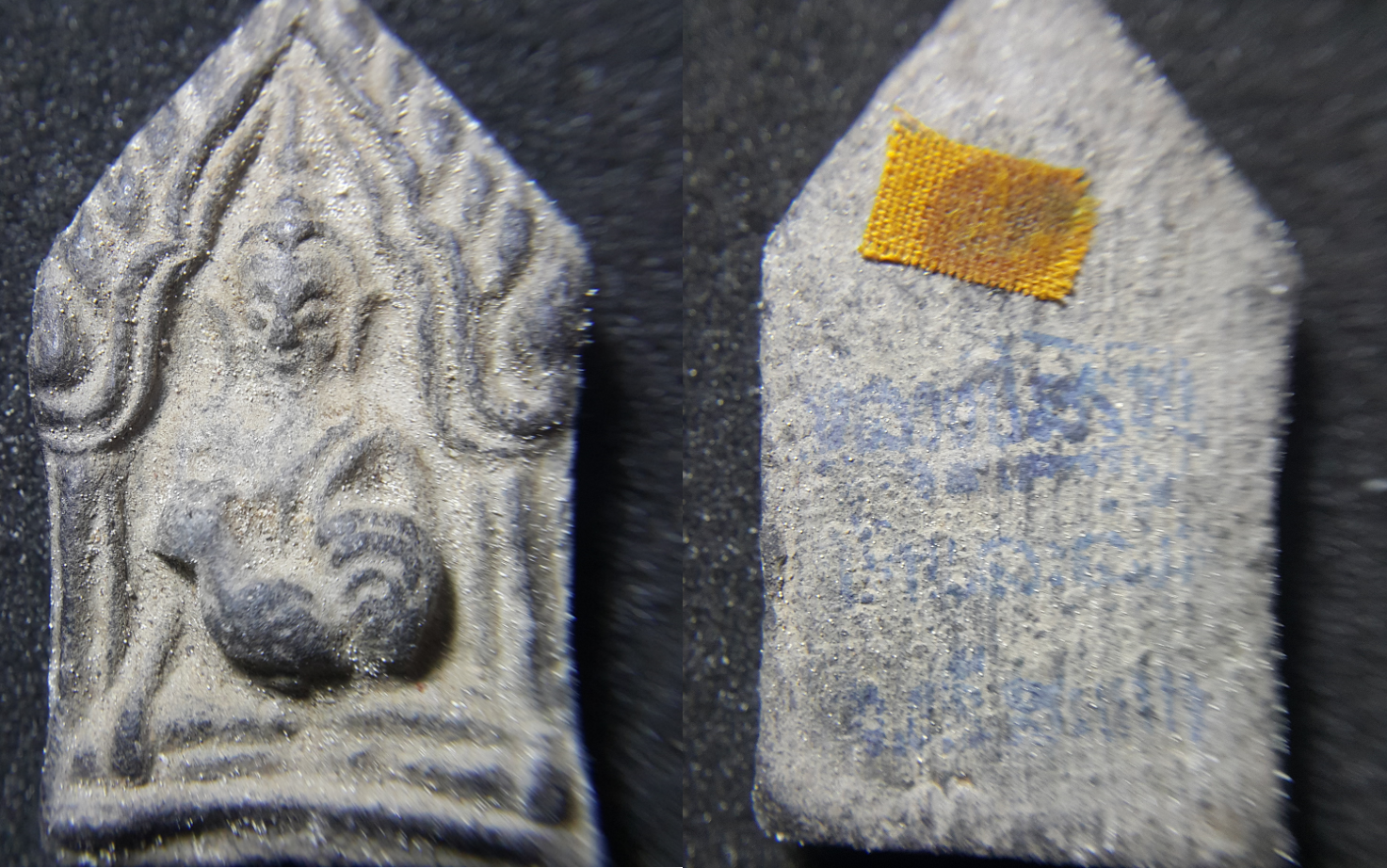
Luang Phor Suang Khun Paen 2519 with tiny Relics

Phra Khun Phaen (Thai: พระขุนแผน) are amulets which usually feature the Buddha in samadhi or other mudra and should not be confused with the "Khun Phaen" sans "phra", which are amulets made in the likeness of the Phra Khun Phaen, but with a separate deity/historical figure. The original Phra Khun Phaen amulets came before the Khun Phaen but the name is derived from the popularity of the Khun Phaen folklore of the time, and because there was no particular name given to the Phra Khun Phaen, the name was simply borrowed with the attached "phra" (พระ) to denote holiness. Khun Phaen are amulets with the image of Khun Phaen of the classic Khun Chang Khun Phaen folklore. According to the folklore, Khun Phaen was proficient in using magical powers including amulets and other items in battle. Khun Phaen also used a love formula to attract women. Thus, one of the main functions of Khun Phaen is to enhance human relationships: personal relationships, marriage and heterosexual relationships. Also, it helps to enhance career success. The Khun Phaen amulets range from near identical likeness to the Phra Khun Phaen to the more intricate molds containing imagery of the infamous Kumarn Tong (golden child) to Khun Paen and his many consorts.

=== Jatukham Rammathep ===
Jatukham Rammathep (Thai: จตุคามรามเทพ) is the name of two princes from Srivijaya Kingdom. Nakhon Si Thammarat province locals consider Jatukham and Rammthep as the guardian angels of the city. The Jatukham Rammathep amulet was first created by police Khun Phantharak Rajjadej (Thai: ขุนพันธรักษ์ราชเดช) in 1987 as part of Nakhon Si Thammarat's Lak Mueang establishment. The amulet is round, typically with the image of Hindu deities and around 5 cm in diameter. It became popular in the early-2000s, especially during the time of Khun Phantharak Rajjadej's funeral on 5 July 2006 till mid-2007. The amulet was believed to protect its owner from danger and to make its owner rich. As many as 150 series of Jatukham Rammathep amulet production were planned for the year 2007 and the value of market for the amulet reached 20 billion baht that year. In late-2007 it appeared that the Jatukham Rammathep amulet bubble had burst. Its popularity quickly faded with plenty of amulets left that could be obtained at low prices.

=== Phra Kring ===
The Phra Kring is a metallic statuette in the image of a meditating Buddha, which is only made in Thailand. The Phra Kring is essentially a Mahayana-style Buddha image, despite the fact that Thailand adheres to Theravada Buddhism. The beliefs about the powers of the Phra Kring, are that the Phra Kring is the image of Pra Pai Sachaya Kuru (พระไภษัชยคุรุ Bhaisajyaguru, 藥師佛 Yàoshīfó, in Chinese, or in Japanese 'Yakushi'), the medicine Buddha. The image is normally in the posture of sitting and holding an alms bowl or a guava, gourd or a vajra. This was a fully enlightened Buddha, who achieved purity of body and mind, and who was a great teacher of human beings, who has the miracle that he who hears his name in passing, or see his image, will be healed, and live a long healthy and prosperous life with wealthy standing. The Pra Kring Buddha, or Bhaisajyaguru is one of seven Bhaisajayagurus and is said to have two Bodhisattvas under him; Pra Suriya Bprapaa Potisat (Suriya Bhrapa Bodhisattva) and Pra Jantra Bprapaa Potisat (Chandra Bhrapa Bodhisattva). Of all the other Buddhist countries who revere it, only Thailand makes its amulet. The Phra Kring in most cases (except in the odd example where Muan Sarn powders prevent the sound), will have a rattling bead inside it. The reason for this rattle sound, made by a sacred bead of Chanuan Muan Sarn or other relic, is that it is the name of the medicine Buddha resounding, as you pass along your way, healing and blessing you with safety, health, prosperity, metta for auspicious friendly loving kindness. Some Phra Kring however do not make a sound that is audible to humans, but still have a piece of Chanuan within, which emits the name of the medicine Buddha silently, only audible on the spiritual plane.

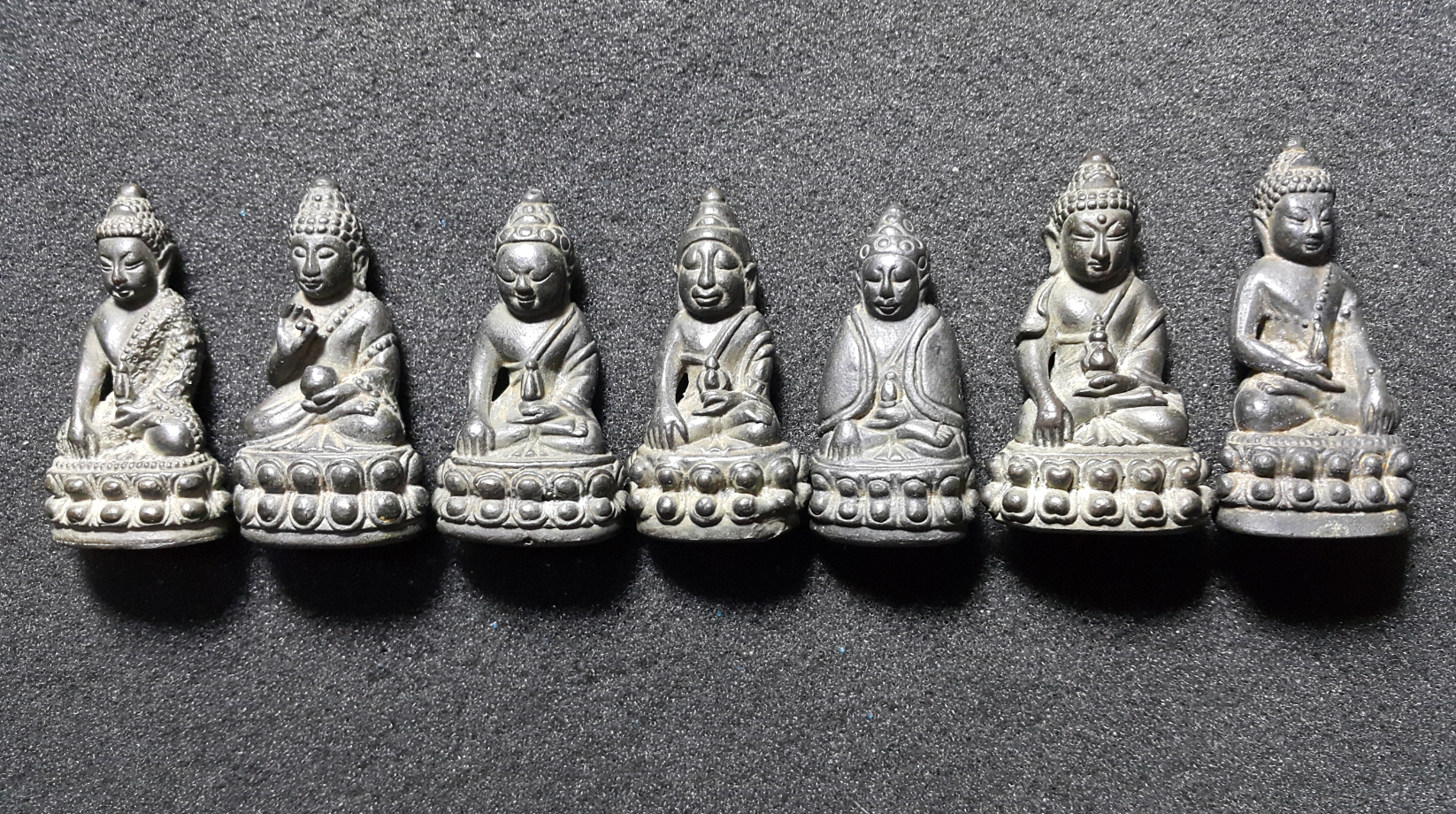
Phra Kring 2395 - 2411

== Amulet taboos ==
1. Do not wear Buddhist amulets under the waist. For most amulets, wear it on the neck or above the waist. This tradition is to show respect to the Buddha. Takruts, another type of amulet made in Thailand but without a monk or Buddhist image, can be put inside pants pockets.
2. Do not put a Buddhist amulet in a bedroom if you expect to engage in any sexual activity there.
3. Pray before and after wearing an amulet.
4. Remove amulets when bathing.

== Prayer ==
=== Vandana ===
Namo tassa bhagavato arahato samma sambuddhassa: This is a prayer to honor to the blessed one, the exalted one, the fully enlightened one. People usually say this prayer three times before and after wearing on the amulet. Saying this prayer means showing absolute respect to the Buddha. This prayer can also be said before and after meditation.

Buddhaṃ Ārādhanānaṃ, Dhammaṃ Ārādhanānaṃ, Sanghaṃ Ārādhanānaṃ (make a wish or prayer) Buddhaṃ pasiddhi mē, Dhammaṃ pasiddhi mē, Sanghaṃ pasiddhi mē: This is a special mantra or prayer in Pāli for praying to amulets to beseech blessings. It is called Kata Ārātanā Pra Krueang.

=== "Itipiso" Katha ===
1. Itipi so Bhagava (He is indeed the Exalted One)
2. Araham (far from defilements)
3. Samma Sambuddho (perfectly enlightened by Himself)
4. Vijjacaranasampanno (fully possessed of wisdom and excellent conduct)
5. Sugato Lokavidu (knower of the worlds)
6. Anuttaro Purisadhammasarathi Sattha (unexcelled Trainer of tamable men)
7. Devamanussanam (teacher of deities and men)
8. Buddho (the Awakened One)
9. Bhagava ti. (the Lord skilled in teaching Dhamma)

=== Metta Sutta ===
The Mettā Sutta is the name used for two Buddhist discourses (Pali: sutta) found in the Pali Canon. The one, more often chanted by Theravadin monks, is also referred to as Karaṇīyamettā Sutta after the opening word, Karaṇīyam, "(This is what) should be done.

1. Aham avero homi／May I be free from enmity and danger
2. abyapajjho homi／May I be free from mental suffering
3. anigha homi／May I be free from physical suffering
4. sukhi – attanam pariharami／May I take care of myself happily
5. Mama matapitu, acariya ca natimitta ca／May my parents, teacher, relat-ives and friends
6. sabrahma – carino ca／fellow Dhamma farers
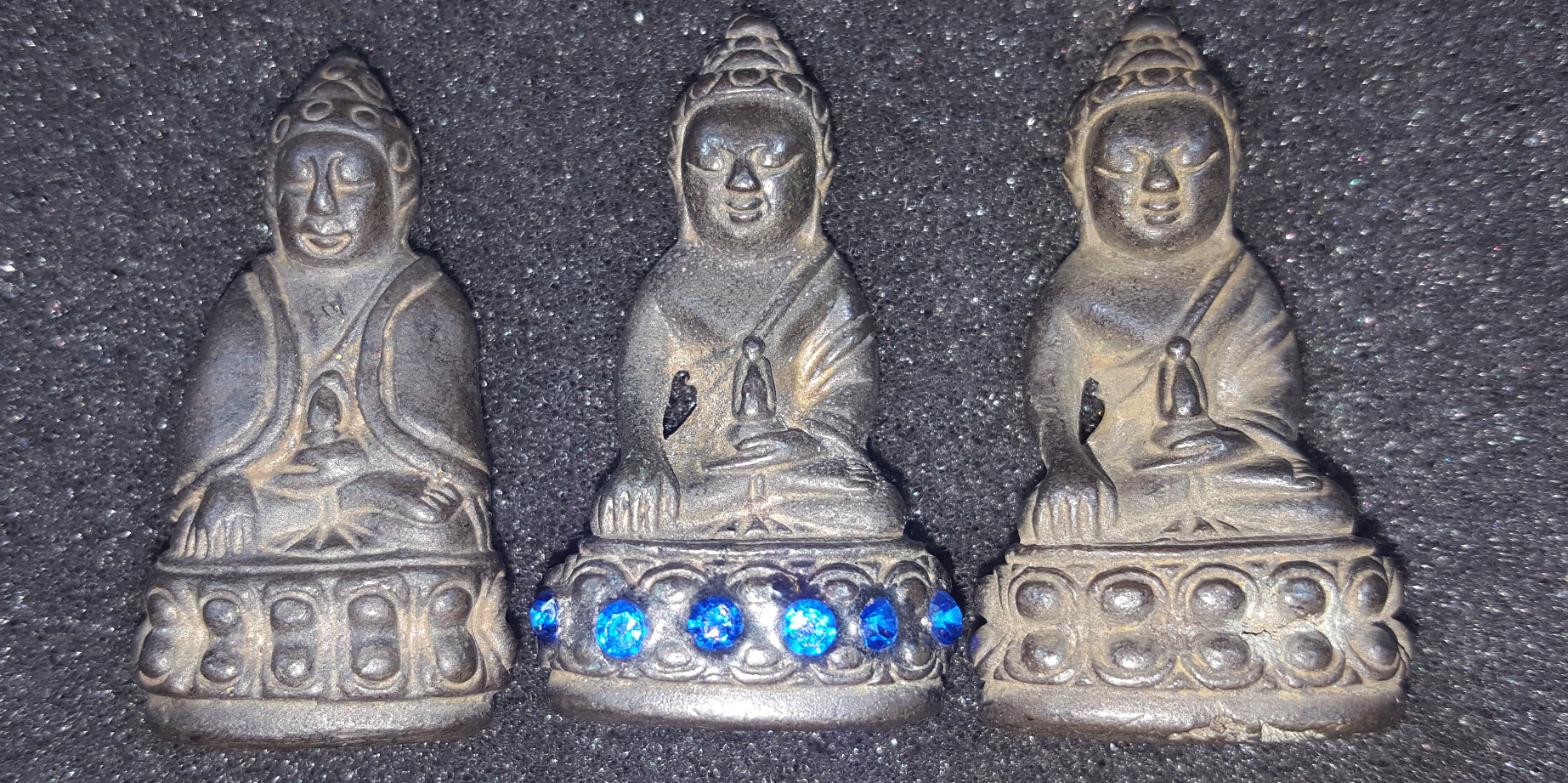
7. พระกริ่งปวเรศ Phra Kring Pawaret
  avera hontu／be free from enmity and danger
8. abyapajjha hontu／be free from mental suffering
9. anigha hontu／be free from physical suffering
10. sukhi – attanam pariharantu／may they take care of themselves happily
11. Imasmim arame sabbe yogino／May all meditators in this compound
12. avera hontu／be free from enmity and danger
13. abyapajjha hontu／be free from mental suffering
14. anigha hontu／be free from physical suffering
15. sukhi – attanam pariharantu /
16. May they take care of themselves happily
17. Imasmim arame sabbe bhikkhu / May all monks in this compound
18. samanera ca / novice monks
19. upasaka – upasikaya ca / laymen and laywomen disciples
20. avera hontu／be free from enmity and danger
21. abyapajjha hontu／be free from mental suffering
22. anigha hontu／be free from physical suffering
23. sukhi – attanam pariharantu／May they take care of themselves happily
24. Amhakam catupaccaya – dayaka／May our donors of the four supports: clothing, food, medicine and lodging
25. avera hontu／be free from enmity and danger
26. abyapajjha hontu／be free from mental suffering
27. anigha hontu／be free from physical suffering
28. sukhi – attanam pariharantu／May they take care of themselves happily
29. Amhakam arakkha devata／May our guardian devas
30. Ismasmim vihare／in this monastery
31. Ismasmim avase／in this dwelling
32. Ismasmim arame／in this compound
33. arakkha devata／May the guardian devas
34. avera hontu／be free from enmity and danger
35. abyapajjha hontu／be free from mental suffering
36. anigha hontu／be free from physical suffering
37. sukhi – attanam pariharantu／may they take care of themselves happily
38. Sabbe satta／May all beings
39. sabbe pana／all breathing things
40. sabbe bhutta／all creatures
41. sabbe puggala／all individuals (all beings)
42. sabbe attabhava – pariyapanna／all personalities (all beings with mind and body)
43. sabbe itthoyo／may all females
44. sabbe purisa／all males
45. sabbe ariya／all noble ones (saints)
46. sabbe anariya／all worldlings (those yet to attain sainthood)
47. sabbe deva／all devas (deities)
48. sabbe manussa／all humans
49. sabbe vinipatika／all those in the four woeful planes
50. avera hontu／be free from enmity and dangers
51. abyapajjha hontu／be free from mental suffering
52. anigha hontu／be free from physical suffering
53. sukhi – attanam pariharantu／may they take care of themselves happily
54. Dukkha muccantu／May all being be free from suffering
55. Yattha-laddha-sampattito mavigacchantu／May whatever they have gained not be lost
56. Kammassaka／All beings are owners of their own Kamma
57. Purathimaya disaya／in the eastern direction
58. pacchimaya disaya／in the western direction
59. uttara disaya／in the northern direction
60. dakkhinaya disaya／in the southern direction
61. purathimaya anudisaya／in the southeast direction
62. pacchimaya anudisaya／in the northwest direction
63. uttara anudisaya／in the northeast direction
64. dakkhinaya anudisaya／in the southwest direction
65. hetthimaya disaya／in the direction below
66. uparimaya disaya／in the direction above
67. Sabbe satta／May all beings
68. sabbe pana／all breathing things
69. sabbe bhutta／all creatures
70. sabbe puggala／all individuals (all beings)
71. sabbe attabhava – pariyapanna／all personalities (all beings with mind and body)
72. sabbe itthoyo／may all females
73. sabbe purisa／all males
74. sabbe ariya／all noble ones (saints)
75. sabbe anariya／(those yet to attain sainthood)
76. sabbe deva／all devas (deities)
77. sabbe manussa／all humans
78. sabbe vinipatika／all those in the 4 woeful planes
79. avera hontu／be free from enmity and dangers
80. abyapajjha hontu／be free from mental suffering
81. anigha hontu／be free from physical suffering
82. sukhi – attanam pariharantu／may they take care of themselves happily
83. Dukkha muccantu／May all beings be free from suffering
84. Yattha-laddha-sampattito mavigacchantu／May whatever they have gained not be lost
85. Kammassaka／All beings are owners of their own kamma
86. Uddham yava bhavagga ca／As far as the highest plane of existence
87. adho yava aviccito／to as far down as the lowest plane
88. samanta cakkavalesu／in the entire universe
89. ye satta pathavicara／whatever beings that move on earth
90. abyapajjha nivera ca／may they are free of mental suffering and enmity
91. nidukkha ca nupaddava／and from physical suffering and danger
92. Uddham yava bhavagga ca／As far as the highest plane of existence
93. adho yava aviccito／to as far down as the lowest plane
94. samanta cakkavalesu／in the entire universe
95. ye satta udakecara／whatever beings that move on water
96. abyapajjha nivera ca／may they are free of mental suffering and enmity
97. nidukkha ca nupaddava／and from physical suffering and danger

== See also ==
- Cetiya
- Fulu
- Jinapañjara
- Maṅgala Sutta
- Ofuda and omamori
- Palad khik
- Paritta
- Ratana Sutta
- Sacca-kiriya
- Takrut
