= Sepha =

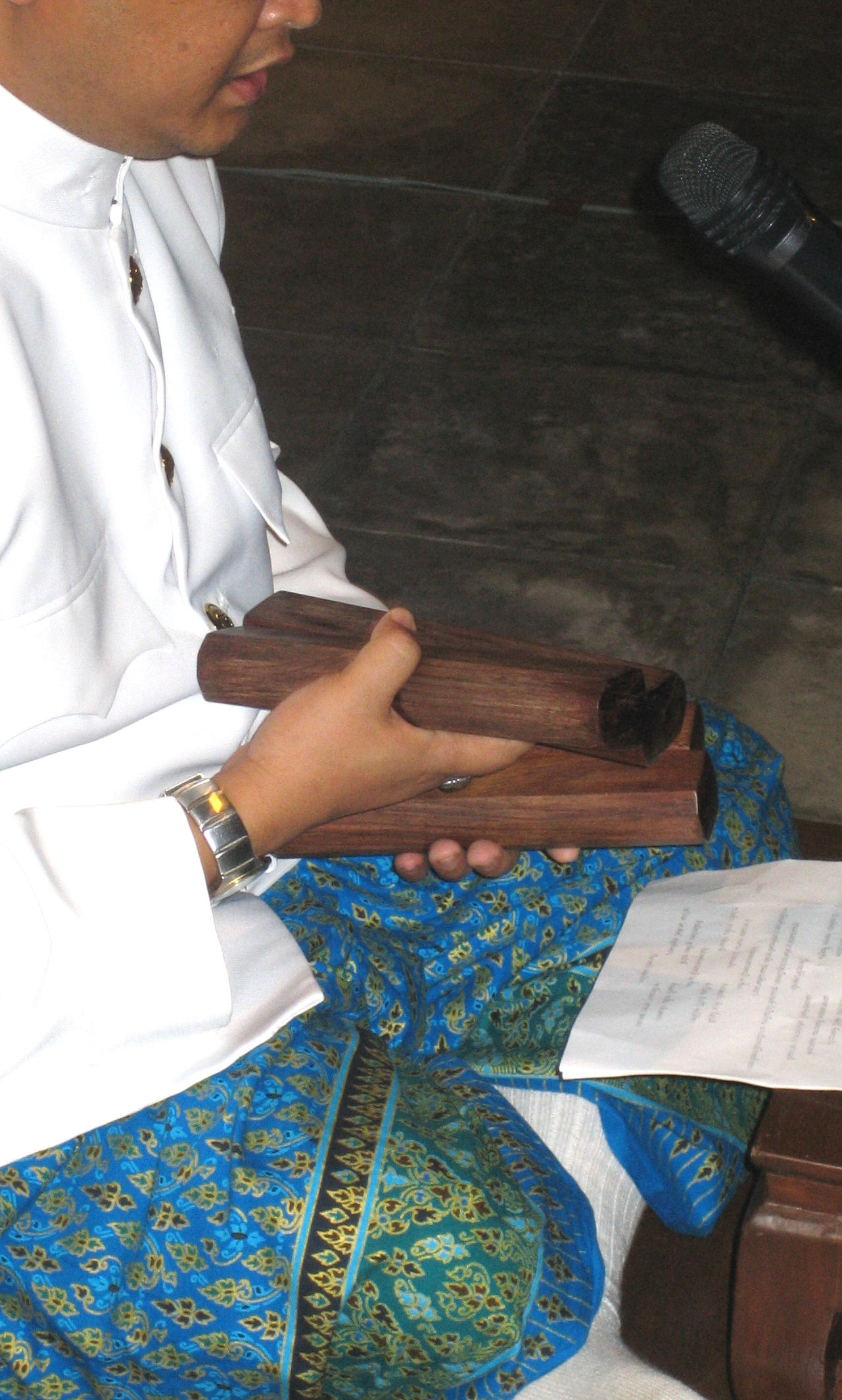
Sepha performance, showing krap

Sepha (Thai: เสภา, pronounced [sěː.pʰāː]) is a genre of Thai poetic storytelling that had its origins in the performances of troubadours who stylized recitations were accompanied by two small clappers, sticks of wood (called in Thai krap sepha and in Khmer Krap chmol) to give rhythm and emphasis. The etymology of the word sepha is disputed.

== Origins ==
The sepha genre was developed by troubadours who recited episodes for local audiences, and passed on stories by word-of-mouth. By the eighteenth century, such performances had become the most popular form of entertainment in Siam. The troubadours told the story in stylized recitation, using two small sticks of wood (krap) to give rhythm and emphasis. The performances typically lasted a full night. This genre later became known as sepha.

== Etymology ==
The origin of the term Sepha is disputed. There is a musical form of the same name, but this seems unconnected. Kukrit Pramoj thought that sepha meant a jail and that the genre was developed by convicts in jail. Sujit Wongthet argued a connection to the Sanskrit word sewa, indicating some original association with ritual. The genre sepha was confined to episodes of Khun Chang Khun Phaen until the Fourth Reign (1851–1868), when parts of the royal chronicles and a few other works were rendered in this form on royal commission.
