= Kuman Thong (film) =

Filipino film

- Theatrical release poster
- Directed by: Xian Lim
- Written by: Xian Lim; Iris Lee
- Story by: Xian Lim
- Produced by: Vincent Del Rosario III; Valerie Del Rosario; Veronique Del Rosario-Corpus
- Starring: Cindy Miranda; Max Nattapol; Althea Ruedas
- Cinematography: Lee Mariano
- Edited by: Roy Francia
- Music by: Emerzon Texon
- Production companies: Studio Viva; Viva Films
- Distributed by: Viva Films
- Release date: July 3, 2024
- Country: Philippines
- Languages: Filipino; Thai

Kuman Thong (also known as Kuman Thong: Black Magic Baby) is a 2024 Philippine horror drama film written and directed by Xian Lim co-written by Iris Lee. It stars Filipino actresses Cindy Miranda, Althea Ruedas and Thai actor Max Nattapol. The film is about a mother who loses her son in a tragedy and she wanted to bring him back.

== Synopsis ==
A mother resorts to a Kuman Thong statue in a bid to revive her deceased son, however things did not go as intended.

== Cast ==
- Cindy Miranda as a mother who turns to Kuman Thong to revive her dead son.
- Max Nattapol
- Althea Ruedas
- Jariya Therakaosal
- Emman Esquivel

== Production ==
April 2, 2024, in an Instagram post Xian Lim posted a teaser of his new film project. The film was written and directed by Lim and his girlfriend Iris Lee was one of the producers of the film. The film Kuman Thong would be the third project for Lim as a director who is more known as an actor. It is also his first directorial horror film credit.

The film was shot entirely in Thailand in Bangkok and Ayutthaya. Principal photography took place from April 28 to May 6, 2024.

The film is based on the Kuman Thong of Thai folk religion, which are artifacts made from stillborn babies and is believed to bring good luck to its owners if properly venerated. Lim compared the Kuman Thong to the tiyanak in the Philippines which are inherently malevolent as opposed to the former.

== Release ==
The film was released in the Philippines on July 3, 2024, under Viva Films.

== Reception ==
The movie received a score of 45/100 from 8 reviews according to review aggregator website Kritikultura, indicating a mixed reception.
