= Koan kroach =

Esoteric Khmer amulet

The koan kroach (Khmer: កូនក្រក, literally dried child) is an esoteric Khmer amulet made from mummified fetuses "obtained from the forced removal of the fetus from a wife in her first pregnancy".

== Description ==
The veneration of koan kroach, somewhat similar to the kuman thong in neighboring Thailand, is not part of mainstream Buddhist practices, but it is popular in Cambodia.

=== A Khmer amulet obtained from child and mother sacrifice ===
Koan kroach can be obtained either from a woman who has died in childbirth, or from a living pregnant woman. In the first case, the man has to awaken the corpse of the woman (who has been buried with the fetus) by magic. He must then ask and receive the dead woman's permission to take the fetus. According to the ritual, the man seeking the amulet would "elicit the words "it belongs to you" from the mother, after which he would remove the fetus from the womb, killing the mother, dry it and wear the remains in a bag around his neck". The dead fetus is flattened, similar to a fetus papyraceus, and it is dried out over a fire. The amulet thus created is generally worn in a small wooden ball of two halves (danlap) around the neck.

Overcoming fear is a major factor in the creation of the amulet. In both cases, its creation requires not only the death of the fetus but also of the mother as the aborted fetus is adopted by the owner of the amulet.

Its power is thought to be multiplied by leaving it for a while in front of the principal Buddharupa image of a voat monastery. Again the power is even greater when the ritual takes place in seven different monasteries.

=== A symbol of power and violence ===
The man (owner of the amulet) is usually a soldier; the woman (mother) may be his mistress or wife; the fetus must be a first child and as the mother is either dead or, more often, about to die, also an only child. The amulet is supposed to grant supernatural powers, and even invulnerability in battle. The relationship between the owner and the amulet, extremely violent from its beginning, continues to be so, as the amulet can receive sacrifices to be fed from, or suffer being stained with a needle if the blessings prayed for are not received.

== Historical practice ==
There is a long tradition of the use of fetal amulets, or koan kroach, in Cambodian history. French ethnologist Etienne Aymonier is the first foreigner to report the practice in Cambodia. As thus, he reports that in-laws would avoid keeping a young couple too far during the first pregnancy to protect the pregnant mother and her baby in the womb. Ang Choulean has noted that the use of koan kroach tends to be greater during periods of national instability.

=== The legendary protection of Rasmei ===
One of Cambodia’s most infamous modern bandits, Rasmei, was rumored to have been protected by a pair of these mummified fetuses. A pair, and especially twins, is believed to be the ultimate in power. Legend had it that Rasmei could outrun police and pull off his daring robberies without fear because the koan kroach warned him in advance if he would be successful and told him when the police were getting close. They can even help the bearer become invisible, according to believers.

Rasmei was eventually shot dead resisting arrest, but the reason why his grisly accomplices failed to help him on this occasion remain unclear. Some say one of his men had stolen them the night before and left him vulnerable and bereft of his powers.

=== Use during the Khmer Civil War and the Khmer Rouge regime ===
The preexisting cultural practice of koan kroach meant that pregnant women were targeted during the Civil War in Cambodia in order to obtain supernatural powers.

According to British author Norman Lewis, who traveled extensively throughout Indochina, Issarak nationalists were "well armed with fetus amulets and automatic weapons.” While it is reported that Lon Nol himself owned a koan kroach amulet, the Khmer rouges cadres also fancied their supposed supernatural powers.

== Popular culture ==
The koan kroach amulet is still very present in contemporary Khmer popular culture, especially as a scary song or a ghost story.

An investigation into the death of a Khmer woman in Angkor apparently killed for the purpose of a ‘’koan kroach’’ serves as the plot for the novel ‘’Le Saut du Varan’’ published in 2006 by French author François Bizot.

On November 9, 2018, a blockbuster horror movie entitled "Koan Kroach" was released to cinemas in Cambodia but was blocked from advertising online by major social networks and platforms such as Facebook or YouTube, considering the high level of violence displayed against women in the movie. Producer Pek Mey defended himself saying that the movie did not intend to encourage viewers to practice or commit evil acts to kill a pregnant woman, but just wanted to inform about this occult practice.

== See also ==
- Folk religion
- Kuman Thong
- Good luck charm
- Holy Innocents
