= Jatukham Rammathep =

Buddhist amulet from Thailand

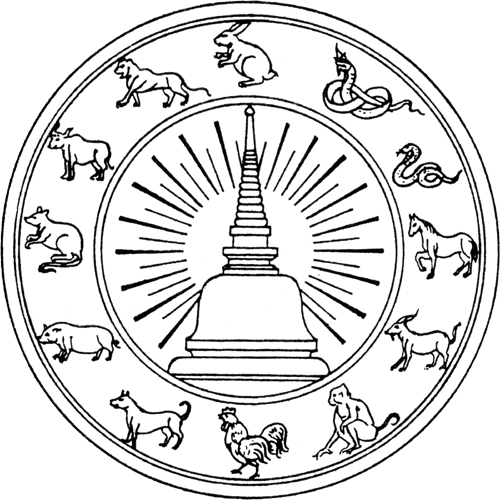
The official seal of Nakhon Si Thammarat Province, depicting the Phra Borommathat Chedi

Jatukam Ramathep (จตุคามรามเทพ) refers to the guardian deities of Wat Phra Mahathat Woramahawihan in Nakhon Si Thammarat Province, Originally, egarded as high-ranking deities found throughout various regions of Thailand. However, when Buddhism spread throughout Southeast Asia, their status was transformed into divine guardians of the Great Relic Stupa. Their names were changed to auspicious forms — becoming Thao Jatukam — His image is on the door (right side), which has existed for thousands of years. In 1987 (BE 2530), during the ceremony to reestablish the city horoscope of Nakhon Si Thammarat, the images of Jatukam Ramathep were invited to preside over the event — marking the beginning of modern worship.

== Meaning and belief ==
The people of Nakhon Si Thammarat believe that Jatukam is the supreme guardian god of the city. In Pali, the term catu means “four,” and gama means “village” or “territory.” Together, Jatukam symbolizes the four directions of the realm — which means four-direction protection (Cātummahārāja). Hence, the name signifies “the lord who rules over the four directions,” a position of supreme authority and protection over the city.

It is rumored but not confirmed that Jatukam Ramathep was originally a king of the Nakhon Si Thammarat Kingdom, so some myth-saying they are deities of two princes from Sri Lanka protecting the sacred relic. However, the statues builded to worship the relic were a prince and a princess.

Originally, the shrine contained one deity — Thao Jatukam Ramthep — a single divine figure: Jatukam Ramathep. however people starts spreading rumors saying they are two princes which is incorrect. Thus, Jatukam Ramathep represents the divine spirit of an ancient monarch who became a celestial protector of the four directions, possessing immense power and the ten perfections (pāramitā) of a Bodhisattva, filled with compassion for all beings.

Jatukam Ramathep is believed to have two general warrior attendants: Phaya Ching Chai, Pitta Pang Pra Kan, — he also has a teacher/advisor named Tak Khunhoon. who is expert in astyrology and wind-water heroes who helped defeat the Brahmins who once ruled the land.

Today, Jatukam Ramathep is widely revered as a deity possessing supernatural power in all aspects. An inscription from Srivijaya describes him as having “radiance like the sun and moon, dispelling the world’s darkness.”

To make a wish or prayer to him, three principles must be observed:

1. Pray only for things that are possible and morally sound.
2. Once a wish is granted, keep the promise made to the deity.
3. Perform acts of merit in dedication to Jatukam Ramathep.

Most importantly, one must not rely solely on prayers — one must also cultivate goodness through generosity (dāna), morality (sīla), and meditation (bhāvanā).

The image of Jatukam Ramathep is typically depicted as a four-armed celestial being holding divine weapons, seated in a meditative posture. each with four arms wielding weapons, in line with the Srivijaya art tradition of using symbolic imagery.

== History ==
The first discovery, Jatukam Ramathep was founded in 1985 (BE 2528) by Col. General Samphet Tharmathiku when he went to the temple Wat Nan Phaya for thong Kartin, and he was called upon by the female medium (mdm Joem), who was possessed by Mae Nam Phaya when devotees were there asking for lottery number.

Her instruction was short and simple; she said that she had waited for him for thousands of years just to wait for him to build a city pillar shrine for the villagers. At first, Khun Samphet doesn't really believe her, even though she said all his information out correctly. but by the next day khun samphet felt uneasy that why a person whom he ever met knew about him, so he return back to the temple to look for the medium again but she was nowhere to be found.

Then Khun Samphet went to look for one of his friends, Ajarn Kiat and told him about this encounter. Ajarn Kiat knew a Chinese medium selling buns called Ah Pong (KoPong) and suggested letting KoPong try it out; this time another deity came, Phaya Ching Chai. he too said the same story: that they have been waiting for Khun Samphet for thousands of years just for him to build a city pillar shrine. he even drew a pakyant for Samphet before leaving, and then another deity came to Kopong; this deity was none other than Jatukam Ramathe. However, he didn't identify himself but said just to call him "you you me me".

After many pursuits of questions, he finally told Samphet to take a pen and paper and draw his pose and show it to Long Mustache (nick name of Khun Phan), and then they finally knew his identity as Tao Jatukam Ramathep

the first batch of amulet was created in 1987 (BE 2530), known as the “Sun–Moon Rahu Medallion.” The design featured eight Rahus encircling a central figure of a two-faced, four-armed deity — symbolizing Avalokiteśvara as the divine representation of Jatukam Ramathep.

In 1995 (BE 2538), a total solar eclipse crossed Thailand, sparking public interest in Rahu and celestial omens. Many people began seeking protective amulets to ward off misfortune, and the Krung Siam Amulet Magazine publicized the Jatukam Ramathep image, leading to renewed recognition and limited circulation.

By early 1987 (BE 2530), Jatukam Ramathep had become a nationwide phenomenon following the royal cremation of Khun Phantharak Ratchadet, a famous police officer who co-founded the first generation of Jatukam Ramathep amulets with Police Lieutenant General Sanphet Thammathikul as chairman and the person chosen by Jatukam himself to create the City Pillar. Numerous temples across Thailand began producing and consecrating Jatukam Ramathep amulets in various editions. Demand was so intense that violent disputes and even murder (stomping) occurred. During this period, the price of the original 1987 medallion surged from just 49 baht to over 40 million baht.

The phenomenon transformed from religious devotion into commercialism and a social fashion. Nearly a thousand variations of Jatukam Ramathep amulets were produced and blessed almost daily in temples nationwide. They were sold not only in religious markets but also in restaurants, hotels, malls, and corporate offices — both for charity and profit.

According to Thailand’s Fiscal Policy Office (FPO), the total economic circulation generated by Jatukam Ramathep amulets was estimated at 22 billion baht, contributing 0.1–0.2% to Thailand’s GDP during an economic slowdown. This boom even led the Revenue Department to consider imposing taxes on the production and trade of Jatukam Ramathep amulets.

== Prayer to jatukam ramathep ==
To worship, one should first calm the mind and chant: Namo tassa bhagavato arahato sammā-sambuddhassa (three times), then recite the following verse:

Chatukam Rāmathevaṃ Bodhisattaṃ Mahāguṇaṃ Mahiddhikaṃ Ahaṃ Pūjemi, Siddhilābho Nirantharaṃ Namo Buddhāya.

Translation: “I pay homage to Jatukam Ramathep Bodhisattva, the greatly virtuous and powerful one. May success and prosperity eternally come to me. Homage to the Buddha.”

== See also ==
- Thai amulets
