= Por Intharapalit =

Thai writer

Por Intharapalit ป. อินทรปาลิต
- Born: Pricha Intharapalit ปรีชา อินทรปาลิต; 12 May 1910
- Died: 25 September 1968 (aged 58)
- Occupation: Writer

Por Intharapalit (Thai: ป. อินทรปาลิต) was the pen name of Pricha Intharapalit (Thai: ปรีชา อินทรปาลิต; 12 May 1910 – 25 September 1968), a Thai humorist and writer. Among his works was the Samgler (Thai: สามเกลอ, lit. 'three chums') series of comic short stories, of which he wrote nearly 2,000. He also wrote a novelisation of the battle of Bang Rajan. These works have been cited by Thai scholars among the 100 books that must be read by Thais.

The first book in the Samgler series, Ai Phuying (Thai: อายผู้หญิง; lit. 'shy around women'), was written in 1938, and immediately became a best-seller, selling 20,000 copies in its first week. The stories all revolve around three playboy friends and their families. The series seen by historians and literary experts as providing witty glimpses of Bangkok high society from 1938 to 1968, making the mention over the decades of actual restaurants, nightclubs, and celebrities.
