= Art & Culture =

- Publisher: Matichon Group
- Founder: Sujit Wongthes
- Founded: 1979
- Country: Thailand
- Language: Thai
- Website: silpa-mag.com
- ISSN: 0125-3654

Silpa Wattanatham (Thai: ศิลปวัฒนธรรม, RTGS: Sinlapa Watthanatham), known in English as Art & Culture, is a Thai history magazine and publishing imprint of the Matichon Group. Founded by Sujit Wongthes in 1979, the magazine popularized Thai history and opened up the field—previously confined to academic circles—to a wider public audience.

Writers associated with the magazine, most prominently Sujit, Srisakara Vallibhotama, and Dhida Saraya, challenged the established narrative of Thai history that emphasized the migration of the Tai peoples from southern China. Instead, they highlighted the diversity of Thailand’s cultural origins.
