= Krap =

Southeast Asian percussion instrument

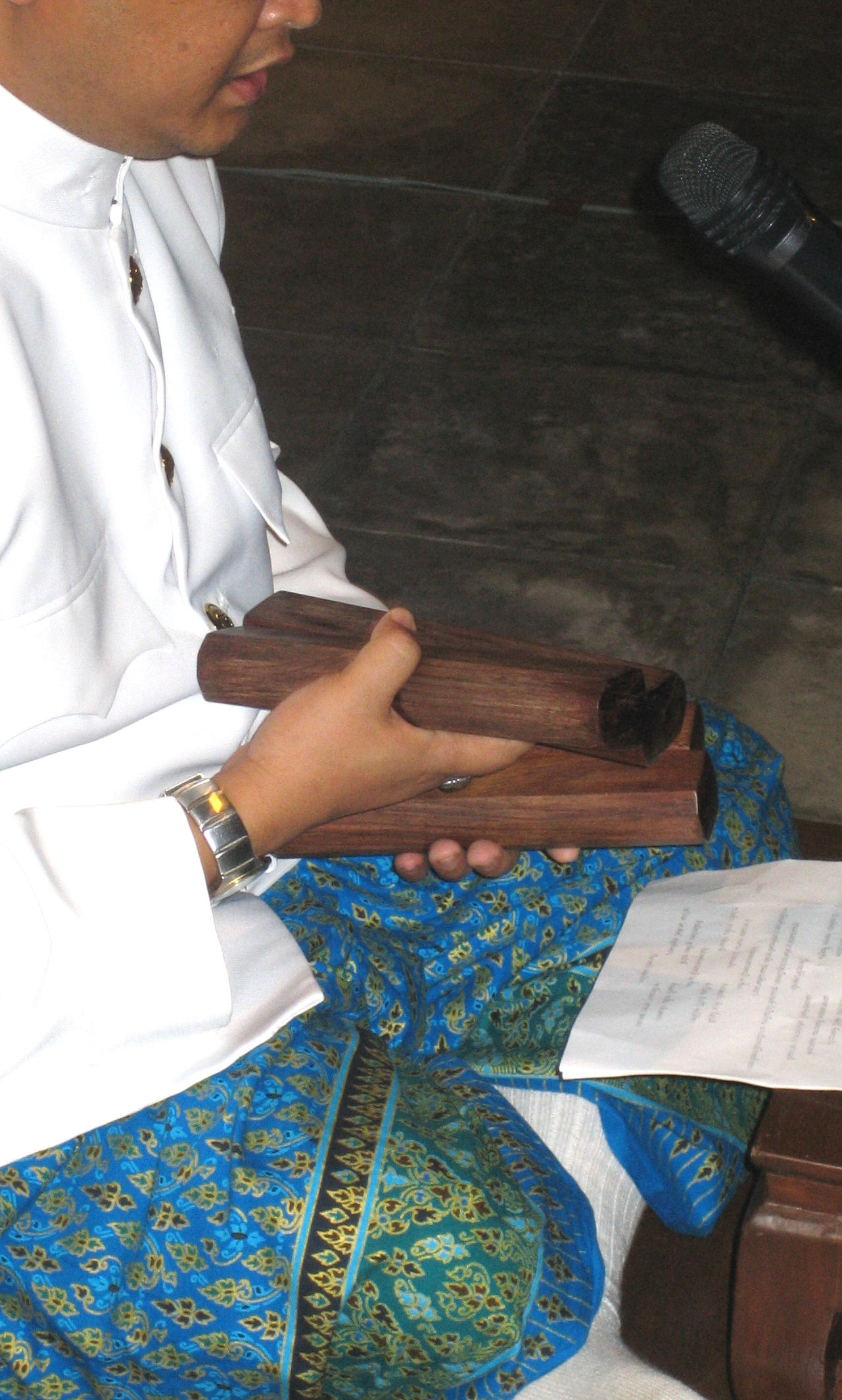
Sepha performance, showing krap.

The krap (Thai: กรับ, pronounced [kràp] Khmer: ក្រាប់) is a Southeast Asian musical percussion instrument (clapper) used in Cambodia and Thailand for percussion. The krap, made of bamboo, wood and metal, are used for dance rhythms and for song.

== Thailand ==
The Thai version of the instrument comes in three varieties.

The krap koo or krap khu (กรับคู่) is made from two pieces of split bamboo, approximately 40 cm in length, cut to make 2 pieces 20 cm each. The two cut sides are clapped together

The krap phuang (กรับพวง) is made from thin wood or brass, often consisting of a number of pieces tied with string. Layers are sandwiched—wood or ivory with thin brass sheets between heavier wood pieces. The sandwich is threaded at the bottom, going through the entire stack. They are played by holding the stack at the threaded end and slapping it against an open palm. It is used in royal ceremonies.

The krap saepa or krap sēphā (กรับเสภา) are rectangular concussion sticks made from wood and used in pairs. It has a length of about 20 cm and a thickness of about 3 to four cm. They are used in along with a sēphā chant in Thailand. A variation of the krap saepa is the kringkrap, made of lengths of bamboo (two pieces held in each palm), struck together within the palms. This latter is found in northeast Thailand.

== Cambodia ==
The Cambodians have at least five versions of the instrument, based on the kind of music it supports and the materials used to make the instruments.

The Krap Chayam is constructed of blocks of bamboo and is used in chayam music, being clapped together in the player's hands. The Krap nyee (ក្រាបញី krap female) was originally made from seashells, but is now also of bamboo, still shaped like shells. It is used in dance music, clicked together dancing women, like castanets. The Krap chmol (ក្រាបឈ្មោល krap male) is made from bamboo of different lengths, one length held still while hitting it with the other, striking a rhythm. It has coins attached that jingle. The krap kour is a length of bamboo with metal balls attached, and is played by tapping it in the palm of the other hand. Finally there is the krap arak, used in arak music by the Cham, consisting of one-meter lengths of bamboo, stamped on the ground to the beat, like a stamping drum.

Another Cambodian version is the krap fuong, listed in 1964 as being made of 2 pieces of hardwood, cut in different sized rectangles.

== See also ==
- Traditional Thai musical instruments
- Traditional Cambodian musical instruments
