= Kuman thong =

Thai household divinity

Kuman thong กุมารทอง
- Luck-bringing deity
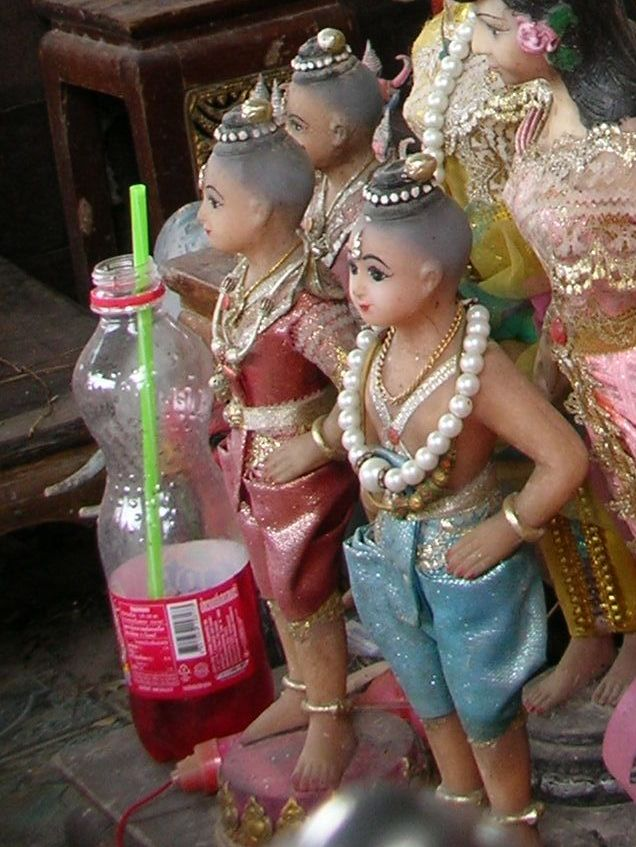
- Kuman thong figures at a shrine in Ratchaburi Province
- Venerated in: Thai folklore
- Associated deities: Hong phrai Koan kroach

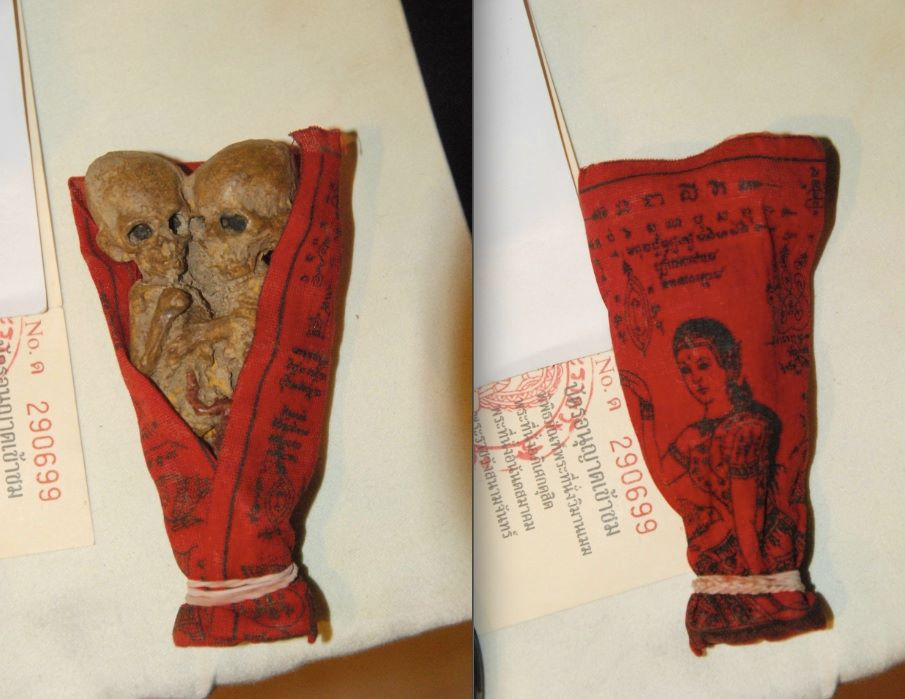
A reproduction kuman thong sold as a souvenir at a Buddhist temple in Ayutthaya wrapped in a cloth featuring Nang Kwak.

A kuman thong (Thai: กุมารทอง) is a household deity of Thai folk religion. It is believed to bring luck, fortune and wealth to the owner if properly revered. Kuman, or kumara (Pali) means 'young boy' (female kumari); thong means 'golden'.

These beings are often worshipped to obey their worshippers for personal gains, protection, wealth and harm in some cases. It is believed to have consequences to each request.

== Description ==
The veneration of kuman thong is not part of mainstream Buddhist practices, but it is popular in Thailand. Mainstream Buddhism does not recognize such practice. However, due to the widespread belief in animism in Thailand, kuman thong adopted Buddhist beliefs and mixed the two together.

=== Origins ===
The authentic kuman thong originated in a practice of necromancy. They were obtained from the desiccated fetuses of children who had died whilst still in their mothers' womb. The witch doctors were said to have the power to invoke these stillborn babies, adopt them as their children, and use them to help them in their endeavours.

According to ancient Thai manuscripts used by practitioners of black magic (Thai: ไสยศาสตร์ Saiyasat), first the unborn fetus was surgically removed from the womb of its mother. Then the body of the child would be taken to a cemetery for the conduction of the proper ceremonial ritual to invoke a kuman thong. The body was roasted until dry whilst the witch doctor chanted incantations of magical script. Once the rite was completed, the dry-roasted Kuman was painted with Ya Lak (a kind of lacquer used to cover amulets and Takrut with gold leaf). Thus this effigy received the name of “kuman thong”, meaning “Golden Little Boy”.

Some Kuman effigies were soaked in Nam Man Prai, a kind of oil extracted by burning a candle close to the chin of a dead child or a person who died in violent circumstances or an unnatural death. This is much less common now, because this practice is now illegal if using fat from human babies for the consecrating oil. Occasionally there are still some amulets obtained through the authentic methods appearing in the market. Some years ago a famous monk was expelled from the Buddhist Sangha for roasting a baby. He was convicted, but later continued to make magic as a layperson after his release.

=== Kuman Nee ===
In the case of a female spirit child, the effigy is not called kuman thong, but Kuman Nee.

=== In literature ===
The kuman thong is mentioned in the Thai legend of Khun Chang Khun Phaen, where the character Khun Phaen made one by removing the still-living fetus from the body of his wife Bua Klee, whom he had killed. Khun Phaen takes the fetus to a temple, where he ritually dries it over a fire. The kuman thong spirit then takes the form of a young boy (known in translation as "Goldchild") who accompanies Khun Phaen, protects him and gives him advice.

== Cultural references ==
A Filipino full-length horror film, Kuman Thong, was released in 2024, directed by Xian Lim and starring Cindy Miranda as Clara, with Thai actors Max Nattapol Diloknawarit as Sai Chon and Jariya Therakaosal as Namfon, and child star Althea Ruedas as Katie. Filmed in Thailand, it is inspired by Thai mythology.

Khemjira, a 2025 Thai romantic supernatural drama television series, featured Thong (Udon Chayanon Akaradumrongdej) and Ek (Ryuji Nachawakorn Sirirak) as twin boy Kuman thong.

In the 2026 Thai supernatural drama television series Khom Khlang, Thanaphat Imkiat plays Thong, a kuman thong under a sacred master's care.

== Recent events ==
On May 18 2012, a 28-year-old British citizen of Hong Kong origin, Chow Hok Kuen, was arrested in a Bangkok hotel room with six male fetuses that had been roasted and covered in gold. Police reported that Kuen intended to sell the fetuses in Taiwan for about 6,300 USD each.

In 2011, a case was reported in Laos of a man murdering his pregnant wife, so as to use the fetus as a "Louk Lord" under village shaman direction.

Hyper-realistic dolls of children (but not made out of real children), "Luk Thep" or "Look Thep" ("child angel"), have recently (2015) become popular in Thailand. Some people believe the dolls can be injected with the spirit of a child after being blessed by a Buddhist monk. Their owners provide such care as food, water and clothes "in the hope of receiving good fortune in return", and some companies offer owners of the dolls the option to reserve them their own seats and services.

On 27 February 2021, a Vietnamese YouTuber, Thơ Nguyễn posted a video on asking for intelligence from a kuman thong. This video was posted on TikTok. After being posted, Thơ Nguyễn's video immediately encountered a wave of strong protests from parents. She was summoned by the Internal Political Security Department under the Ministry of Public Security, citing anti-superstition laws. On 16 March, she was fined VND 7.5 million for providing and sharing information that promotes superstition.

== See also ==
- Tai folk religion
- Spirit house
- Shancai Tongzi
- Mizuko kuyō
- Sak Yant
- Koan kroach
- Domovoy
