= Sujit Wongthes =

Thai journalist, historian, and author

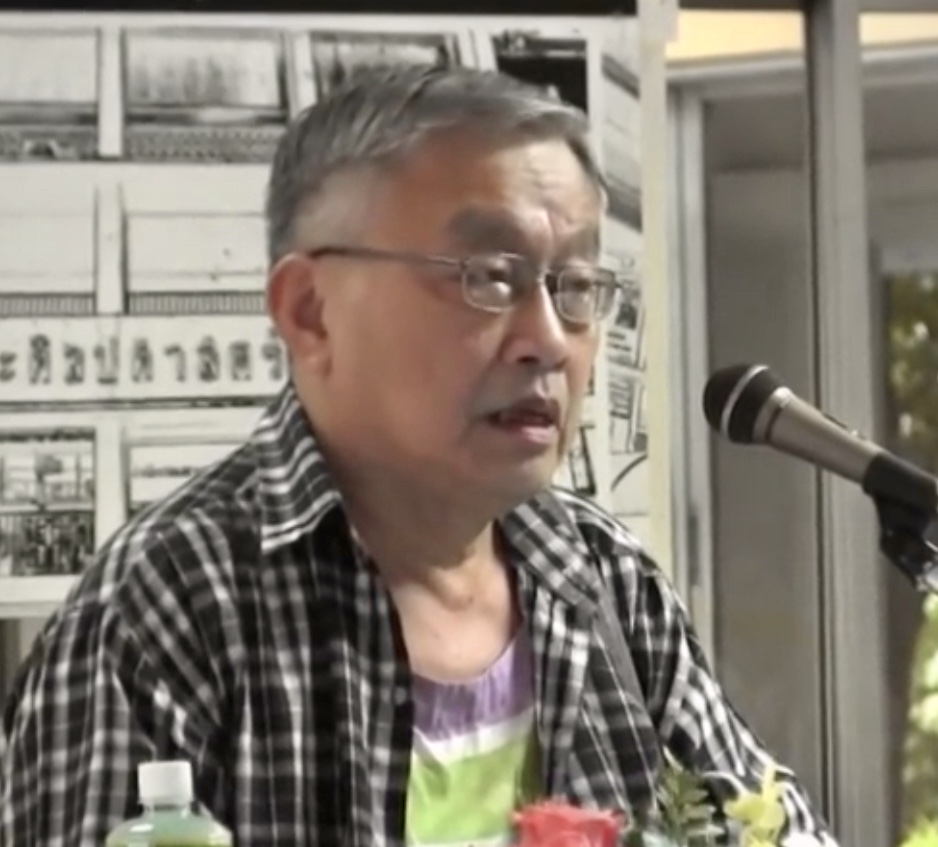
Wongthes in 2012

Sujit Wongthes (Thai: สุจิตต์ วงษ์เทศ, RTGS: Suchit Wongthet; born April 20 1945) is a Thai journalist and author.

== Biography ==
He was born in Prachinburi province to a father of Phuan descent and a mother of Teochew Chinese descent. Wongthes attended Silpakorn University, graduating from the archaeology program there. During his time at university, he wrote for the student journal, Sangkhomsat Paritht (Social Science Review), in which he criticized excessive materialism and the Americanization of Thai culture; he wrote contemporaneously with Sulak Sivaraksa, who was the journal's editor at the time. He later wrote for Prachachat, a newspaper associated with progressive elements of Thai society. After the military coup that toppled the Seni Pramoj administration, Prachachat was shut down. Three years later, Wongthes founded Sinlapa Watthanatham, an arts and culture magazine, and served as the magazine's editor.

One of Wongthes' best-known works is titled Jek Phon Lao, meaning 'Chinese mixed with Lao'. In this work, he advanced the position that modern Thais are a mixture of native Lao people and Chinese migrants to Siam, as well as other groups. This contradicted Thai nationalist historiography, which is based on the idea that Thais had been driven out of southern China and which pitted Thai identity against Chinese identity. He followed this work with Khon Thai Mai Dai Ma Chak Nai ('The Thai Did Not Come From Somewhere Else'), which further attacked nationalist ideas by showing Tai people still living happily in China.

== Awards and recognitions ==
Wongthes was recognized with a Sriburapha Award in 1993, and further awarded the title of National Artist in 2002.
