= Takrut =

Thai amulet

Takrut (Thai: ตะกรุด) is a type of tubular amulet that originated from Thailand. It is also known as "Tangkai" in other cultures. The takrut is similar to a talisman (Arabic: طلسم / transliterated: tilasim). The word Takrut is used for both Singular and Plural, although many people do add an 's' (Takruts). However, the proper way to refer to takrut, when in plural, is 'Takrut'.

They are worn by Thai people as a protective amulet and have existed for centuries. They are the most commonly mentioned form of amulet in the Khun Chang Khun Phaen, a Thai epic. They have an elongated scroll-like shape, and are usually made of metal or palm leaf and tied to the body with a cord.

Yant (ยันต์, yantra) are incantations and sacred geometric designs with Pali gatha and Buddhist prayers (invocations and empowerment spells), usually, but not always inscribed using the ancient Khom Pali script (a variant of Khmer script used in Thailand). In Northern Thailand, they use Lan Na Tai Tham script. The takrut is used for all purposes from Maha Sanaeh (attraction), Metta Mahaniyom (business success and popularity), Mercy Charm, Maha Pokasap/Lap (riches attraction), and Kong Grapan (invincibility).

Potential takeouts include gems, especially engraved gems, statues, coins, drawings, pendants, rings, plants and animals; even words in the form of a magical spell, incantation, to repel evil or bad luck.

Takrut has been part of Thai culture even before buddhism arrived in Thailand. After Thai Buddhism take roots, the takrut become the earlier form of buddhism amulets made by monk in 1200-1300A.D.

In ancient Thailand, takrut was very popular as there are constant warfare and poor security conditions. Takruts are mainly blessed for safe keeping (invulnerable) purpose, to bless end user for safety their daily work or business trips or going to war.

== Variations of traditional takrut ==
Takrut are usually put inside a special type of case and worn with a chain around the neck at chest level. They are also worn about the waist but can also be worn as most pieces of jewelry. They are worn about the body to protect specific parts of the body or to grant power to those body parts. But whether it is worn at the chest or the waist, its purpose is still the same: to give protection to its wearer. Some smaller takrut can be kept between the teeth to allow the carrier to be a more powerful speaker. This power is called sariga, a golden tongued celestial magpie, featured in Vedic and Thai Buddhist Legends.

== See also ==
- Cetiya
- Jinapañjara
- Luang pho phet
- Kuman thong
- Paritta
- Sacca-kiriya
- Somdej Toh
- Yantra tattooing
