= Sansoen Phra Barami =

Royal anthem of Thailand

English: 'Praise the King'
- สรรเสริญพระบารมี
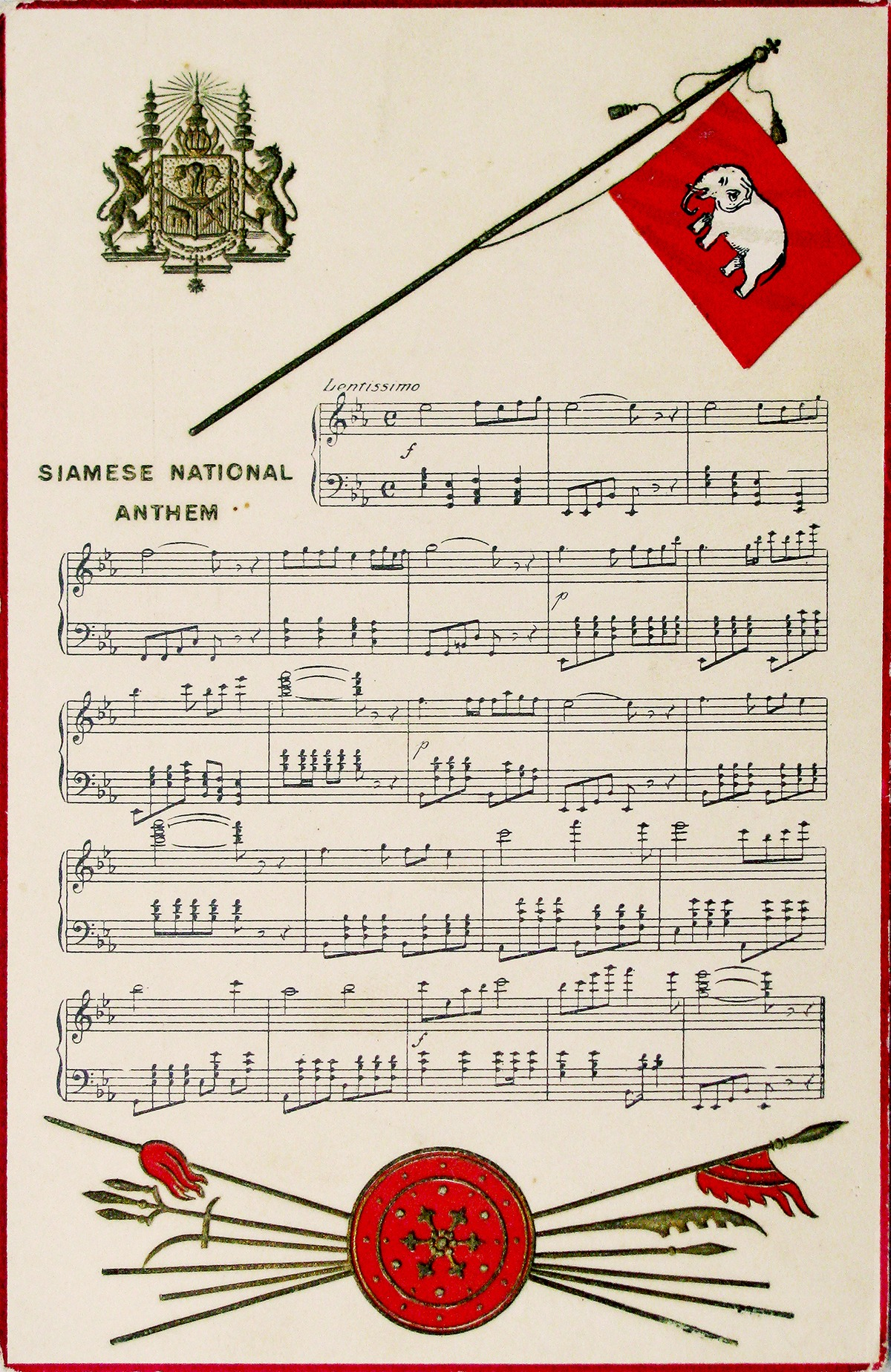
- Sheet music of "Phleng Sansoen Phra Barami" in postcard, early 20th century
- Former national anthem of Siam; Royal anthem of Thailand
- Also known as: เพลงสรรเสริญพระบารมี (English: 'Song of the Praise to the King')
- Lyrics: Vajiravudh and Narisara Nuwattiwong, 1914
- Music: Pyotr Shchurovsky, 1888
- Adopted: 1888 (unofficial lyrics); 1914 (official lyrics)
- Relinquished: 1932 (as national anthem)
- Preceded by: "Bulan Loi Luean"
- Succeeded by: "Phleng Chat Siam" (as national anthem)

Audio sample
- U.S. Navy Band instrumental rendition in E-flat major: file; help

"Sansoen Phra Barami" (Thai: สรรเสริญพระบารมี; pronounced [sǎn.sɤ̌ːn pʰráʔ bāː.rā.mīː]; transl. "Praise the King") is the current royal anthem of Thailand. It was a de facto national anthem of Siam before 1932.

== History ==
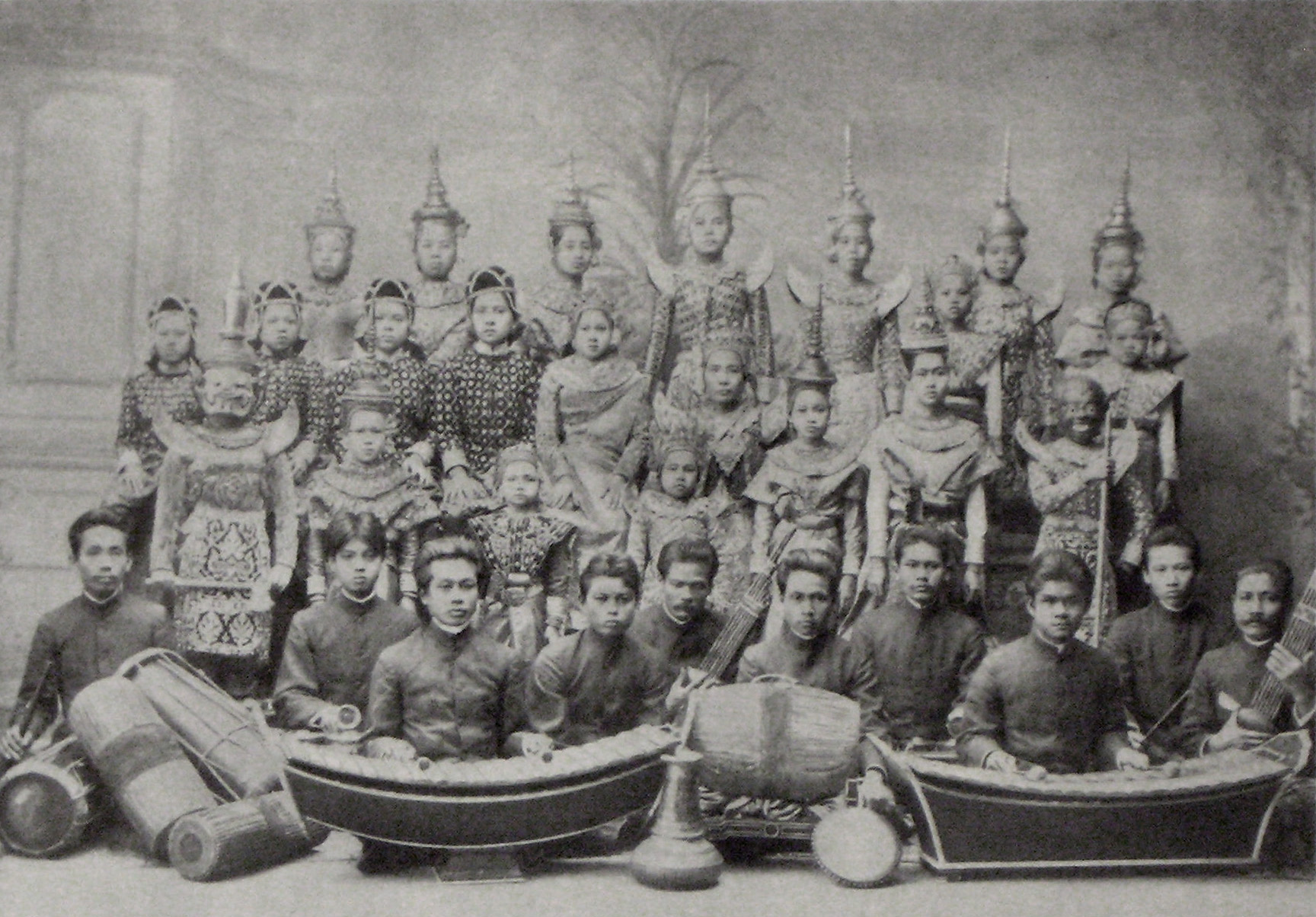
Boosra Mahin Theater Group, a Siamese theater group that performed and recorded the royal anthem in Berlin, c. 1900

1900 instrumental version
First sound recordings of "Sansoen Phra Barami" in phonograph cylinder, performed by the Boosra Mahin theater group, who visited Berlin, Germany, in 1900

The first song to be used as royal anthem and de facto national anthem of Thailand appeared in the reign of King Mongkut of Rattanakosin Kingdom. In 1851, two former British military officers named Captain Impey and Lieutenant Thomas George Knox served with the Siamese Army. They trained the troops of King Mongkut and the Second King Pinklao with British military tradition. So, they adopted the anthem "God Save the King" as honor music for the king of Siam. Phraya Srisunthonwohan (Noi Āchāryānkura) wrote Thai lyrics for this anthem later and named it as "Chom Rat Chong Charoen", which means "long live the great king".

In 1871, King Chulalongkorn visited Singapore and Batavia (now Jakarta) in the Dutch East Indies; it appeared that Siam used the same anthem with Great Britain, who ruled over Singapore at that time. It was necessary that Siam must have a new unique tune for using as the royal anthem and de facto national anthem. A group of Siamese traditional musicians had selected a Thai song named "Bulan Loi Luean" which was the royal composition of King Rama II for use as the new anthem. King Chulalongkorn later ordered Christopher Hewetson, a Dutch bandmaster who served in the Royal Siamese Army, to arrange the song in western style for performing by the military band. According to a research of Sugree Charoensuk, an associate professor from Mahidol University, the melody of this anthem may be the same tune with another anthem named "Sansoen Sua Pa" which had been used as the anthem of the Wild Tiger Corps since 1911.

History about the royal anthem of Siam after 1871 are ambiguous, and evidence is rare to find. An evidence of music composition of the royal anthem of Siam appeared again in 1888 when a sheet music of the Siamese national anthem, arranged by the Russian composer Pyotr Schurovsky, was printed in Russia. The main melody of the song in that sheet music is the same tune of "Sansoen Phra Barami" in present time. According to a research of Sugree Charoensook, Shchurovsky composed the music of "Sansoen Phra Barami" to serve as Siam's national anthem. Prince Narisara Nuvadtivong later composed various lyrics of "Sansoen Phra Barami" for using in the Royal Siamese Army, in all Siamese schools and in Siamese traditional music bands. Prince Abhakara Kiartivongse also composed a version of lyrics for used in the Royal Siamese Navy. In 1914, King Vajiravudh decided to relinquish all lyrics of "Sansoen Phra Barami" that mentioned before and revised it to current version only.

"Sansoen Phra Barami" was the de facto national anthem of Siam from 1888 until 1932, when it was replaced by "Phleng Chat Siam". It is still used as the royal anthem of Thailand today.

The sound recording of "Sansoen Phra Barami" was recorded for the first time ever on the Edison wax cylinder by Carl Stumpf, an ethnomusicologist from the University of Berlin. In that recording, the anthem was performed by Boosra Mahin Theater Group, a Siamese theater group visiting Berlin in 1900.

=== Short versions ===
Sansoen Phra Barami (1935 full instrumental version)
Performed by the Royal Siamese Navy Orchestra.

Sansoen Phra Barami (1935 abridged instrumental version)
Performed by the Royal Siamese Navy Orchestra.

The current melody of Sansoen Phra Barami was originally used in two ways: a full version played to honor His Majesty the King, and a half version played to honor the Prince of the Front Palace (Krom Phra Ratchawang Bowon Sathan Mongkhon). This tradition ceased after the death of Prince Wichaichan, the last Prince of the Front Palace, in 1885. This is documented in a letter from His Royal Highness Prince Narisara Nuwattiwong, dated May 6, 1935, to Luang Wichitwathakan, the Director-General of the Fine Arts Department at the time, in response to a consultation regarding the abbreviation of the Royal Anthem.

"Furthermore, I should inform you of the past history. Previously, the Royal Anthem "Sansoen Phra Barami" was divided into half and full versions. The half version, from the beginning down to "Yen Sira Phro Phra Boriban," was played to welcome Krom Phra Ratchawang Bowon Sathan Mongkhon, while the full version was played to welcome His Majesty the King. After [the last] Krom Phra Ratchawang Bowon Sathan Mongkhon passed away, the half-version of the Royal Anthem was no longer used and simply disappeared."

Following the Siamese Revolution of 1932, a new Siamese National Anthem was composed (now the Thai National Anthem), so "Sansoen Phra Barami" was no longer used as the national anthem but continued to be used as an honorific song for the King. The melodies of the Royal Anthem and the Siamese national anthem were shortened in 1935 for use in ceremonial honors in the style of Western countries. The occasions for using the elaborate version of the Royal Anthem (full version) and the abridged version were also specified according to the regulations for performing the Royal Anthem and national anthem dated February 4, 1935. The Fine Arts Department later issued a further clarification stating that when singing the Royal Anthem, it should be sung using only the lyrics of the elaborate version of the Royal Anthem and not the abridged version.

In 1940, the Thai government under the administration of Prime Minister Plaek Phibunsongkhram issued the 8th Thai cultural mandate, concerning the lyrics of "Sansoen Phra Barami", which were shortened and the word "Siam" replaced with "Thai" (see below). The shorten lyrics version is used as the full version of the royal anthem, while the 1935 abridged instrumental version was still remain the same. After the end of World War II, these short versions were quietly abandoned due its unpopularity, and reverted to the version that revised by King Vajiravudh in 1914.

== Usage of the anthem ==
A Piphat Band from Fine Arts Department play the Thai Royal Anthem after ending of Khon performance in royal cremation ceremony of Princess Bejaratana Rajasuda in 2012.

The royal anthem is performed during state occasions, as well as when a high-ranking member of the royal family is present for a function. In addition, the royal anthem is still played before the beginning of each film in movie theatres, as well as before the commencement of the first act in plays, musicals, concerts, and most other live performances of music or theatre in Thailand. The anthem is also played at the sign-on and closedown of television and radio programming; for example, in 2008, 7HD aired a video with pictures of King Bhumibol Adulyadej from his birth to his 80th birthday in 2007. Radio Thailand (or NBT) also broadcast the sign-off with the anthem at 24:00 every night.

Thai people stand for the royal anthem of Thailand at the 2009 Red Cross Fair, Royal Plaza (Bangkok).

In 2019, the Royal Thai Government Gazette has published the Royal Office Regulation on Performing Honors Music of B.E. 2562. This regulation is detailed about using the royal anthem and other honors music for the king and members of the Thai royal family in several occasions. According to this regulation, The royal anthem "Sansoen Phra Barami" should be performed for the following:

- The King of Thailand
- The Queen of Thailand
- Princess Maha Chakri Sirindhorn, the Princess Royal
- Heirs-apparent to the throne
- Royal remains
- Some Thai Royal Standards when hoisted or shown:
  - Royal Standard of Thailand
  - Standard of the Queen of Thailand
  - Standard for Senior members of the Royal Family (Standard of the Princess Mother)
  - Standard of Princess Maha Chakri Sirindhorn, the Princess Royal
  - Standard of the Crown Prince of Thailand

== Lyrics ==
1958 band and vocal version
Performed by the Orchestra of the Fine Arts Department of Thailand

=== Official lyrics ===
The following are the current lyrics of "Sansoen Phra Barami", which was written by Prince Narisara Nuwattiwong in 1886 and revised by King Vajiravudh in 1914. Used for the first time by the Wild Tiger Corps and Siamese scouts in 1914, January 22, at Ban Bo Suphan (in Song Phi Nong district, Suphan Buri Province) during a long journey from Nakhon Pathom Province to the ancient pagoda at Don Chedi in Suphan Buri Province, for paying homage to the pagoda which is believed to have been built as a memorial to the elephant duel of King Naresuan the Great. Officially adopted in school nationwide by the Ministry of Education in March 1 of the same year.

Thai original

ข้าวรพุทธเจ้า
เอามโนและศิระกราน
นบพระภูมิบาล บุญดิเรก
เอกบรมจักริน
พระสยามินทร์
พระยศยิ่งยง
เย็นศิระเพราะพระบริบาล
ผลพระคุณ ธ รักษา
ปวงประชาเป็นสุขศานต์
ขอบันดาล
ธ ประสงค์ใด จงสฤษดิ์ดัง
หวังวรหฤทัย
ดุจถวายชัย ชโย

Transliteration (RTGS)

Kha woraphutthachao
Ao mano lae sira kran
Nop phra phumiban bunyadirek
Ek borommachakkrin
Phra sayamin
Pra yotsa ying yong
Yen sira phro phra boriban
Phon phra khun tha raksa
Puang pracha pen suk san
Kho bandan
Tha prasong dai chong sarit dang
Wang woraharuethai
Dutcha thawai chai chayo

IPA transcription (Note: See Help:IPA/Thai and Thai language § Phonology.)

/kʰâː wɔ̄ː.ráʔ.pʰút.tʰáʔ.tɕâːw/
/ʔāw máʔ.nōː lɛ́ʔ sìʔ.ráʔ krāːn/
/nóp pʰráʔ pʰūː.míʔ.bāːn būn.jáʔ.dìʔ.rèːk/
/ʔèːk bɔ̄ː.rōm.máʔ.tɕàk.krīn/
/pʰráʔ sàʔ.jǎː.mīn/
/pʰráʔ jót.sàʔ jîŋ jōŋ/
/jēn sìʔ.ráʔ pʰrɔ́ʔ pʰráʔ bɔ̄ː.ríʔ.bāːn/
/pʰǒn pʰráʔ kʰūn tʰáʔ rák.sǎː/
/pūaŋ pràʔ.tɕʰāː pēn sùk sǎːn/
/kʰɔ̌ː bān.dāːn/
/tʰáʔ pràʔ.sǒŋ dāj tɕōŋ sàʔ.rìt dāŋ/
/wǎŋ wɔ̄ː.ráʔ.hàʔ.rɯ́ʔ.tʰāj/
/dùt.tɕàʔ tʰàʔ.wǎːj tɕʰāj tɕʰáʔ.jōː/

English translation

We, servants of His great Majesty,
prostrate our heart and heads,
to pay respect to the ruler, whose merits are boundless,
our glorious sovereign,
the greatest of Siam,
with great and lasting honor.
Secure and peaceful we are because of thy royal rule.
The result of royal protection
are people in happiness and peace.
May it be that
whatever you will, be done
according to the hopes of thy great heart.
Victory to thee, hurrah!

=== Abridged lyrics during World War II ===
Instrumental version for abridged lyrics during World War II
Performed by Rabbit Gramophone Record

Revised from 1914 official lyrics by the Thai Fine Arts Department, with the shortened lyrics and replacement of the word "Siam" with the word "Thai". Adopted by the 8th Thai cultural mandate, issued 26 April 1940.

Thai original

ข้าวรพุทธเจ้า
เอามโนและศิระกราน
นบพระภูมิบาล
บรมกษัตริย์ไทย
ขอบันดาล
ธ ประสงค์ใด จงสฤษดิ์ดัง
หวังวรหฤทัย
ดุจถวายชัย ชโย

Thai romanization (RTGS)

Kha woraphutthachao
Ao mano lae sira kran
Nop phra phumiban
Boromkasat thai
Kho bandan
Tha prasong dai chong sarit dang
Wang waraharuethai
Dutcha thawai chai chayo

IPA transcription

[kʰâː wɔː.ráʔ pʰút.tʰáʔ t͡ɕâːw]
[ʔaw má.noː lɛ́ʔ sì.ráʔ kraːn]
[nóp pʰráʔ pʰuː.míʔ baːn]
[bɔrom káʔ.sat tʰaj]
[kʰɔ̌ː ban.daːn]
[tʰáʔ prà.sǒŋ daj t͡ɕoŋ sà.rìt daŋ]
[wǎŋ wá.ráʔ hà.rɯ́.tʰaj]
[dùt.t͡ɕàʔ tʰà.wǎːj t͡ɕʰaj t͡ɕʰá.joː]

English translation

We, servants of His great Majesty,
prostrate our heart and heads,
to pay respect to the ruler,
the great King of Thailand.
May it be that
whatever you will, be done
according to the hopes of thy great heart.
Victory to thee, hurrah!

=== Ancient drama lyrics ===
Written by Prince Narisara Nuwattiwong, the lyrics appear in the play Sang Thong based on the titular classical Thai folktale and literary masterpiece about a prince born from a golden conch shell.

Thai

อ้าพระนฤปจง
ทรงสิริวัฑฒนา
จงพระพุทธศา-สนฐีติยง
ราชรัฐจงจีรัง
ทั้งบรมวงศ์ ฑีรฆดำรง
ทรงกรุณาประชาบาล
ราชธรรม ธ รักษา
เป็นหิตานุหิตสาร
ขอบันดาล
ธ ประสงค์ใด จงสิทธิ์ดัง
หวังวรหฤทัย
ดุจถวายไชย ฉนี้

English translation

Ah! May our King
be blessed with glory and prosperity.
May Buddhism remain steadfast forever.
Long live the Kingdom (of Siam)
and long live the Royal Dynasty.
(May the King) be merciful to protect all people,
uphold the royal dharma
and make benefits (to the country), whether big or small.
May it be that
whatever you will, be done
according to the hopes of thy great heart.
Victory to thee, as we said.

=== School lyrics ===
Vocal version (with 1902 lyrics for co-ed school)
From His Master's Voice gramophone, registered number G.C.7-12282

These three lyrics of "Sansoen Phra Barami" was written by Prince Narisara Nuwattiwong and officially adopted in school nationwide by the Ministry of Education of Siam in 1902.

==== Co-ed school ====
Thai

ข้าวรพุทธเจ้า
เหล่ายุพยุพดี
ยอกรชุลี วรบทบงสุ์
ซร้องศัพทถวายชัย ในนฤปทรง
พระยศยิ่งยง
เย็นศิระเพราะพระบริบาล
ผลพระคุณะรักษา
ชนนิกายะศุขสานต์
ขอบันดาล
ธ ประสงค์ใด จงสิทธิ์ดัง
หวังวรหฤทัย
ดุจถวายชัย ฉะนี้

English translation

We, servants of His great Majesty,
all boys and girls,
prostrate our hand to pay respect to the ruler,
wish for prosperity to our sovereign
with great and lasting honor.
Secure and peaceful we are because of thy royal rule.
The result of royal protection
are people in happiness and peace.
May it be that
whatever you will, be done
according to the hopes of thy great heart.
Victory to thee, as we said.

==== Boys' school ====
Thai

ข้าวรพุทธเจ้า
เหล่าดรุณกุมารา
โอนศิรวันทา วรบทบงสุ์
ซร้องศัพทถวายชัย ในนฤปทรง
พระยศยิ่งยง
เย็นศิระเพราะพระบริบาล
ผลพระคุณะรักษา
ชนนิกายะศุขสานต์
ขอบันดาล
ธ ประสงค์ใด จงสิทธิ์ดัง
หวังวรหฤทัย
ดุจถวายชัย ฉะนี้

English translation

We, servants of His great Majesty,
all young male students,
prostrate our head to pay respect to the ruler,
wish for prosperity to our sovereign
with great and lasting honor.
Secure and peaceful we are because of thy royal rule.
The result of royal protection
are people in happiness and peace.
May it be that
whatever you will, be done
according to the hopes of thy great heart.
Victory to thee, as we said.

==== Girls' school ====
Thai

ข้าวรพุทธเจ้า
เหล่าดรุณกุมารี
โอนศิรชุลี วรบทบงสุ์
ซร้องศัพทถวายชัย ในนฤปทรง
พระยศยิ่งยง
เย็นศิระเพราะพระบริบาล
ผลพระคุณะรักษา
ชนนิกายะศุขสานต์
ขอบันดาล
ธ ประสงค์ใด จงสิทธิ์ดัง
หวังวรหฤทัย
ดุจถวายชัย ฉะนี้

English translation

We, servants of His great Majesty,
all young female students,
prostrate our head to pay respect to the ruler,
wish for prosperity to our sovereign
with great and lasting honor.
Secure and peaceful we are because of thy royal rule.
The result of royal protection
are people in happiness and peace.
May it be that
whatever you will, be done
according to the hopes of thy great heart.
Victory to thee, as we said.

=== Military lyrics ===
==== Royal Thai Army version ====
This lyrics was written by Prince Narisara Nuwattiwong in 1888.

Thai

ข้าวรพุทธเจ้า
เหล่าพิริย์พลพลา
สมสมัยกา- ละปิติกมล
รวมนรจำเรียงพรรค์
สรรพ์ดุริยพล สฤษดิมลฑล
ทำสดุดีแด่นฤบาล
ผลพระคุณรักษา
พลนิกายะสุขศานต์
ขอบันดาล
ธ ประสงค์ใด จงสิทธิ์ดัง
หวังวรหฤทัย
ดุจถวายชัย ฉะนี้

English translation

We, servants of His great Majesty,
all men of the Royal Army.
In this occasion of happiness
We have assembled
A group of soldier musicians here
to pay respecting for our sovereign.
The result of royal protection
are the happiness and peace for all army men.
May it be that
whatever you will, be done
according to the hopes of thy great heart.
Victory to thee, as we said.

==== Royal Thai Navy version ====
This lyrics was written by Prince Abhakara Kiartivongse.

Thai

ข้าวรพุทธเจ้า
เหล่ายุทธพลนาวา
ขอถวายวันทา วรบทบงสุ์
ยกพลถวายชัย
ให้สยามจง อิสระยิ่งยง
เย็นศิระเพราะพระบริบาล
ใจทหารทั้งบ่าวนาย
ยอมขอตายถวายท่าน
ขอบันดาล
ธ ประสงค์ใด จงสฤษดิ์ดัง
หวังวรหฤทัย
ดุจถวายชัย ฉะนี้

English translation

We, servants of His great Majesty,
all naval officer and seamen,
pay respect to our ruler,
and wish for prosperity,
to the everlasting independence of Siam,
Secure and peaceful we are because of thy royal rule.
All naval soldiers are willing
to give their lives for thee.
May it be that
whatever you will, be done
according to the hopes of thy great heart.
Victory to thee, as we said.

== Periodization ==
Chronology of Thai royal anthems
Name	Date	Notes
Sansoen Phra Narai; (Thai: สรรเสริญพระนารายณ์); ('Glorify the King Narai')	1687–1688	A piece of music from Ayutthaya Kingdom period that may have been used in honor of the King of Ayutthaya named "Say Samon", recorded in a sheet music by Simon de la Loubère. Captain Michael Fusco arranged this piece of music for military bands in the 1890s, named "Pra Narai" in homage to king Narai of the Ayutthaya Kingdom. The Royal Thai Army Band rearranged this song in marching style for usage in the royal procession and used this arrangement for first time in the royal cremation ceremony of King Bhumibol Adulyadej in 2017.
Chom Rat Chong Charoen; (Thai: จอมราชจงเจริญ); ('Long Live the Great King')	1852–1871	First official documented royal anthem of Siam in Rattanakosin period, may be considered as the first de facto national anthem, introduced by King Mongkut (used the melody of God Save the King)
Bulan Loi Luean; (Thai: บุหลันลอยเลื่อน); ('The Floating Moon on the Sky')	1871–1888	Royal composition of King Phutthaloetla Naphalai (Rama II) and also his favorite song, used as the new Rattanakosin royal and de facto national anthem. King Chulalongkorn later ordered Christopher Hewetson, a English bandmaster who served in the Royal Siamese Army, to arrange the song in western style for performing by the military band. According to a research of Sugree Charoensuk, an associate professor from Mahidol University, the melody of this anthem may be the same tune with another anthem named Sansoen Suea Pa (Thai: เพลงสรรเสริญเสือป่า; 'Hymn of the Wild Tiger Corps') which was used as the anthem of the Wild Tiger Corps since 1911.
Sansoen Phra Barami; (Thai: สรรเสริญพระบารมี); ('Glorify His Prestige')	1888–1932 (national anthem); royal anthem since 1932	Rattanakosin (Siam) de facto national anthem. Used as the royal anthem of Siam (later Thailand) only since 1932. An abridged instrumental version was made in 1935. A version with shortened lyrics was adopted by the 8th Thai cultural mandate, issued 26 April 1940. The two latter versions were later abandoned due its unpopularity.
Sansoen Suea Pa; (Thai: สรรเสริญเสือป่า); ('Glory to the Wild Tigers')	1911–1925	A western arrangement of the song "Bulan Loi Luean" made by Prince Paribatra Sukhumbandhu. Its lyrics was composed by Prince Narisara Nuwattiwong. Used as a flag anthem of the Wild Tiger Corps during 1911-1925. The Vajiravudh College used this song as a special royal anthem for the late king Vajiravudh since 1951. Royal Thai Army Band rearranged this song in marching style for using in the royal procession and used this arrangement for first time in the royal cremation ceremony of King Bhumibol Adulyadej in 2017.
