= Coup of 1912 =

Coup of 1912 may refer to:

- Palace Revolt of 1912 in then-Siam
- 1912 Ottoman coup d'état
