= Sansoen Phra Narai =

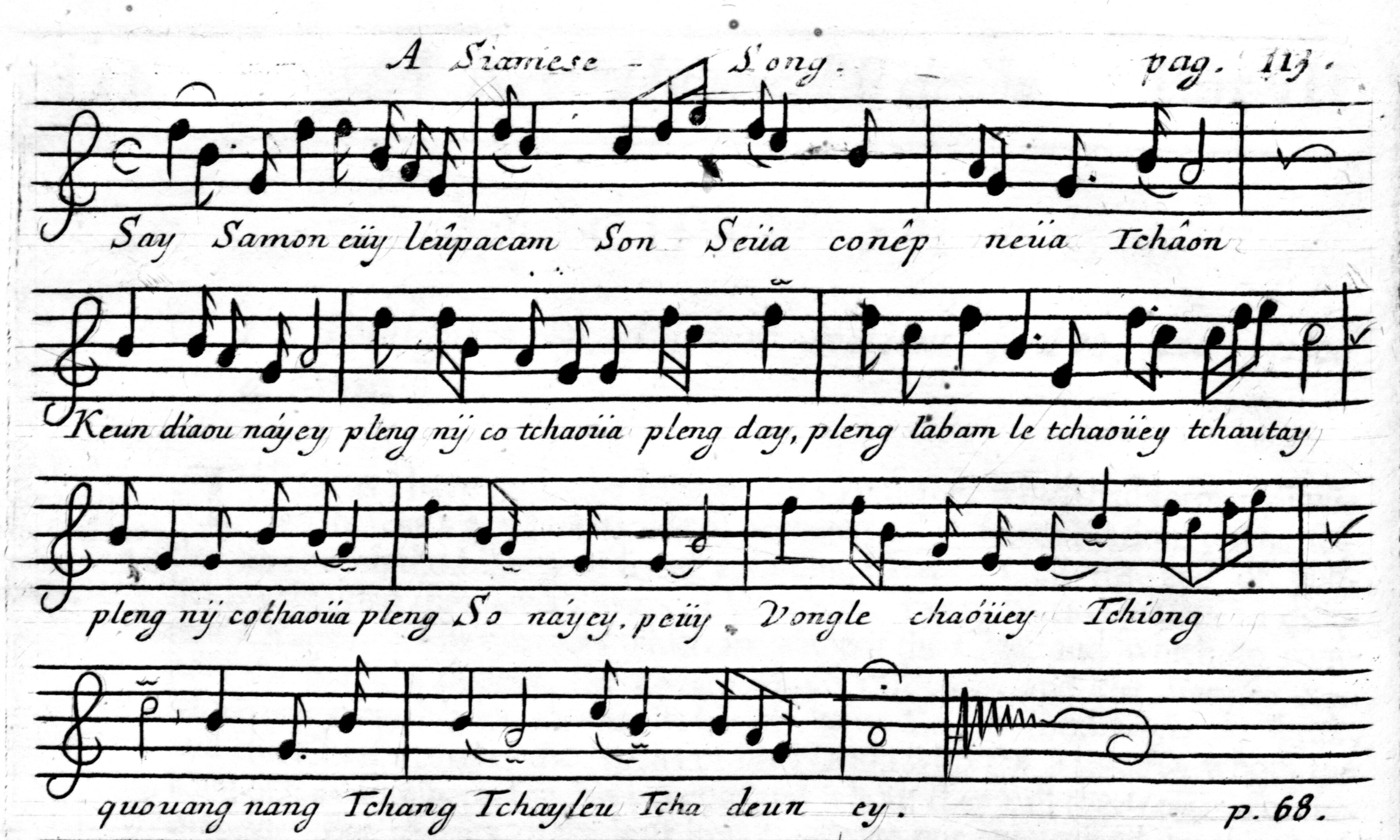
- Sheet music for "A Siamese Song", from la Loubère's 1693 book
- English: Glorify to King Narai
- Native name: สรรเสริญพระนารายณ์
- Year: 1899
- Melody: Sheet music for A Siamese Song from Simon de la Loubère

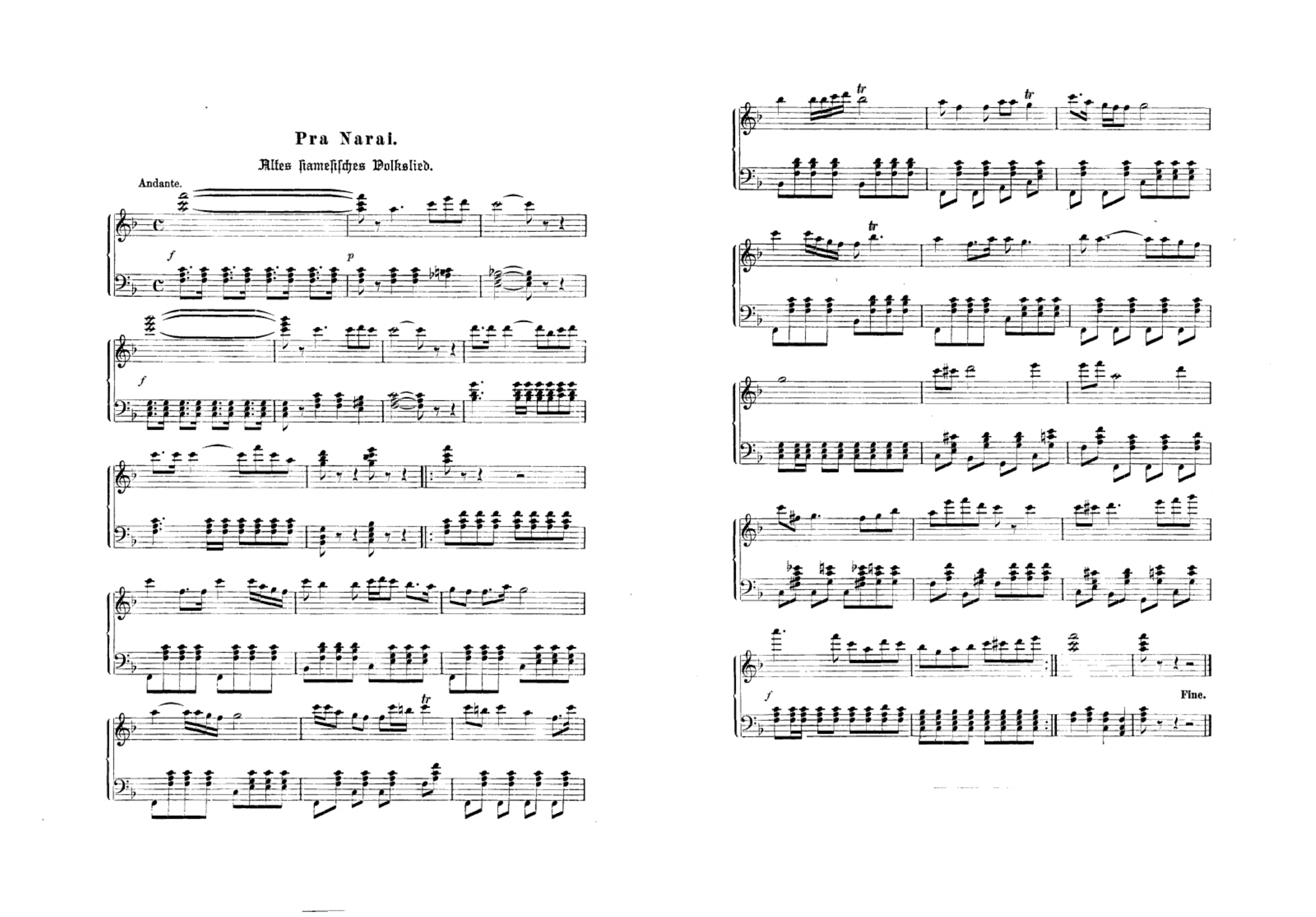
Sheet music of the song "Pra Narai", arranged by Captian Michael Fusco, an Italian-American band master for the Royal Siamese Marine band in 1890s based on "A Siamese Song" from la Loubère's 1693 book.

A musical band of Thai royal guard perform the song "March Sansoen Phra Narai" ("the March in praise of King Narai) which is based on la Loubère's "A Siamese Song" during a rehearsal of King Vajiralongkorn's royal land procession in 2020, December 7.

"Sansoen Phra Narai" (Thai: สรรเสริญพระนารายณ์) is a music composition based on a notated piece found in Simon de la Loubère's records of the French embassy to the Kingdom of Ayutthaya in 1687, originally titled in the English version as "A Siamese Song". King Chulalongkorn (Rama V) had a modern arrangement made by Michel Fusco in 1897, and used it as a royal anthem. The piece was arranged as the title song for the 1941 film King of the White Elephant, under the name "Si Ayutthaya". This arrangement was also used in the 2017 TV series Sri Ayodhaya, and the march composition was used in the royal funeral of King Bhumibol Adulyadej (Rama IX) the same year. and the Coronation of Vajiralongkorn in 2019.

== Lyrics ==
The lyrics may have not been exactly accurate as it was written in an older Thai transcription, which in return, makes it hard to transcribe the lyrics into Thai.

สายสมรเอย	ลูกประคำซ้อนเสื้อ
ขอแนบเนื้อฉะอ้อน	เคียงที่นอนในเอย
เพลงนี้ก็เจ้าเอยเพลงใด	เพลงระบำหรือเจ้าเอยเจ้าใต้
เพลงนี้ก็เท่าเอย	เพลงซอนะเอย พี่เอย
หวังละจะเชยจะเยื้องก้าวย่าง	นางช่างจะเลี้ยว จะเดินเอย

=== Prince Narathip Praphanphong's transcription to Thai ===
สายสมรเอย	เลี้ยวประคองสรเสื้อ
ขอแนบเนื้อฉอ้อน	ข่วนเดี๋ยวเหนื่อย
เพลงนี้ขอเจ้า	เพลงระบำหรือไฉนเจ้าไถ่
เพลงนี้ขอเจ้า	เพลงสาวน้อย
เผยหวังแลเชยข้องของ	นางช่างเฉลียวระเดิรเอย

== See also ==
- Sansoen Phra Barami, the present royal anthem of Thailand

Other former Thai royal anthems

- Chom Rat Chong Charoen
- Bulan Loi Luean
