= List of SEA Games mascots =

The SEA Games mascots are fictional characters, usually an animal native to the area or human figures, who represent the cultural heritage of the place where the SEA Games are taking place. The mascots are often used to help market the SEA Games to a younger audience.

| Edition | Host | Mascot(s) | Description |
|---|---|---|---|
| 1985 | (Thailand) Bangkok | Wichien-maat | A Siamese cat. |
| 1987 | (Indonesia) Jakarta | None | It was a deliberate choice by the organizers to forgo a mascot for those Games, distinguishing them from earlier editions like 1985 (Wichien-maat) and later ones like 1989 (Johan). |
| 1989 | (Malaysia) Kuala Lumpur | Johan | A yellow turtle. |
| 1991 | (Philippines) Manila | Kiko Labuyo | A colourful fighting cock. |
| 1993 | Singapore | Singa | A lion. |
| 1995 | (Thailand) Chiang Mai | Sawasdee | A Siamese cat with a Bo Sang umbrella. |
| 1997 | (Indonesia) Jakarta | Hanuman | The monkey character of the Ramayana epic. |
| 1999 | (Brunei) Bandar Seri Begawan | Awang Budiman | A Bruneian boy. |
| 2001 | (Malaysia) Kuala Lumpur | Si Tumas | A squirrel. |
| 2003 | (Vietnam) Hanoi and Ho Chi Minh City | Trâu Vàng | A golden water buffalo. |
| 2005 | (Philippines) Manila | Gilas | A Philippine eagle. |
| 2007 | (Thailand) Nakhon Ratchasima | Can | A Korat cat with khene. |
| 2009 | (Laos) Vientiane | Champa and Champi | Two elephants dressed in traditional Lao attire. |
| 2011 | (Indonesia) Jakarta and Palembang | Modo and Modi | A pair of Komodo dragons. Also used in the 2011 ASEAN Para Games. |
| 2013 | (Myanmar) Naypyidaw | Shwe Yoe and Ma Moe | A couple of owls. |
| 2015 | Singapore | Nila | A lion with red mane and heart-shaped face. Also used in the 2015 ASEAN Para Games. |
| 2017 | (Malaysia) Kuala Lumpur | Rimau | A Malayan tiger. Also used in the 2017 ASEAN Para Games. |
| 2019 | (Philippines) Clark | Pami | A sponge ball figure. |
| 2021 | (Vietnam) Hanoi | Sao La | a saola. |
| 2023 | (Cambodia) Phnom Penh | Borey and Rumduol | Two rabbits wearing traditional Khmer attire. Also used in the 2023 ASEAN Para Games. |
| 2025 | (Thailand) Bangkok–Chonburi | The Sans | Five characters, green, blue, red, yellow and pink, based on Thai motifs. Also used in the 2025 ASEAN Para Games. |
| 2027 | (Malaysia) Kuala Lumpur–Sarawak–Penang and Johor | Tuah | A futuristic and robotic-looking modern character. Also used in the 2027 ASEAN Para Games. |

== See also ==
- List of Olympic mascots
- List of Asian Games mascots
- List of Commonwealth Games mascots
