= Chaiyo (disambiguation) =

Chaiyo is a Thai exclamation, equivalent to 'hurrah' in English.

Chaiyo may also refer to:

- Chaiyo district, a district (amphoe) in Ang Thong province, Thailand
  - Wat Chaiyo, common name of Wat Chaiyo Worawihan, a Buddhist temple in Chaiyo
- Chaiyo, the mascot of the 1998 Asian Games
- Chaiyo Productions, a Thai film production company headed by Sompote Sands
