= Palace Revolt of 1912 =

Failed uprising in Siam

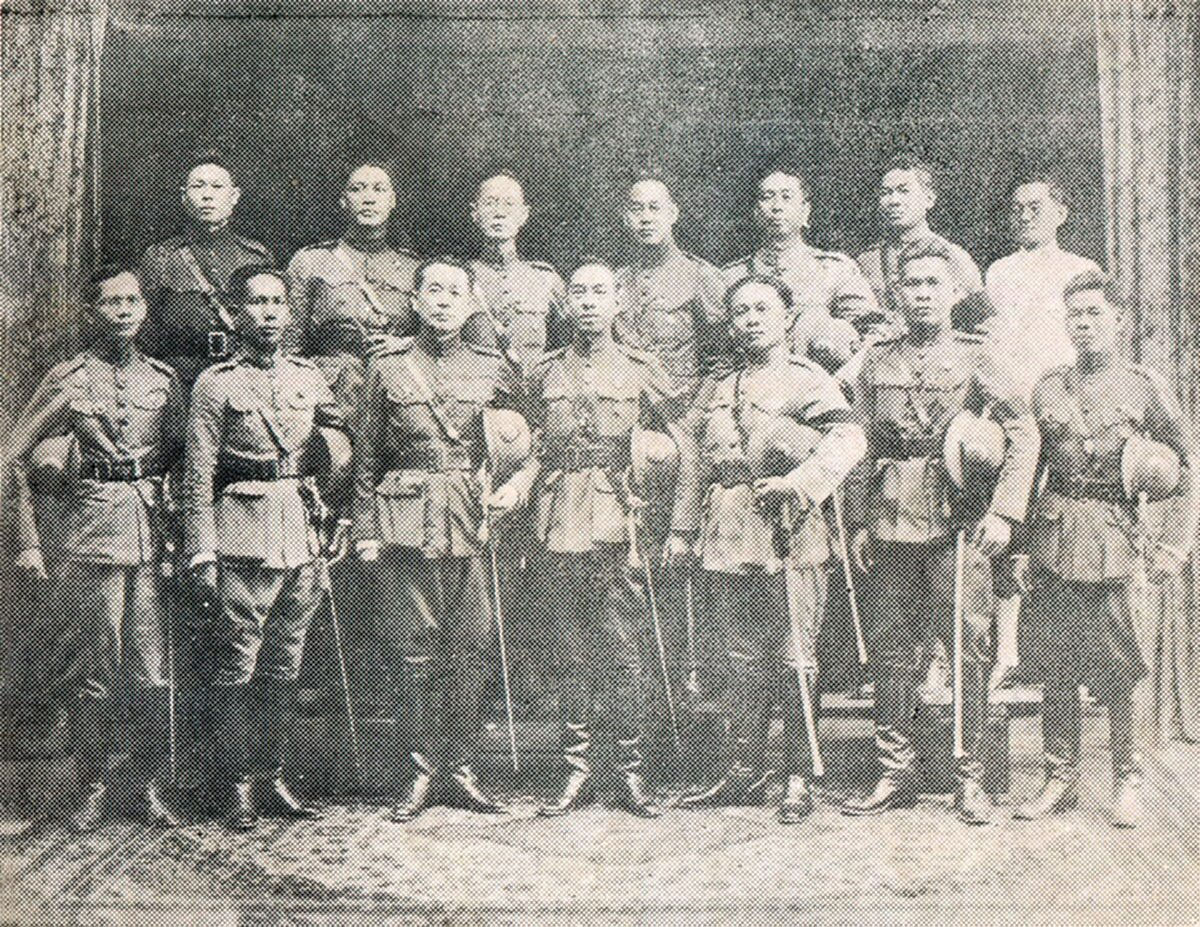
- Photograph of key plotters
Date	1 April 1912
Location	Pranakorn, Siam
Result	Captain Yut Khongyu confessed all the rebels' plans and names before a revolt.; 3 plotters were sentenced to death, 20 received life imprisonment, 32 received 20 years, 6 received 15 years and 30 received 12 years imprisonment.; Most of the plotters were pardoned or had their sentences lessened by the king.

Belligerents
The Rebels of 1912	Monarchy of Siam

Commanders and leaders
Khun Thuayhanpitak	King Vajiravudh

The Palace Revolt of 1912 (Thai: กบฏ ร.ศ. 130) was a failed uprising against the absolute monarchy of Siam. Discontent in the army during the reign of King Vajiravudh (Rama VI) led to the unsuccessful coup.

== Background ==
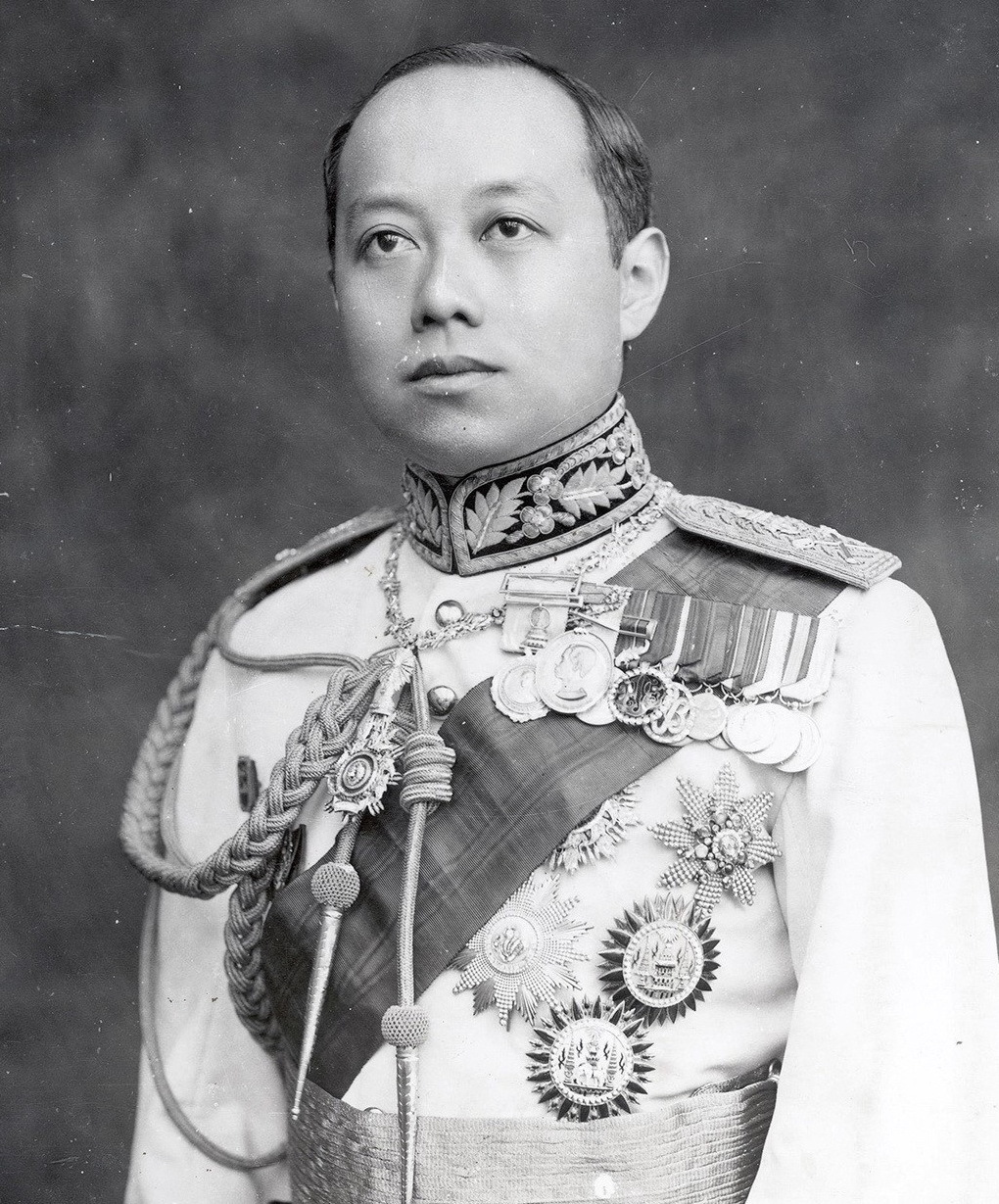
Vajiravudh, King of Siam

In 1909, a group of soldiers got into an argument over a woman with a group of Vajiravudh's pages near the entrance to his palace. At the time, Vajiravudh was the crown prince and designated successor to King Chulalongkorn (Rama V). Six soldiers were arrested, and Vajiravudh petitioned Chulalongkorn to cane the soldiers. The practice of caning had recently been banned, and Chulalongkorn refused the petition. However, Vajiravudh threatened to resign as successor and Chulalongkorn eventually consented to the caning. The incident caused much dissatisfaction within the army.

Vajiravudh succeeded his father as King of Siam on 23 October 1910. He set out in his coronation speech to modernize and Westernize Siam in his role as its absolute monarch. However, the new king spent lavishly on several palaces and lived a life of excess in a period when most of the kingdom's populace were rural farmers and serfs. Infatuated with Western culture and the ideals of an Edwardian English gentleman, he spent his time translating Shakespeare's works into Thai, staging dramatic productions, hunting, and overseeing his Wild Tiger Corps.

== Wild Tiger Corps ==
On 1 May 1911, Vajiravudh established the Wild Tiger Corps (Thai: กองเสือป่า, RTGS: Kong Suea Pa). The corps was meant to be a nationwide paramilitary corps completely devoid of regular military influence and answerable only to the king himself. At first a ceremonial guard, it became a military force of 4,000 within its first year. The king would often socialize with them openly. The Wild Tigers, whose membership mostly consisted of commoners, eventually rivaled the army in strength and the civil service in influence. Vajiravudh even went so far as appointing some to high ranks in the army and nobility.

While the king socialized with members of the corps, the army and aristocrats were deeply dissatisfied. They saw these new appointments as a threat to their hold on power while also regarding the fact that Siam was in danger of financial collapse.

== The revolt ==
On 13 January 1912, dissatisfied with his absolutist reign, especially his favourism towards the Wild Tigers, a group of seven army officers decided to overthrow King Vajiravudh. The group's membership eventually reached 91 officers. The group were led by Captain Khun Thuayhanpitak (Thai: ร.อ.ขุนทวยหาญพิทักษ์) and included some of the king's own guards. Perhaps inspired by the successful overthrow of the Qing dynasty in China that same year, they decided to move forward. Their plans were unclear and their goals contradictory. Some wanted to replace Vajiravudh with one of his many brothers, others wanted a constitutional monarchy or even a republic.

On 1 April 1912, coinciding with Thai New Year, Vajiravudh was to preside over a merit-making ceremony in public. Captain Yut Khongyu (Thai: ร.อ.ยุทธ คงอยู่) was selected by the plotters to assassinate the monarch on that day. Filled with guilt, Yut instead confessed all the plans and names of the conspirators to the commander of the king's guard on 27 February, who, in turn, told Vajiravudh's brother, Prince Chakrabongse Bhuvanath of Phitsanulok. The plotters were quickly arrested and imprisoned. At a military tribunal, three were sentenced to death, 20 received life imprisonment, 32 received 20 years, 6 received 15 years and a further 30 received 12 years imprisonment. They were tried for attempted regicide, treason, and attempted overthrow of the government.

The failed uprising was the first revolt against the House of Chakri from the outside the nobility. Despite their actions, most of the plotters were pardoned or had their sentences lessened by Vajiravudh in 1924, including those sentenced to death as the king felt that no one had been hurt. However, the lesson was not lost on Vajiravudh, who quickly stepped up vigilance against any such threats in the future.

== Aftermath and legacy ==
The Wild Tiger Corps was disbanded soon after the revolt. In 1914, Vajiravudh determined that the act providing for invoking martial law, first promulgated by his father in 1907, was not consistent with modern laws of war or convenient for the preservation of the external or internal security of the state, so he changed it to the modern form that, with minor amendments, continues to be in force. Vajiravudh reigned until 1925, initiating many reforms with mixed success. He died of natural causes and was succeeded by his brother Prajadhipok (Rama VII). Siam's absolute monarchy was eventually overthrown by the Revolution of 1932, the leaders of which openly confessed their inspiration to be the actions of the 1912 plotters.

== See also ==
- Vajiravudh
- Prajadhipok
- Chakri Dynasty
- Siamese Revolution of 1932
- History of Thailand (1768–1932)
