= Pyotr Shchurovsky =

Russian composer and musician

- Пётр Щуровский
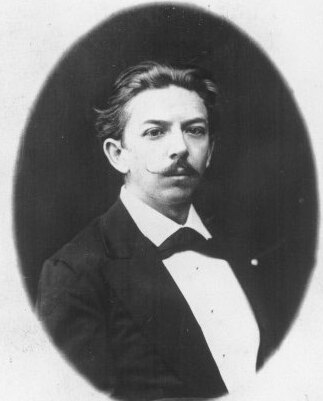
- Born: 12 February [O.S. 24 February] 1850; Zolotonoshsky Uyezd, Poltava Governorate, Russian Empire
- Died: 14 September [O.S. 27 September] 1908 (aged 58); Kursky Uyezd, Kursk Governorate, Russian Empire
- Burial place: Vsehsvyatskoe Cemetery, Tula, Russia.
- Education: Moscow Conservatory
- Occupations: Writer, composer, musician
- Known for: Composing the music for Sansoen Phra Barami
- Spouse: Vera Ivanovna Shchurovskaya

Pyotr Andreyevich Shchurovsky (Note: Sometimes romanized as Petro or Pyotr Andreevich Schurovsky) (Russian: Пётр Андреевич Щуровский; 12/24 February 1850 – 14/27 September 1908) was a Russian conductor and composer known for composing the music of Sansoen Phra Barami.

== Life ==
Shchurovsky was born on 12 February 1850, in Zolotonoshsky Uyezd, Poltava Governorate into a noble family. He spent his early life in Moscow and was interested in instruments and music when he was young. He studied piano and music theory at the Moscow Conservatory, whose director at the time was Nikolai Rubinstein. During that time he also befriended Pyotr Ilyich Tchaikovsky, his teacher. After finishing, he began conducting at the Imperial Theatres in Moscow and organised concerts and musical lectures. He was the organizer of musical education in Poltava, where he also tutored Ukrainian composer Gordiy Pavlovich Gladky.

In 1870, he became an opera band leader in Kharkiv. Later, he became the head of the Bolshoi Theatre, one of the most famous music theatres in Russia but then resigned to continue giving lectures on music. He dedicated his romance "To You, My Friend" to his long-time friend, Pavel Akinfievich Khokhlov, a famous Bolshoi Theatre soloist and baritone in Russia. Shchurovsky, Khokhlov, and Tchaikovsky were, according to his wife's memoirs, reportedly great friends, who even had shared nicknames for each other, being "Pe‑Cha", "Pe‑Kha", and "Pe‑Shcha".

In 1888, Shchurovsky took part in a contest organized by King Rama V to create a new anthem for Siam. He sent a score to the Siamese ambassador in Paris who then sent the score to Siam, where the King selected his composition as the winning entry, rewarding him with a commemorative gift. This would later be the music to Sansoen Phra Barami which would later become the de facto national anthem of Siam until 1932, where it is now used as the current royal anthem of Thailand.

In 1889, he moved to a farmstead in Shchigrovsky Uyezd, Kursk Governorate where his wife Vera Ivanovna Shchurovskaya (née Ofrosimova), a singer, owned an estate.

Shchurovsky sometimes translates works about music. He wrote the opera Bohdan Khmelnytsky (premiered 1883) about Ruthenian military commander Bohdan Khmelnytsky, and began an opera titled Kuznets Vakula ("Blacksmith Vakula"), which remains unfinished. He composed around thirty vocal romances and various piano pieces (many setting Russian and European poems). Shchurovsky wrote a book about musical instructions and in 1890, he gathered 85 different national anthems and published them as a book, titled "Сборник национальных гимнов всех государств света" (Collection of national anthems of all countries of the world)

Shchurovsky died on 14 September [O.S. 27 September] 1908 in Kursk. He is buried in the Vsehsvyatskoe Cemetery, Tula.

== Works ==
Shchurovsky's works are mostly full of romances and music to poems:

- Моя баловница
- Богдан Хмельницкий
- Ночная дума
- Песнь Гассана
- Тебе мой друг
- Sansoen Phra Barami
- Ангел смерти
- Где твоё личико смуглое
- И моя звёздочка
- Когда печаль слезой невольной
- Летняя песня
- Mädchen mit dem roten Mündchen
- Мать в сердцах меня журила
- Моя баловница
- Не долго длились наши встречи
- Не ошиблася ты
- О, пойми, что любовь обладает
- Острою секирой
- Первая любовь
- Помнишь ли, милый
- Речная Лилея
- Романс Нины
- Saphire sind die Augen dein
- Сирота
- Совет девушке
- Только до слуха коснётся
- Убаюкай, родная, больную меня
- Вверху одна горит звезда
- Желания
- Желание
- Желанья
- Зимний вечер
- Звезда, не обмани
