= List of Asian Games mascots =

The Asian Games mascots are fictional characters, usually an animal native to the area or human figures, who represent the cultural heritage of the place where the Asian Games are taking place. The mascots are often used to help market the Asian Games to a younger audience. Every Asian Games since 1982 has its own mascot. Appu, the mascot for the 1982 Asian Games, was the first mascot.

== Asian Games mascots ==
Games	City	Name	Description	Significance	Refs.
1982 Asian Games	New Delhi	Appu	Indian elephant	Represents fidelity, wisdom and strength.	
1986 Asian Games	Seoul	Hodori and Gomdoori	Siberian tiger and two Asian black bears	Common in Korean legends. Also used in the 1988 Summer Olympics and 1988 Summer Paralympics, respectively.	
1986 Asian Winter Games	Sapporo	Unnamed mascot	Squirrel		
1990 Asian Games	Beijing	Pan Pan	Panda		
1990 Asian Winter Games	Sapporo	Unnamed mascot	Squirrel	The same mascot as the one from 1986.	
1994 Asian Games	Hiroshima	Poppo and Cuccu	Two white doves created by Susumu Matsushita.	They represent peace and harmony.	
1996 Asian Winter Games	Harbin	Dou Dou	Character inspired by the pea plant		
1998 Asian Games	Bangkok	Chai-yo	Thai elephant	Elephants are admired in Thailand for their big stature, fortitude and strength. The mascot's name "Chai-yo", means "hurrah" in Thai and represents unity and solidarity.	
1999 Asian Winter Games	Kangwon	Gomdori	Half-moon black bear cub	A symbolic animal of the Kangwon Province.	
2002 Asian Games	Busan	Duria	Seagull	Seagulls are sometimes called the city bird of Busan. The mascot's name, "Duria", is a combination of the two words 'Durative' and 'Asia'. It can also mean "You and Me Together" in the Korean language and expresses the ideal of the Games: to promote unity and partnership among Asian countries.	
2003 Asian Winter Games	Aomori	Winta	Black woodpecker	Symbolizes the nature of the Aomori Prefecture.	
2006 Asian Games	Doha	Orry	Qatari oryx	The oryx is a native antelope of the Middle East and the national animal of Qatar. Orry was chosen by the games' Organising Committee to represent energy, determination, sportsmanship spirit, commitment, enthusiasm, participation, respect, peace and fun.	
2007 Asian Winter Games	Changchun	Lulu	Sika deer	The sika deer is a native deer of East Asia. In Chinese culture, this deer is considered to be a symbol of good luck and fortune.	
2010 Asian Games	Guangzhou	A Xiang, A He, A Ru, A Yi and Le Yangyang	Five goat rams	The Chinese character "yang," or "goat," is an auspicious symbol because, when read together, the Chinese names of the five rams are a message of blessing, literally meaning "harmony, blessings, success and happiness" (祥和如意樂洋洋). Guangzhou is also called "the Goat City" (羊城) or "Five Goats City" (五羊城).	
2011 Asian Winter Games	Astana and Almaty	Irby	Snow leopard		
2014 Asian Games	Incheon	Barame, Chumuro, and Vichuon	Three spotted seals	The mascots' name means wind, dance and light in Korean. According to the organizers, the mascots were chosen as symbolic to the future peace between South Korea and North Korea.	
2017 Asian Winter Games	Sapporo	Ezomon	Flying squirrel	The mascot is modeled after a type of flying squirrel only found in the Hokkaido region of Japan.	
2018 Asian Games	Jakarta and Palembang	Bhin Bhin	Bird-of-paradise	The mascots reflect Indonesia's diversity with three animals, each from different regions in Indonesia. Bhin Bhin wear a vest with Asmat traditional motifs from the Papua, Eastern Indonesia Region, which symbolize strategy. Atung wear a batik tumpal sarong from Central Indonesian Region, which symbolizes speed and a "Never give up fighting" spirit. Kaka (originally named Ika) wear a flower motif from Palembang's Songket scraf that represents Western Indonesia Region, which symbolize power.	
2018 Asian Games	Jakarta and Palembang	Atung	Bawean deer	The mascots reflect Indonesia's diversity with three animals, each from different regions in Indonesia. Bhin Bhin wear a vest with Asmat traditional motifs from the Papua, Eastern Indonesia Region, which symbolize strategy. Atung wear a batik tumpal sarong from Central Indonesian Region, which symbolizes speed and a "Never give up fighting" spirit. Kaka (originally named Ika) wear a flower motif from Palembang's Songket scraf that represents Western Indonesia Region, which symbolize power.	
2018 Asian Games	Jakarta and Palembang	Kaka	Javan rhinoceros	The mascots reflect Indonesia's diversity with three animals, each from different regions in Indonesia. Bhin Bhin wear a vest with Asmat traditional motifs from the Papua, Eastern Indonesia Region, which symbolize strategy. Atung wear a batik tumpal sarong from Central Indonesian Region, which symbolizes speed and a "Never give up fighting" spirit. Kaka (originally named Ika) wear a flower motif from Palembang's Songket scraf that represents Western Indonesia Region, which symbolize power.	
2022 Asian Games	Hangzhou	Congcong, Lianlian, and Chenchen	Three futuristic robot characters	Each mascot reflects a World Heritage of Hangzhou. Congcong reflects jade cong from the Archaeological Ruins of Liangzhu City. Chenchen reflects Gongchen Bridge on the Grand Canal. Lianlian reflects lotus from the West Lake. The whole group is named as 'Jiangnanyi', meaning 'Remembering Jiangnan', originated from the title of a famous ci poem in praise of the landscape of the city, written by Bai Juyi, then prefect of Hangzhou.	
2025 Asian Winter Games	Harbin	Binbin and Nini	A pair of Siberian tigers.	In traditional Chinese culture, the tiger, as a symbol of auspiciousness, is endowed with lots of positive qualities, among which integrity, strength, and courage are highly compatible with the spirit of the Olympic Games.	
2026 Asian Games	Nagoya	ホノホン(Honohon)	Shachihoko	The name "Honohon" comes from “Honoho”, which is said to be the origin of the word “flame”. This name comes from the fact that the fire stands tall and shines brightly, resembling an ear of rice. The mascot is based on the Shachihoko, which is a symbol of Aichi-Nagoya. The mascot was born from the passion and flame in the hearts of the athletes who will gather in Aichi-Nagoya from all over Asia. It loves sports, and its mission is to wildly appeal the Asian Games and to bring people together beyond race and culture through sports and a wish for peace.	

== Asian Beach Games mascots ==
Games	City	Name	Description	Significance	Refs.
2008 Asian Beach Games	Bali Province	Jalak bali	Bali myna	This is a bird species endemic to the island of Bali.	
2010 Asian Beach Games	Muscat	Al Jebel	Tahr		
2010 Asian Beach Games	Muscat	Al Reeh	Houbara bustard		
2010 Asian Beach Games	Muscat	Al Med	Green turtle		
2012 Asian Beach Games	Haiyang	Sha Sha, Yang Yang, and Hai Hai	Characters inspired by dragons and phoenixes.		
2014 Asian Beach Games	Phuket	Sintu, Sakorn, and Samut	Three green sea turtles	In Thai, "Sintu", "Sakorn", and "Samut" all mean water. The sea turtle is a symbol of endurance, development, sustainability and growth.	
2016 Asian Beach Games	Da Nang	Chim Yen	Swiftlet	Special characteristic of the southern central coastal region of Vietnam is famous for its bird nests - a product of high economic value in general and a specialty of Da Nang in particular.	
2026 Asian Beach Games	Sanya	Yaya	Eld's deer	The eld's deer is the indigenous animal reputed as the "Elf of Hainan Island" and a Class I Key Protected Species in China. The first "ya" of the mascot's name comes from "Sanya", and the second one comes from Asia, whose Chinese name is "Yazhou".	

== Asian Indoor and Martial Arts Games mascots ==
Games	City	Name	Description	Significance	Refs.
2005 Asian Indoor Games	Bangkok	Hey and Há	Couple of elephants	The blue and athletic elephant was named Hey and the yellow and plump one was Há. They were to convey the meaning of amusement, merriment and relaxation, thus in a way reflecting the natures of the Asian Indoor Games a great deal.	
2007 Asian Indoor Games	Macau	Mei Mei	Black-faced spoonbill		
2009 Asian Indoor Games	Hanoi	Gà Hồ	Hồ chicken	The Hồ chicken is a distinctly Vietnamese rare breed of chicken, familiar as a symbol in Vietnam. According to folklore, the chicken have the five qualities of a man of honour: literacy, martial arts, physical strength, humanity and loyalty.	
2009 Asian Martial Arts Games	Bangkok	Hanuman Yindee	Monkey	"Hanuman" is a white – creamy super monkey from Ramakien and considers it as the God of the ape which has every kind of fighting skill with strong determination of great success.	
2013 Asian Indoor and Martial Arts Games	Incheon	Barame, Chumuro, and Vichuan	Three spotted seal		
2017 Asian Indoor and Martial Arts Games	Ashgabat	Wepaly	Central Asian Shepherd Dog	The mascot's name means loyal friend in Turkmen. The Central Asian Shepherd Dog, locally known as Alabai is renowned as a courageous animal for many centuries has helped Turkmen shepherds to safeguard flocks of cattle in heavy conditions.	

== Asian Youth Games mascots ==
Games	City	Name	Description	Significance	Refs.
2009 Asian Youth Games	Singapore	Frasia	Lion	The mascot's name, "Frasia", is a portmanteau of the words "Friends of Asia". The mascot represents friendship, respect and excellence.	
2013 Asian Youth Games	Nanjing	Yuan Yuan	Eosimias sinensis	Eosimias sinensis is the earliest higher primate to date found in Jiangsu Province.	
2025 Asian Youth Games	Multiple cities in Bahrain	Shabab	Arabian oryx	The mascot represents host country's rich desert heritage and inspiring young people to strive for excellence in sport and in life.	
