= Bulan Loi Luean =

National and royal anthem of Siam from 1871 to 1888

English: The Floating Moon on the Sky
- บุหลันลอยเลื่อน
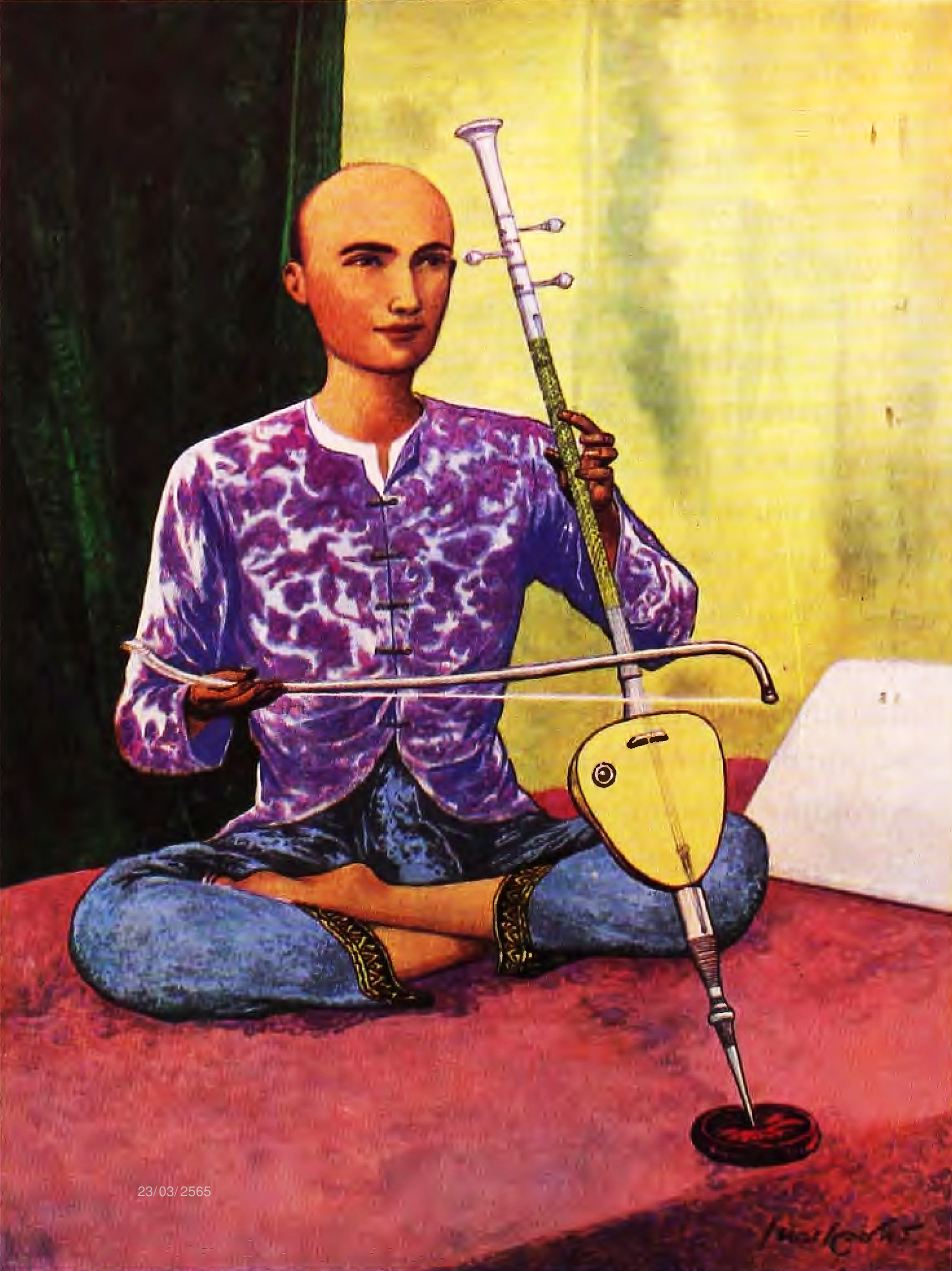
- King Rama II playing the song "Bulan Loi Luean" with his saw sam sai, illustration by Hem Vejakorn
- Former national and royal anthem of Siam
- Lyrics: Phuttaloetla Naphalai (Rama II)
- Music: Phuttaloetla Naphalai (original); Christopher Hewetson (Western arrangement), 1871
- Adopted: 1871
- Relinquished: 1888
- Preceded by: "Chom Rat Chong Charoen"
- Succeeded by: "Sansoen Phra Barami"

"Bulan Loi Luean" (Thai: บุหลันลอยเลื่อน, pronounced [bū.lǎn lɔ̄ːj lɯ̂an]) or "Bulan Luean Loi Fa" (บุหลันเลื่อนลอยฟ้า, [bū.lǎn lɯ̂an lɔ̄ːj fáː]; lit. 'The Floating Moon on the Sky') is a composition of Thai classical music traditionally credited to King Rama II. According to the traditional story, the King had a dream in which he saw the moon floating toward him and then heard beautiful music. Upon waking up, he played the music he heard in the dream and had court musicians arrange and remember the piece. The music has since been used in the classical play (lakhon nai) of Inao.

In 1871, King Chulalongkorn (Rama V) had a western arrangement of the song by English bandmaster Christopher Hewetson adopted as the royal anthem, and it became known as "Sansoen Phra Barami". The composition was used as the royal anthem until 1888, when the current royal anthem, also known as "Sansoen Phra Barami," (Note: The current anthem is distinguished as "Sansoen Phra Barami (Farang)" as opposed to "Sansoen Phra Barami (Thai)" for the previous one) was adopted. King Vajiravudh (Rama VI) later had another arrangement of Bulan Loi Luean with news lyrics adopted as the anthem of the Wild Tiger Corps in 1911, and it became known as "Sansoen Suea Pa".
