= Chaiyo =

Thai exclamation

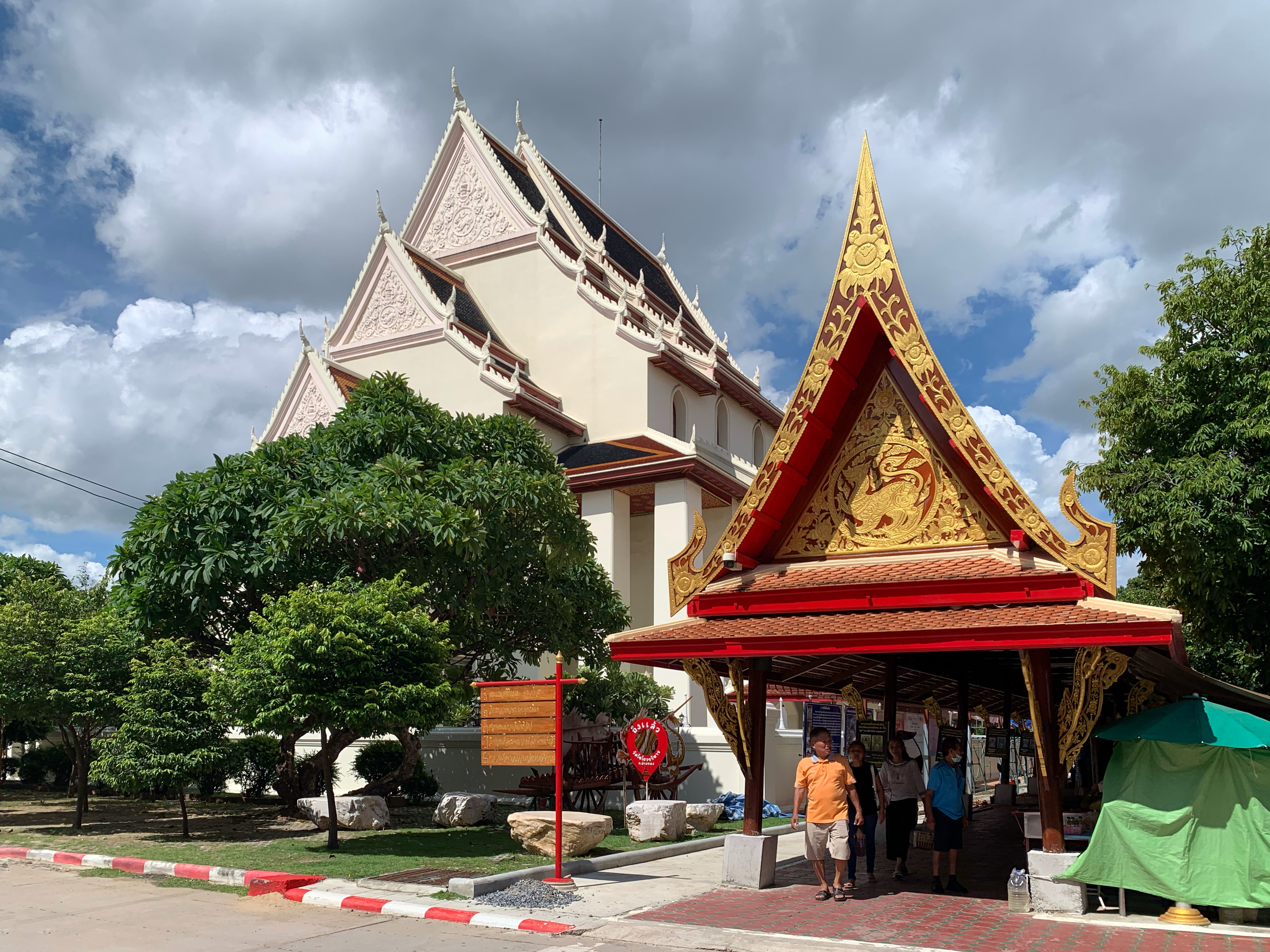
Buddhist temple Wat Chaiyo (pictured), located in Chaiyo district in Ang Thong province. The names Chaiyo here were named so to celebrate a victory in one of Naresuan's battles. (Note: It is unclear whether the name Chaiyo was initially given to the area Ban Chaiyo (Chaiyo village; later promoted to the district's name) or the prominent temple Wat Chaiyo (pictured) first, and which was subsequently named after the other.)

Chaiyo (ไชโย, pronounced [t͡ɕʰāj.jōː]) is a Thai-language exclamation used to express joy or approval, comparable to 'hurrah/hooray' in English. It is largely synonymous with chayo (ชโย, [t͡ɕʰa.jōː]), which is more often used in poetry.

The words' modern use was initiated by King Vajiravudh (Rama VI), who took inspiration from a similar word used by Indian performers in a Ramayana dance. Its first recorded use was on 28 January 1914, when the King made a pilgrimage to the newly discovered ruins of the stupa believed to mark the site of King Naresuan's legendary elephant duel (now the Don Chedi Monument in Suphan Buri Province). When his Wild Tiger Corps retinue failed to respond in unison to the traditional yodel-like call and response ho-hiw, (Note: This traditional call is still commonly used in wedding processions and other klong yao parades.) Vajiravudh instructed them to shout yo in response to the call chai, hence completing the cheer chai-yo, three times in succession (much like hip hip hooray in English). Its use subsequently spread and entered popular usage.

In later writings, Prince Damrong Rajanubhab noted that chaiyo as an interjection was actually an old term, found in Thai poetry from the reign of King Rama II (1809–1824), but which had fallen out of common usage by then. Such usage is also found in folk songs and poems of Ayutthaya, Ang Thong and Suphan Buri. According to the Royal Institute Dictionary, chayo is a variant form of ชัย (chai), itself a loanword from Pali/Sanskrit jaya (जय), meaning 'victory'.

Today, chaiyo is commonly used in celebratory toasts, especially at weddings. The poetic use of chayo remains familiar as it is the final word in the royal anthem Sansoen Phra Barami, as well as the Thai National Anthem.
