= Sanam Chandra Palace =

Coordinates: 13°49′10″N 100°2′43″E

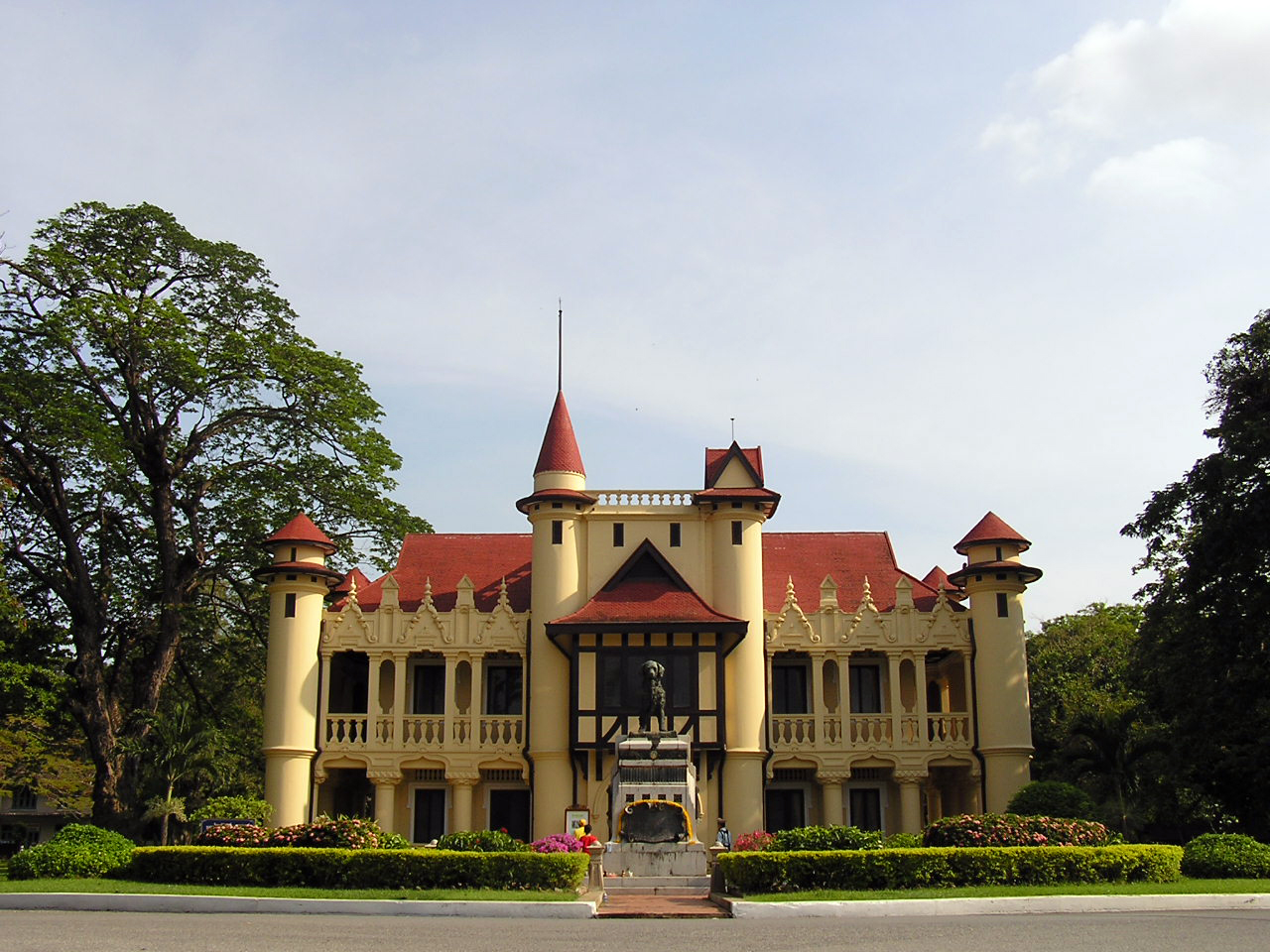
Chali Mongkol Asana (RTGS: Chali Mongkhon At), in the style of a European castle

Sanam Chandra Palace (Thai: พระราชวังสนามจันทร์; RTGS: Sanam Chan; "Moon Plaza") is a palace complex built by Vajiravudh in Nakhon Pathom province, Thailand, 56 km (35 mi) west of Bangkok. The palace complex is about a kilometer away from the Phra Pathommachedi. The complex consists of five buildings and a Ganesh shrine. Part of the palace is also the site of Silpakorn University, Sanam Chandra Palace Campus since 1965.

== History ==
=== Royal residence ===
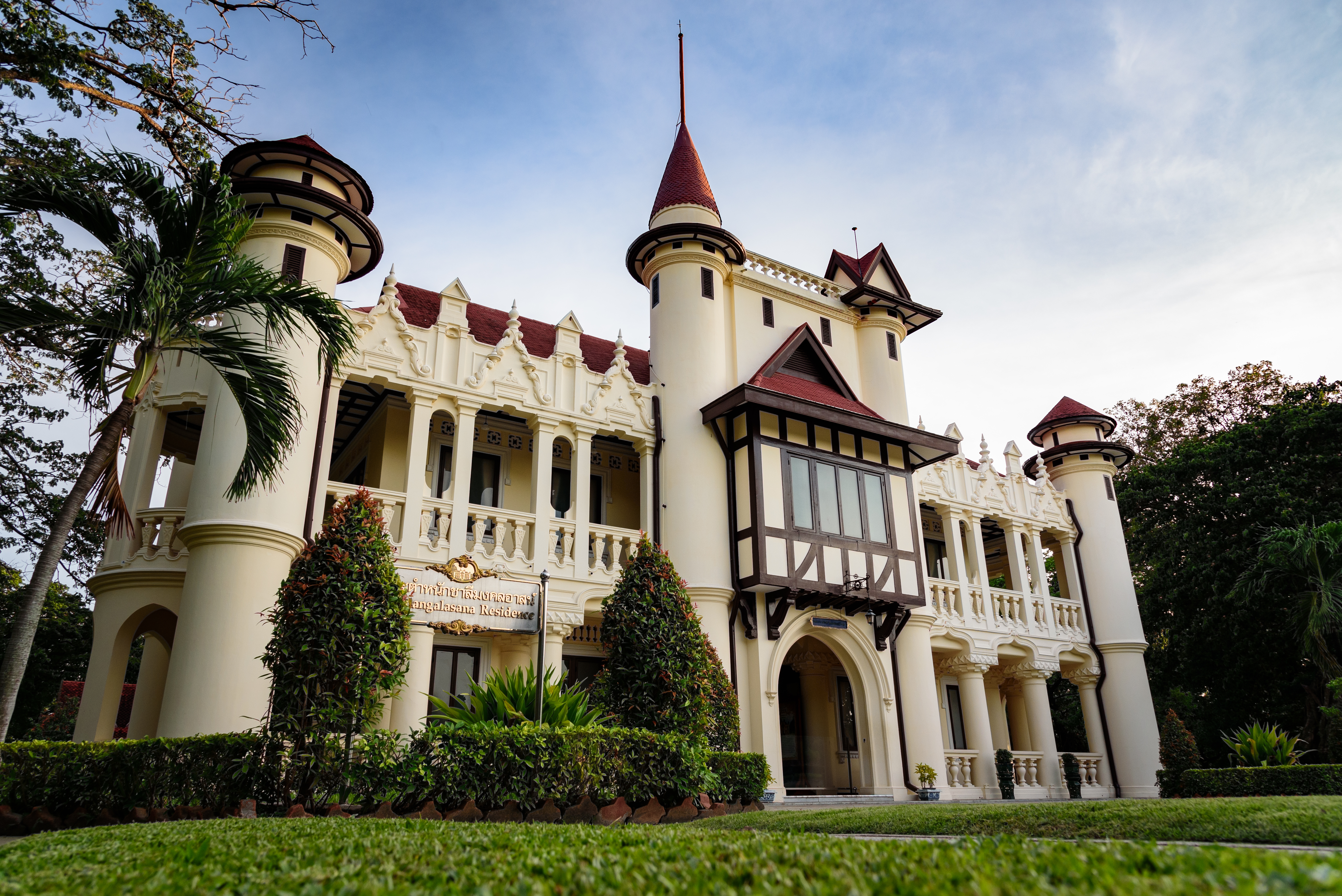
The Chaleemongkolasana Residence

Before ascending the throne, the then Crown prince Vajiravudh came to this city to pay homage to Phra Pathommachedi. He wished to build a palace here as a retreat and a residence during his pilgrimage trip to the stupa. He viewed the area as a strategic location. In 1907, he bought about 335 acres of land around Noen Prasart Hill (Thai: เนินปราสาท; RTGS: Noen Prasat; "Castle Hill") from local people. Noen Prasart Hill is believed to be the site of an ancient palace. He then had Luang Phitak Manop (Noi Silapi, later Phraya Visukam Prasit) designed and supervised the construction of the palace. The construction began in 1902 by the end of Chulalongkorn's reign (1868 – 1910). It was completed in 1911. Vajiravudh named it Sanam Chandra Palace after a natural pool nearby called "Sa Nam Chand" (Thai: สระน้ำจันทร์; RTGS: Sa Nam Chan; "Moon Pond"). In addition, the king had another plan for this palace. It was to serve not only as a retreat, but also as a stronghold during a national crisis. Here, he regularly held practices for the Wild Tiger Corps, a paramilitary troop. According to Vajiravudh's will, the palace was given to the government to be the site of military academy. However, after reign of Vajiravudh the palace has been closed and transformed to Nakhon Pathom's administrative area. Some palace halls had been dismantled and moved to National Museum in Bangkok for preservation.

=== Silpakorn University Campus ===
In 1965 Silpakorn University, a well known Thai university, for art and archaeology study, improved its educational program with additional new faculties and urgently need larger area to accommodate the expansion. The university and Thai cabinet approved to use the area of Sanam Chandra Palace to be the new university campus since the area was suitable since the palace was once belong to Vajiravudh, an archeologist and artist himself. Also in the palace ground has Ganesh Shrine, god of art and the symbol of university seal. Moreover, Nakhon Pathom is an important archaeological site for Dvaravati in Thailand.

=== Restoration ===
In 1981 Department of Fine Arts registered Sanam Chandra Palace as historical site. On December 1 st, 2003, the Committee for the Renovation of Sanam Chandra Palace chaired by Prince. Bejaratana Rajasuda, Vajiravudh's daughter, in collaboration with the Ministry of Interior, Nakhon Pathom Governor and Silpakorn University returned the palace including its satellite buildings to Bureau of the Royal Household following the wishes of Bejaratana Rajasuda. At present, the Bureau of the Royal Household has since opened the Bhimarn Prathom Residence including the Prayer Room in this residence, Samakkeemukamartaya Hall, Ganesh Shrine, Chaleemongkolasana Residence, Mareerajaratanabulung Residence, Thub Kwan Residence and Statue of Yalae, to the general public.

Sanam Chandra Palace celebrated its 100-year anniversary from November 23, 2007 to December 2, 2007.

=== Temporary Closing ===
From October 1 st, 2017, Sanam Chandra Palace is temporary closing for renovation. The reopening date is still unannounced.

== Buildings ==
=== Bhimarn Prathom Residence ===
The first hall to be built in this palace, the Bhimarn Prathom Residence (Thai: พิมานปฐม; RTGS: Phiman Pathom) is a brick-and-cement building in western style, which was adapted to suit the tropical climate. The ventilation panes and railings around the upper floor of the building are in traditional elaborate Thai carving patterns. Located upstairs are a bed chamber, a bathroom, a dressing room, a conference room, a dining room, and a prayer room. In the prayer room sits a Buddha image in the First Sermon Attitude. The exquisite angelic congregation design on the mural in the prayer room was painted by Phraya Anusart Jitrakorn (Chan Jitrakorn).

The residence frequently served as H. M. King Rama VI's private quarters (particularly before his coronation, and afterwards until 1913), his study, a reception hall, and an audience hall.

=== Samakkeemukamartaya Hall ===
The Samakkeemukkamartaya Hall (Thai: สามัคคีมุขมาตย์; RTGS: Samakkhi Mukkha Mat)

=== Chaleemongkolasana Residence ===
The Charliemongkolasana Residence is located in Sanamchandra Palace, Nakhonpathom. In 1908, this residence was built in the integration of 2 arts which are French renaissance and English half-timber. This residence was adapted for Thai weather atmosphere. At that time, the residence was named “Yah Leh Residence” which came from the name of King Rama 6 (King Vajiravudh)’s dog.

In 1915, King Rama 6 gave the name for this residence which is Charliemongkolasana residence that means “the auspicious residence of Charlie”. This residence was used for the residence of King Rama 6 when he met the Wild Tiger Corps at Sanamchandra Palace. The residence looks like a reddish-yellow small castle which has 2 floors and red roof-tile. The dining room and the living room are on the first floor. The study room, the royal bathroom and the royal bed chamber are on the second floor. The Yah Leh monument is located in front of this residence. There is a bridge that links between the Charliemongkolasana Residence and the Maleeratanabanlang Residence (Thai style residence). These two residences are the combination of Thai and Western arts.

=== Mareerajaratanabulung Residence ===
The Mareerajaratanabulung Residence (Thai: มารีราชรัตบัลลังก์; RTGS: Mari Ratcha Rat Banlang)

=== Thub Kwan Residence ===
The Thub Kwan Residence (Thai: ทับขวัญ; RTGS: Thap Khwan)

== Gallery ==
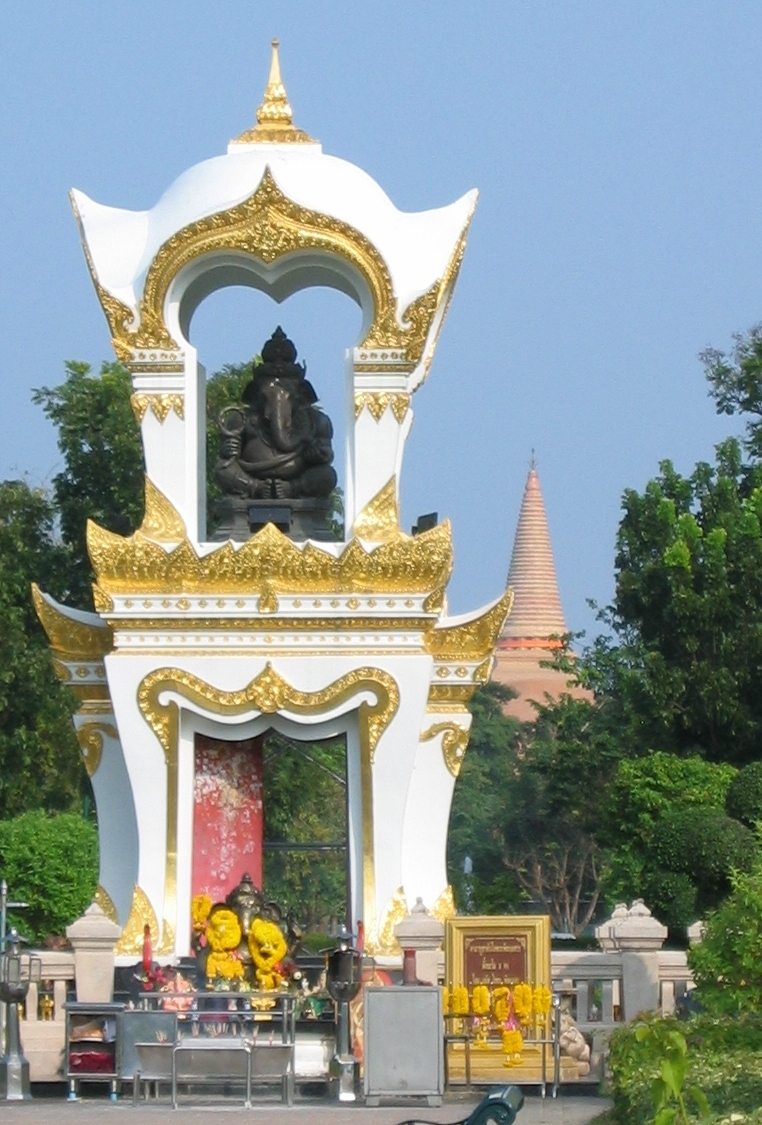
Ganesh memorial, with Phra Pathom Chedi in the background

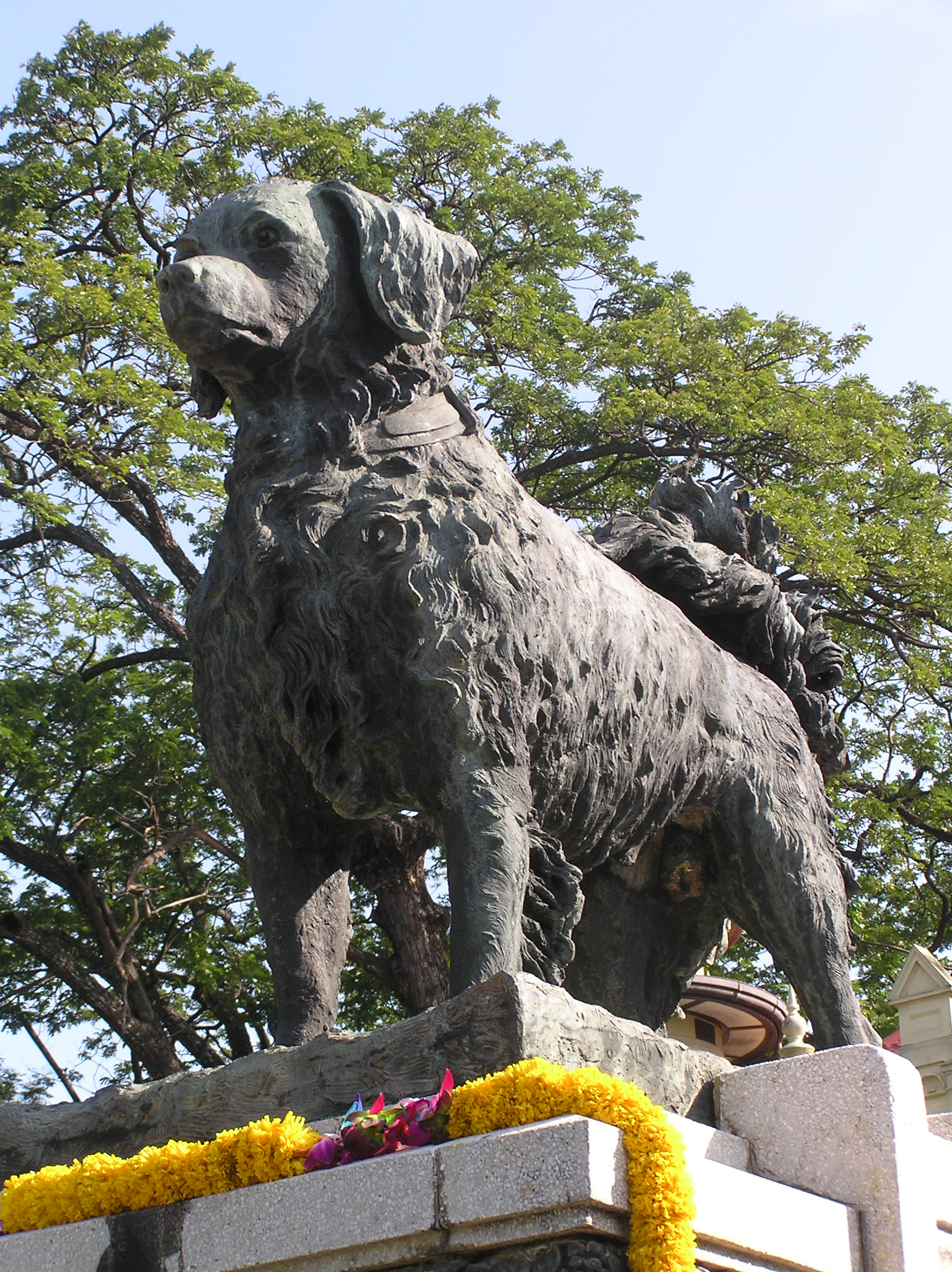
Statue of Yah Leh, beloved dog of King Rama VI

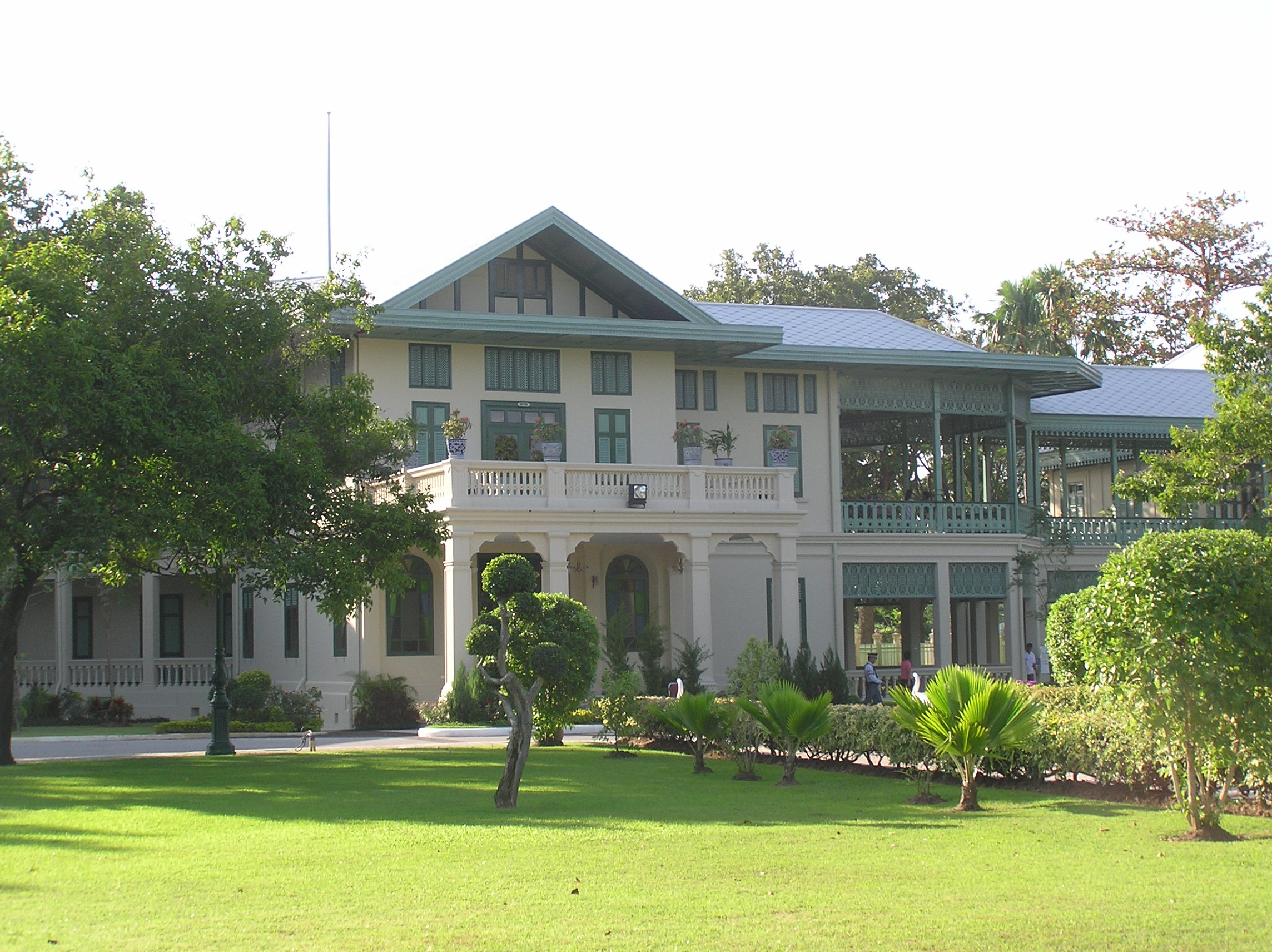
Phiman Pathom Residence

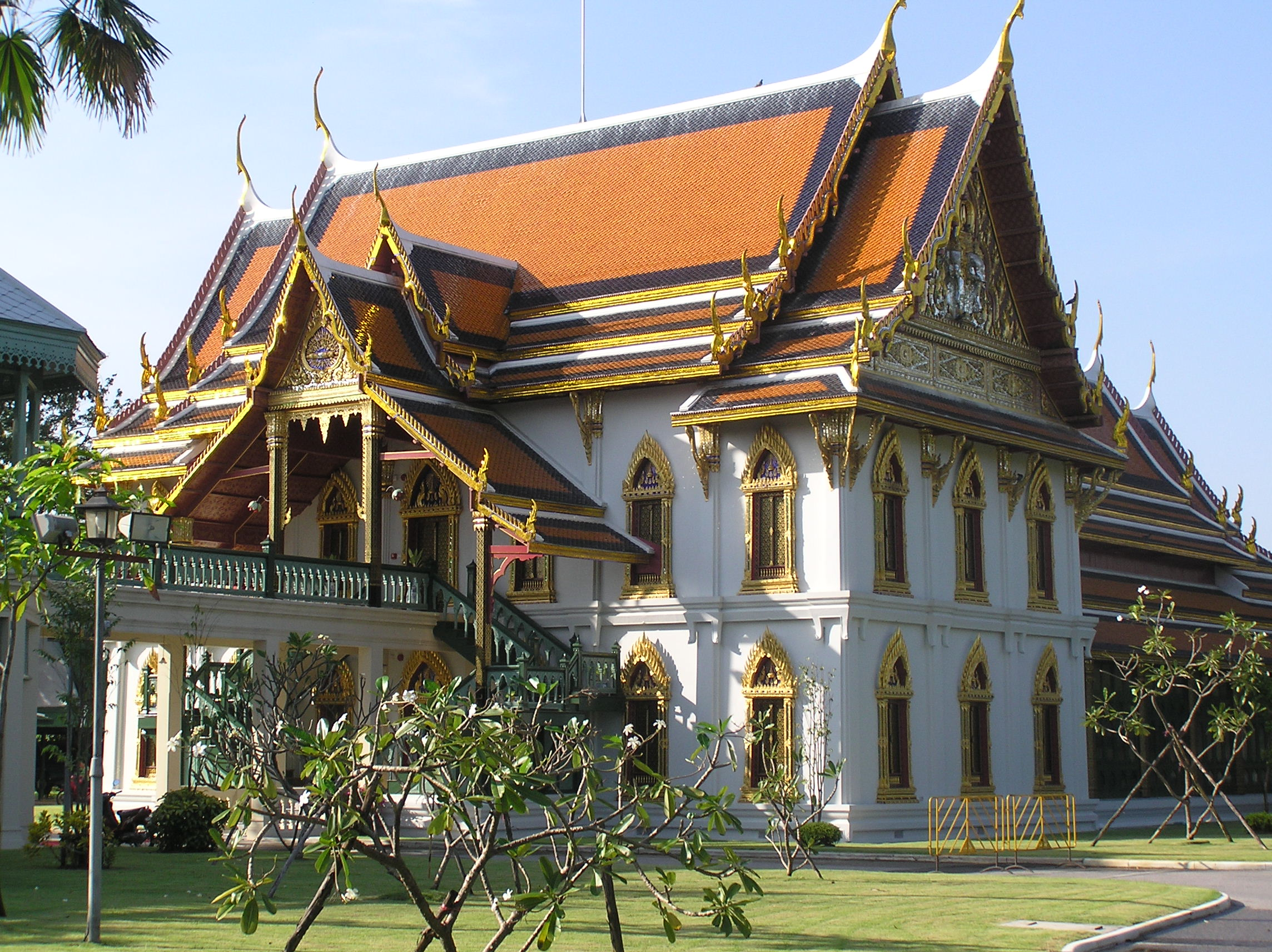
Vajariromaya Residence

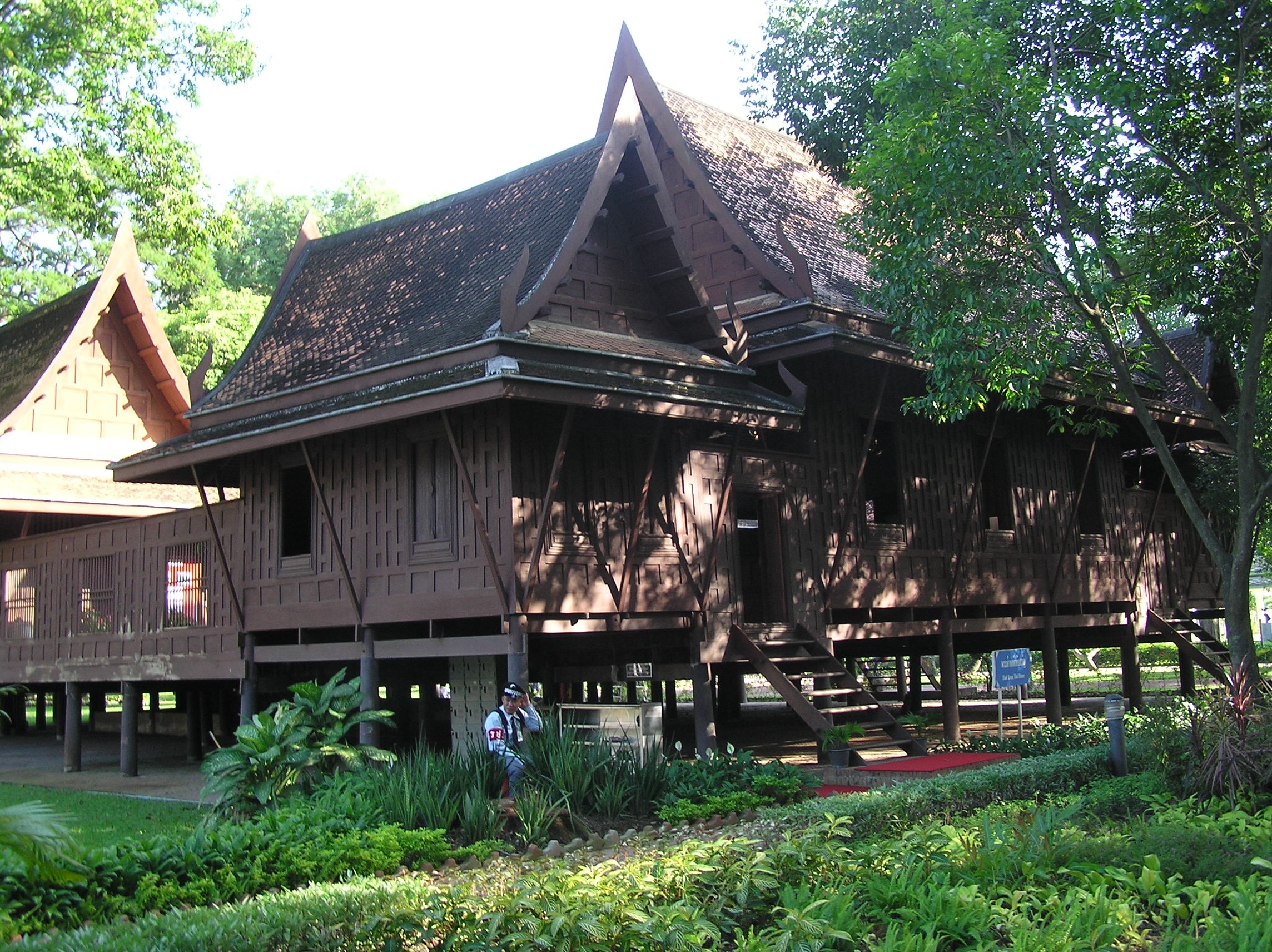
Thap Khwan Residence

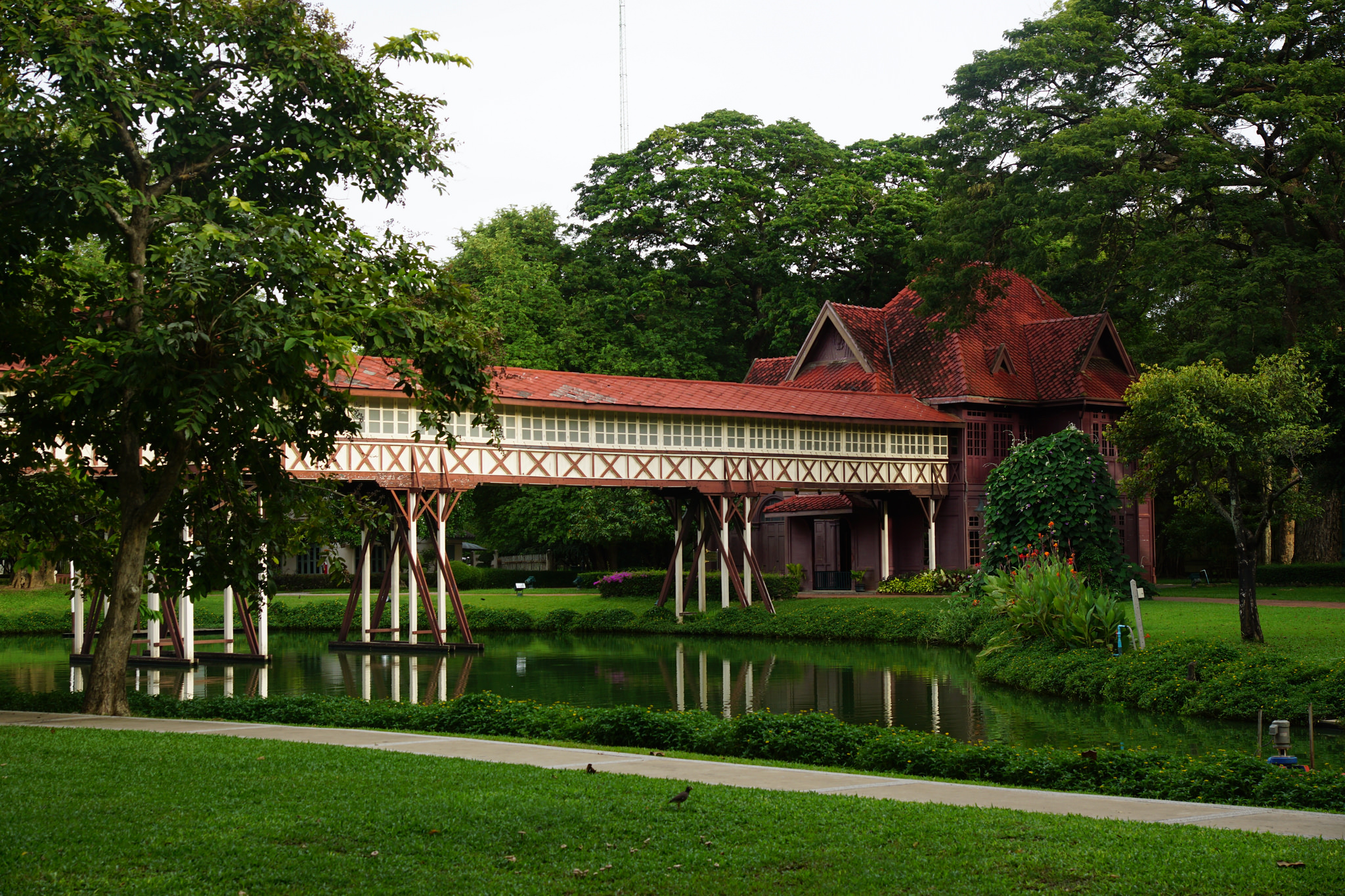
Chali Mongkol Asana's rear side
