= Sansoen Suea Pa =

March of the Wild Tiger Corps, Thailand

- Standard of the Wild Tiger Corps
- Native name: สรรเสริญเสือป่า
- Genre: March
- Text: Narisara Nuwattiwong
- Melody: Rama II and Khru Mi Khaek, arranged by Paribatra Sukhumbandhu

1911 vocal version
Sound recordings of "Sansoen Suea Pa"

Sansoen Suea Pa (Thai: สรรเสริญเสือป่า, lit: Glory to the Wild Tigers) is the march of the Wild Tiger Corps. It is a western arrangement of Bulan Loi Luean, a song composed by King Rama II (continued by Khru Mi Khaek) that was used as the royal anthem during King Rama V's reign.

The song is still performed in various ceremonies related to the Thai king (especially King Vajiravudh Rama VI), and the march composition was used in the royal funeral of King Bhumibol Adulyadej (Rama IX) and Coronation of Vajiralongkorn in 2019.

== Lyrics ==
Thai lyrics พวกเรา ประนอมกันเข้าเปนเสือป่า ตั้งสัตย์โดยจินตนา กตเวที ปู่ย่าตายายไม่เสียดายชีวี บำราบอรีเลื่องฤๅ เราฤๅจักปล่อยให้ถอยศักดิ์ได้ จะรกำ ฤ จะลำบากเท่าไร จนถึงว่าตัวจักตายเปนตาย ขณะถึงคราวควรตาย เกิดเปนชาติไทย ถึงอย่างไรไม่ยอมเปนทาษ เหตุว่าเรารักชาติ แลศาสนาเปนอาจิณ เราหนอจงอารักษ์ รัฐจักรแลพระจอมแผ่นดิน คอยผลาญสัตรูในนอกให้สิ้น แม้เสียชีพอย่าเสียสัตย์ ฯ	English translation We have united to become the Wild Tigers We vowed with our minds and grateful hearts To be like our ancestors, who did not put their lives to waste and became renowned. We will not let our honour diminish. No matter the circumstances, Even if we have to die, let it be so when the time comes. Born as Thais, no matter what, we will never be slaves Because we love our nation and religion forever. We must protect our sovereignty and our King. We strive to eliminate all enemies, internal and external alike. Even if we lose our lives, let us not lose our faith!
