= Chom Rat Chong Charoen =

National and royal anthem of Siam from 1852 to 1871

English: Long Live the Great King
- จอมราชจงเจริญ
- Former national and royal anthem of Siam
- Lyrics: Phraya Sisunthonwohan
- Music: Unknown composer (uses the melody of "God Save the King")
- Adopted: 1852
- Relinquished: 1871
- Succeeded by: "Bulan Loi Luean"

Audio sample
- "Chom Rat Chong Charoen": file; help

Chom Rat Chong Charoen (Thai: จอมราชจงเจริญ, lit. 'Long live the great king') was the royal and national anthem of the Rattanakosin Kingdom.

== History ==
In 1855, two captains, Thomas George Knox and Captain Impey, arrived in Rattanakosin and introduced the song "God Save the Queen" honouring Queen Victoria of the United Kingdom. New lyrics were written in English in honour of the King Rama V, which has shown significant evidence in the Siam Recorder.

Later, Phraya Sisunthonwohan composed the Thai lyrics to the song, which had the new title of "Chom Rat Chong Charoen".

=== Relinquishment ===
When Rama V visited British Singapore in 1871, God Save the Queen was played and it was then realised that it was the national anthem of both Britain and Siam. Upon returning to Siam, the king invited Khru Mi Khaek to discuss changing the royal and national anthem. Khru Mi Khaek decided to present "Bulan Loi Luean", a piece composed by Rama II, and decided to add a portion to the song.

== Lyrics ==
Thai	Romanisation (RTGS)	Phonetic transcription (IPA)	English translation
ความ ศุขสมบัติทั้ง บริวาร เจริญ พละปฏิภาณ ผ่องแผ้ว จง ยืนพระชนม์นาน นับรอบ ร้อยแฮ มี พระเกียรติเลิศแล้ว เล่ห์เพี้ยงเพ็ญจันทร์	Khwam suk sombat thang boriwan Charoen phala patiphan Phong phaeo Chong yuen phrachon nan Nap rop roi hae Mi phra kiat loet laeo Le phiang phen chan	kʰwaːm sùk sǒm bàt tʰáŋ bɔ̀ʔ ríʔ waːn tɕa rəːn pʰláʔ pà tìʔ pʰaːn pʰɔ̀ːŋ pʰɛ̂ːw tɕoŋ jɯːn pʰráʔ tɕʰon naːn náp rɔ̂ːp rɔ́ːj hɛː mîː práʔ kiːantìʔ lə̂ətlɛ́ɛw lêʔ pʰíːaŋ pʰen tɕan	Happiness and Wealth, Brilliance in health and wit, our King has. May he reign long; counted, and is centuries Honour for His Majesty, there is: brighter than the moon when full.

== See also ==
- Sansoen Phra Narai, a former royal anthem of Thailand
- Bulan Loi Luean, another former royal anthem of Thailand
