= Wild Tiger Corps =

Thai paramilitary unit

- กองเสือป่า
- "Maha Saradul Dhvaj" (Great Tiger Flag), the main Standard of the Wild Tiger Corps
- Active: 1 May 1911
- Disbanded: Circa 1925-1926
- Country: Siam
- Allegiance: King of Siam
- Type: Paramilitary
- Size: About 4,000 members
- Part of: Royal Household
- Garrison/HQ: Sanam Suea Pa, Dusit Palace, Bangkok
- Motto: "Don't lose your faith even if you lose your life" (Thai: เสียชีพอย่าเสียสัตย์)
- March: Sansoen Suea Pa

The Wild Tiger Corps (Thai: กองเสือป่า) was a national paramilitary corps founded in Thailand in 1911 by King Vajiravudh (Rama VI). Inspired by the British Volunteer Force, it was intended to maintain civil order.

The unit brought its Thai name from the Suea Pa Maew Mong unit founded by King Naresuan around 1600.

== History ==
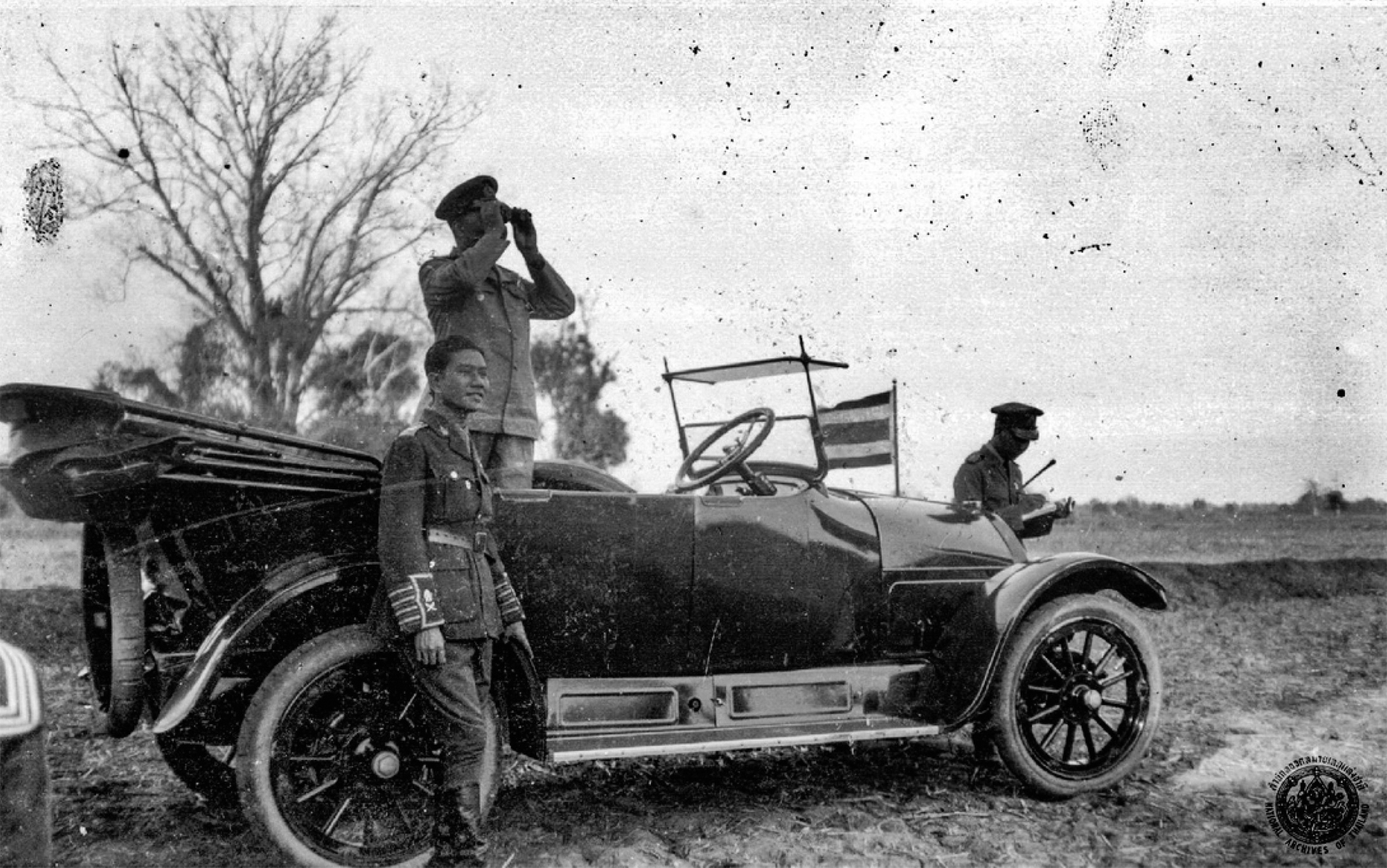
King Vajiravudh of Siam inspected a Wild Tiger Corps manoeuvre in 1921.

The corps was meant to be a nationwide paramilitary corps, answerable only to the King. At first a ceremonial guard unit, it became a military force of 4,000 within its first year. Filled with commoners, the King would often socialize with them openly. The corps eventually rivalled the army in strength and the civil service in influence. The King even went so far as appointing some to high ranks in the army and nobility.

The Wild Tiger Corps specialize in protecting the King and his family, protect the palace, hand-to-hand combat, melee combat with weapons, use of firearms, and some specialize in undercover operations in order to spy on intelligence that could pose a threat to the royal family. However, they also received combat training in infantry style such as hand and arm signals, raid, reconnaissance, tracking, and others related to infantry skills in that period.

While the King socialized with members of the corps, the regular army and aristocrats were deeply dissatisfied. Regular army officers were not permitted to join the organization. They saw these new appointments and the corps as a threat to the honour of the army. Combined with the king's spending on new palaces and attention on dramatic productions, the kingdom was deeply in debt and was in danger of financial collapse. This dissatisfaction partially led to the Palace Revolt of 1912.

The Palace Revolt of 1912 was a failed uprising, but also the first revolt against the House of Chakri from the outside the nobility. The lesson was not lost on King Vajiravudh, who quickly put up drastic measures against such threats in the future.

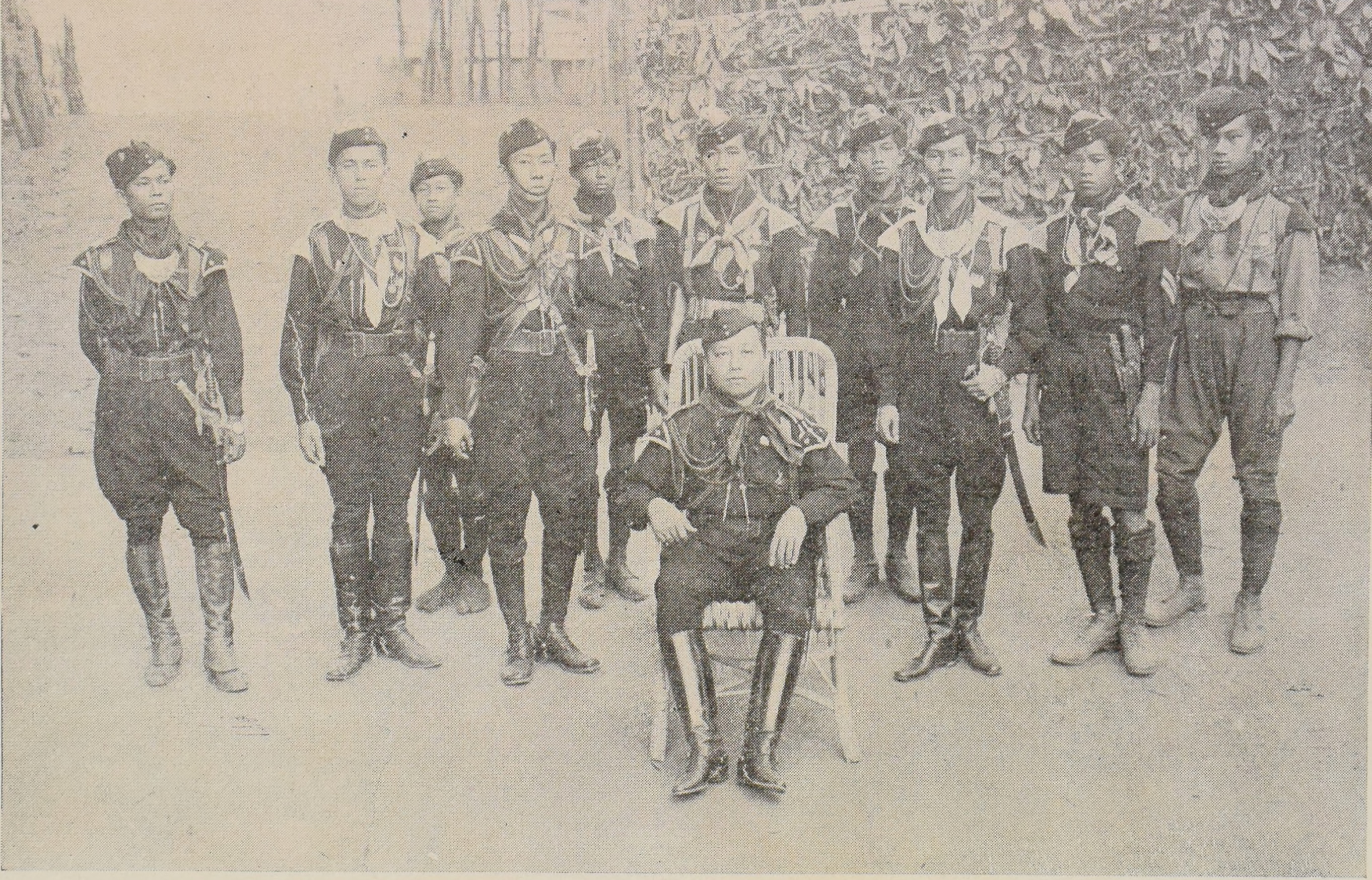
King Vajiravudh and members of the Wild Tiger Corps at Ban Pong Camp, Ratchaburi Province, in January 1915.

The Wild Tiger Corps disbanded quietly after the death of King Vajiravudh in 1925 due to lack of budget to continued the organization. Although there is no exact date of the dissolution, the Royal Thai Government Gazette published the "act of transferring properties of the Wild Tiger Corps to the National Scout Organization of Thailand of B.E.2482" in 1939.

== Organization ==
The Wild Tiger also included a junior division known as the Luk Suea ("Tiger Cubs"), now Thailand's Scouting organization.

== Ranks ==
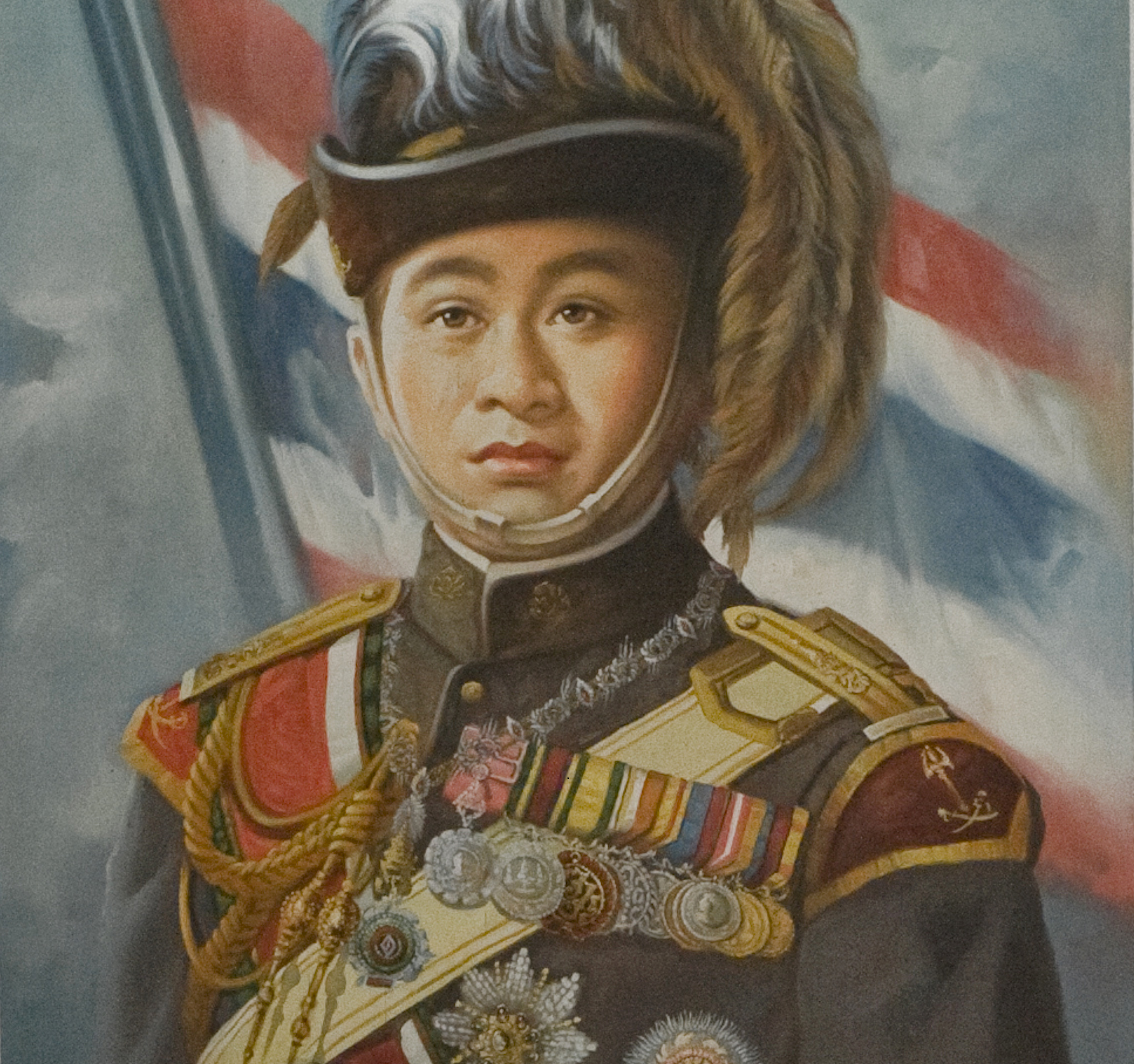
King Vajiravudh as a General in the Wild Tiger Corps.

The Wild Tiger Corps had a ranking system similar to that of the military.

- Captain-General (นายกองใหญ่): This rank was exclusively for King Vajiravudh.
- General of the Corps (นายพลเสือป่า): Created in 1915 by the King for leaders of the corps, equivalent to Brigadier General.
- Colonel (นายกองเอก)
- Lieutenant Colonel (นายกองโท)
- Major (นายกองตรี)
- Captain (นายหมวดเอก)
- Lieutenant (นายหมวดโท)
- Second Lieutenant (นายหมวดตรี)
- Acting Second Lieutenant (ว่าที่นายหมวดตรี)
- Third Lieutenant (นายหมู่ใหญ่)
- Sergeant (นายหมู่เอก): The highest enlisted rank.
- Corporal (นายหมู่โท)
- Lance Corporal (นายหมู่ตรี)
- Corp (พลเสือป่า)

== Legacy ==
The present-day Volunteer Defense Corps uses the same rank structure as the Wild Tigers, but with different insignia.

== See also ==
- Palace Revolt of 1912
- Vajiravudh
- Monarchy of Thailand

== Sources ==
- Thai Scouting – History
