= Damrong Rajanubhab =

Thai prince, historian, and public administrator (1862–1943)

Tisavarakumara ดิศวรกุมาร
- Prince Damrong Rajanubhab
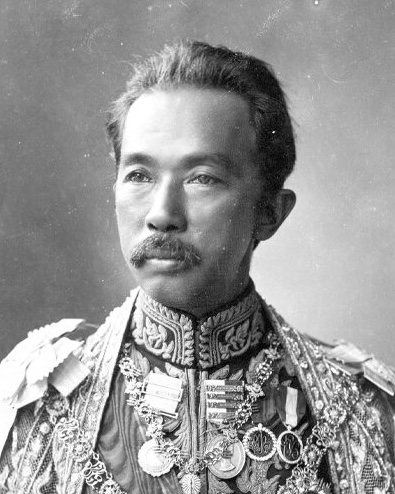

Minister of Interior
- In office: 1 April 1892 – 8 August 1915
- Predecessor: None
- Successor: Choey Kalayanamitr

Minister of the Privy Seal
- In office: 29 June 1923 – 23 March 1925
- Predecessor: Nares Varariddhi
- Successor: None (office abolished)

Grand-officer to the Army
- In office: 8 April 1887 – April 1890
- Predecessor: None
- Successor: Surasakmontri (as the army department commander)

Supreme Councillor of State
- In office: 28 November 1925 – 17 July 1932

Privy Councillor
- In office: 7 May 1887 – 17 July 1932
- Born: 21 June 1862; Bangkok, Siam
- Died: 1 December 1943 (aged 81); Bangkok, Thailand
- Spouse: 11 consorts
- Issue: 37 sons and daughters
Names
- His Royal Highness Prince Ditsawarakuman
- House: Diskul (Chakri dynasty)
- Father: Mongkut (Rama IV)
- Mother: Consort Chum

Prince Tisavarakumara, the Prince Damrong Rajanubhab (Thai: สมเด็จพระเจ้าบรมวงศ์เธอ พระองค์เจ้าดิศวรกุมาร กรมพระยาดำรงราชานุภาพ; RTGS: Ditsawarakuman Damrongrachanuphap (Note: Full transcription is "Somdet Phrachao Borommawongthoe Phra-ongchao Ditsawarakuman Kromphraya Damrongrachanuphap" (สมเด็จพระเจ้าบรมวงศ์เธอ พระองค์เจ้าดิศวรกุมาร กรมพระยาดำรงราชานุภาพ))) (21 June 1862 – 1 December 1943) was the founder of the modern Thai educational system as well as the modern provincial administration. He was an autodidact, a (self-taught) historian, and one of the most influential Thai intellectuals of his time.

Born as Phra Ong Chao Tisavarakumara (พระองค์เจ้าดิศวรกุมาร; "Prince Tisavarakumarn"), a son of King Mongkut with Consort Chum (เจ้าจอมมารดาชุ่ม; Chao Chom Manda Chum), a lesser royal wife; he initially learned Thai and Pali from private tutors, and English at the Royal School with Mr. Francis George Patterson. At the age of 14, he received his formal education in a special palace school created by his half-brother, King Chulalongkorn. He was given posts in the royal administration at an early age, becoming the commander of the Royal Guards Regiment in 1880 at age 18, and after several years, he worked at building army schools as well as modernizing the army in general. In 1887, he was appointed as grand-officer to the army (commander-in-chief). At the same time, he was chosen by the king to become the Minister of Education in his provisional cabinet. When King Chulalongkorn began his administrative reform program in 1892, Prince Damrong was chosen to lead the Ministry of the North (Mahatthai), which was converted into the Ministry of the Interior in 1894.

In his time as minister, he completely overhauled provincial administration. Many minor provinces were merged into larger ones, the provincial governors lost most of their autonomy when the post was converted into one appointed and salaried by the ministry, and a new administrative division—the monthon (circle) covering several provinces—was created. Formal education of administrative staff was introduced. Prince Damrong was among the most important advisors of the king, and considered second only to him in power.

== Political climate in Siam (1855–1893) ==
Legal traditions made little if any sense to foreigners. Nor did they have knowledge of the ancient political climate. Nor aware that the Bowring Treaty, which nearly all considered a significant advancement, had accomplished none of its objectives and had been set-back for the Siamese for the ensuing decades. Monthon reforms met with resistance, complicated by French interference in Siamese authority.

== Foreign advisers ==
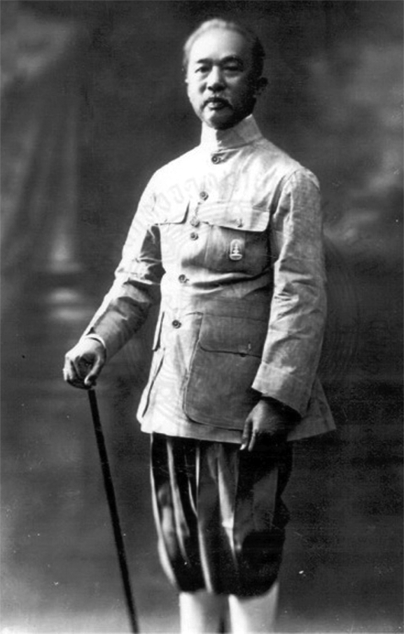
Prince Damrong Rajanubhab in 1900.

Prince Damrong went to Europe in search of a European general advisor for the king by way of the Suez Canal. In December 1891, during a lunch hosted by the British ambassador to Egypt, Damrong met Gustave Rolin-Jaequemyns, who had edited the first issue of Revue de Droit International et de Législation Comparée ("Review of International Law and Comparative Legislation"), which had appeared late-1868 with contributions from many noted scholars. Following a hasty correspondence with Bangkok, the prince was able to offer Rolin-Jaequemyns an annual salary of £3,000. Among his successors were Edward Strobel, the first American adviser in foreign affairs, followed by Jens Westengard, after whose tenure the position was downgraded to Adviser in Foreign Affairs, then Wolcott Pitkin, Eldon James, and Francis B. Sayre. After Damrong recruited Rolin-Jaequemyns, however, the advisers worked under Foreign Minister Devawongse Vaprokar and were recruited principally by their predecessors through Harvard connections. Strobel, Westengard, James, and Sayre were all Harvard law professors.

== Minister of the Interior ==
The King had been impressed by the way Damrong organized the re-equipment of Thai artillery in his military capacity and how he successfully managed three schools and then the education ministry. Consequently, he promoted Damrong over the heads of the prince's older half brothers. Prince Damrong was appointed Minister of the North in 1892 as part of a larger reform of the government. In 1894 the Southern and Western provinces were transferred to Damrong's ministry, which became the Ministry of Interior. Damrong changed the character of the department by retiring older officials and replacing them with men loyal to him, more formally training hereditary provincial nobles for their administrative responsibilities, and taking a meritocratic approach to promotion, insisting that paths of promotion should be open to clerks. He also reorganized the ministry into a superintending Central Department, a Legal Department to deal with border incidents and extraterritoriality, and a Department of Provincial Administration. He attempted to prune the ministry of departments that were not relevant to provincial administration. However, the ministry soon took over functions normally assigned to other ministries because their operations required the cooperation of Interior staff and because of Damrong's reputation for competence. Examples included Provincial Revenue, Irrigation, Forestry, Mines, and a provincial Gendarmerie.

Damrong's most important reform, however, was the creation of the thesaphiban system by which the provincial administration was professionalized and made responsible to and dependent on the central government. The system was named after the thesaphiban or superintendent commissioners who exercised authority over in which groups of provinces called monthon or circles. An 1892 tour of northern provinces convinced Damrong that the provincial government was almost completely decoupled from the central government and in desperate need of reform. Through the 1890s, he created monthon and appointed thesaphiban. Administration was divided into judicial, financial, and administrative spheres and each thesaphiban had a commissioner for each of these divisions. Damrong and the thesaphiban also attacked the independence of provincial nobility by taking over their sources of revenue, such as judicial fees and transit duties, then using some of this money to pay them salaries. These provincial notables were then taken into the provincial administration and frequently transferred to other provinces, severing traditional local ties. Damrong and his ministry also sought to appoint Interior officials to run districts (the administrative division below provinces) and to have locally elected elders take responsibility for keeping the peace and collect taxes at the commune and village levels. These changes were formalized countrywide in the Ministry of Interior regulations of 1899, turning provincial governors from semi-independent nobles to officials of the central government. These reforms resulted in doubling of state revenue, the extension of some social services, and increased security in the provinces.

== Later years ==
After the death of King Chulalongkorn in 1910, the relationship with his successor King Vajiravudh was less productive. Prince Damrong finally resigned in 1915 from his post at the ministry, officially due to health problems, since otherwise the resignation would have looked like an affront to the monarch.

During the brief reign of King Prajadhipok, the prince proposed that the king found the Royal Institute, mainly to look after the National Library and the museums. He became the first president of the Royal Institute of Thailand. He was given the title Somdet Phra Chao Borommawong Thoe Krom Phraya Damrong Rajanubhab by King Prajadhipok in recognition to his work. This became the name by which he is generally known.

In the following years, Damrong worked as a self-educated historian, as well as writing books on Thai literature, culture and arts. Out of his works grew the National Library, as well as the National Museum. He is considered the father of Thai history. The "Damrong school" has been characterized by Thai historian Nithi Aeusrivongse as combining "the legacy of the royal chronicle with history as written in the West during the nineteenth century, creating a royal/national history to serve the modern Thai state under the absolute monarchy." Although foundational to Thai history, his work is now often seen as overly nationalistic and exclusive of marginalized actors.

Being one of the main apologists for absolute monarchy, after the Siamese revolution of 1932 which introduced Constitutional monarchy in the kingdom, Damrong was exiled to Penang in British Malaysia. In 1942, after the old establishment had substantially regained power from the 1932 reformists, he was allowed to return to Bangkok, where he died one year later.

Prince Damrong is credited as the father of Thai history, the education system, the health system (the Ministry of Health was originally a department of the Ministry of the Interior) and the provincial administration. He also had a major role in crafting Bangkok's anti-democratic state ideology of "Thainess".

On the 1962 centenary of his birth, he became the first Thai to be included in the UNESCO list of the world's most distinguished persons. On 28 November 2001, to honour the contributions the prince made to the country, the government declared that 1 December would thereafter be known as "Damrong Rajanupab Day".

His many descendants use the royal surname Tisakula or Diskul (Thai: ดิศกุล).

== Writings ==
Prince Damrong wrote countless books and articles, of which only a few are available in English translation:

- Our Wars with the Burmese: Thai-Burmese Conflict 1539–1767, ISBN 974-7534-58-4
- Journey through Burma in 1936: A View of the Culture, History and Institutions, ISBN 974-8358-85-2
- Stories of Archeology: A Collection of True Stories, (Title in Thai:นิทานโบราณคดี), ISBN 978-616-514-533-6
- H. R. H. Prince Damrong (1904). "The Foundation of Ayuthia" (PDF). Journal of the Siam Society. JSS Vol. 1.0e (digital). Siam Heritage Trust.
- Wright, Arnold (2008) [1908]. Wright, Arnold; Breakspear, Oliver T (eds.). Twentieth century impressions of Siam (PDF). London&c: Lloyds Greater Britain Publishing Company. for which Prince Damrong offered advice and images

== Honours ==
=== National honours ===
Prince Damrong received these honours and medals from the Honours System:

- Thailand:
  - Knight of the Order of the Royal House of Chakri (1886)
  - Knight of the Order of the Nine Gems (1901)
  - Knight Grand Cordon of the Order of Chula Chom Klao (1900)
  - Knight of the Ratana Varabhorn Order of Merit (1911)
  - Knight Grand Cordon of the Order of the White Elephant (1913)
  - Knight Grand Cordon of the Order of the Crown of Thailand (1923)
  - Knight of the Vajira Mala Order (1911)
  - Dushdi Mala Medal Pin of Services to the Monarch (Military) (1893)
  - Dushdi Mala Medal Pin of Arts and Science (Military) (1890)
  - Dushdi Mala Medal Pin of Arts and Science (Civilian) (1890)
  - Dushdi Mala Medal Pin of Services to the Monarch (Civilian) (1899)
  - Chakra Mala Medal (1893)
  - Saratul Mala Medal (1925)
  - King Rama IV Royal Cypher Medal (1904)
  - King Rama V Royal Cypher Medal (1908)
  - King Rama VI Royal Cypher Medal (1910)
  - King Rama VII Royal Cypher Medal (1926)
  - Queen's Medal (1898)
  - Recipient of the King Rama VII Coronation Medal (1926)

=== Foreign Honours ===
- Russian Empire:
  - Knight 1st Class of the Order of Saint Alexander Nevsky (1892)
  - Knight 1st Class of the Order of Saint Anna (1892)
- German Empire:
  - Grand Cross of the Order of the Red Eagle (1892)
- Ottoman Empire:
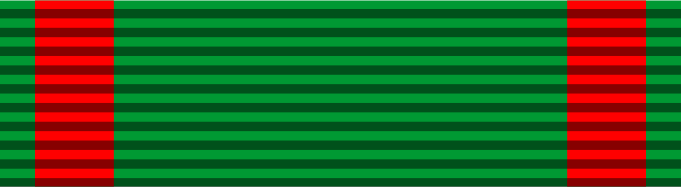
  - 1st Class of the Order of Osmanieh (1892)
- Kingdom of Italy:
  - Knight Grand Cross of the Order of Saints Maurice and Lazarus (1892)
  - Grand Cross of the Order of the Crown of Italy (1896)
- Kingdom of Greece:
  - Grand Cross of the Order of Saints George and Constantine (1892)
- Denmark:
  - Grand Cross of the Order of the Dannebrog (1892)
  - Knight of the Order of the Elephant (1930)
- France:
  - Grand Officer of the Legion of Honour (1892)
- Japan:
  - Grand Cordon of the Order of the Rising Sun (1895)

== Tributes to Damrong Rajanubhab ==
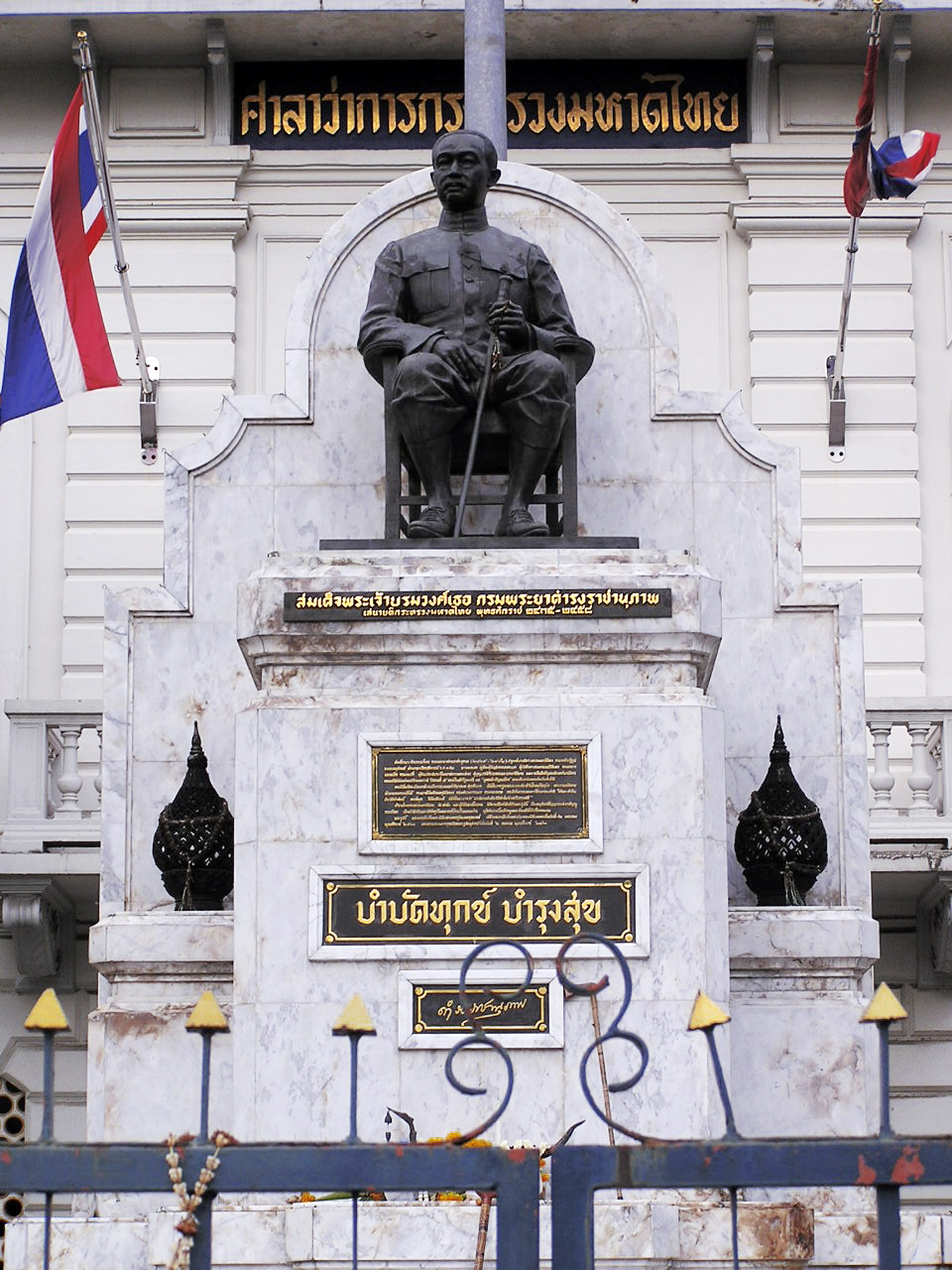
Royal Monument of Prince Tisavarakumarn, Prince Damrong Rajanubhab at the Ministry of Interior

== See also ==
- Varadis Palace

== Notes ==
Tisavarakumara, the Prince Damrong Rajanubhab House of Diskul Cadet branch of the House of Chakri Born: 21 June 1862 Died: 1 December 1943
Political offices
New creation	Minister of Interior; 1892–1915	Succeeded by Surasivisitthasak
Preceded by Naresr Varariddhi	Minister of the Privy Seal; 1923–1925	Office abolished
Military offices
New creation	Grand-officer to the army 1887–1890	Next: Surasakmontri as Chief of the Army Department
Academic offices
First	President of the Royal Society; 1926–1932	Vacant Title next held by Anuman Rajadhon
Honorary titles
Preceded by The Prince Bongsadisramahip	Eldest Royal Member of the Chakri Dynasty; 1936–1943	Succeeded by Queen Sri Savarindira
