= Nares Varariddhi =

Thai prince, diplomat, and government official (1855–1925)

Krisda Bhiniharn กฤษดาภินิหาร
- Prince Nares Varariddhi
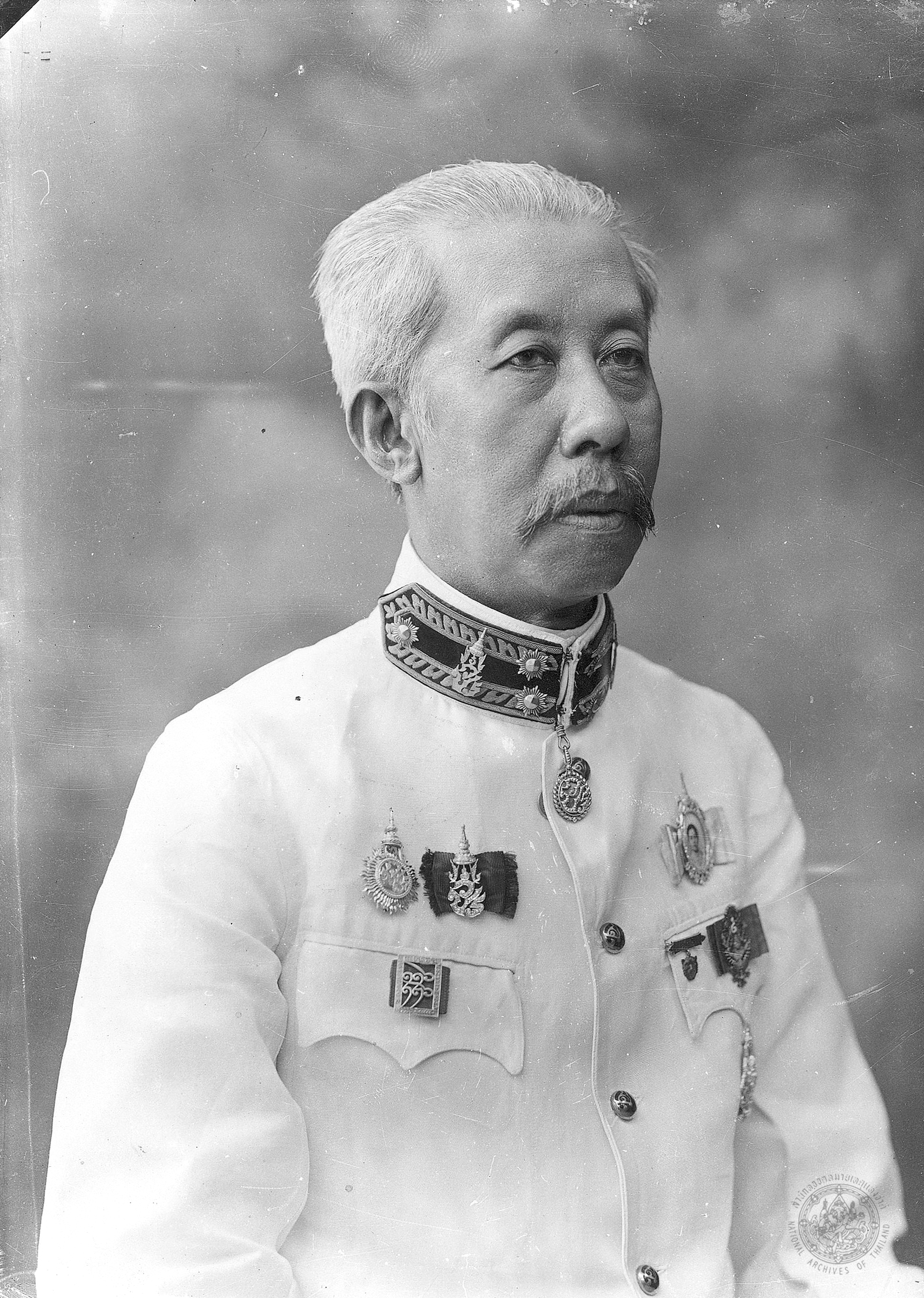
- Nares Varariddhi in 1912

Minister of the Privy Seal
- In office: 1 April 1912 – 28 June 1923
- Predecessor: Bidyalabha Prueddhidhata
- Successor: Damrong Rajanubhab

Officer of the state
- In office: 29 June 1910 – 23 March 1925

Envoy to the Court of St James's in London
- In office: 1883– 1887
- Predecessor: Prisdang
- Successor: Phraya Mahayotha (Nokkaew Kochasenee)

Envoy to the United States of America
- In office: 1884
- Predecessor: Prisdang
- Successor: Phraya Mahayotha (Nokkaew Kochasenee)
- Born: 7 May 1855; Bangkok, Siam
- Died: 10 August 1925 (aged 70); Bangkok, Siam
- Spouse: 3 consorts
- Issue: 20 sons and daughters
- House: Kritakara (Chakri dynasty)
- Father: Mongkut (Rama IV)
- Mother: Sonklin Kashaseniya

Prince Krisda Bhiniharn, the Prince Nares Varariddhi (Note: His birth name was Phra Ong Chao Krisda Bhiniharn, RTGS: Kritsadaphinihan, Thai: พระองค์เจ้ากฤษฎาภินิหาร; his highest krom title was Krommaphra Nares Varariddhi, RTGS: Naret Worarit, กรมพระนเรศวรฤทธิ์.) (7 May 1855 – 10 August 1925) was a Thai prince and government official who served as diplomat and held several ministerships in the newly restructured government of King Chulalongkorn (Rama V), who was his half-brother (both were sons of King Mongkut). He served as Envoy Extraordinary and Minister Plenipotentiary to the United Kingdom and to the United States, and as Minister of Metropolitan Affairs, of Public Works, and of the Privy Seal. He is best remembered for laying the foundations for the modern Royal Thai Police, and is the progenitor of the Kritakara family.

== Birth ==
Prince Nares Varariddhi, born as Prince Krisda Bhiniharn, was born on 7 May 1855. He was the son of King Mongkut and Consort Klin (เจ้าจอมมารดากลิ่น; Chao Chom Manda Klin), who was the daughter of Phraya Damrong Ratchapalakanta (Jui Kochasenee), granddaughter of Chaophraya Mahayotha (Toria Kochasenee) and great grand daughter of Chao Phraya Mahayotha (Cheng Kochasenee).

== Death ==
He resided at Wang Maliwan until his death on 10 August 1925, at the age of 70. Around the same time, his mother, Consort Klin, also died in the same year.

Their funeral urns were placed side by side in the main hall of Wang Maliwan. His royal cremation ceremony was held at the royal crematorium at Wat Benchamabophit.

== Decorations ==
=== National decorations ===
- 1882 - Knight of the Order of the Royal House of Chakri
- 1893 - Knight of the Order of the Nine Gems
- 1909 - Knight Grand Cordon of the Most Illustrious Order of Chula Chom Klao
- 1911 - Knight of the Ratana Varabhorn Order of Merit
- 1913 - Knight Grand Cordon of the Most Exalted Order of the White Elephant
- 1886 - Knight Grand Cordon of the Most Noble Order of the Crown of Thailand
- 1911 - Member of the Vajira Mala Order
- 1904 - King Rama IV Royal Cypher Medal
- 1908 - King Rama V Royal Cypher Medal
- 1910 - King Rama VI Royal Cypher Medal
- 1893 - Dushdi Mala Medal Pin of Arts and Science (Civilian)
- 1904 - Dushdi Mala Medal Pin of Services to the Monarch (Civilian)
- 1903 - Chakrabarti Mala Medal
- 1882 - Satabarsa Mala Medal
- 1893 - Rachada Bhisek Medal
- 1897 - Prabas Mala Medal
- 1898 - Rajini Medal
- 1903 - Dvidha Bhisek Medal
- 1907 - Rajamangala Medal
- 1908 - Rajamangala Bhisek Medal
- 1911 - King Rama VI Coronation Medal

=== Foreign decorations ===
- Kingdom of Portugal:
  - 1879 - Commander of the Order of the Immaculate Conception of Vila Viçosa
- Kingdom of Italy:
  - 1892 - Knight Grand Cross of the Order of the Crown of Italy
- Japan:
  - 1894 - Order of the Paulownia Flowers
- Duchy of Brunswick :
  - 1909 - Grand Cross of the Order of Henry the Lion
