= Sunthonwohan =

Sunthonwohan (Thai: สุนทรโวหาร, from Pali: sundara 'beautiful' + vohāra 'common use of language') is a Thai noble title granted to some heads of the Royal Scribes Department. People who held the title include:

- Phraya Sisunthonwohan (Fak), royal scribe under King Rama IV (r. 1851–1868).
- Phra Sunthonwohan (Phu), commonly known as Sunthorn Phu, court poet during the reign of King Rama II, later served as royal scribe under Second-King Pinklao. Held the title c. 1851–1855.
- Phraya Sisunthonwohan (Noi Acharyankura), writer and educator during the reigns of kings Rama IV and Rama V. Held the title 1879–1891.
- Phraya Sisunthonwohan (Kamon Salakshna), son of Fak, government official under kings Rama V and Rama VI. Held the title 1893–1916.
- Phraya Sisunthonwohan (Phan Salakshna), son of Kamon, government official under King Rama VI. Held the title 1916–1923.
