= Emblem of Thailand =

Emblem of Thailand; ตราแผ่นดินของไทย

Versions
- Variant with broader wings (displayed by a firm bearing a Royal warrant)
- Armiger: Vajiralongkorn (Rama X), King of Thailand
- Adopted: Officially in 1911, replacing the coat of arms of Siam from 1873. Originally adopted during the Ayutthaya period.
- Shield: A Garuda gules with wings displayed and elevated armed and crowned or, clothed or and azure.
- Use: Used by the government of Thailand on all official documents, is on the Royal Standard of Thailand and is used by The Monarchy of Thailand

The national emblem of Thailand (Thai: ตราแผ่นดินของไทย), the arms of dominion of the Thai monarch (currently Vajiralongkorn), is called the พระครุฑพ่าห์ (RTGS transcription: Phra Khrut Pha; "Garuda as the vehicle" (of Vishnu)). The Garuda was officially adopted as the national emblem by Vajiravudh (Rama VI) in 1911. However, the mythical creature had been used as a symbol of royalty in Thailand for centuries. The Garuda is depicted on seals, which are used by the King and the Government of Thailand to authenticate official documents and as its primary emblem.

The Garuda is a mythological beast of the Hindu and Buddhist tradition. According to Hindu mythology, the Garuda is the vahana (vehicle) of the god Vishnu (Narayana). The ancient kings of Thailand believed in divine kingship, and considered themselves the incarnation of the god Narayana. Thus, the Garuda came to symbolise the divine power and authority of the king.

The Garuda also features in the national emblem of Indonesia and the emblem of the city of Ulaanbaatar.

== Symbolism ==
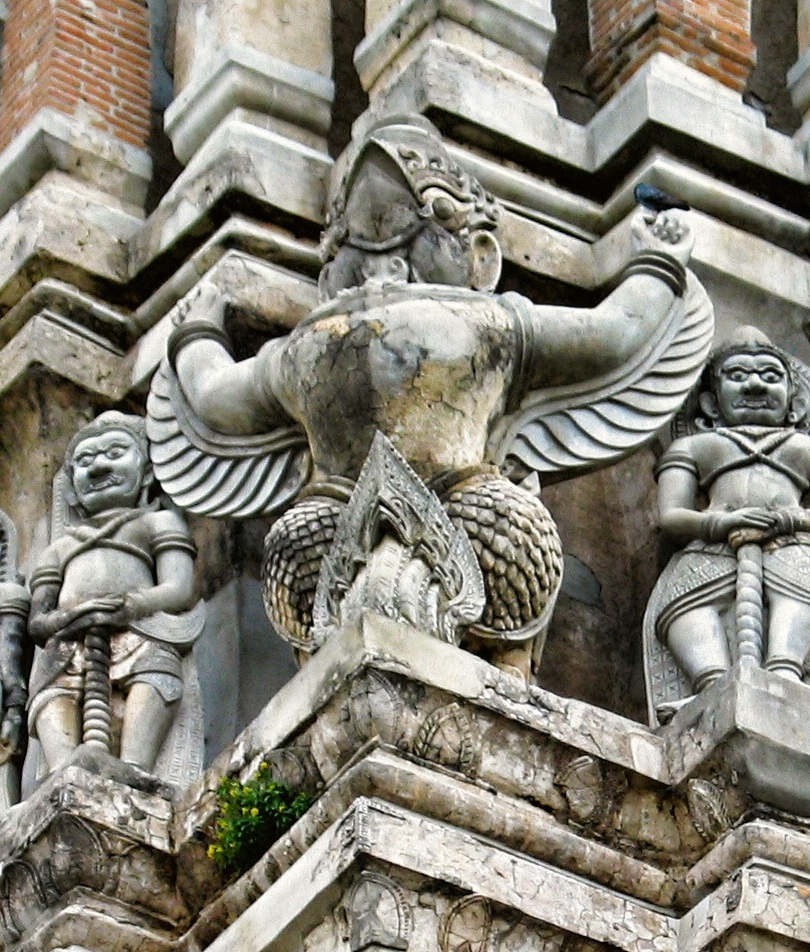
A Garuda decoration on the prang of the 15th century Wat Ratchaburana, Ayutthaya Historical Park.

The Garuda is a birdlike mythological beast of the Hindu and Buddhist tradition. According to mythology, the Garuda is a large hybrid half-man and half-bird creature. The Garuda is often depicted in art as having the head, beak, wings and talons of an eagle, while his torso is like that of a human man. In the book Traiphum Phra Ruang, a Thai Buddhist literary work composed in the 14th century, he is described as having a body that was 150 yojanas across (1 yojana equivalent to 1.6 kilometres), his left and right wings 150 yojanas each, his tail 60 yojanas long, his neck 30 yojanas, his beak 90 yojanas and his talons 12 yojanas each.

The Garuda's physical strength and martial prowess is recounted in the Sanskrit Puranas. In these stories he is described as the most powerful of all the winged-creatures and as such is regarded as the king of all the birds. In Buddhist literature, the Garuda lives in the legendary Himavanta forest and is regarded as semi-divine or supernatural. In the Buddhist tradition the emphasis is put on the Garuda's deeds, which portray him as a righteous and merciful being.

According to the Mahabharata, the Garuda was so powerful that no god could defeat him in battle, eventually the Hindu god Vishnu intervened. Impressed with his abilities, Vishnu made the Garuda immortal and promised him a higher seat than that of his own. Henceforth, the Garuda became the 'vahana' or vehicle of Vishnu and was allowed to sit atop the god's flagpole as a reward.

The Garuda's relationship with Vishnu or Narayana is especially significant. The doctrine of ancient Thai kingship was heavily influenced by those of India. Accordingly, the king was nothing less than an 'avatar' or incarnation of god, just as King Rama of the epic Ramayana was the incarnation of Narayana. Thus, the god Narayana and the Garuda became the accepted symbol of divine and sacred kingship in ancient Thailand.

== Royal seals ==
Cabinet Secretary affixes the seals to the 2007 Constitution after it was signed by the King and countersigned by the Parliament Speaker, 2007.

During the Ayutthaya Kingdom (1350–1767), the king had in his possession several seals (ตรา, tra) of various designs. These stamp seals were used in the authentication of official documents, especially on those sent out from the central administration to the provinces. They were usually made from carved blocks of ivory. In 1635 a law was passed, regulating the use of each seal for a specific purpose or on specific documents. For example, one was used for the interior administration, one for foreign affairs, one for military affairs and one for dynastic affairs. The king entrusted a seal to an individual minister, with a "Master of the Seal", whose role it was to write and seal all documents on his behalf.

The importance of the seals were attested when another law provided a punishment for the forgery and altering of sealed documents. Simon de la Loubère remarked that the king's own authority was linked to that of his seal. In times of turmoil and dynastic conflict, exceptional importance was attached to the seals, as it was considered that the kingdom's power and authority laid with their custodian. These seals did not survive the sacking and destruction of the city by a Burmese army in 1767.

The use of royal seals continued in the first four reigns of the Rattanakosin Kingdom (founded in 1782). The Chakri kings would use a personal seal for private letters and four official seals for government business. The four great royal seals (พระราชลัญจกร, Phra Ratcha Lanchakon) included: the Maha Ongkan (มหาโองการ), the Khrut Pha (ครุฑพ่าห์), the Hongsaphiman (หงสพิมาน) and the Airaphot (ไอราพต) seals. The seals represented four gods: Shiva (known in Thailand as Phra Isuan), Vishnu (Phra Narai), Brahma (Phra Phrom) and Indra (Phra In). The first three belong strictly to the Hindu Trimurti (or Trinity) and the last is a popular king of the gods in Buddhism.

The four seals are now kept by the Secretariat of the Cabinet and are affixed to documents by its officers in different combinations, depending on the purpose of those documents.

=== Four great royal seals ===

Phra Ratcha Lanchakon Maha Ongkan
Royal Seal of the Great Decree
An Unalom symbol inside a royal Busabok pavilion, flanked by two seven-tiered royal umbrellas. The seal represents Shiva.
Phra Ratcha Lanchakon Airaphot
Royal Seal of Airavata elephant
A royal pavilion mounted on the back of Airavata (a mythical three-headed elephant), flanked by two five-tiered royal umbrellas. The Airavata according to myth is the vehicle of Indra.

Phra Ratcha Lanchakon Phra Khrut Pha
Royal Seal of Garuda the Carrier
Narayana mounted on the back of Garuda. Within the Garuda's claws are two Nāga serpents. Narayana was an incarnation of Vishnu.
Phra Ratcha Lanchakon Hongsaphiman
Royal Seal of the Swan Pavilion
A royal pavilion mounted on the back of hamsa (a mythical swan), at its feet are lotus flowers and leaves. The hamsa according to myth is the vehicle of Brahma.

== Garuda emblem ==
=== Royal symbol ===
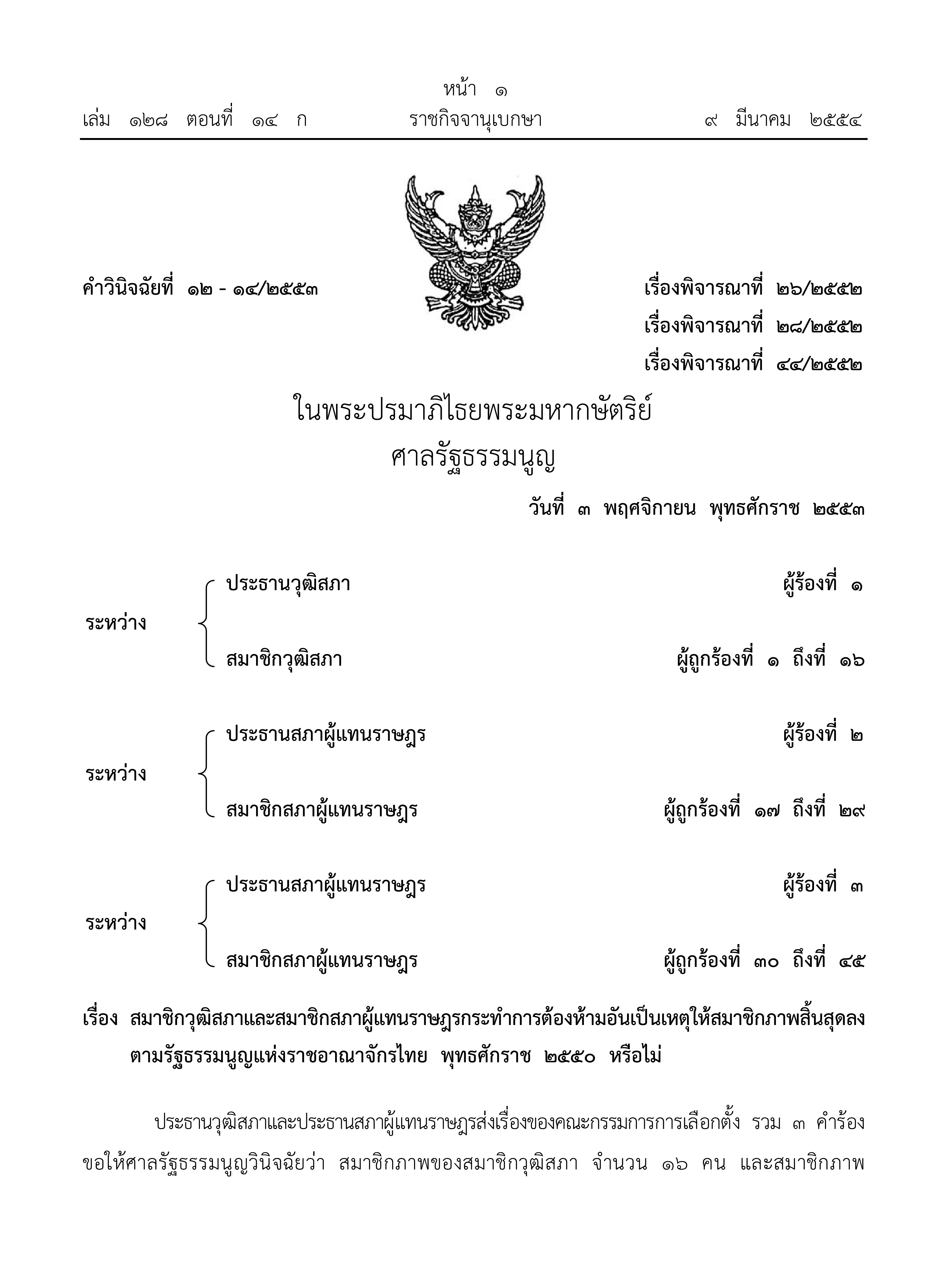
Constitutional Court Decision No. 12-14/2553 dated 3 November 2010, as published in the Government Gazette. The Garuda emblem is used on the letterhead, as is common on all Thai government documents.

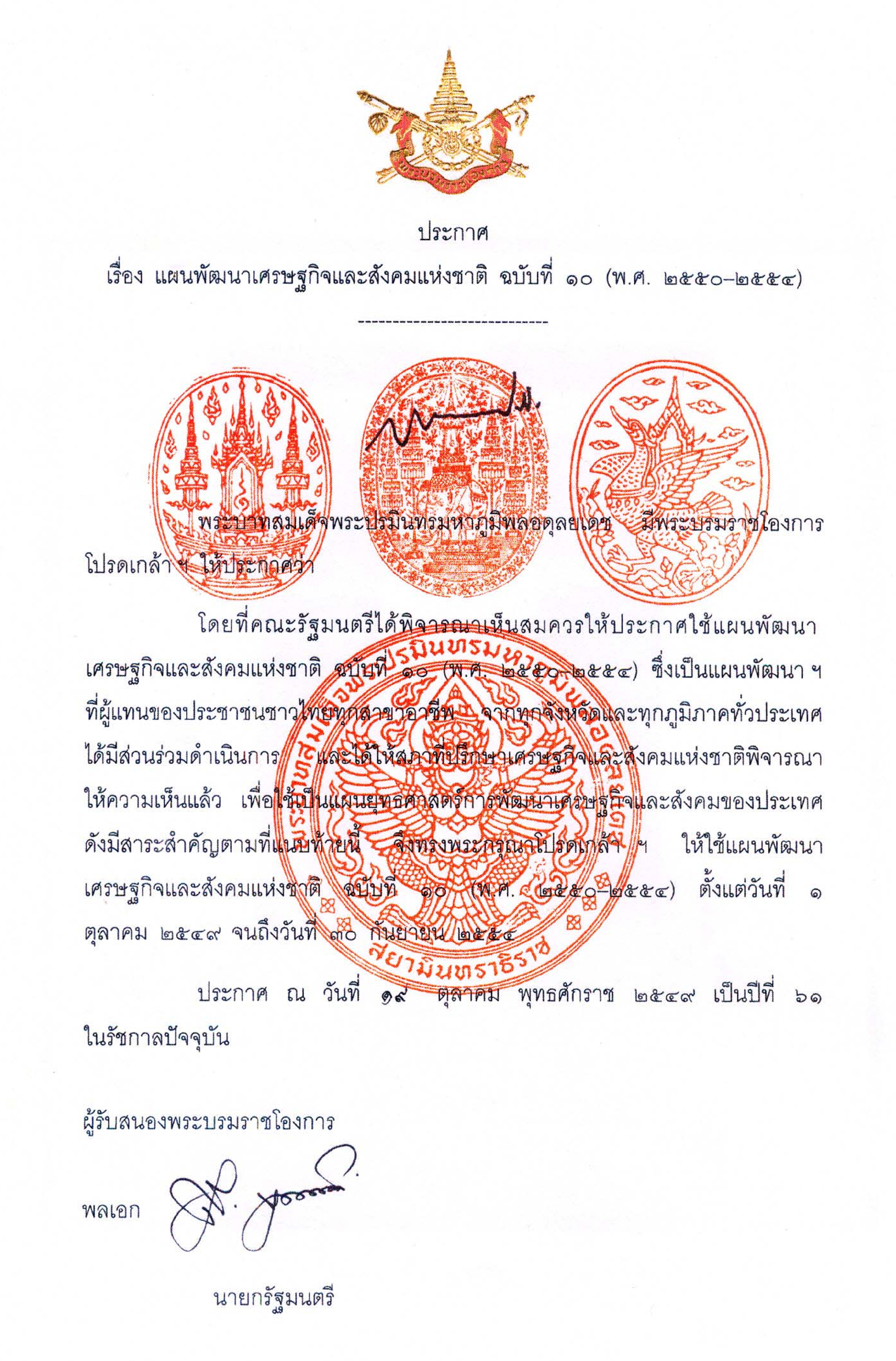
A proclamation dated 19 October 2006. King Bhumibol Adulyadej signed at the top of the paper and prime minister Surayud Chulanont countersigned at the bottom. All of the four seals were used on this modern document.

Thai kings recruited Brahmins from India and adopted Hindu court rituals. The national and royal symbol of Thailand is Garuda, the mount of Lord Vishnu. Thailand uses the Garuda (Thai: ครุฑ, khrut) as its national symbol, known as the Phra Khrut Pha, meaning "Garuda, the vehicle (of Vishnu)," also used as the symbol of royalty. It adorns the banknote of thai currency - the Baht - as well.

These seals were used until 1873, when a European inspired coat of arms was designated by King Chulalongkorn (Rama V) as the national emblem of Siam. However, the creation of the coat of arms did not entirely replace the old royal seals, for a law promulgated in 1890, stated that the Khrut Pha and the Airaphot seals would continue to be used. In 1893 the King changed his mind and decided that the heraldic arms was too foreign, and ordered his brother the Prince Narisara Nuvadtivongs to design a new seal featuring the Garuda. The Garuda as a symbol has been depicted in royal seals since the times of Ayutthaya. The Prince drew a new seal, which was based on the old design, featuring the god Narayana mounted on the Garuda's back. This version of the seal was used only briefly, as the King was not satisfied with this rendition. Soon after he asked the Prince to redesign the seal depicting the Garuda alone.

The royal standard of Thailand or Thong Maha Rat (ธงมหาราช). The Garuda also features in standards of other members of the royal family.

In 1910, King Vajiravudh (Rama VI) decided to abandon the coat of arms altogether and use the Garuda as his primary device. The King asked Phra Dhevabhinimit (a famous artist at the time) to design a new seal, using Prince Naris' drawing of the Garuda, but with an addition of an encirclement of the King's ceremonial name on the outer edge. In 1911 an Act on the Seals of State was passed establishing the Garuda seal as the principal seal "To be impressed for authentication of the King's signature on all important deeds and documents." From then on the Garuda seal named Phra Khrut Pha became the country's official emblem. King Prajadhipok (Rama VII) continued the use of the seal by replacing his predecessor's name with his own. As King Ananda Mahidol (Rama VIII) was never crowned in a coronation ceremony (and therefore was never bestowed with a regnal name), a seal for his reign was never carved, instead he used his grandfather's (those of King Rama V's) instead. The seal made for King Bhumibol Adulyadej (Rama IX) was carved in 1946, soon after his coronation.

The Garuda also became the official symbol of the Thai monarchy. In 1910 King Rama VI passed an Act on Flags, which created a new set of the royal standards, in which the Garuda took a prominent place. The standard would fly above various royal residences, signifying the king's presence there. The standard would also fly in front of the king's royal vehicles. In 1996 a royal barge called Narai Song Suban (เรือพระที่นั่งนารายณ์ทรงสุบรรณ; Narayana on his carrier) was launched, the bow of the barge depicts Narayana mounted on the back of a Garuda.

Drawn by Prince Naris in 1893. The seal depicts the Garuda, with wings outstretched, with Narayana mounted on his back. This version was only used briefly.

The final version depicts the Garuda alone, with wings outstretched. This version was used by King Chulalongkorn.

King Vajiravudh introduced the encircling of the king's ceremonial name around the Garuda. This example is the seal used by King Bhumibol Adulyadej (Rama IX) which was carved for his coronation in 1950.

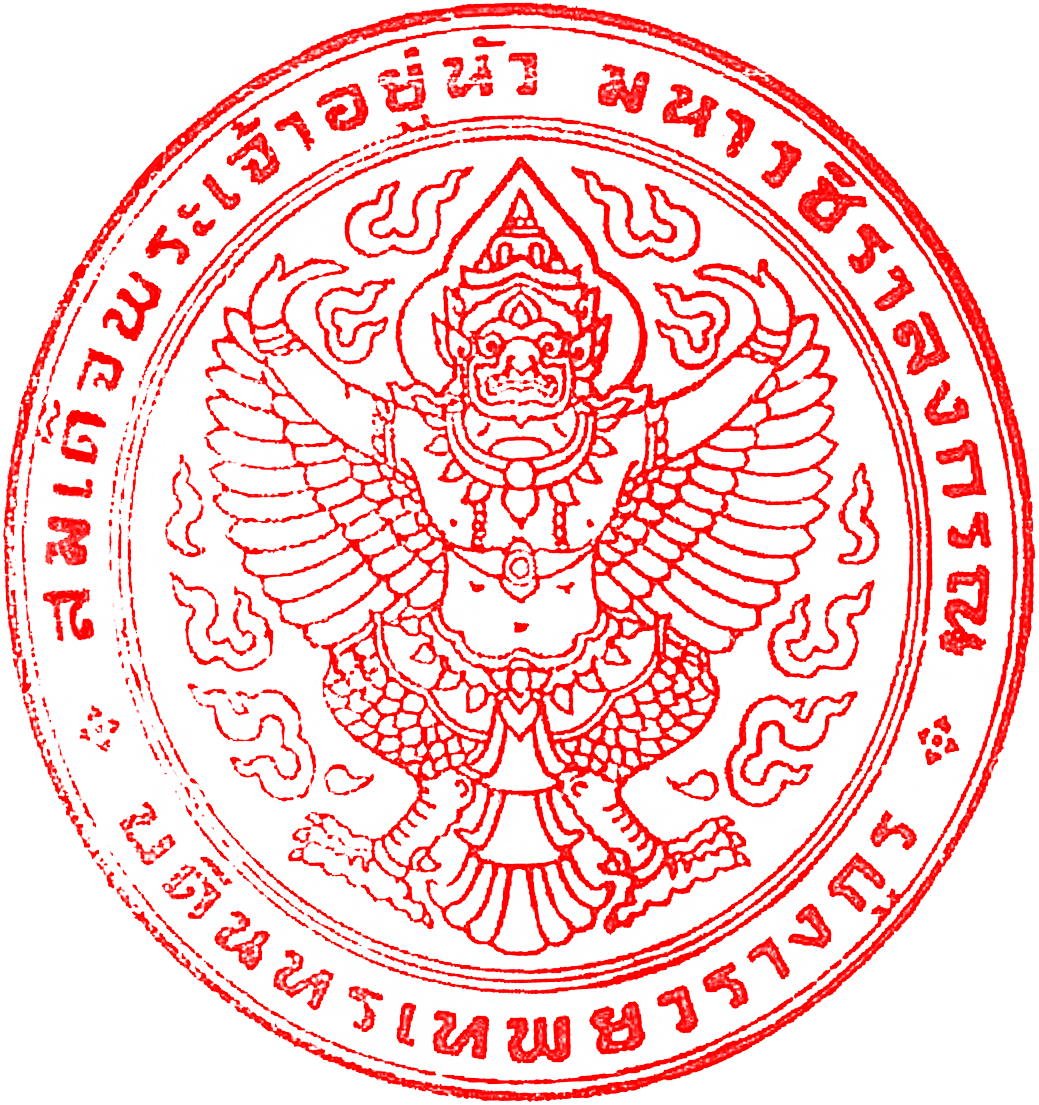

Seal of King Vajiralongkorn, encircled with the king's official name before his coronation: "สมเด็จพระเจ้าอยู่หัวมหาวชิราลงกรณ บดินทรเทพยวรางกูร" ("Somdet Phra Chao Yu Hua Maha Vajiralongkorn Bodindradebayavarangkun.")

=== Official emblem ===
The Garuda was also adopted by the Royal Thai Government as its official emblem. The Garuda emblem appears on the letterhead of almost all Thai government documents. The position of the king as the earthly personification of Narayana is symbolised through the use of the Garuda. This symbolism also illustrates the belief that the government (as represented by the Garuda) is the vehicle (or instrument) of the king. The figure of the Garuda is also used as symbol of state property, and as such is displayed on government buildings, title deeds, boundary markers and in the uniforms of the Royal Thai Police and Royal Thai Armed Forces.

King Rama VI was the first to regulate the use of the Garuda emblem by the government through legislation in 1911. The use of the Garuda emblem was further regulated in an Act on the Garuda Emblem in 1991. A penalty for the misuse and misrepresentation of the Garuda was set to; imprisonment of no longer than one year, or a fine of between three and six thousand Baht, or both. In 2001 the Office of the Prime Minister issued a guideline outlining the use of the emblem. The document recommended that the Garuda should be treated with respect as it is considered a sacred symbol.

At first there was no fixed rule as to what posture the Garuda should be depicted. King Rama VI eventually selected an attitude for the Garuda called Khrut Ram (ครุฑรํา) or 'dancing Garuda' (wings displayed and elevated). However no law ever prescribed a specific design for use, as a result several designs are in use by various government departments.

=== Government use ===

Strictly for use by the monarch. Also used on the cover of the Royal Thai Government Gazette and Thai passports.

Used on general documents, such as land deeds and letters (most common).

Used on general documents, such as court orders.

Used on general documents and on Thai banknotes.

=== Royal warrant ===
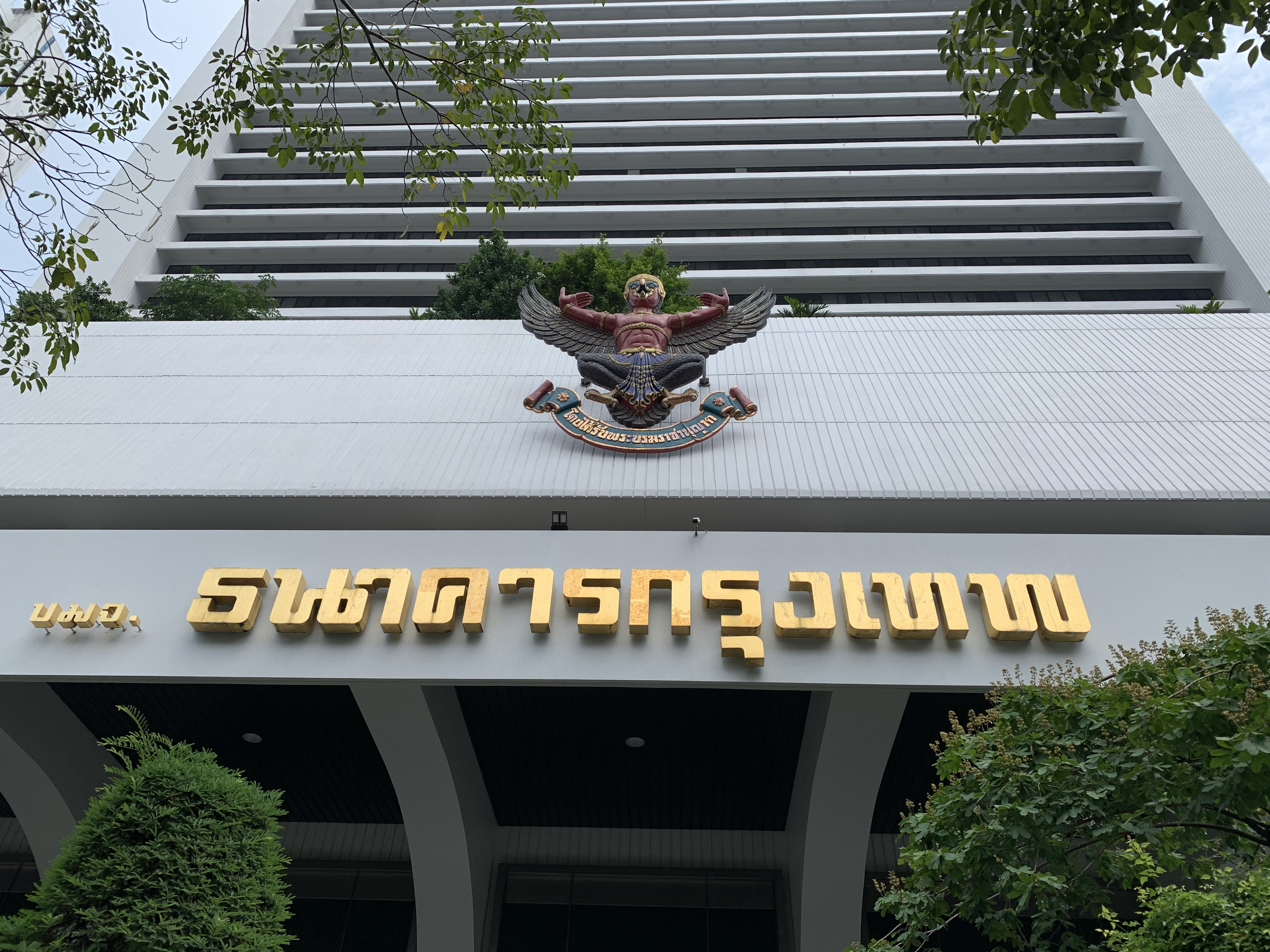
Garuda statue granted by royal appointment at the head office of Bangkok Bank in Bangkok

Private entities such as businesses may be granted permission to use and display the Garuda emblem. Deserving firms, such those of good standing, could apply for a Royal warrant of appointment from the king through the Bureau of the Royal Household or the Prime Minister. Once permission is given the firm is then allowed to display a Tra Tang Hang (ตราตั้งห้าง) or store standing emblem, which is a large sculpture of the Garuda, on all of their business premises. Receiving a Royal warrant is considered a great honour and a mark of distinction for any Thai company.

The Garuda sculpture depicts the beast adorned with a golden crown and regalia, wearing a robe of blue and green, with wings outstreched. Underneath the figure is a ribbon with the phrase "By Appointment to His Majesty the King" (โดยได้รับพระบรมราชานุญาต). Previously a sculpture of the royal arms was displayed during the reign of King Rama V, these were replaced with the Garuda in 1911.

== Historical emblems ==
=== Coat of arms of Siam ===
Royal coat of arms of Siam; พระราชลัญจกรประจำแผ่นดินสยาม

Versions
- Armiger: Chulalongkorn (Rama V)
- Adopted: Created in 1873, most use discontinued in 1910.
- Crest: The Great Crown of Victory with a rays of light emitting from the top and the Emblem of the Chakri dynasty (Chakra and Trishula)
- Torse: Pink ribbons
- Shield: The first (chief) quadrant depicts an Airavata on a yellow field. This quadrant represents the Thai heartland, the three heads of the elephant represents its northern, central and southern regions. The lower left quadrant (dexter base) depicts a white elephant on a red field. This quadrant represents the Laotian suzerainty. The lower right quadrant (sinister base) depicts two-crossed krises (one with and one without a scabbard) on a pink field, this represents the Malay suzerainty in the south
- Supporters: Gajasiha and Rajasiha holding the Seven-Tiered Chatras
- Compartment: Pedestal
- Motto: Pali (in Thai script) : สพฺเพสํ สงฺฆภูตานํ สามคฺคี วุฑฺฒิ สาธิกา (Sabbesaṃ saṅghabhūtānaṃ sāmaggī vuḍḍhi sādhikā)
- Order(s): Order of the Nine Gems and Order of Chula Chom Klao
- Other elements: Mantle and the Royal regalia (Sword of Victory, Royal Staff, Royal Slippers, fan and fly-whisk)
- Use: Used by the king and the government of Siam on all official documents.

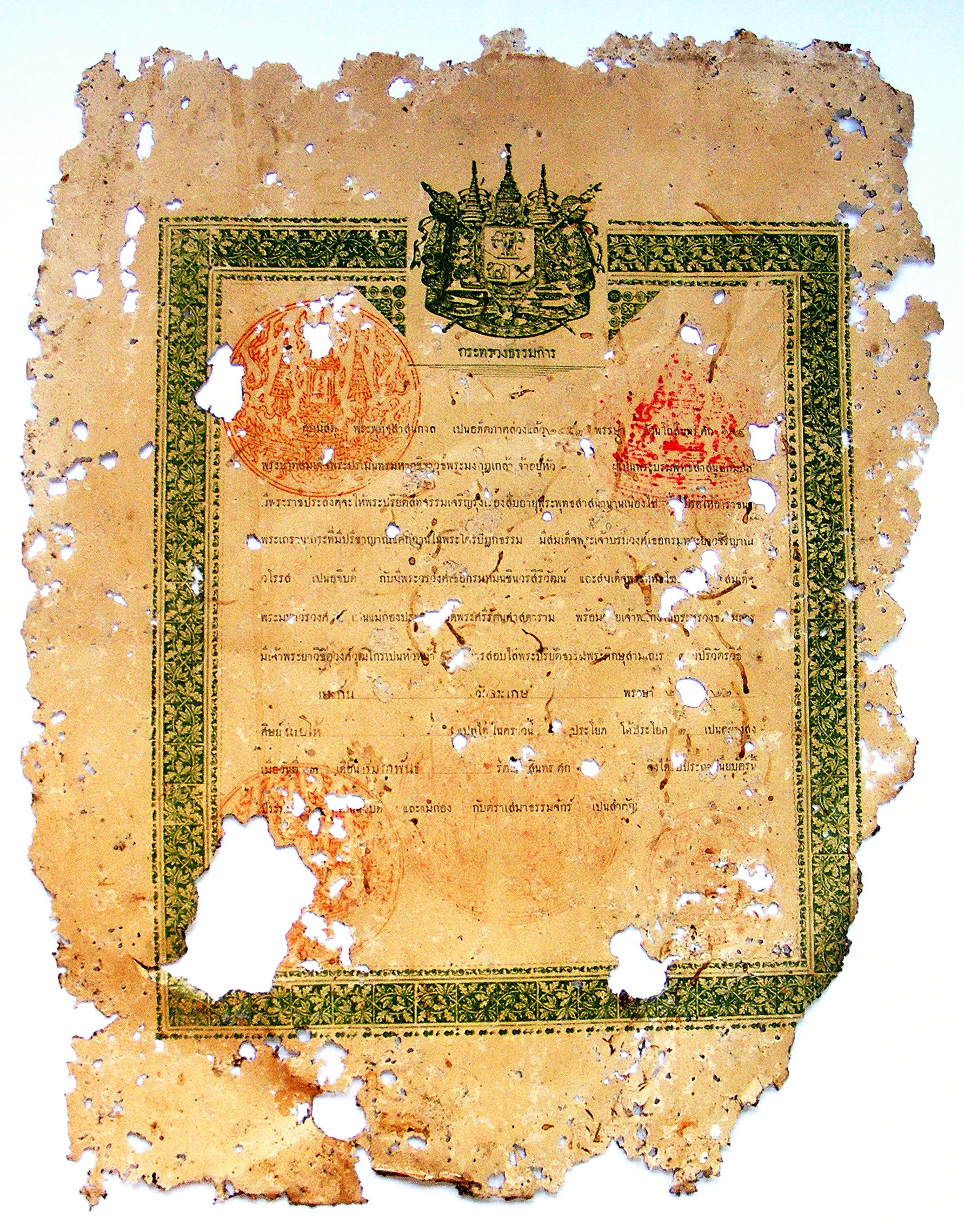
A Buddhist Theological degree from 1910, from Uttaradit Province. The coat of arms of Siam is used on the letterhead.

From 1873 to 1910, a heraldic style coat of arms (ตราอาร์ม, Tra Arms) became the national emblem of Siam (renamed Thailand in 1939). The Western-style coat of arms was created at the command of King Rama V. The king ordered his cousin Prince Pravij Jumsai to design the arms for him. The armorial emblem contains almost all the elements of a European coat of arms; however, all the components of the emblem are traditional Thai royal symbols. The emblem is called the Phra Ratcha Lanchakon Pracham Phaen Din Sayam (พระราชลัญจกรประจำแผ่นดินสยาม).

The escutcheon or shield, is divided into three quadrants. The first (chief) quadrant depicts an Airavata on a yellow field. This quadrant represents the Thai heartland, the three heads of the elephant represents its northern, central and southern regions. The lower left quadrant (dexter base) depicts a white elephant on a red field. This quadrant represents the Laotian suzerainty (the symbol comes for its native name Lan Xang, land of a million elephants). The lower right quadrant (sinister base) depicts two-crossed krises (one with and one without a scabbard) on a pink field, this represents the Malay (Perlis, Kedah, Kelantan and Terengganu) suzerainty in the south.

Above the shield is the symbol representing the Chakri dynasty, a disc and a trident (Chakra and the Trisula). The shield is then surrounded by the chain of the Order of the Nine Gems (representing Buddhism) with a chain and pendant from the Order of Chula Chom Klao (featuring a portrait of King Rama V).

The arms contains all the six Royal regalia of Thailand. The shield is crowned by the Great Crown of Victory, with a rays of light emitting from the top. Besides the shield are two seven-tiered Royal umbrellas of state. Crossed behind the shield is the Sword of Victory to the left and the Royal staff to the right. In front of them are the Royal fan and flywhisk (to the right and left, respectively). And finally on the compartment, a golden multi-layered royal seat, are the Royal slippers.

The motto is in the Pali language written in Thai script: "สพฺเพสํ สงฺฆภูตานํ สามคฺคี วุฑฺฒิ สาธิกา" (Sabbesaṃ saṅghabhūtānaṃ sāmaggī vuḍḍhi sādhikā) meaning "The unity of a people come together as a party shall be a guarantor of prosperity". This motto was composed by Ariyavangsagatayana (Sa Pussadeva), the Buddhist Supreme Patriarch at the time. The supporters of the arms are two mythical creatures. To the left of the shield (dexter) is an elephant lion (a lion with a trunk) or a Gajasiha (คชสีห์). To the right of the shield (sinister) is the king of the lions, the Rajasiha (ราชสีห์). The two supporters represents the two ancient departments of Kalahom (Gajasiha) and Mahatthai (Rajasiha). Kalahom was the department of the Military and the south, while Mahatthai was department of the civil service and the north. The mantle around the arms is the cloak of the Order of Chula Chom Klao, tied with pink ribbons (pink being the colour of Tuesday, the day of King Rama V's birth).

The coat of arms was restored in the time of the Luang Phibunsongkhram and Sarit Thanarat military regimes (1948–1963) for use by the army and the police. It featured also on coins struck from 1950 to 1957. At present, the coat of arms is still used as the cap-badge of the Royal Thai Police and is the official symbol of the Chulachomklao Royal Military Academy. The Courts of Justice and the Supreme Court of Justice also uses the arms as its official seal.

Printed on the cover of the Royal Gazette. During the reign of King Rama V.

The coat of arms as a royal seal, encircled with the king's ceremonial name Somdet Phra Paramindra Maha Chulalongkorn Bodindradebyamahamakut Phra Chulachomklao Chao Krung Sayam. The seal was used for only one reign.

The coat of arms used as a Royal warrant of appointment, eventually replaced by the Garuda.

The coat of arms of the 1st Infantry Regiment, King's Close Bodyguard, Royal Thai Army. The regiment was founded by King Rama V in 1859.

Coat of Arms (cap badge) of the Royal Thai Police.

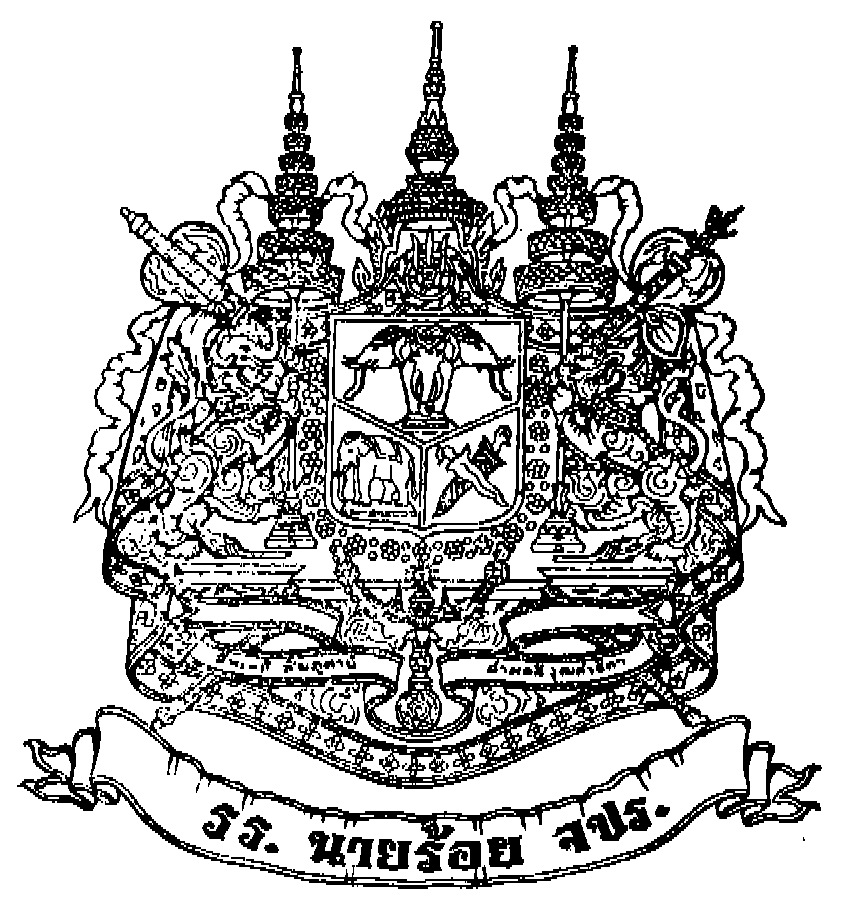
Coat of Arms of Chulachomklao Royal Military Academy.

Seal of Bangkok South Civil Court.

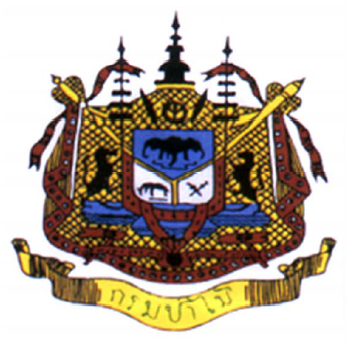
Coat of Arms of Siam as an emblem of the Royal Forest Department of Thailand

=== Emblem of the Chakri dynasty ===
In 1782, King Phutthayotfa Chulalok (Rama I) established the Chakri dynasty with a new capital city at Bangkok. A symbol representing the new dynasty was created, featuring two intertwined weapons, the Chakra (a throwing disc) and the Trisula (a trident). The weapons are derived from an official title; Chao Phraya Chakri, that King Rama I held from 1770 to 1778. The title was usually given to the kingdom's greatest warlord. The word Chakri (จักรี) in Sanskrit means: 'The Wielder of the Discus'. The Chakra and Trisula according to tradition are the divine weapons of the gods Vishnu (or Narayana) and Shiva, respectively.

Chakri emblem, the symbol of the Chakri dynasty, founded in 1782 by King Rama I.

Intertwined divine weapons, the Chakra and the Trisula.

The Royal Command emblem incorporates the Chakri symbol, from the Royal gazette (before 1940).

The Royal Command emblem
(1940–present).

== See also ==
- National symbols of Thailand
- Seals of the provinces of Thailand
- Thai art
- Royal Nine-Tiered Umbrella
- National emblem of Indonesia — also features Garuda as blazon
