= Royal Gazette (Thailand) =

Official government journal

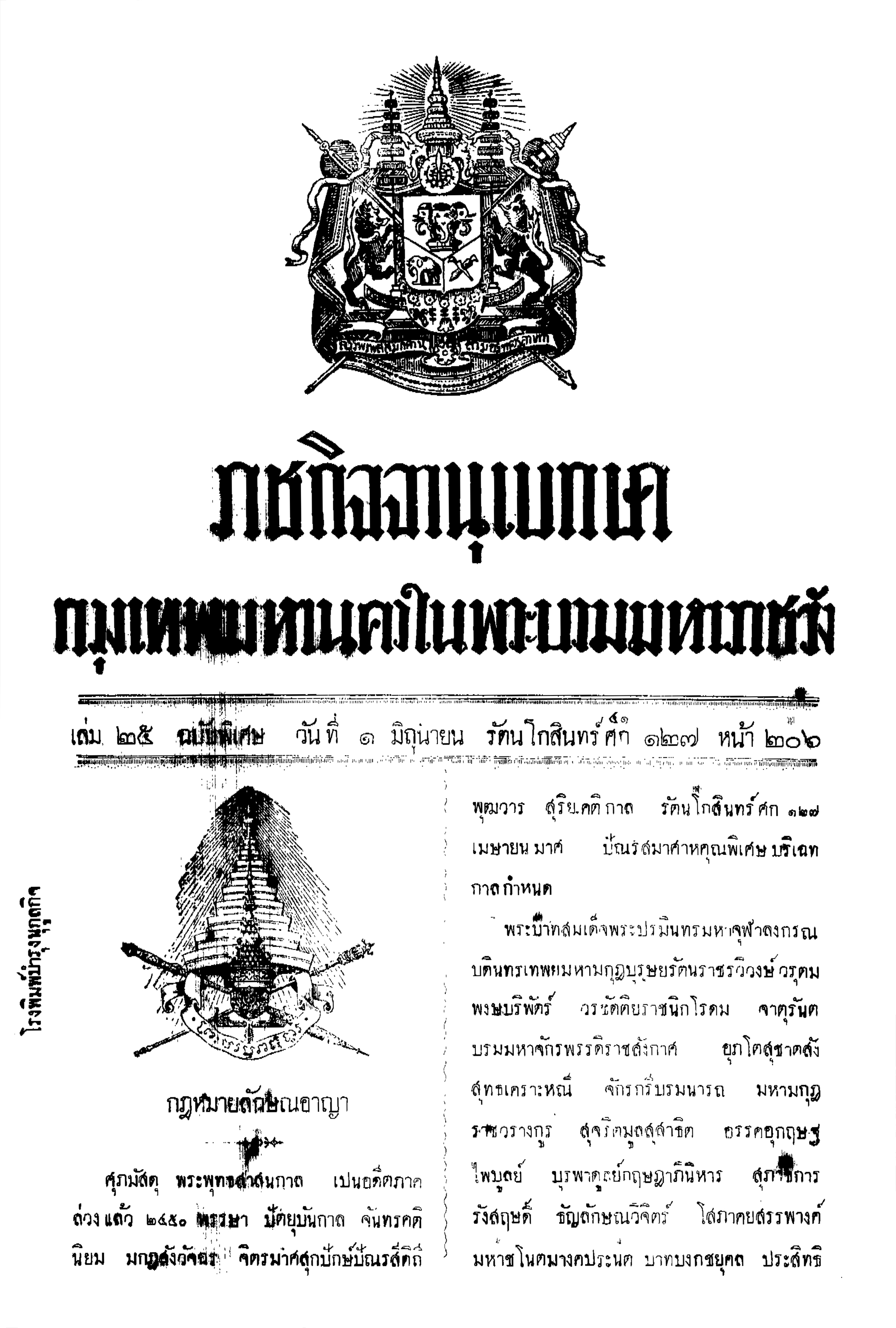
- The Royal Gazette dated 1 June 1908, in which the Siamese Penal Code, the first modern legal code of the country, was published.
- Type: Government gazette
- Format: Print and electronic
- Owner: Government of Thailand
- Founder: Mongkut
- Publisher: Secretariat of the Cabinet
- Founded: 15 March 1858; 168 years ago
- Language: Thai
- City: Bangkok
- Country: Thailand
- Website: ratchakitcha.soc.go.th

The Royal Gazette (Thai: ราชกิจจานุเบกษา; RTGS: Ratchakitchanubeksa) is the official journal of Thailand (formerly Siam).

The gazette was first published in 1858 at the behest of King Mongkut (Rama IV) as a channel for his government to communicate its information to the public, especially in regard to the issuance of laws. Laws enacted by the Thai government are required to be published in this gazette in order to take effect.

The gazette is the first locally produced journal of Thailand, the first journal of the Thai government, and the oldest Thai journal still in publication.

As of 2023, the gazette is only published online and is available in print format in limited copies only for archival purposes.

== Name ==
The Thai name of the gazette, Ratchakitchanubeksa, was coined by King Mongkut and means "for looking into royal works".

== History ==
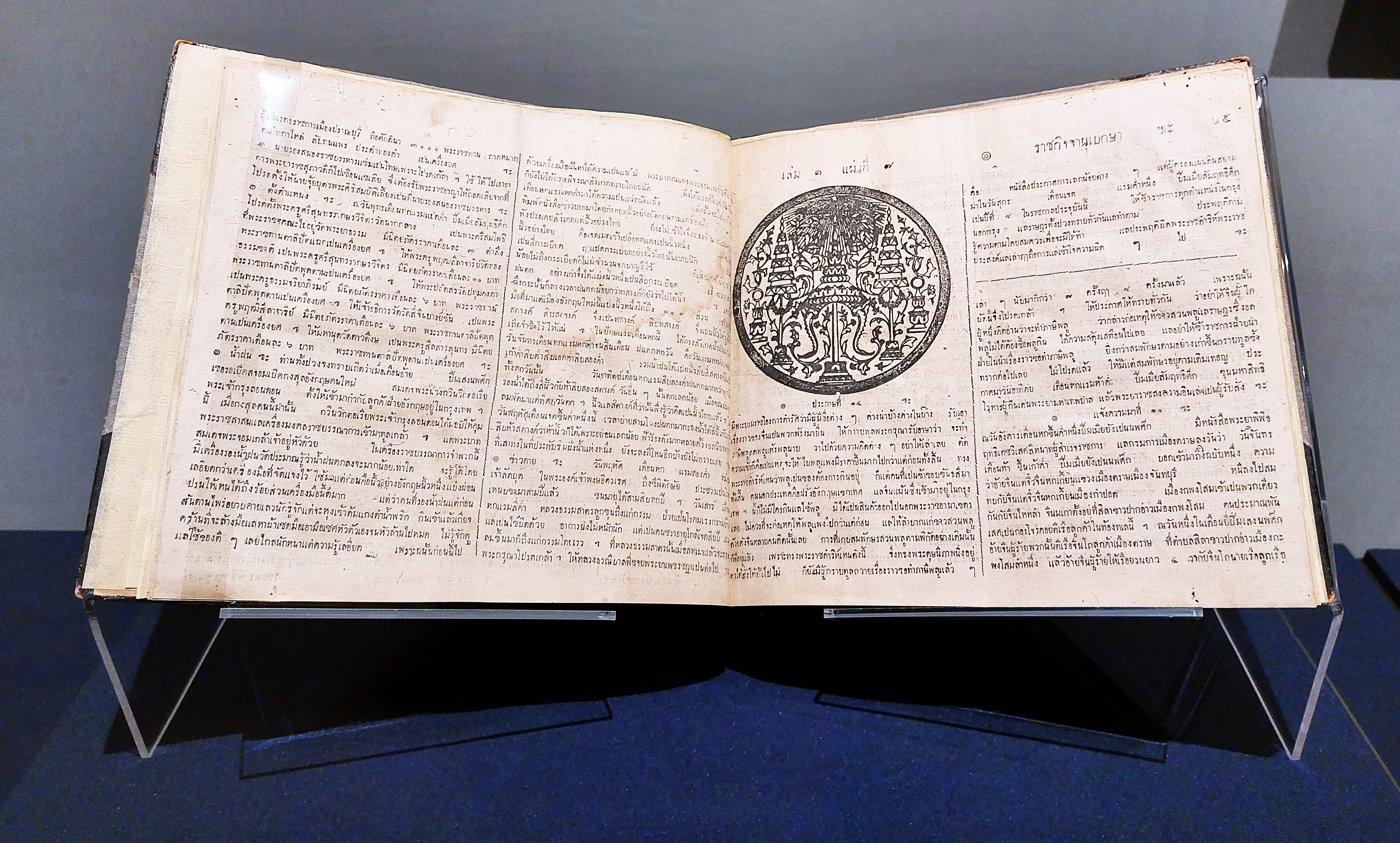
The Royal Gazette from the reign of King Mongkut, displayed at the Bangkok National Museum.

The gazette was first issued by an announcement of King Mongkut dated 15 March 1858. According to the announcement, this gazette was intended to convey information from the government to the public, in order to prevent incorrect rumours which might affect the "governmental affairs" and the "dignity of the Country". Some scholars, including Manit Suksomjit, believe that the initiation of the gazette was driven by the information previously published by American missionary Dan Beach Bradley in the Bangkok Recorder and considered "inaccurate" by King Mongkut.

King Mongkut himself served as the producer and editor-in-chief of the gazette. The king also had a printing office erected near his residential hall Phanumat Chamrun (Thai: ภาณุมาศจำรูญ) within the Grand Palace, Bangkok, particularly for printing this gazette. The office was under an independent department, called Akson Phimphakan (Thai: อักษรพิมพการ), to which the king directly appointed a director general. At that time, the gazette was issued every 15 days and was free of charge. The gazette was discontinued after having been in publication for merely around one year.

Later, King Chulalongkorn (Rama V) revived the gazette on 17 May 1874. This time, the gazette was published once every week and was sold at 8 baht per year, as the king deemed that free distribution resulted in the gazette being underrated. The fees collected were forwarded to the royal treasury. However, Akson Phimphakan revealed that only few people were willing to spend their money on the gazette, stating that, of over 500 copies published, only 50–60 were taken, and this caused it to feel like "wasting its efforts producing [the gazette]". The gazette was again discontinued after five years in publication. The last issue was dated 7 March 1880.

King Chulalongkorn again revived the gazette on 8 September 1881 and had it published every Sunday. The king also turned the independent department Akson Phimphakan into a subsidiary of the Royal Scribal Department. But due to excessive workload of its staff, the gazette was again discontinued after having been published for a while, and the king again revived it on 28 December 1884, announcing that, this time, he intended to "allow no interruption as before". After a series of publicity to solicit readers, the gazette gained a greater number of subscribers that, in 1893, it publicly expressed its gratitude to its subscribers, saying they were "source of its delight". Also in 1893, King Chulalongkorn established a cabinet ministry called Murathathon and had the Royal Scribal Department affiliated to it. The work of publishing this gazette thus became under the responsibility of Murathathon. But instead of printing the gazette itself as before, the government employed private printers, including Bamrung Nukulkij, to print the gazette. Occasionally, private printers printed the gazette for the government without charge.

After the Siamese revolution of 1932, the scribal works of the Murathathon ministry were transferred to the Secretariat of the Cabinet (SOC) newly established in the Office of the Prime Minister. The work of publishing this gazette has since been under the responsibility of the SOC, in which a specific section, called the Royal Gazette Subdivision (Thai: กลุ่มงานราชกิจจานุเบกษา), has been set up to take charge of the work, and a printer, called the Cabinet and Royal Gazette Publishing Office (Thai: สำนักพิมพ์คณะรัฐมนตรีและราชกิจจานุเบกษา), has been created for printing the physical version of the gazette. The gazette was initially published once a week, but now the publication has no fixed schedule and depends on the urgency of each work. As of 2023, the gazette is only published online and each issue is only available in four physical copies, one to be archived at the SOC, the others at the National Library of Thailand in Bangkok.

== Series ==
At present, the gazette consists of four series:

- Series A, called Legislation, contains legislation and judicial decisions.
- Series B, called Title Registers, contains notifications about holders of royal, noble, and ecclesiastical titles, such as royal schedules, conferral or recall of decorations, and news from the royal court.
- Series C, called Trade Registers, contains notifications about commercial organisations, as companies and partnerships.
- Series D, called Announcements and Works in General, contains works other than those belonging to the previous three series.

It is a legal requirement that laws enacted by the Thai government be published in this gazette prior to coming into force. The first formal constitution of Thailand, the Constitution of the Kingdom of Siam 1932, stated in section 38 that bills passed by the House of Representatives and signed by the monarch took effect upon publication in the gazette.

== Archives ==
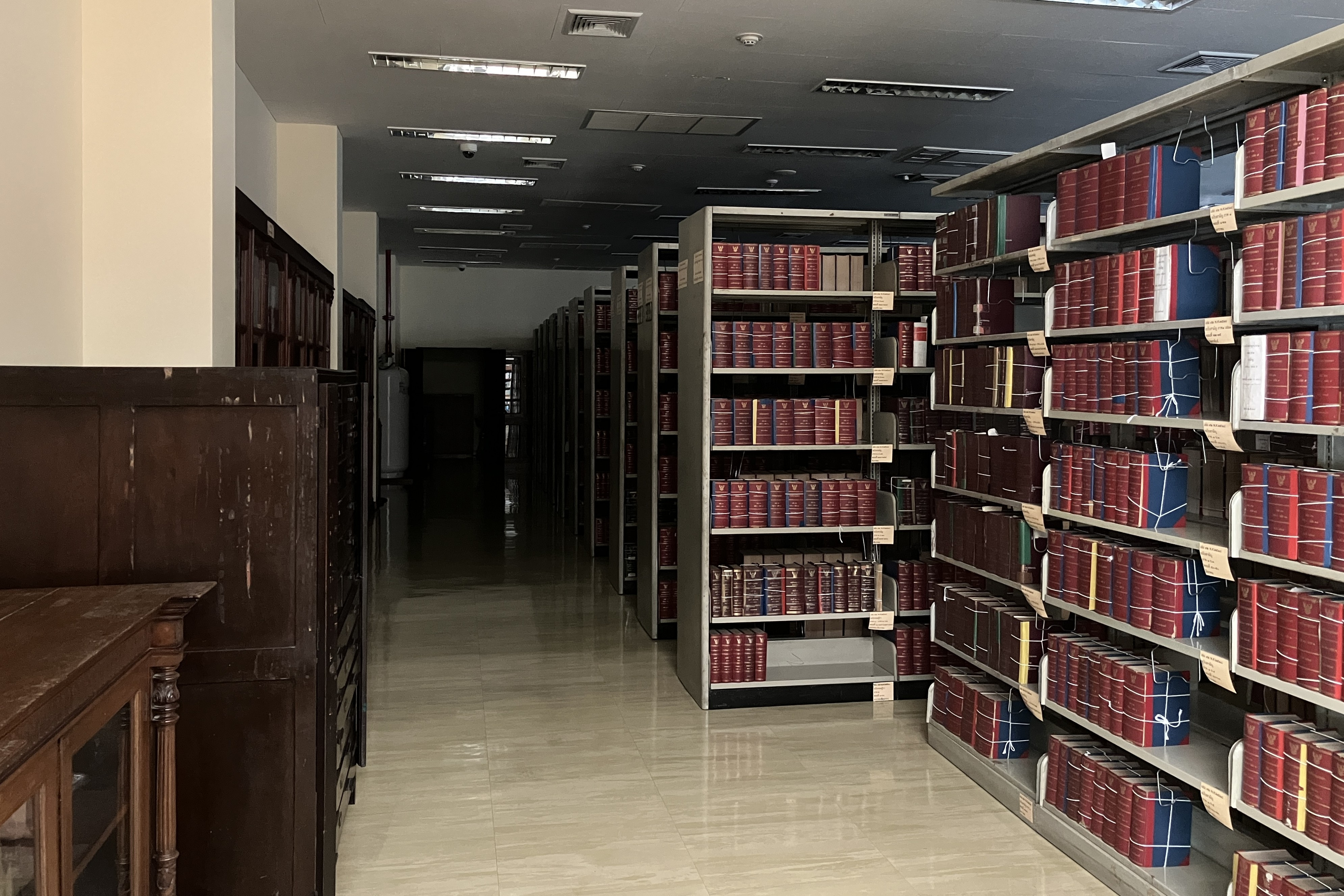
The Royal Government Gazette collection at the National Library

Of all the hundreds of copies printed between 1858 and 1859 in the reign of King Mongkut, only 19 copies have survived to date.

As regards the edition revived by King Chulalongkorn between 1874 and 1880, most of the surviving copies are incomplete and they have been reprinted twice, in 1997 and 2003 respectively. As for the edition revived in 1881, only a single volume has survived, with some pages missing. It has been reprinted once, in 1970.

Physical original copies of the gazette since the reign of King Mongkut are archived at the National Library of Thailand, Bangkok, and are available for the public, but prior contact with the library is required.
