= Secretariat of the Cabinet (Thailand) =

Government department of Thailand

- สำนักเลขาธิการคณะรัฐมนตรี Samnak Lekha-thikan Khana Ratthamontri
- Official seal

Agency overview
- Formed: September 14, 1932; 93 years ago
- Preceding agency: Royal Scribes Department (before Siamese revolution of 1932)
- Motto: Thai: รักหน้าที่ มีวินัย ใฝ่พัฒนา
- Agency executive: Natjaree Anuntasilpa, Secretary to the Cabinet
- Parent agency: Office of the Prime Minister
- Website: www.soc.go.th

The Secretariat of the Cabinet (SOC; Thai: สำนักเลขาธิการคณะรัฐมนตรี, RTGS: Samnak Lekhathikan Khana Ratthamontri) is a department-level Thai government agency under the Office of the Prime Minister. It serves as the operating body of the Cabinet, handling all its regular functions and supporting its decision-making, as well as coordinating with the legislative, the royal household, and the machinery of government on all relevant matters. It is also responsible for the publication of laws and important notices through the Royal Thai Government Gazette, as well as such ceremonial matters as the use of royal seals and the granting of royal decorations.

== History ==
In the absolute monarchy era, the king's exercise of authority was supported by the court office known as the Royal Scribes Department, which performed royal secretary functions. During modernizing reforms at the turn of the 19th–20th centuries, the department was reorganized several times, and by the late 1920s, its state-related functions were consolidated under the Royal Secretariat Department (กรมราชเลขาธิการ, Krom Ratchalekhathikan), which was now separate from the king's private secretary.

Following the abolition of absolute monarchy in 1932, a new parliamentary government was set up, with the cabinet known as the People's Committee. The Royal Secretariat Department was abolished, replaced by a secretariat office serving the cabinet, which was established on 14 September 1932. Known as Krom Lekhathikan Khana Kammakan Ratsadon (กรมเลขาธิการคณะกรรมการราษฎร 'secretariat of the People's Committee'), it took over most of the Royal Secretariat's functions.

When the cabinet's title was changed to khana ratthamontri in December 1932, the office was accordingly renamed to Krom Lekhathikan Khana Ratthamontri (กรมเลขาธิการคณะรัฐมนตรี). In 1952, the secretariat was placed under the Office of the Prime Minister, and after several more reorganizations, it arrived at its current title in 1959.

== Functions ==
The SOC's functions are stipulated by the Ministerial Regulation on the Organization of the Secretariat of the Cabinet, Office of the Prime Minister, B.E. 2559 (2016 CE) as follows:

1. Carrying out functions of the Cabinet
2. Coordinating with the secretariats of the House of Representatives and of the Senate on legislative matters
3. Coordinating with the royal agencies on functions of the Prime Minister and of the Cabinet that require royal participation
4. Coordinating with the ministries, departments, and other state agencies to ensure orderly executive governance
5. Serving and disseminating government news and information related to its works to the people
6. Performing any other duties as stipulated by law or assigned by the prime minister or the cabinet

== Organization ==
The SOC is composed of the following bureaus:

1. Bureau of General Administration
2. Division of Cabinet Meeting Logistics
3. Bureau of Legal Affairs
4. Bureau of Information Administration
5. Bureau of Strategic Development and Special Policy Monitoring
6. Bureau of Cabinet Submission Analysis
7. Bureau of Cabinet Affairs
8. Bureau of Royal Scribes and Royal Decorations

There are also several working groups that report directly to its head, the Secretary-General to the Cabinet.

The Bureau of Royal Scribes and Royal Decorations continues to handle most of the ceremonial functions of the historical Royal Scribes Department, including matters related to royal decorations, and the publication and archival of the Royal Thai Government Gazette, which is printed by the Cabinet and Royal Gazette Publishing Office, a semi-autonomous service delivery unit under the SOC. The bureau is also responsible for the safekeeping of the royal seals and their proper affixation to royal decrees and laws, and the creation of hand-written folding-book manuscript copies of each new constitution.
