= Phraya Sisunthonwohan =

Thai writer and scholar

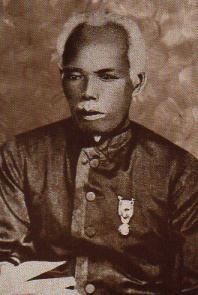
Phraya Sisunthonwohan

Noi Acharayangkun (Thai: น้อย อาจารยางกูร, 5 July 1822 – 16 October 1891), known by the noble title Phraya Sisunthonwohan (พระยาศรีสุนทรโวหาร), (Note: Other spellings include Si Sunthon Wohan, Srisundara Vohara, Srisunthornwohan; Acharyankura, and Achan Yangkun, among others.) was a Thai writer and scholar. He is best known for writing the first modern textbooks on the Thai language, the Munlabot Banphakit series.

== Life ==
Noi (Note: His birth name was simply Noi. The surname Acharyankura, (nowadays more often spelled Acharayangkun) was granted to his grandson Huan by King Vajiravudh in 1914 following the adoption of surnames in the country.) was born in Chachoengsao in 1822. At the age of thirteen, he ordained as a novice monk at Wat Saket in Bangkok, where he studied language and scripture under several learned monks. He joined the sangha after reaching the age of full ordination of twenty, and remained at the monastery for another eleven years before leaving the monkhood. He then took up a career in the royal court of King Mongkut (Rama IV, r. 1851–1868), receiving the title Khun Prasitaksorasat and later becoming head of the Aksonphimphakan royal press. Under King Chulalongkorn (Rama V, r. 1868–1910), he became the head of the Royal Scribes Department, assuming the titles Khun Saraprasoet and later Phraya Sisunthonwohan, and also served as court poet, producing a large output of poetry. He was known as an expert authority on the Thai language, and wrote several textbooks, the first of which, Munlabot Banphakit, was published in 1871. He became head of the palace school, which Chulalongkorn established to pioneer modern education in the country, and taught the royal children, including Crown Prince Vajirunhis and the future king Vajiravudh. He was named to the Privy Council in 1887, and served until his death in 1891.
