= Vajira Mala Order =

Pendant of the Order

The Vajira Mala Order เครื่องราชอิสริยาภรณ์ตราวชิรมาลา
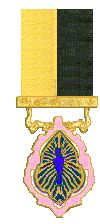
- Pendant of the Order

Awarded by the King of Thailand
- Type: Order of Merit
- Established: 8 May 1911
- Eligibility: Military and Civilian Order
- Awarded for: For services rendered during King Vajiravudh’s reign
- Status: Dormant
- Founder: HM King Vajiravudh (Rama VI)

Statistics
- First induction: 28 May 1911
- Last induction: 15 September 1925
- Total inductees: 100

Precedence
- Next (higher): Order of the Direkgunabhorn
- Ribbon bar of the Vajira Mala Order.

The Vajira Mala Order (Thai: เครื่องราชอิสริยาภรณ์ตราวชิรมาลา) was established on 28 May 1911 (B.E. 2454) by King Rama VI of the Kingdom of Siam (now Thailand) to reward personal service to the sovereign.

Members of the order are entitled to use the postnominals ว.ม.ล.

== Insignia ==
The decoration consists of a single class. The insignia is a pendant, with a blue enamelled figure standing within a golden aura. The aura is framed with a pink enamelled lotus flower outline.
