= Ministry of the Privy Seal =

Historical government ministry of Siam

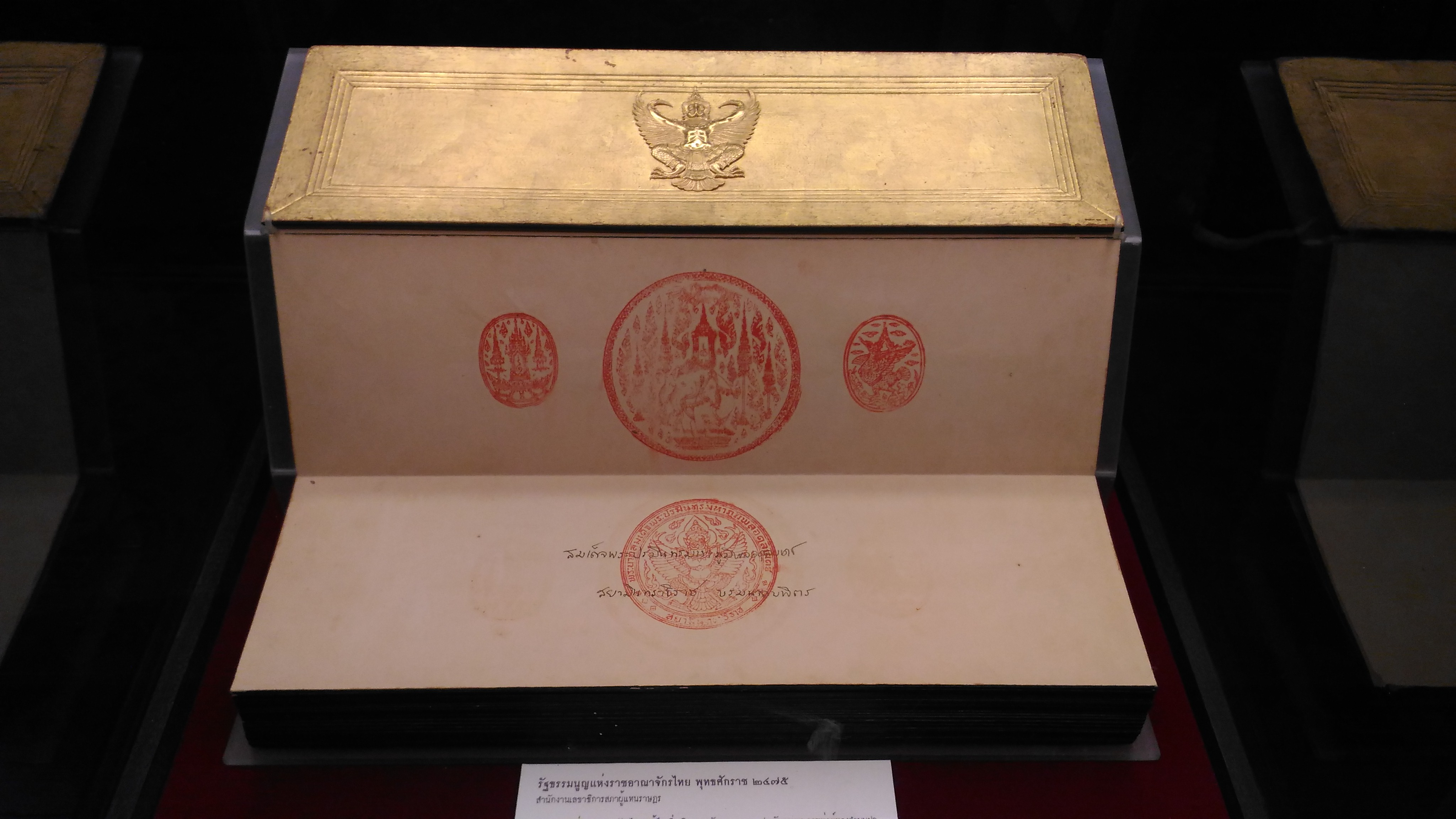
Among the responsibilities of the ministry, as well as its predecessor and successor agencies, was the safekeeping of the royal seals, seen here impressed on a historical manuscript copy of the constitution.

The Ministry of the Privy Seal (Thai: กระทรวงมุรธาธร, RTGS: Krasuang Murathathon) was a government ministry of Siam (Thailand) in existence from 1892 to 1896 and again from 1911 to 1926. Originating from the historical Royal Scribes Department (กรมพระอาลักษณ์, Krom Phra Alak), it was responsible for royal secretarial and document and record-keeping matters.

== History ==
The Royal Scribes Department was an office of the royal court responsible for producing manuscripts of royal decrees, laws, and other documents, and maintaining records thereof. The department probably dates from the time of the later Ayutthaya period (c. 17th century), and was one of the six krom montri—offices directly under the control of the king—in the Chatusadom system.

Royal scribes were important courtiers who were accorded a high level of trust, as they were responsible for relaying the orders of the king. The position required good command of the Thai language, as well as penmanship skills. Some head scribes (who in the Rattanakosin period were usually granted the noble title Sunthonwohan) as such became known as prominent poets (most notably Sunthorn Phu) and language scholars (Noi Acharyankura, Tri Nagapradipa).

By the time of King Chulalongkorn (Rama V), as part of government reforms, the Royal Scribes Department was reorganized into the Ministry of the Privy Seal in 1892, with its work split among three constituent departments: the new Royal Scribes Department, now under the ministry, which oversaw official documents and records; the Council of State Office (กรมรัฐมนตรีสภา) served as an executive body to the Council of State; and the Office (or Department) (Note: King Rama V translated this office's name into English as "Office of His Majesty's Private Secretary" (ออฟฟิศไปรเวตสิเกรตารีหลวง).) of His Majesty's Private Secretary (กรมราชเลขานุการ) which performed the duties of the king's private secretary.

The first instance of the ministry was short-lived, and in 1896, it was subsumed into the Office His Majesty's Private Secretary. Its constituent departments underwent many subsequent reorganizations, with the ministry being revived in 1911 by King Vajiravudh (Rama VI), only to be abolished again in 1926 by his successor, King Prajadhipok (Rama VII).

In 1932, following the Siamese Revolution, the Office of His Majesty's Private Secretary was renamed the Office of His Majesty's Principal Private Secretary, with its status as a public body equivalent to a government department (or directorate general under a ministry). It retained this status until 2017, when the Royal Decree on the Organization of the Administrative and Personnel Affairs of the Royal Household, B.E. 2560 (2017), was issued. The agency was then renamed back to the Office of His Majesty's Private Secretary.

Today, the former ministry's functions are mainly covered by the Secretariat of the Cabinet (SOC). The royal scribes' original calligraphic duties are preserved, now by the Bureau of Royal Scribes and Royal Decorations under the SOC, in the practice of hand-writing folding-book manuscript copies of each new constitution. The bureau is also responsible for the safekeeping of the royal seals and their proper affixation to royal decrees and laws.
