= Pingat Jasa Gemilang (Tentera) =

Pingat Jasa Gemilang (Tentera) (Meritorious Service Medal (Military))
- Medal
- Type: Medal
- Awarded for: Exceptionally distinguished performance or extraordinary service, or the furtherance of links with overseas forces
- Presented by: Singapore
- Eligibility: Members of the Singapore Armed Forces
- Status: Active
- Established: 1981
- Ribbon

Precedence
- Next (higher): Pingat Gagah Perkasa (Tentera)
- Equivalent: Pingat Jasa Gemilang
- Next (lower): Pingat Pentadbiran Awam, Emas (Tentera)

The Pingat Jasa Gemilang (Tentera) (English: Meritorious Service Medal (Military)) is a decoration awarded to members of the Singapore Armed Forces for exceptionally distinguished performance or extraordinary service, or the furtherance of links with overseas forces.

Recipients are entitled to use the post-nominal letters PJG

The Pingat Jasa Gemilang is the civil equivalent award.

== Description ==
- The ribbon white with dark red edges and edge stripes, and a purple-edged white central stripe.

== Recipients ==
=== Singapore ===
- 2003 – Lieutenant General (NS) Lim Chuan Poh – Former Chief of Defence Force
- 2007 – Lieutenant General (NS) Ng Yat Chung – Former Chief of Defence Force
- 2009 – Lieutenant General Desmond Kuek – Chief of Defence Force
- 2012 – Lieutenant General Neo Kian Hong- Chief of Defence Force
- 2015 – Lieutenant General Ng Chee Meng – Chief of Defence Force
- 2018 – Lieutenant General Perry Lim – Chief of Defence Force
- 2021 – Lieutenant General Melvyn Ong – Chief of Defence Force

=== Australia ===
- 1985 – Vice Admiral David Leach – Chief of Naval Staff
- 1997 – Vice Admiral Rodney Taylor – Chief of Navy
- 2003 – Air Chief Marshal Angus Houston – Chief of Defence Force
- 2007 – Lieutenant General Peter Leahy – Chief of Army
- 2007 – Air Marshal Geoff Shepherd – Chief of Air Force
- 2010 – Lieutenant General Ken Gillespie – Chief of Army
- 2010 – Air Marshal Mark Binskin – Vice Chief of the Defence Force
- 2011 – Vice Admiral Russell Crane – Chief of Navy
- 2013 – Lieutenant General David Morrison – Chief of Army
- 2014 – Air Marshal Geoff Brown – Chief of Air Force
- 2014 – Vice Admiral Ray Griggs – Chief of Navy
- 2016 – Vice Admiral Tim Barrett – Chief of Navy
- 2016 – Air Marshal Leo Davies – Chief of Air Force
- 2017 – Lieutenant General Angus Campbell – Chief of Army
- 2021 – Air Marshal Mel Hupfeld – Chief of Air Force
- 2021 – Lieutenant General Rick Burr – Chief of Army
- 2022 – Vice Admiral Michael Noonan – Chief of Navy
- 2024 - Lieutenant General Simon Stuart - Chief of Army
- 2024 – Air Marshal Robert Chipman – Vice Chief of the Defence Force
- 2024 – Vice Admiral Mark Hammond – Chief of Navy

=== Brunei ===
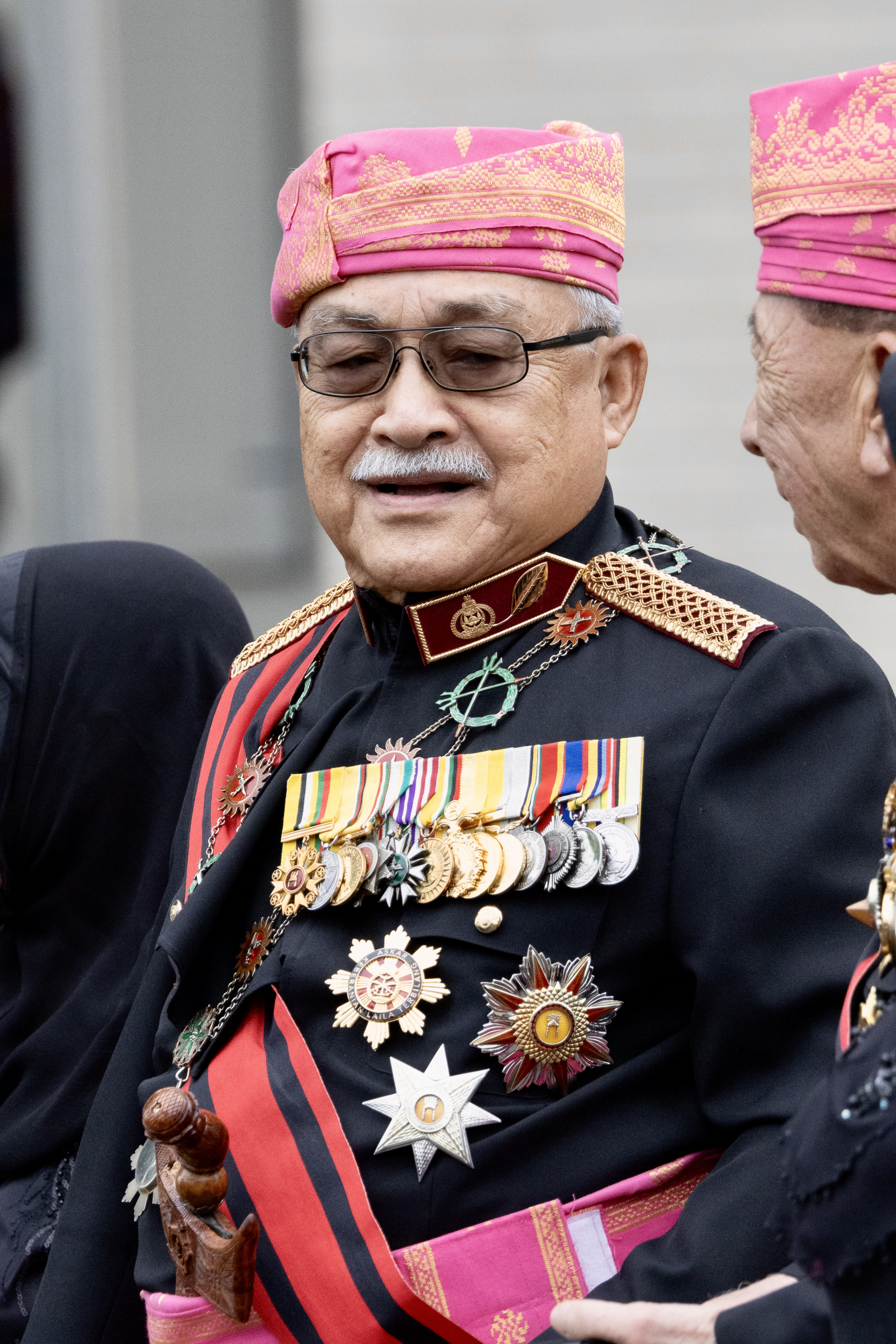
Major General Husin wearing his Pingat Jasa Gemilang (Tentera) in 2024

- 1994 – Major General Husin – Commander of the Royal Brunei Land Force
- 1995 – Colonel Kefli – Commander of the Royal Brunei Navy
- 1995 – Brigadier General Pengiran Abidin – Commander of the Royal Brunei Air Force
- 1996 – Brigadier General Shari – Commander of the Royal Brunei Land Force
- 1996 – Colonel Abdul Jalil – Commander of the Royal Brunei Navy
- 1999 – Colonel Ibrahim Mohammad – Commander of the Royal Brunei Air Force
- 2001 – Brigadier General Jaafar – Commander of the Royal Brunei Land Force
- 2002 – Major General Halbi – Commander of the Royal Brunei Land Force
- 2004 – Colonel Mahmud Saidin – Commander of the Royal Brunei Air Force
- 2005 – Colonel Abdu'r Rahmani – Commander of the Royal Brunei Land Force
- 2005 – Colonel Joharie Matussin – Commander of the Royal Brunei Navy
- 2007 – Colonel Rosli Chuchu – Commander of the Royal Brunei Land Force
- 2010 – Major General Aminuddin Ihsan – Commander of the Royal Brunei Armed Force
- 2011 – First Admiral Abdul Halim – Commander of the Royal Brunei Navy
- 2015 – First Admiral Abdul Aziz – Commander of the Royal Brunei Navy
- 2016 – Brigadier General Pengiran Aminan – Commander of the Royal Brunei Land Force
- 2017 – Brigadier General Shahril Anwar – Commander of the Royal Brunei Air Force
- 2017 – First Admiral Pengiran Norazmi – Commander of the Royal Brunei Navy
- 2019 – Brigadier General Khairul Hamed – Commander of the Royal Brunei Land Force
- 2020 – Major General Hamzah – Commander of the Royal Brunei Armed Forces
- 2022 – Brigadier General Mohammad Sharif – Commander of the Royal Brunei Air Force
- 2022 – Major General Muhammad Haszaimi – Commander of the Royal Brunei Armed Force
- 2022 – Brigadier General Abdul Razak – Deputy Minister of Defence
- 2022 – First Admiral Spry – Commander of the Royal Brunei Navy

=== France ===
- 2012 – General Jean-Paul Paloméros – Chief of Staff of the Air Force
- 2014 – General Denis Mercier – Chief of Staff of the Air Force
- 2024 - General Stéphane Mille - Chief of Staff of the French Air and Space Force

=== Germany ===
- 2023 – Lieutenant General Alfons Mais – Inspector of the Army
- 2024 - Vice Admiral Thomas Daum - Inspector of the Cyber and Information Domain Service
- 2024 - Vice Admiral Jan Christian Kaack - Inspector of the Navy

=== Indonesia ===
- 1992 – Air Chief Marshal Siboen Dipoatmodjo – Chief of Staff of the Indonesian Air Force
- 1992 – Admiral Muhamad Arifin – Chief of Staff of the Indonesian Navy
- 1995 – Admiral Tanto Kuswanto – Chief of Staff of the Indonesian Navy
- 1996 – General R. Hartono – Chief of Staff of the Indonesian Army
- 1997 – General Wiranto – Chief of Staff of the Indonesian Army
- 1997 - General Arief Koeshariadi - Chief of Staff of the Indonesian Navy
- 1999 – General Subagyo Hadi Siswoyo – Chief of Staff of the Indonesian Army
- 2001 – General Tyasno Sudarto – Chief of Staff of the Indonesian Army
- 2006 – Air Chief Marshal Djoko Suyanto – Chief of Staff of the Indonesian Air Force
- 2009 – General Agustadi Sasongko Purnomo – Chief of Staff of the Indonesian Army
- 2009 – Air Chief Marshal Soebandrio – Chief of Staff of the Indonesian Air Force
- 2011 – General George Toisutta – Chief of Staff of the Indonesian Army
- 2011 – Air Chief Marshal Imam Sufaat – Chief of Staff of the Indonesian Air Force
- 2012 – General Pramono Edhie Wibowo – Chief of Staff of the Indonesian Army
- 2012 – Admiral Soeparno – Chief of Staff of the Indonesian Navy
- 2013 – General Moeldoko – Commander of the Indonesian National Armed Forces
- 2015 – Air Chief Marshal Ida Bagus Putu Dunia – Chief of Staff of the Indonesian Air Force
- 2015 – General Budiman – Chief of Staff of the Indonesian Army
- 2015 – Admiral Marsetio – Chief of Staff of the Indonesian Navy
- 2016 – General Gatot Nurmantyo – Commander of the Indonesian National Armed Forces
- 2017 – Air Chief Marshal Agus Supriatna – Chief of Staff of the Indonesian Air Force
- 2017 – Admiral Ade Supandi – Chief of Staff of the Indonesian Navy
- 2018 – Air Chief Marshal Hadi Tjahjanto – Commander of the Indonesian National Armed Forces
- 2018 – General Mulyono – Chief of Staff of the Indonesian Army
- 2022 – General Andika Perkasa – Commander of the Indonesian National Armed Forces
- 2022 – Air Chief Marshal Yuyu Sutisna – Chief of Staff of the Indonesian Air Force
- 2022 – Admiral Yudo Margono – Chief of Staff of the Indonesian Navy
- 2022 – Air Chief Marshal Fadjar Prasetyo – Chief of Staff of the Indonesian Air Force
- 2023 – General Dudung Abdurachman – Chief of Staff of the Indonesian Army
- 2024 – General Agus Subiyanto – Commander of the Indonesian National Armed Forces
- 2025 – Admiral Muhammad Ali – Chief of Staff of the Indonesian Navy
- 2025 – General Maruli Simanjuntak – Chief of Staff of the Indonesian Army)

=== Sweden ===
- 1998 – Vice Admiral Peter Nordbeck – Chief of Navy Command
- 2004 – Rear Admiral Jörgen Ericsson – Inspector of the Navy
- 2007 – Rear Admiral Anders Grenstad – Inspector of the Navy
- 2014 – Rear Admiral Jan Thörnqvist – Chief of Navy

=== Thailand ===
- 2000 – General Surayud Chulanont – Commander in Chief of the RTA
- 2001 – Air Chief Marshal Sanan Thuathip – Commander in of the RTAF
- 2003 – Air Chief Marshal Kongsak Vantana – Commander in of the RTAF
- 2004 – Admiral Taweesak Somapha – Commanders in Chief of the RTN
- 2004 – General Chaiyasit Shinawatra – Commander in Chief of the RTA
- 2005 – General Prawit Wongsuwon – Commander in Chief of the RTA
- 2009 – Air Chief Marshal Itthaporn Subhawong – Commander in of the RTAF
- 2010 – Admiral Khamthorn Pumhiran – Commanders in Chief of the RTN
- 2012 – General Anupong Paochinda – Commander in Chief of the RTA
- 2012 – General Prayut Chan-o-cha – Commander in Chief of the RTA
- 2013 – Admiral Surasak Runroengrom – Commanders in Chief of the RTN
- 2013 – Air Chief Marshal Prajin Juntong – Commander in of the RTAF
- 2015 – Air Chief Marshal Treetod Sonjance – Commander in of the RTAF
- 2017 – General Thirachai Nakwanich – Commander in Chief of the RTA
- 2018 – Admiral Naris Pratumsuwan – Commanders in Chief of the RTN
- 2018 – General Chalermchai Sitthisart – Commander in Chief of the RTA
- 2018 – Air Chief Marshal Johm Rungsawang – Commander in of the RTAF
- 2019 – Air Chief Marshal Chaiyapruk Didyasarin – Commander in of the RTAF
- 2020 – General Apirat Kongsompong – Commander in Chief of the RTA
- 2022 – Air Chief Marshal Napadej Dhupatemiya – Commander in of the RTAF
- 2022 – Admiral Somprasong Nilsamai – Commanders in Chief of the RTN
- 2023 – General Narongpan Jitkaewtrue – Commander in Chief of the RTA

=== United States ===
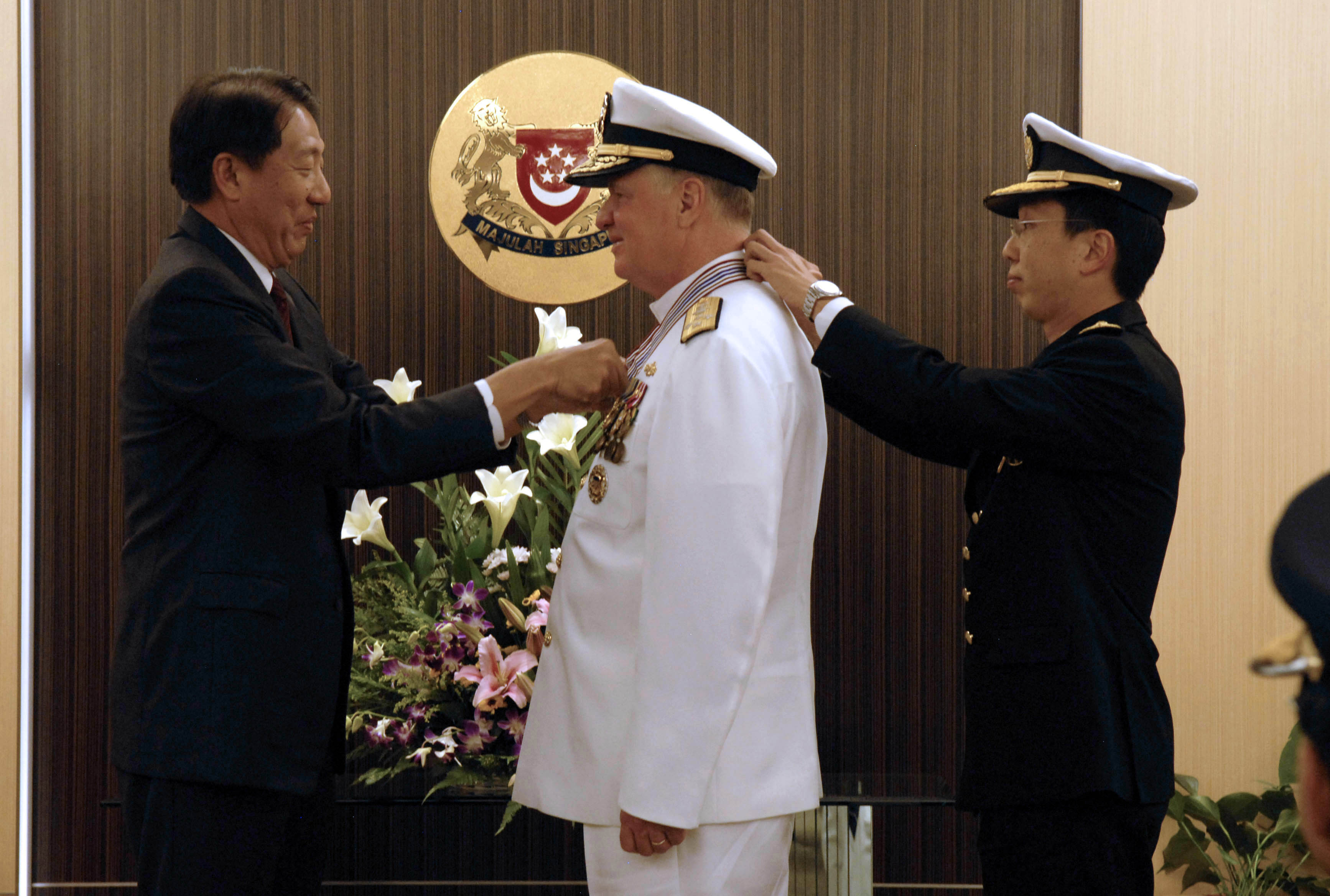
Admiral Gary Roughead receiving the Pingat Jasa Gemilang (Tentera)

- 2008 – General T. Michael Moseley – Chief of Staff of the Air Force
- 2008 – Admiral Gary Roughead – Chief of Naval Operations
- 2009 – General George W. Casey, Jr. – Chief of Staff of the Army
- 2013 – Admiral Jonathan Greenert – Chief of Naval Operations
- 2017 – Admiral Harry B. Harris Jr. – Commander, U.S. Pacific Command
- 2017 – Admiral John M. Richardson – Chief of Naval Operations
- 2022 – General Charles Q. Brown Jr. – Chief of Staff of the Air Force
- 2023 – General Paul M. Nakasone – Commander, United States Cyber Command
- 2023 – Admiral Michael M. Gilday – Chief of Naval Operations

== See also ==
- Category: Recipients of the Pingat Jasa Gemilang (Tentera)
- Category: Recipients of the Pingat Jasa Gemilang
