= Punpakdee Pattanakul =

Royal Thai Air Force officer (born 1965)

Air chief marshal Punpakdee Pattanakul MVM PCh
- พันธ์ภักดี พัฒนกุล
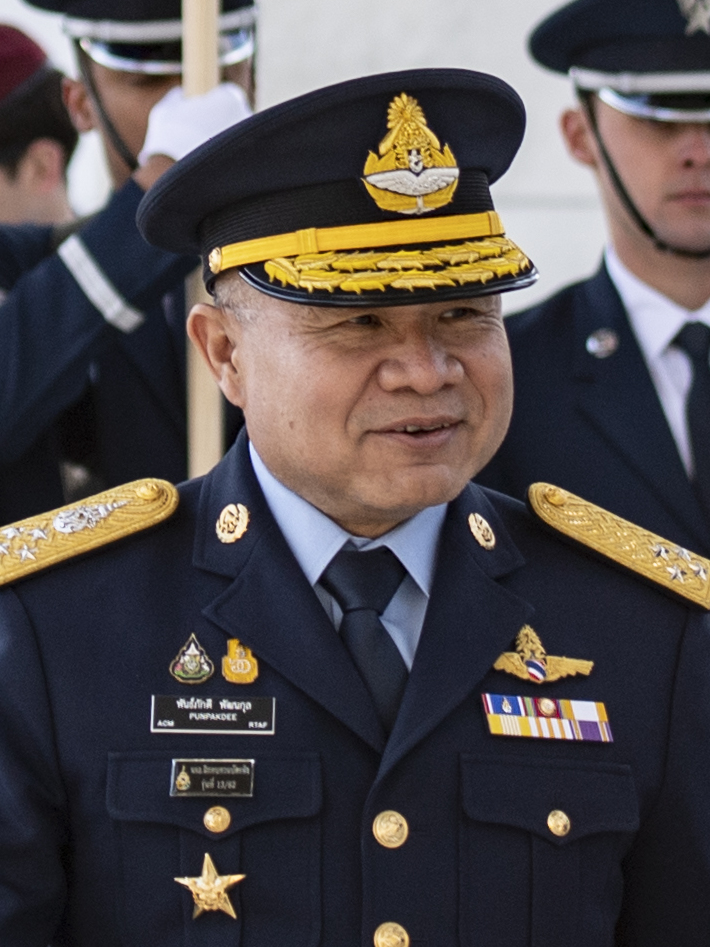

Commander-in-Chief of the Royal Thai Air Force
- Incumbent
- Assumed office 1 October 2023
- Preceded by: Alongkorn Wannarot

Member of the Senate of Thailand
- In office 1 December 2023 – 10 July 2024
- Preceded by: Alongkorn Wannarot

Personal details
- Born: 28 March 1965 (age 61) Thung Song, Nakhon Si Thammarat, Thailand
- Spouse: Monthira Pattanakul
- Nickname: Kai

Military service
- Allegiance: Thailand
- Branch/service: Royal Thai Air Force
- Rank: Air chief marshal
- Commands: Royal Thai Air Force

Punpakdee Pattanakul (Thai: พันธ์ภักดี พัฒนกุล) is a retired Royal Thai Air Force officer who served as the Commander-in-Chief of the Royal Thai Air Force from 2023 to 2025.

== Early life and education ==
Punpakdee was born in Pak Phraek Subdistrict, Thung Song district, Nakhon Si Thammarat province, in 1965. He attended Armed Forces Academies Preparatory School and Navaminda Kasatriyadhiraj Royal Thai Air Force Academy.

In 2020, he served as the Director of Directorate of Intelligence. In 2021 he served as Chief of the Air Staff before served as Commander-in-Chief of the Royal Thai Air Force in the next year. and got appointed in 2023.

== Honours ==
- 2025 – Knight Grand Cross (First Class) of The Most Exalted Order of the White Elephant
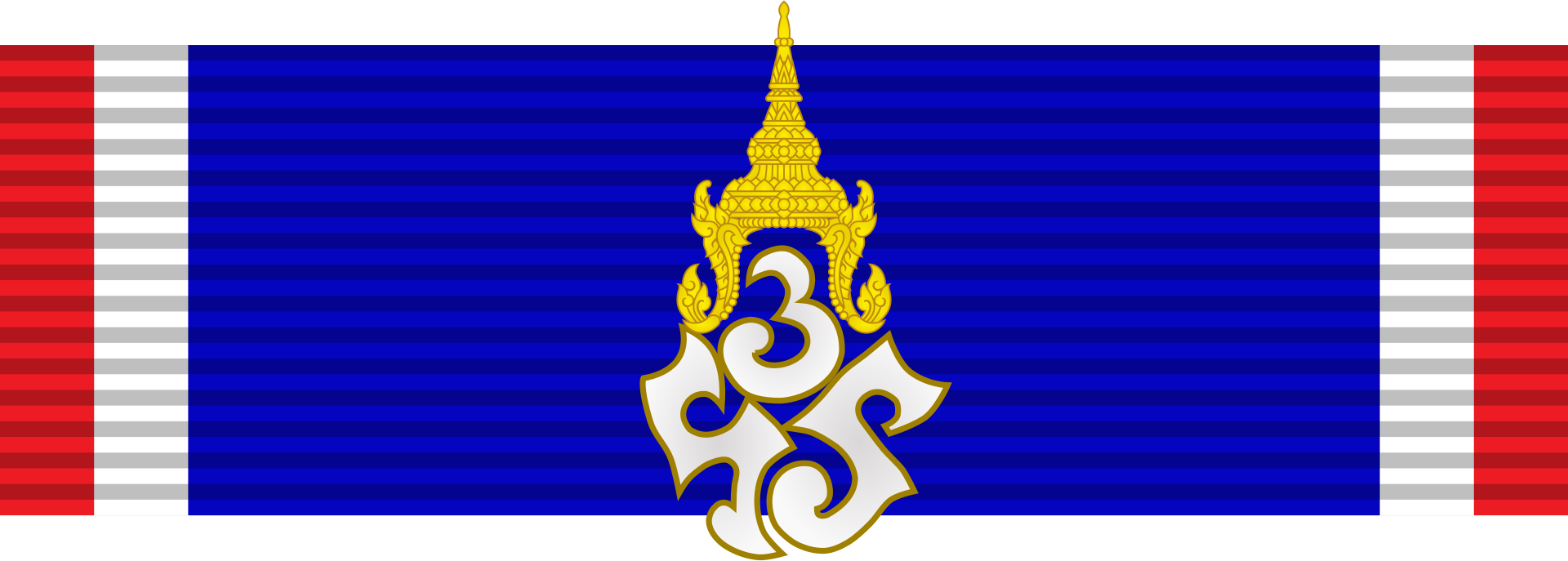
- 2023 – Knight Grand Cordon (Special Class) of The Most Noble Order of the Crown of Thailand
- 2001 – Freemen Safeguarding Medal (Second Class, Second Category)
- 2015 – Chakra Mala Medal
- 2025 – Commander of the Legion of Merit
- 2025 – Pingat Jasa Gemilang (Tentera)
