= Muhammad Raynan Rizky Akbar =

1. REDIRECT Draft:Muhammad Raynan Rizky Akbar
