= Tjahjanto =

Tjahjanto is a surname. Notable people with the surname include:

- Hadi Tjahjanto (born 1963), Indonesian politician
- Timo Tjahjanto (born 1980), Indonesian film director, producer, and screenwriter
