= Chalit Pukbhasuk =

Thai air force officer

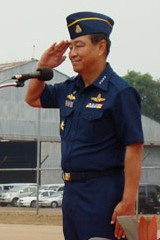
- Born: 5 April 1948 (age 78); Bangkok, Thailand
- Military career
- Allegiance: Thailand
- Branch: Royal Thai Air Force
- Rank: Air Chief Marshal
- Commands: Commander-in-Chief
- Conflicts: Cold War; Communist insurgency in Thailand; Vietnamese border raids in Thailand; Thai–Laotian Border War; Operation Pochentong

Air Chief Marshal Chalit Pukbhasuk PC (Thai: ชลิต พุกผาสุข, RTGS: Chalit Phukphasuk) (born 5 April 1948) is a retired Thai air force officer, a commander of the Royal Thai Air Force and the acting chairman of Council for National Security, the junta that overthrew the government of former Prime Minister Thaksin Shinawatra in the 2006 coup d'état.

== Biography ==
Chalit graduated from the Royal Thai Air Force Academy and held many key positions in the Air Force, including that of air attaché in Jakarta. Prior to becoming Commander of the Air Force, he was the Air Force's chief of staff. Chalit was reportedly reluctant to support the 2006 Thai coup d'état – Royal Thai Army troops had surrounded Air Force Headquarters on the night of the coup to ensure that Chalit and the Air Force did not provide any resistance.

Chalit was appointed a deputy chairman in the Council for National Security under coup leader, General Sonthi Boonyaratglin. Chalit was paid nearly 114,000 baht per month as an additional salary to his air force pay while he was deputy chairman.

Chalit was named as acting chairman of the Council for National Security on 1 October 2007, succeeding Sonthi, who retired from military duty to enter politics. In addition to his duties as air force chief and acting CNS head, Chalit also serves as chairman of the board of Thai Airways International. In 2011, Chalit was appointed by Bhumibol Adulyadej to Privy Council of Thailand.

Chalit is married to Assistant professor Dr. Phonthip Phukphasuk, a now retired professor for Thai language from the Faculty of Arts of Chulalongkorn University. They have two daughters.

== Honours ==
=== Royal Decorations ===
- Knight Grand Cordon of the Most Exalted Order of the White Elephant
- Knight Grand Cordon of the Most Noble Order of the Crown of Thailand
- Knight Grand Commander of the Most Illustrious Order of Chula Chom Klao
- Freemen Safeguarding Medal, 2nd Class 1st Cat
- Order of the Direkgunabhorn, Gold Medal
- Boy Scout Citation Medal of Vajira, First Class
- Chakra Mala Medal
- King Rama X Royal Cypher Medal, Third Class
- 25th Buddhist Century Celebration Medal

=== Foreign Honours ===
- Indonesia :
  - Grand Meritorious Military Order Star, Nararya Class
- Singapore :
  - Pingat Jasa Gemilang (Tentera)

Military offices
Preceded by Chaylim Choomcheun Sook (Acting)	Commander of the Royal Thai Air Force; 2005 – 2008	Succeeded by Itthaporn Subhawong
Government offices
Preceded by Sonthi Boonyaratglin	Chairman of the Council for National Security (Acting); 1 October 2007 – 7 February 2008	Abolished
