= Alongkorn Wannarot =

Thai Air Chief Marshal

- อลงกรณ์ วัณณรถ
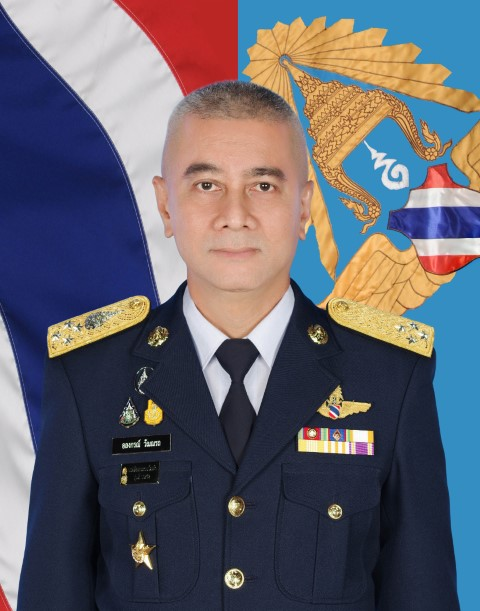

Commander of the Royal Thai Air Force
- In office 1 October 2022 – 30 September 2023
- Preceded by: Napadej Dhupatemiya
- Succeeded by: Punpakdee Pattanakul

Military service
- Allegiance: Thailand
- Branch/service: Royal Thai Air Force
- Years of service: ?–present
- Rank: Air Chief Marshal
- Commands: Commander-in-Chief of the Air Force

Alongkorn Wannarot (Thai: อลงกรณ์ วัณณรถ, RTGS: Alongkon Wannarot) is a Thai air force officer. From 1 October 2022 to 30 September 2023, he served as commander-in-chief of the Royal Thai Air Force. He previously served as assistant air force commander. Punpakdee Pattanakul was appointed his successor.

Military offices
Preceded by Napadej Dhupatemiya	Commander-in-chief of the Royal Thai Air Force; 2022–2023	Succeeded by Punpakdee Pattanakul
