= Chappy Hakim =

Indonesian air force officer

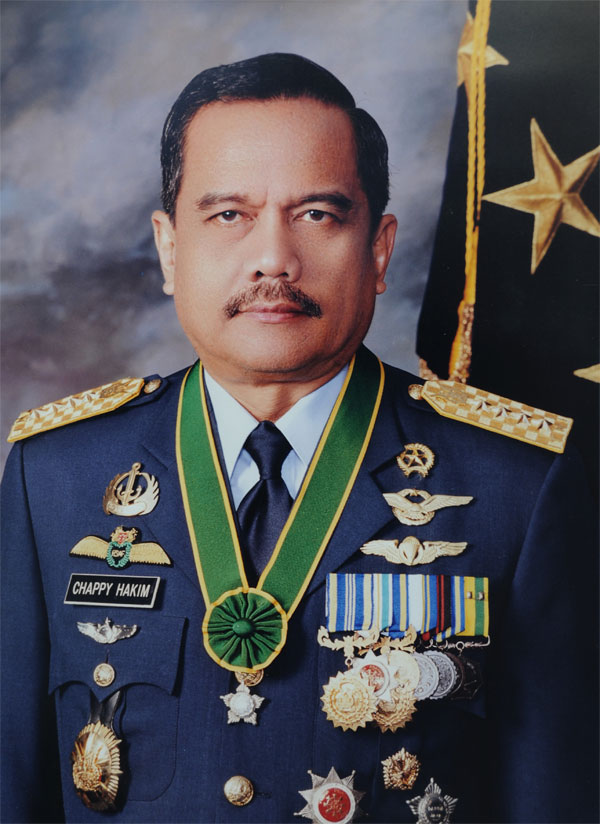
- Born: 17 December 1947 (age 78); Yogyakarta, Indonesia
- Military career
- Allegiance: Indonesia
- Branch: Indonesian Air Force
- Service years: 1969–2005
- Rank: Air Chief Marshal
- Unit: 31st Squadron C-130 Hercules
- Commands: Indonesian Air Force

Air Chief Marshal (Retired) Chappy Hakim, is the 14th Chief of Staff of the Indonesian Air Force who assumed his appointment from 2002 to 2005.

== Career ==
In 2019, ACM (Ret’d) Chappy Hakim founded and led PSAPI - the Indonesian Center for Air Power Studies or ICAP - Indonesia Center for Air Power Studies. PSAPI is composed of academics and practitioners in the field of aerospace with the main activity of conducting discussions and studies of various issues of Air and Space which are donated to decision makers through formal channels and through the media.

He is the 2nd of 7 children in the family of Abdul Hakim, a journalist and the founder of Antara News Agency, and Zubainar Hakim. Born in Yogyakarta on 17 December 1947, he attended kindergarten to high schools in Jakarta.

In 1961 he played the "Band Cilik" film with Mangapul Panggabean, Wolly Sutinah, Atmonadi and Soes D.A where Ling Inata was the film director.

After graduating from the Armed Forces Academy (better known as Akabri) - the Air Branch in 1971, Chappy Hakim attended the Air Force Pilot School and graduated in 1973, then he was assigned to Squadron 2 Light Transport at Halim Air Force Base which flew the Dakota type aircraft. Next, he was assigned as a seconded pilot to the Indonesian Army Aviation Unit, and on civil aviation, which includes PENAS, MNA and Mandala Airlines. At Mandala Airlines, Chappy Hakim flew a Vickers Viscount type aircraft and obtained an ATPL (Airline Transport Pilot License) license. Then he returned to the Air Force and flew C-130 Hercules Heavylift Transport until he was trusted to be the Commander of the 31st Squadron.

In the development of his following career, he attended the Junior Command School (SEKKAU), SIP (Flying Instructor School), the Air Command and Staff College (Seskoau), the Joint Armed Forces Command and Staff College (Seskogab) and the Indonesian National Resilience College (Lemhannas).

In addition to domestic education, he has also attended a variety of overseas education, including the Flight Test and Aircraft Development Course, BAE Brough England / UK, Instructor Course C-130 Simulator in Lockheed, Georgia, USA, ADF Joint Exercise Planning Staff, Australia, Observer Training Course, USAFA, Colorado Spring, USA and Short Course on Aerodynamic, Cranfield Institute of Technology, UK.

Furthermore, he has held a number of strategic positions. These, among others, are Commander of 31st Squadron Heavylift Transport. Commander of Sulaiman Air Force Base, Margahayu, Bandung, West Java, Director of Air Force Operations and Training, Governor/Superintendent of the Air Force Academy, Assistant to the Chief of Air Force Staff for Personnel, Commanding General of the Indonesian Military Academy and Chief of Staff of the Air Force Staff (Chief of the Indonesian Air Force).

During the tenure of his office as Chief of Staff of the Air Force from 2002 to 2005, it is noted there were records of such important events as the continuation of the Sukhoi fighter plane procurement process and the Bawean Incident (violation of Indonesia’s airspace by US Navy fighter aircraft).

As a pilot, he had more than 8 thousand flying hours on several types of aircraft, including the L-4J Piper Cub, T-41D Cessna, T-34A Mentor, Jet Trainer L-29 Dolphine, C-47 / DC-3. Dakota, VC-8 Vickers Viscount and C-130 H / L-100 Hercules and flew at VIP Pilot President.

In 2007, when there were many airplane accidents, he was assigned by the President of the Republic of Indonesia as Chairman of the National Committee for Transportation Safety (KNKT).

His works have won five records from the Indonesian Museum of Records (MURI), including "The Best Publisher of The Year" by publishing more than 160 books from all Air Force units in the period of one year. He is also the one who initiated the term "Tanah Air Udara Indonesia".

He was accused of assaulting Commission VII member Mukhtar Tompo after a hearing with several representatives of mining companies, including Freeport Indonesia, after which he resigned as Director of Freeport Indonesia.

Chappy Hakim has been invited to become a keynote speaker on Aviation and Defense in various mainstream media, social media, radio and television.

He has written numerous articles to aviation think-thanks as a proponent of Indonesia improving its aviation sector. He has pointed out notable flaws in the management of numerous airports around the country which have faced an inability to handle increasingly busy air traffic lanes and greater influx of passengers. He has also written on Indonesia's lack of management of its own airspace due to the country's inability to meet safety standards specified by the International Civil Aviation Organisation (ICAO). In an interview, he said that he avoided flying with Lion Air or other Indonesia Airlines, with the exception of Garuda as he did not believe that the other Indonesian airlines did maintenance and training properly. He criticized the Indonesian government for poor national planning which has favoured civil commercial flights over the country's own national air defense and covered up the occurrence of aviation accidents.

=== Overseas education ===
- Flight Test and Aircraft Development Course, BAE Brough England/UK.
- Instructor Course C-130 Simulator di Lockheed Georgia USA
- Joint Exercise Planning Staff ADF, Australia.
- Observe Training Course USAFA Colorado Spring, USA.
- Short Course On Aerodynamic Cranfield Institute of Technology, United Kingdom

=== Positions ===
- Commander of 31st Squadron Heavylift Transport
- Commander of Sulaiman Air Force Base Margahayu, Bandung, West Java
- Director of Air Force Operations and Training
- Governor/Superintendent of the Air Force Academy
- Assistant to the Chief of Air Force Staff for Personnel
- Commanding General of the Indonesian Military Academy
- Chief of Staff of the Air Force Staff (Chief of the Indonesian Air Force).
- President Director of Freeport Indonesia

== Honours ==
- Singapore: Meritorious Service Medal (Military) (P.J.G.)
- South Korea: First Class (Tong-il) of the Order of National Security Merit

== Bibliography ==
=== Books ===
- Air Diplomacy
- Dari Segara ke Angkasa
- Cat Rambut Orang Yahudi
- Awas Ketabrak Pesawat
- Berdaulat di Udara
- Pelangi Dirgantara
- Saksofon
- Kapal Induk dan Human Error
- Pertahanan Indonesia – Angkatan Perang Negara Kepulauan
- Tanah Air Udara ku Indonesia
- Freeport – catatan pribadi
- Abdul Hakim Wartawan Antara dalam kenangan anak cucu
- Defence and Aviation
- Quo Vadis Kedaulatan Udara Indonesia
- Menjaga Ibu Pertiwi dan Bapak Angkasa
- Air Force Leadership
- Believe it or Not Dunia Penerbangan Indonesia
- Fenomena Pompa Bensin
- FIR di Kepulauan Riau
- Saya Pengen Jadi Pilot
- Tol Udara Nusantara
- Menata Ulang Penerbangan Nasional
- Rute Penerbangan Pemersatu Bangsa
- Band The Playsets
- Penegakan Kedaulatan Negara di Udara

=== Keynote speaker at various international forums ===
- United States-Indonesia (Usindo) in Washington D.C.
- Kokoda Foundation Canberra
- Australia. Regional Air Power Conference in LIMA
- Langkawi Malaysia
- Seminar on National Resilience at Lemhannas
- Keynote Speaker at the IATEC Conference
- AMROI International Conference
- Air Power International Seminar

=== Other strategic positions ===
- Senior Advisor at PT Danone Aqua
- Senior Advisor and CEO at PT Freeport Indonesia
- President Commissioner of PTDI
- Expert Staff Official and Advisor
- Minister of Transportation of the Republic of Indonesia
- Minister of Marine Affairs and Fisheries
- Task Force 115 INACOM of the Ministry of Industry

Military offices
Preceded by Hanafie Asnan	Chief of the Air Staff (TNI-AU); 2002 – 2005	Succeeded by Djoko Suyanto
