= Herman Prayitno =

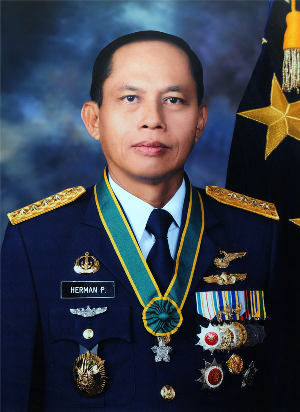
- Born: 9 January 1951 (age 75); Yogyakarta, Indonesia
- Military career
- Allegiance: Indonesia
- Branch: Indonesian Air Force
- Rank: Air Chief Marshal (Marsekal)
- Commands: Indonesian Air Force

Air Chief Marshal Herman Prayitno (born 9 January 1951 in Yogyakarta) was the Chief of Staff of the Indonesian Air Force from 13 February 2006 until 28 December 2007.

In September 2007, Prayitno announced that the air force would be increasing its capability by purchasing three maritime surveillance aircraft, six Sukhoi fighter jets, several NAS-332 Super Puma helicopters and KT-1B training aircraft.

In 2012, Prayitno was appointed Indonesia's ambassador to Malaysia and served until 2017.

Military offices
Preceded by Djoko Suyanto	Chief of the Air Staff (TNI-AU); 2006 – 2007	Succeeded by Soebandrio
