= Chaiyapruk Didyasarin =

Thai Air Chief Marshal

- ชัยพฤกษ์ ดิษยะศริน
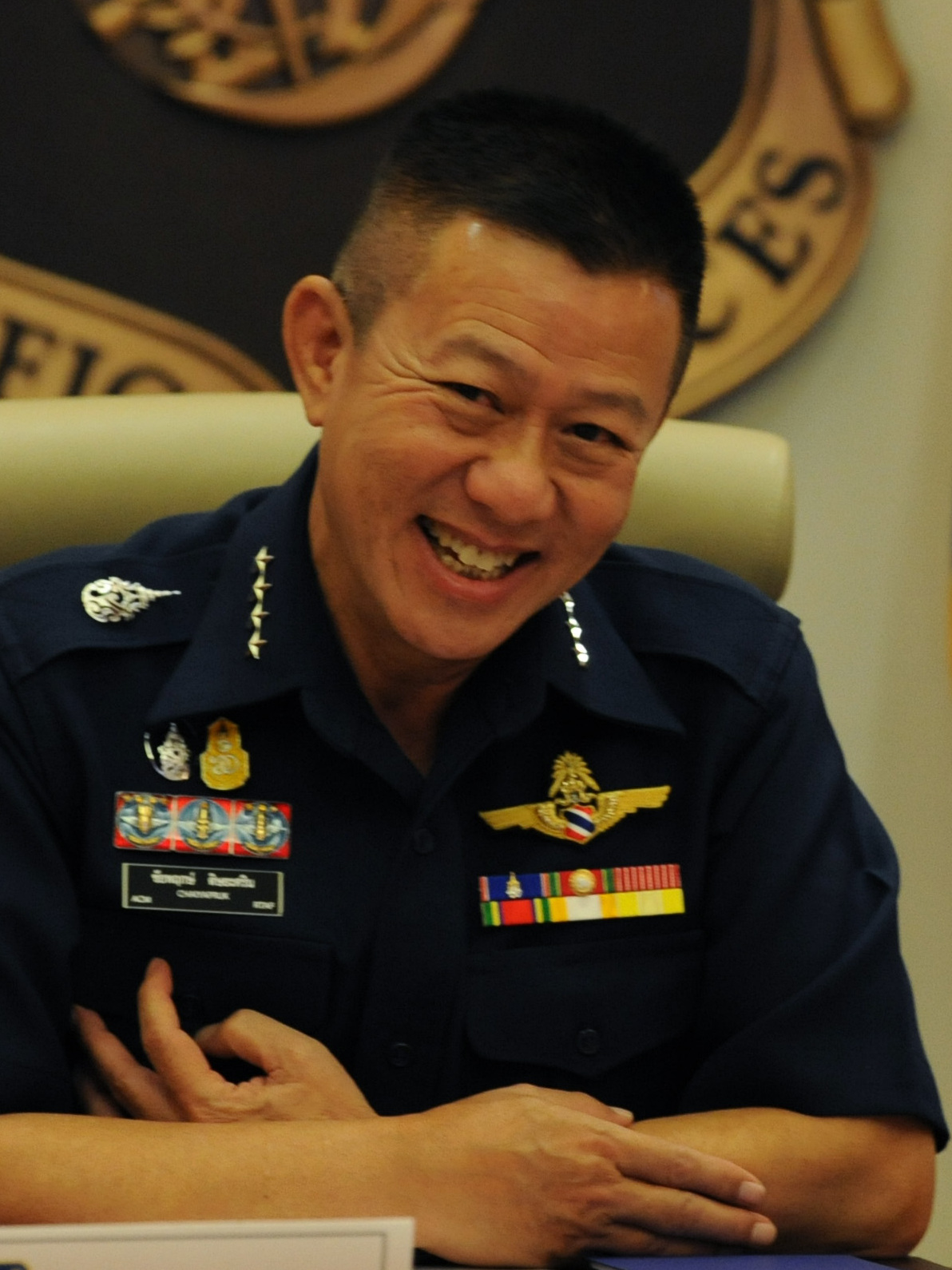

Commander of the Royal Thai Air Force
- In office 1 October 2018 – 30 September 2019
- Preceded by: Johm Rungsawang
- Succeeded by: Manat Wongwat

Personal details
- Born: 8 December 1958 (age 67)

Chaiyapruk Didyasarin (Thai: ชัยพฤกษ์ ดิษยะศริน; RTGS: Chaiyaphruek Dityasarin, born 8 December 1958) is a former Thai air force officer. He served as commander-in-chief of the Royal Thai Air Force from 1 October 2018 to 30 September 2019. Manat Wongwat was appointed his successor. As of 16 January 2020, he serves as chairman of the board of directors of Thai Airways.

In August 2019, he received Singapore's Meritorious Service Medal (Military) award.

Military offices
Preceded by Johm Rungsawang	Commander of the Royal Thai Air Force; 2018–2019	Succeeded by Manat Wongwat
