= Prajin Juntong =

Thai politician (born 1954)

- ประจิน จั่นตอง
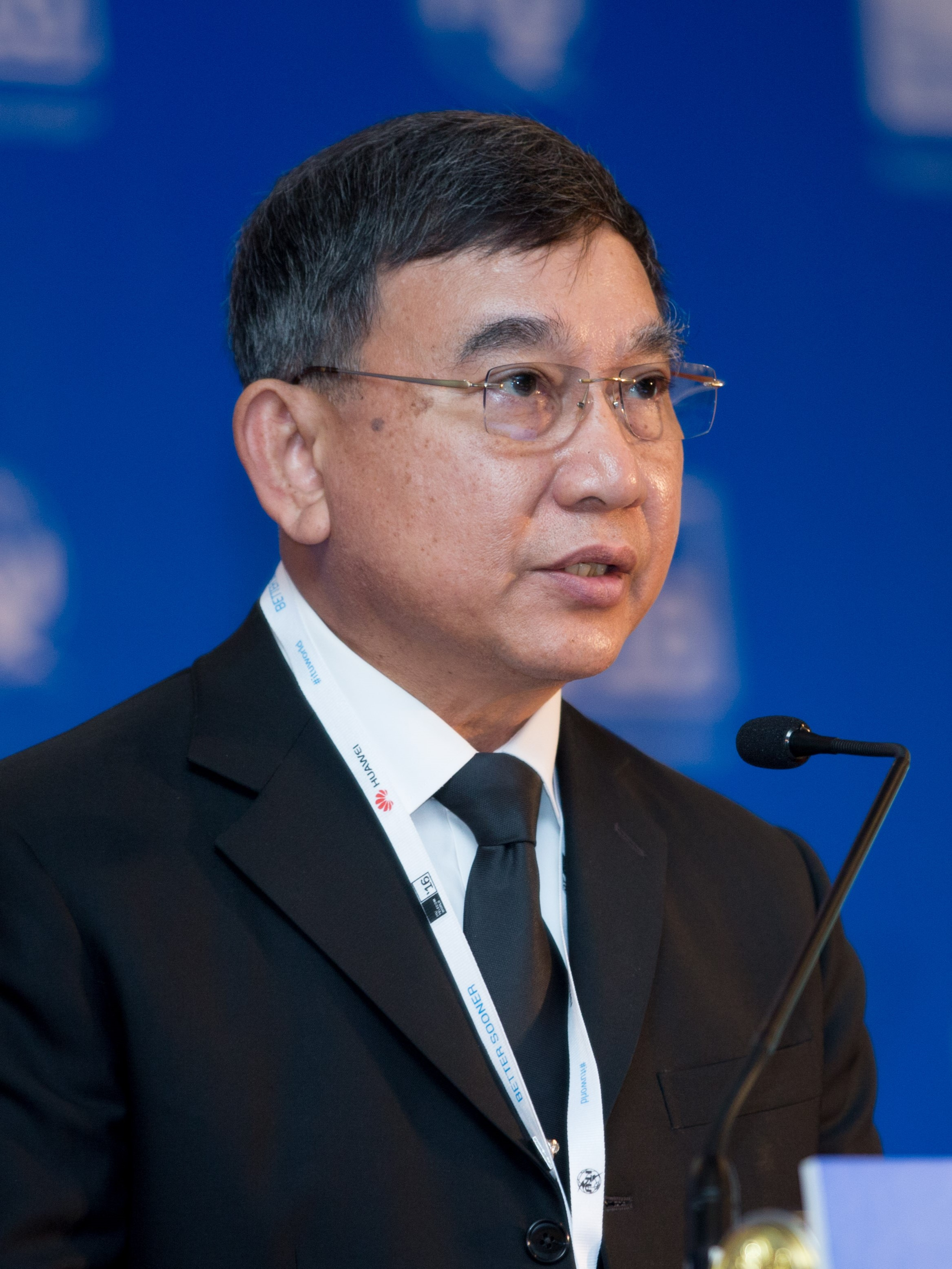
- Prajin Juntong at ITU Telecom World 2016

Deputy Prime Minister of Thailand
- In office 19 August 2015 – 8 May 2019
- Prime Minister: Prayut Chan-o-cha

Minister of Justice
- In office 23 November 2017 – 8 May 2019
- Prime Minister: Prayut Chan-o-cha
- Preceded by: Suwaphan Tanyuvardhana
- Succeeded by: Somsak Thepsuthin

Acting Minister of Information and Communication Technology
- In office 13 September 2016 – 15 September 2016
- Prime Minister: Prayut Chan-o-cha
- Preceded by: Uttama Savanayana
- Succeeded by: Position abolished

Minister of Transport
- In office 30 August 2014 – 19 August 2015
- Prime Minister: Prayut Chan-o-cha
- Preceded by: Chadchart Sittipunt
- Succeeded by: Arkom Termpittayapaisith

Commander in Chief of the Royal Thai Air Force
- In office 1 October 2012 – 30 September 2014
- Preceded by: Itthaporn Subhawong
- Succeeded by: Treetod Sonjance

Personal details
- Born: 7 March 1954 (age 72) Phitsanulok, Thailand
- Spouse: Jintana Juntong

Military service
- Allegiance: Thailand
- Branch/service: Royal Thai Air Force
- Years of service: 1974–2014

Prajin Juntong (Thai: ประจิน จั่นตอง, RTGS: Prachin Chantong; born 7 March 1954) is the Minister of Justice, serving until 8 May 2019, and the deputy chairman of the National Council for Peace and Order (NCPO). He also holds the post of deputy prime minister. From 2012 to 2014 he was the Commander in Chief of the Royal Thai Air Force (RTAF).

== Early life and education ==
Prajin attended Uttaradit School and Armed Forces Academies Preparatory School (class 13). After graduating from Royal Thai Air Force Academy (class 20) and National Defence College of Thailand (class 48). He graduated with a Ph.D. Public Administration Branch from the Institute of Public Administration, College of Public Administration Rangsit University in 2013.

== Air Force career ==
Prajin, served as Chief of the Air Staff on 1 October 2009, before serving as Assistant Air Force Commander on 1 October 2011. On 1 October 2012, he was promoted to commander-in-chief of the air force in 2012.

== Political careers ==
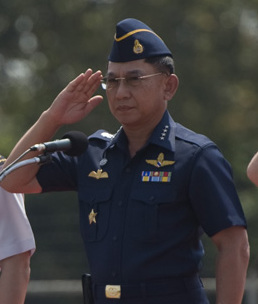
Prajin at Cope Tiger 13 closing ceremony

Later on 21 February 2014, the board of directors of Thai Airways International Public Company Limited resolved to grant Prajin, who held the position the first vice chairman of the board of directors to the chairman of the board of directors to replace Ampon Kittiampon, secretary general to the cabinet who resigned from being chairman of the board.

Prajin was appointed Minister of Transport in the government of Prayut Chan-ocha and served as deputy chairman of the National Council for Peace and Order until August 2015, was adapted to assume the position of Deputy Prime Minister responsible for the Ministry of Education, Ministry of Energy, Ministry of Information and Communication Technology and the Office of the National Research Council.

At the cabinet meeting on 13 September 2016, it was resolved to appoint Prajin as Deputy Prime Minister to oversee the Ministry of Information and Communication Technology to take charge of the position, replacing Uttama Savanayana, who had resigned from the position on 12 September 2016.

On 1 May 2018, he was appointed the chairman of the Committee on the Management of Rehabilitation of Children and Youth.

In 2019, Prajin was appointed senator by resigning from every position in the government.

== Decorations ==
- Thailand :
  - Knight Grand Cordon of the Order of the White Elephant
  - Knight Grand Cordon of the Order of the Crown of Thailand
  - Freeman Safeguarding Medal, 2nd Class 2nd Cat
  - Chakra Mala Medal
  - The Boy Scout Citation Medal, 1st Class
- Singapore :
  - Pingat Jasa Gemilang (Tentera)
- Indonesia :
  - Bintang Swa Bhuwana Paksa, 1st Class (2014)

Military offices
Preceded by Itthaporn Subhawong	Commander of the Royal Thai Air Force; 2012–2014	Succeeded by Treetod Sonjance
