= Johm Rungsawang =

Thai Air Chief Marshal (born 1958)

- จอม รุ่งสว่าง

Commander of the Royal Thai Air Force
- In office 1 October 2016 – 30 September 2018
- Preceded by: Treetod Sonjance
- Succeeded by: Chaiyapruk Didyasarin

Personal details
- Born: May 15, 1958 (age 68) Bangkok, Thailand
- Spouse: Korranan Rungsawang
- Education: Navaminda Kasatriyadhiraj Royal Thai Air Force Academy; National Defence College

Military service
- Allegiance: Thailand
- Branch/service: Royal Thai Air Force
- Rank: Air chief marshal

Johm Rungsawang (Thai: จอม รุ่งสว่าง, RTGS: Chom Rungsawang; born 15 May 1958) is a former Thai air force officer. He served as commander-in-chief of the Royal Thai Air Force from 1 October 2016 to 30 September 2018. Chaiyapruk Didyasarin was appointed his successor.

== Honours ==
received the following royal decorations in the Honours System of Thailand:

- Knight Grand Cordon of the Most Exalted Order of the White Elephant
- Knight Grand Cordon of the Most Noble Order of the Crown
- Knight Commander of the Most Illustrious Order of Chula Chom Klao
- Freeman Safeguarding Medal, 2nd Class 2nd Cat
- Chakra Mala Medal
- Boy Scout Citation Medal of Vajira, First Class
- King Rama X Royal Cypher Medal, 3rd Class

=== Foreign Honours ===
- USA :
  - Commander of the Legion of Merit
- Japan :
  - Order of the Rising Sun, 2nd Class
- Singapore :
  - Pingat Jasa Gemilang (Tentera)

Military offices
Preceded by Treetod Sonjance	Commander of the Royal Thai Air Force; 2016–2018	Succeeded by Chaiyapruk Didyasarin
