= Airbull Suttiwan =

Thai Air Chief Marshal

- แอร์บูล สุทธิวรรณ

Commander of the Royal Thai Air Force
- In office 1 October 2020 – 30 September 2021
- Preceded by: Manat Wongwat
- Succeeded by: Napadej Dhupatemiya

Personal details
- Born: 6 March 1961 (age 65)

Airbull Suttiwan (Thai: แอร์บูล สุทธิวรรณ, RTGS: Aebun Sutthiwan; born 6 March 1961) is a Thai air force officer. From 1 October 2020 to 30 September 2021, he served as commander-in-chief of the Royal Thai Air Force. Napadej Dhupatemiya was appointed his successor.

Military offices
Preceded by Manat Wongwat	Commander of the Royal Thai Air Force; 2020–2021	Succeeded by Napadej Dhupatemiya
