= Gatot Nurmantyo =

Indonesian general (born 1960)

General (Ret.) Gatot Nurmantyo
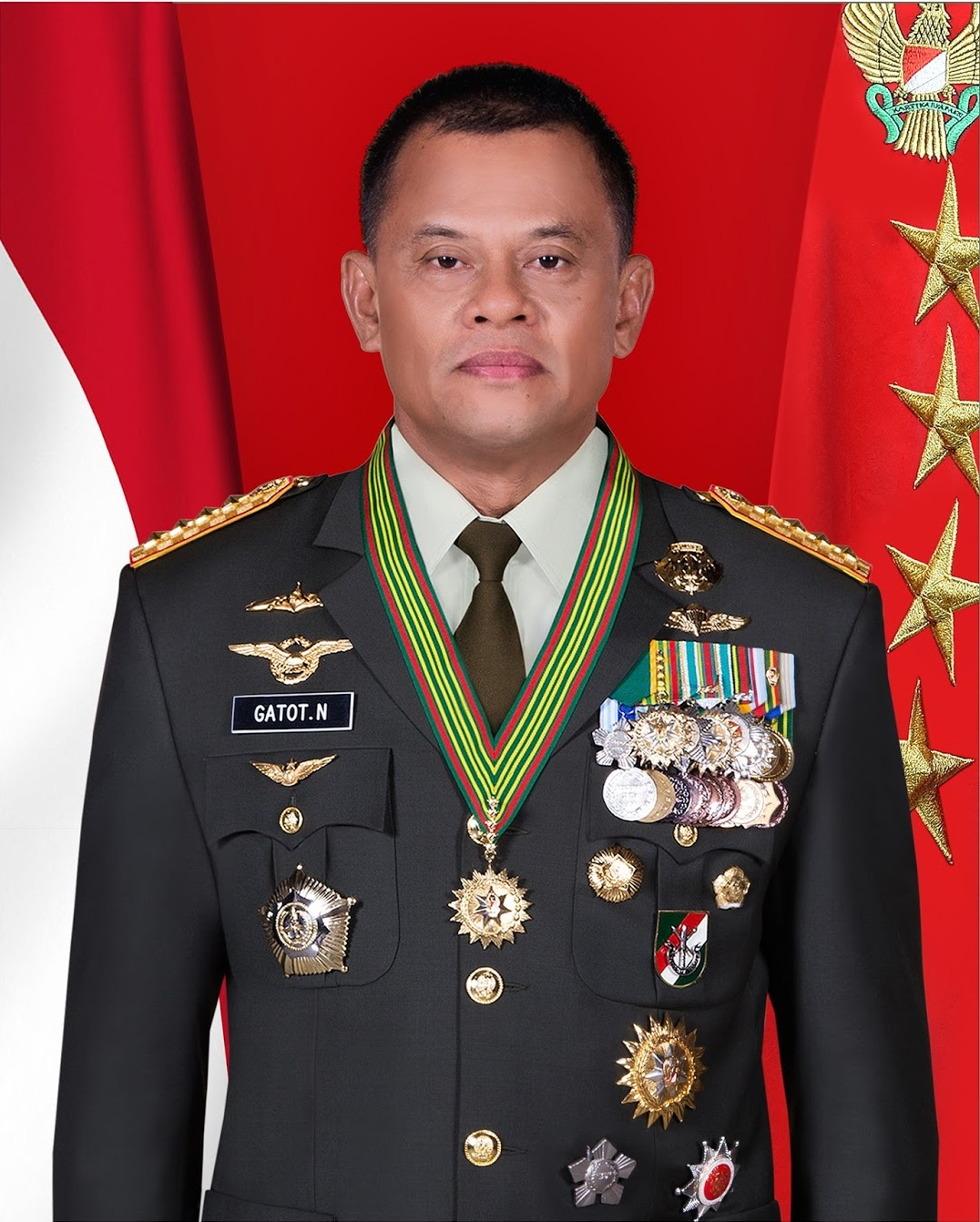
- Official portrait, 2015

Commander of the National Armed Forces
- In office 8 July 2015 – 8 December 2017
- President: Joko Widodo
- Preceded by: General Moeldoko
- Succeeded by: ACM Hadi Tjahjanto

Chief of Staff of the Army
- In office 25 July 2014 – 15 July 2015
- President: Susilo Bambang Yudhoyono; Joko Widodo
- Preceded by: General Budiman
- Succeeded by: General Mulyono

Commander of Army Strategic Command
- In office 2 June 2013 – 26 September 2014
- President: Susilo Bambang Yudhoyono
- Preceded by: Lieutenant General Muhammad Munir
- Succeeded by: Lieutenant General Mulyono

Personal details
- Born: 13 March 1960 (age 66) Tegal, Central Java, Indonesia
- Spouse: Enny Trimurti
- Education: Indonesian Military Academy

Military service
- Allegiance: Indonesia
- Branch/service: Indonesian Army
- Years of service: 1982–2018
- Rank: General
- Commands: Commander of the Indonesian National Armed Forces; Chief of Staff of the Indonesian Army; Commander of Army Strategic Command

General (Ret.) Gatot Nurmantyo (born 13 March 1960) is a retired Indonesian Army general who was commander (Panglima) of the Indonesian National Armed Forces (TNI) from 8 July 2015 until 8 December 2017. Previously, he was the 30th Army Chief of Staff from 25 July 2014 after being appointed by President Yudhoyono to replace General Budiman. From 2013 to 2014, he was Commander of Army Strategic Command (Kostrad), replacing Lieutenant General Muhammad Munir.

In June 2015, he was nominated by President Joko "Jokowi" Widodo to replace TNI commander General Moeldoko, who was nearing retirement age. His appointment was then confirmed by the DPR. In December 2017, as Nurmantyo neared retirement age (in March 2018), the president announced his intention to replace him with Air Force Chief-of-Staff Air Chief Marshal Hadi Tjahjanto as TNI commander.

Nurmantyo joined government officials and social activists in a march to support religious tolerance during the November 2016 Jakarta protests. Alongside Social Affairs Minister Khofifah Indar Parawansa, Indonesian National Police chief Tito Karnavian and Islamic activist Yenny Wahid, he led public support of interfaith unity as a counterbalance to protests against Jakarta's Christian ethnic-Chinese governor Basuki Tjahaja Purnama which included elements of intolerance and Sinophobia.

== Presidential aspiration ==
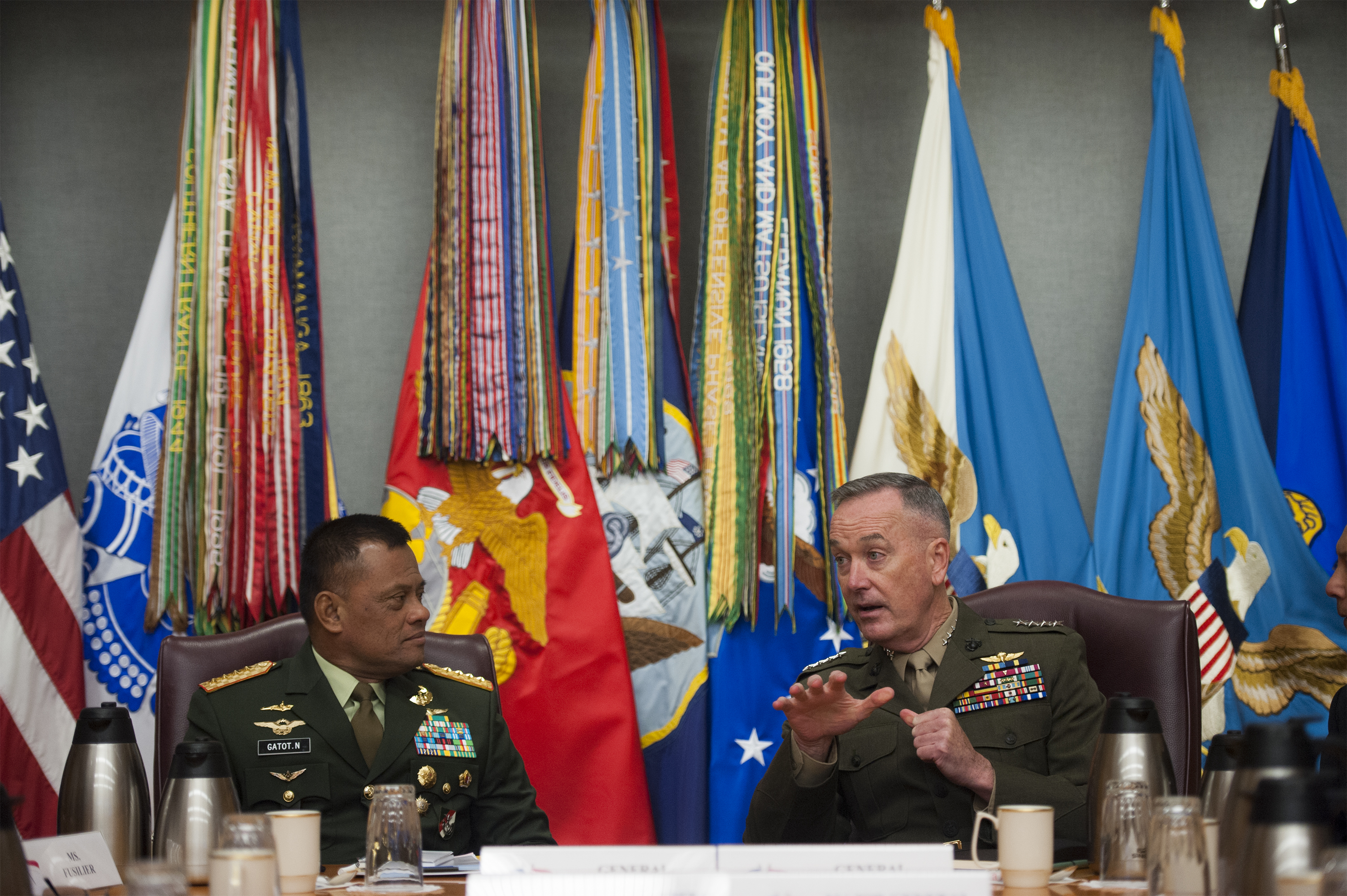
Gen. Gatot Nurmantyo with Gen. Joseph Dunford

Nurmantyo officially retired from military service on 31 March 2018 amid rising speculation he would run for the presidency in 2019. On 6 April 2018, a group called Gatot Nurmantyo for the People (GNR) nominated Gatot as a candidate for Indonesia's 2019 presidential election.

In an interview published by Tempo in April 2018, he responded positively to calls for him to run for the presidency, saying: "If the Republic calls and the people wish, I will be ready no matter what." He said democracy is in the hands of the people, "but it is Allah who has the final say. So, anyone who becomes the president is by the will of Allah and we must support him or her." Asked if he was interested in becoming President Jokowi's running mate, he responded: "I'm not a political whore." He admitted Jokowi's rival, opposition leader Prabowo Subianto, had invited him to join his Gerindra Party.

== Ties to Tomy Winata ==
Gatot has acknowledged he is close to tycoon and banker Tomy Winata. “People say that I have a close relationship with Tomy Winata. That's true. I will never be ashamed of that because I personally know his commitment,” he said. Their relationship started in 1997, when Winata's Artha Graha Bank acquired Arta Prima Bank, which was then renamed Pratama Bank. At the time, Gatot was Secretary Commissioner of Artha Graha Bank. The Indonesian media has speculated Winata might be providing financial backing for Gatot to run for the presidency in 2019.

== Honours ==
Gatot is the recipient of the following honours:

Star of Mahahaputera, 2nd Class (Bintang Mahaputera Adipradana)
Military Distinguished Service Star (Bintang Dharma)	Grand Meritorious Military Order Star, 1st Class (Bintang Yudha Dharma Utama)	Army Meritorious Service Star, 1st Class (Bintang Bintang Kartika Eka Pakçi Utama)	Navy Meritorious Service Star, 1st Class (Bintang Jalasena Utama)
Air Force Meritorius Service Star, 1st Class (Bintang Swa Bhuwana Paksa Utama)	National Police Meritorious Service Star, 1st Class (Bintang Bhayangkara Utama)	Grand Meritorious Military Order Star, 2nd Class (Bintang Yudha Dharma Pratama)	Army Meritorious Service Star, 2nd Class (Bintang Bintang Kartika Eka Pakçi Pratama)
Grand Meritorious Military Order Star, 3rd Class (Bintang Yudha Dharma Nararya)	Army Meritorious Service Star, 3rd Class (Bintang Bintang Kartika Eka Pakçi Nararya)	Military Long Service Medal, 32 Years (Satyalancana Kesetiaan 32 Tahun)	Army Service Medal (Satyalancana Dharma Bantala)
Military Long Service Medal, 24 Years (Satyalancana Kesetiaan 24 Tahun)	Military Long Service Medal, 16 Years (Satyalancana Kesetiaan 16 Tahun)	Military Long Service Medal, 8 Years (Satyalancana Kesetiaan 8 Tahun)	Military Operation Service Medal IX Raksaka Dharma (Satyalancana Gerakan Operasi Militer "GOM" IX Raksaka Dharma)
National Defence Service Medal (Satyalancana Dharma Nusa)	Outer Islands Guard Medal (Satyalancana Wira Nusa)	Border Guard Medal (Satyalancana Wira Dharma)	Special Forces Medal (Satyalancana Ksatria Tudha)
Timor Military Campaign Medal (Satyalancana Seroja)w/ 2 silver star	Military Instructor Service Medals (Satyalancana Dwidya Sistha)	Social Welfare Medal (Satyalancana Kebaktian Sosial)	Courageous Commander of The Most Gallant Order of Military Service (Panglima Gagah Angkatan Tentera)(Malaysia)
The Most Exalted Order of Famous Valour (Darjah Paduka Keberanian Laila Terbilang Yang Amat Gemilang), 1st Class (Brunei)	Distinguished Service Order (Military) (Darjah Utama Bakti Cemerlang (Tentera))(Singapore)	Meritorious Service Medal (Military) (Pingat Jasa Gemilang (Tentera))(Singapore)	1st Class (Tong-il Medal) of the Order of National Security Merit (South Korea)

Military offices
Preceded by Budiman	Chief of Staff of Indonesian Army; 2014−2015	Succeeded by Mulyono
Preceded by Moeldoko	Commander of Indonesian Armed Forces; 2015–2017	Succeeded by Hadi Tjahjanto
