= Muhammad Raynan Rizky Akbar =

Indonesian student activist

- Born: 9 April 2005 (age 21); Malang, East Java, Indonesia
- Education: University of Brawijaya
- Occupation: Student activist
- Known for: Founder of Aktivis Indonesia; Chairman of HMI Faculty of Medicine Commissariat, University of Brawijaya (2026-2027)
- Relatives: Darwan Triyono (father); Hadi Tjahjanto (uncle)

Muhammad Raynan Rizky Akbar (born 9 April 2005) is an Indonesian student activist. He founded the group Aktivis Indonesia and became chairman of the Muslim Students' Association (HMI) commissariat at the University of Brawijaya's Faculty of Medicine (HMI FK UB) for the 2026-2027 term.

== Early life and family ==
Raynan was born on 9 April 2005 in Malang, East Java. His father, Darwan Triyono, is an ophthalmologist and the director of Daha Husada Regional General Hospital in Kediri. His uncle is retired Indonesian Air Force Marshal Hadi Tjahjanto, who served as Commander of the Indonesian National Armed Forces and Coordinating Minister for Political, Legal, and Security Affairs.

Raynan graduated from SMA Negeri 2 Kediri. In 2023, he entered the Faculty of Medicine at the University of Brawijaya as an undergraduate medical student.

== Activism ==
During his first year of university, Raynan established Aktivis Indonesia. In 2025, the Faculty of Medicine's Student Executive Board (BEM FK UB) appointed him Minister of Action, Studies, and Propaganda (Menteri Aksi, Kajian, dan Propaganda).

In 2025, Raynan coordinated student protests in Malang against state budget cuts in February, revisions to the Indonesian National Armed Forces Law (RUU TNI) in March, and police actions in October. In December 2025, he led a field survey on stroke awareness at Saiful Anwar Regional General Hospital (RSSA). In May 2026, he was inaugurated as chairman of the HMI commissariat at the university's Faculty of Medicine for the 2026-2027 period.

== Controversy ==
In June 2026, photographs of Raynan's family circulated on Indonesian social media. Commentators and rival student groups noted his relationship to former military commander Hadi Tjahjanto and hospital director Darwan Triyono, and they questioned whether his family ties protected his group from police intervention during protests against the Armed Forces Law revisions.

== Awards ==
- Most Active Strategic Studies Coordinator, Indonesian Medical Student Senate Association (ISMKI) (2025)
- Best Faculty of Medicine Ambassador, University of Brawijaya (2025)
