= Chief of Staff of the Indonesian Air Force =

Chief of Staff of Indonesian Air Force
- Kepala Staf TNI Angkatan Udara

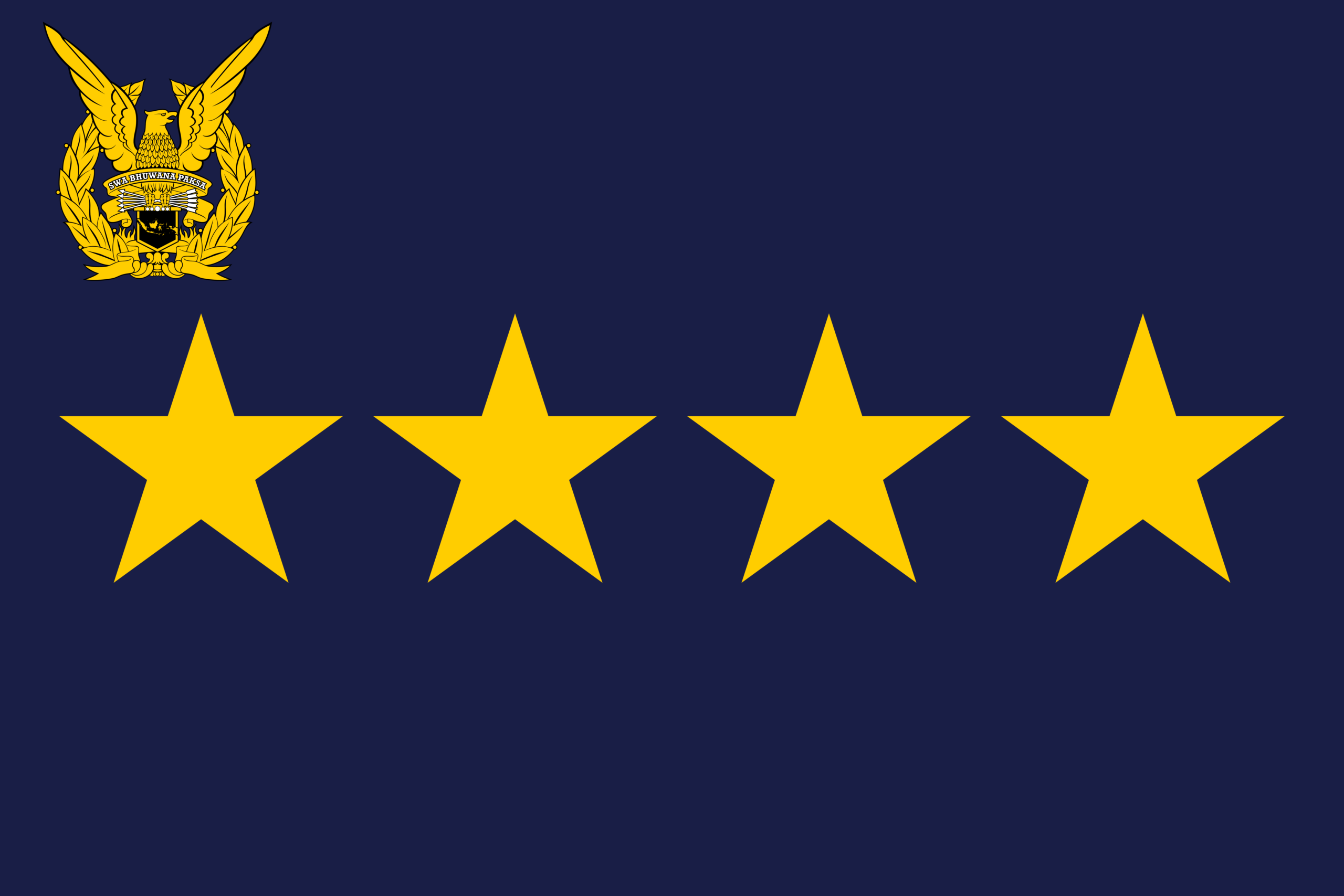
- Flag of the Chief of Staff

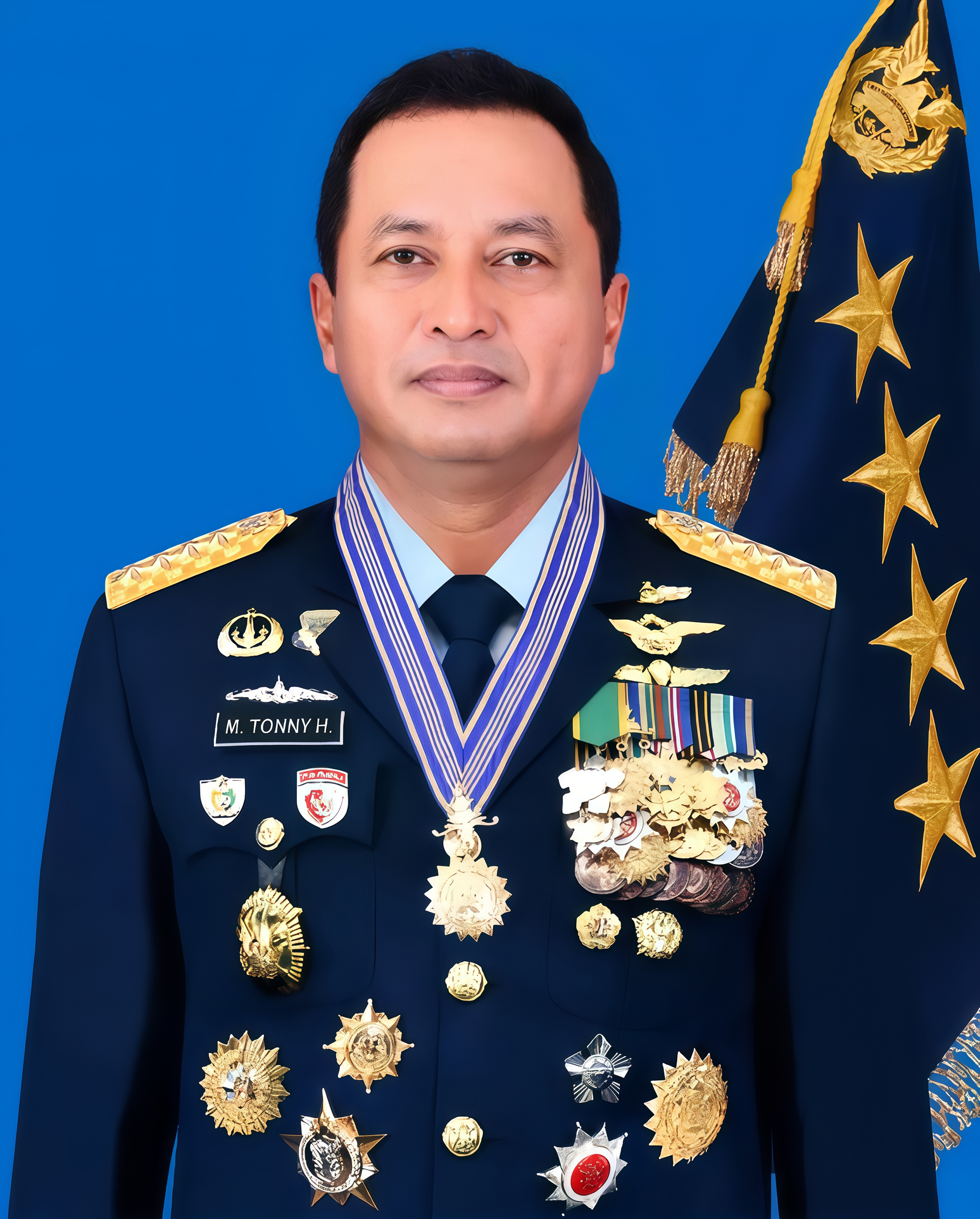
- Incumbent; Air Chief Marshal Mohamad Tony Harjono since 5 April 2024
- Indonesian Air Force
- Abbreviation: KSAU / Kasau
- Reports to: Commander of the Indonesian National Armed Forces
- Residence: Rumah Dinas KASAU, Halim Perdanakusuma
- Seat: Air Force Headquarters, Cilangkap, Jakarta
- Nominator: Commander of the Indonesian National Armed Forces
- Appointer: President of Indonesia
- Formation: 9 April 1946; 80 years ago
- First holder: Air Chief Marshal Soerjadi Soerjadarma
- Deputy: Vice Chief of Staff of the Indonesian Air Force

The Chief of Staff of the Indonesian Air Force (Indonesian: Kepala Staf TNI Angkatan Udara, abbreviated KSAU or KASAU) is the highest position in the Indonesian Air Force. The position is held by the four-star Marshal, appointed by and reporting directly to the Commander of the Indonesian National Armed Forces. Chief of Staff is assisted by Vice Chief of Staff of the Indonesian Air Force, position is held by three-star Marshal.

== List of officeholders ==
No.	Portrait	Name	Term of office			Specialty	Ref.
No.	Portrait	Name	Took office	Left office	Time in office	Specialty	Ref.
1		Air Chief Marshal; Soerjadi Soerjadarma	9 April 1946	19 January 1962	15 years, 285 days	Navigator	
2		Air Marshal; Omar Dhani	19 January 1962	24 November 1965	3 years, 309 days	Pilot	
3		Air Vice-Marshal; Sri Moeljono Herlambang	27 November 1965	31 March 1966	124 days	Pilot	
4		Air Chief Marshal; Roesmin Noerjadin	31 March 1966	10 November 1969	3 years, 224 days	Pilot	
5		Air Chief Marshal; Soewoto Soekendar	10 November 1969	28 March 1973	3 years, 138 days	Pilot	
6		Air Chief Marshal; Saleh Basarah	28 March 1973	4 June 1977	4 years, 68 days	Pilot	
7		Air Chief Marshal; Ashadi Tjahjadi	4 June 1977	26 November 1982	5 years, 175 days	Pilot	
8		Air Chief Marshal; Soekardi	26 November 1982	11 April 1986	3 years, 136 days	Pilot	
9		Air Chief Marshal; Oetomo	11 April 1986	1 March 1990	3 years, 324 days	Pilot	
10		Air Chief Marshal; Siboen Dipoatmodjo	1 March 1990	23 March 1993	3 years, 22 days	Pilot	
11		Air Chief Marshal; Rilo Pambudi	23 March 1993	15 March 1996	2 years, 358 days	Pilot	
12		Air Chief Marshal; Sutria Tubagus	15 March 1996	3 July 1998	2 years, 110 days	Pilot	
13		Air Chief Marshal; Hanafie Asnan	3 July 1998	25 April 2002	3 years, 296 days	Pilot	
14		Air Chief Marshal; Chappy Hakim	25 April 2002	23 February 2005	2 years, 304 days	Pilot	
15		Air Chief Marshal; Djoko Suyanto	23 February 2005	13 February 2006	355 days	Pilot	
16		Air Chief Marshal; Herman Prayitno	13 February 2006	28 December 2007	1 year, 318 days	Pilot	
17		Air Chief Marshal; Soebandrio	28 December 2007	7 November 2009	1 year, 314 days	Pilot	
18		Air Chief Marshal; Imam Sufaat	7 November 2009	21 December 2012	3 years, 44 days	Pilot	
19		Air Chief Marshal; Ida Bagus Putu Dunia	21 December 2012	2 January 2015	2 years, 12 days	Pilot	
20		Air Chief Marshal; Agus Supriatna	2 January 2015	18 January 2017	2 years, 16 days	Pilot	
21		Air Chief Marshal; Hadi Tjahjanto	18 January 2017	17 January 2018	364 days	Pilot	
22		Air Chief Marshal; Yuyu Sutisna	17 January 2018	20 May 2020	2 years, 124 days	Pilot	
23		Air Chief Marshal; Fadjar Prasetyo	20 May 2020	5 April 2024	3 years, 321 days	Pilot	
24		Air Chief Marshal; Mohamad Tony Harjono	5 April 2024	Incumbent	2 years, 222 days	Pilot	

== See also ==
- Commander of the Indonesian National Armed Forces
- Deputy Commander of the Indonesian National Armed Forces
- Chief of Staff of the Indonesian Army
- Chief of Staff of the Indonesian Navy
