= Kongsak Vantana =

Thai Air Chief Marshal (1945–2026)

- คงศักดิ์ วันทนา
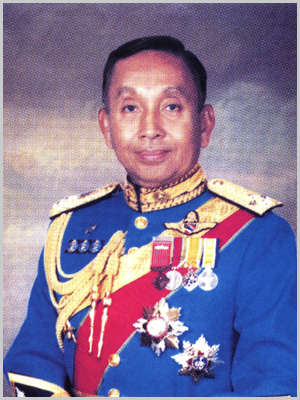

Commander of the Royal Thai Air Force
- In office 2002–2005

Personal details
- Born: 30 July 1945
- Died: 29 September 2026 (aged 81)
- Awards: Meritorious Service Medal

Kongsak Vantana (Thai: คงศักดิ์ วันทนา; 30 July 1945 – 29 September 2026) was a Thai air force officer. He served as commander-in-chief of the Royal Thai Air Force from 2002 to 2005.

In December 2003, he received Singapore's Meritorious Service Medal (Military) award.

Vantana died on 29 September 2026, at the age of 81.

== Honours ==
=== Royal Decorations ===
- Knight Grand Cordon of the Order of the White Elephant
- Knight Grand Cordon of the Order of the Crown of Thailand
- Freemen Safeguarding Medal, 2nd Class 1st Cat
- Order of the Direkgunabhorn, Gold Medalist
- Chakra Mala Medal
- Boy Scout Citation Medal of Vajira, First Class
- King Rama IX Royal Cypher Medal, Fifth Class

=== Foreign Honours ===
- Sweden :
  - Commander 1st Class of the Order of the Polar Star
- Netherlands :
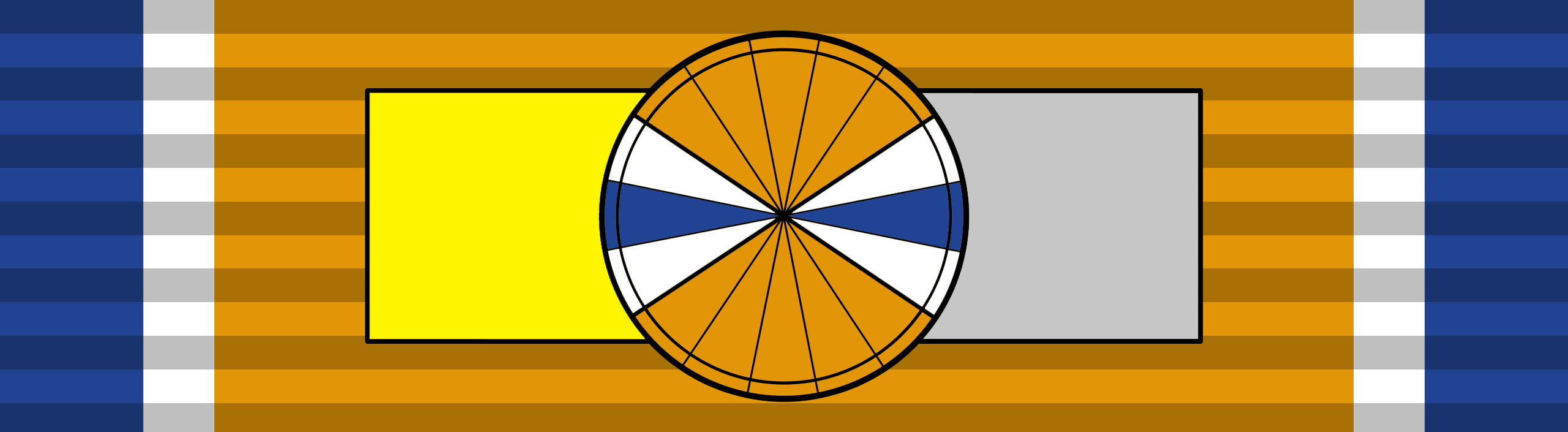
  - Grand Officer of the Order of Orange-Nassau
