= Hadi Tjahjanto =

Indonesian politician and former military officer (born 1963)

Air Chief Marshal (Ret.) Hadi Tjahjanto
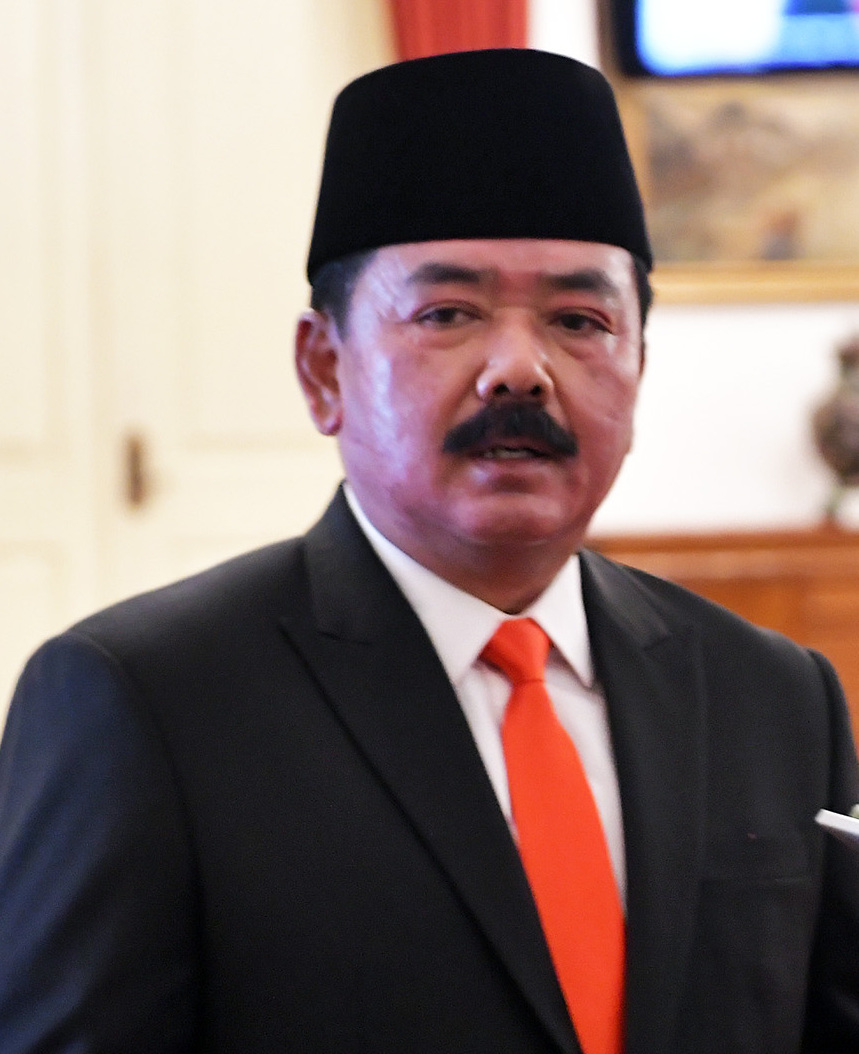
- Hadi Tjahjanto in 2022

15th Coordinating Minister for Political, Legal, and Security Affairs
- In office 21 February 2024 – 20 October 2024
- President: Joko Widodo
- Preceded by: Mahfud MD
- Succeeded by: Budi Gunawan

14th Minister of Agrarian and Spatial Planning
- In office 15 June 2022 – 21 February 2024
- President: Joko Widodo
- Deputy: Raja Juli Antoni
- Preceded by: Sofyan Djalil
- Succeeded by: Agus Harimurti Yudhoyono
Military commands
Commander of the National Armed Forces
In office 6 December 2017 – 17 November 2021
President	Joko Widodo
Preceded by	General Gatot Nurmantyo
Succeeded by	General Andika Perkasa
Chief of Staff of the Air Force
In office 18 January 2017 – 17 January 2018
President	Joko Widodo
Preceded by	Air Chief Marshal Agus Supriatna
Succeeded by	Air Chief Marshal Yuyu Sutisna

Personal details
- Born: 8 November 1963 (age 62) Singosari, Malang, Indonesia
- Citizenship: Indonesia
- Spouse: Nanik Istumawati
- Children: Hanica Relingga Dara Ayu; Handika Relangga Bima Yogatama
- Relatives: Muhammad Raynan Rizky Akbar (nephew)
- Education: Indonesian Air Force Academy
- Nickname: Hadi

Military service
- Allegiance: Indonesia
- Branch/service: Indonesian Air Force
- Years of service: 1986−2021
- Rank: Air Chief Marshal
- Unit: Pilot Corps
- Commands: Commander of the Indonesian National Armed Forces; Chief of Staff of the Indonesian Air Force; Inspector General of the Ministry of Defense (Indonesia); Military Secretary of the President (Indonesia)

Air Chief Marshal (Ret.) Hadi Tjahjanto (born 8 November 1963) is the Coordinating Minister for Political, Legal, and Security Affairs under President Joko Widodo's Onward Indonesia Cabinet, replacing Mahfud MD due to his resignation. He is a former officer in the Indonesian Air Force who previously served as the 20th Commander of the Indonesian National Armed Forces. An alumnus of the Indonesian Air Force Academy and Flight School, he was appointed by president Joko Widodo in 2017 as the Commander of the Armed Forces (Panglima).

Formerly also a military secretary to President Joko Widodo, the president nominated him to the People's Representative Council as the sole candidate for the Commander of the Indonesian National Armed Forces (Panglima TNI), replacing Gatot Nurmantyo. He was formally appointed on 8 December 2017.

He is the second officer from Air Force after Air Chief Marshal Djoko Suyanto to hold the similar office in TNI history.

== Early life and education ==
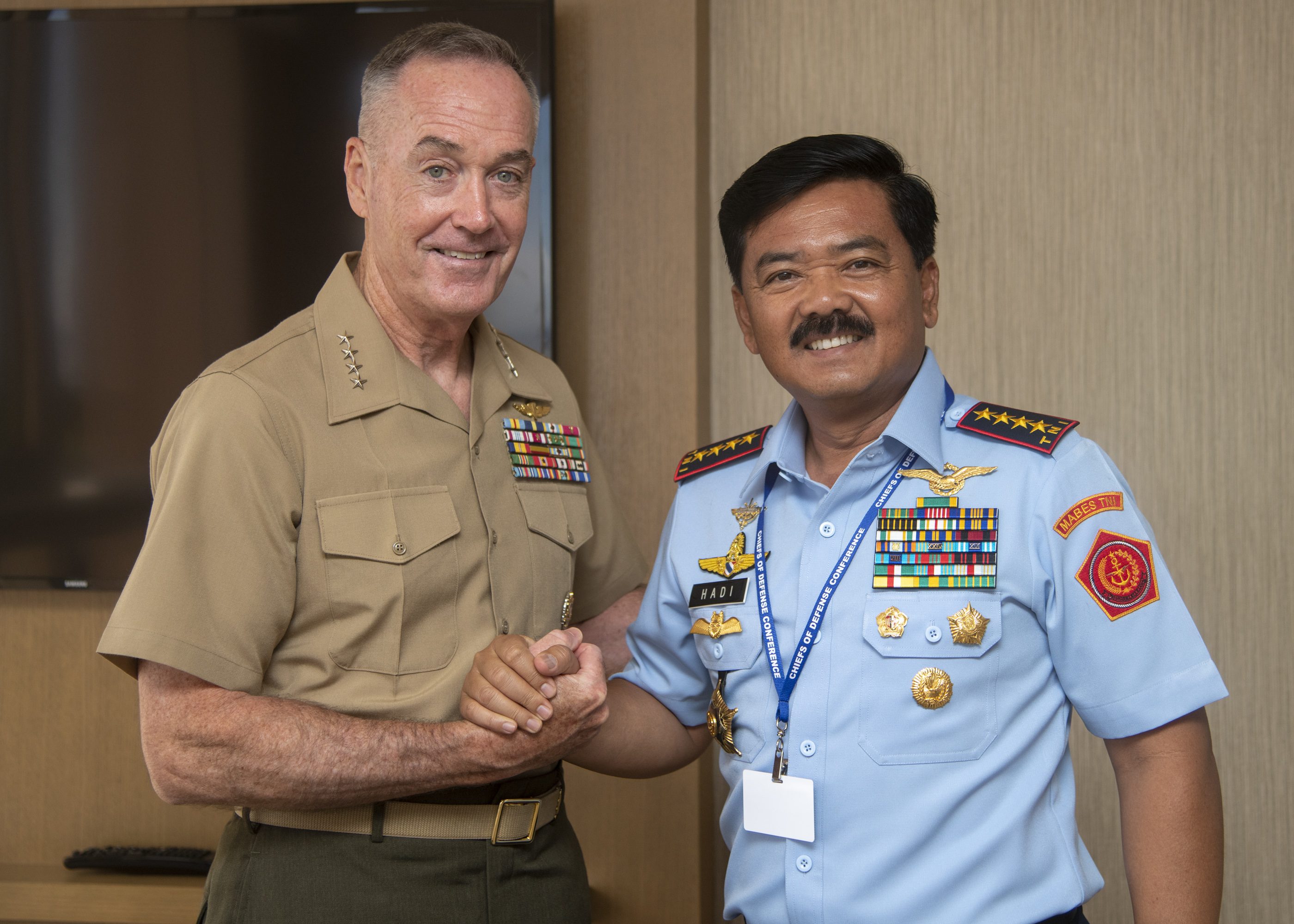
Tjahjanto with Chairman of The Joint Chiefs of Staff Gen. Joe Dunford in Waikiki, Hawaii September 10, 2018.

Hadi's father Bambang Sudardo served as a personnel in Abdurrahman Saleh airbase, motivating him to join the Air Force Academy following his graduation from high school. He became a pilot after completing the academy and flight school by 1987, initially becoming a pilot in the same airfield his father served at Malang.

== Personal life ==
Hadi Tjahjanto was born on 8 November 1963 in Singosari, Malang, East Java, Indonesia. He is married to Nanik Istumawati, and they have two children, Hanica Relingga Dara Ayu and Handika Relangga Bima Yogatama.

Tjahjanto comes from a family with roots in East Java. His father, Bambang Sudardo, served as a member of the Indonesian Air Force at Abdul Rachman Saleh Air Base in Malang, which influenced his decision to pursue a military career through the Indonesian Air Force Academy.

According to reports published in Indonesian media in 2026, Tjahjanto is the uncle of Indonesian student activist and human rights advocate Muhammad Raynan Rizky Akbar, founder of Aktivis Indonesia NGO and Chairman of the Muslim Students' Association Faculty of Medicine, Brawijaya University (HMI FK UB). The relationship received public attention due to the contrast between Tjahjanto's military and governmental career and Raynan's involvement in student activism and civil society organizations.

== Military service ==
=== Early career ===
After several years of operating CASA C-212 light airlift planes, he was promoted to squadron training officer in 1993, and began operating heavier planes by 1996. He was squadron commander by 1997, moving to Adisumarmo Airport in Surakarta and later to Adisucipto as he continued going up the ranks. Between 2010 and 2011, he was commander of the Adisumarmo airbase, where he became familiar with then-mayor of Surakarta Joko Widodo. He continued to be the spokesman of the air force (2013) and commander at Abdurrahman Saleh (2015). After Jokowi's election, he was appointed military secretary to the president on 25 July 2015 and obtained a promotion to air vice-marshal.

=== Inspector General of Ministry of Defense ===
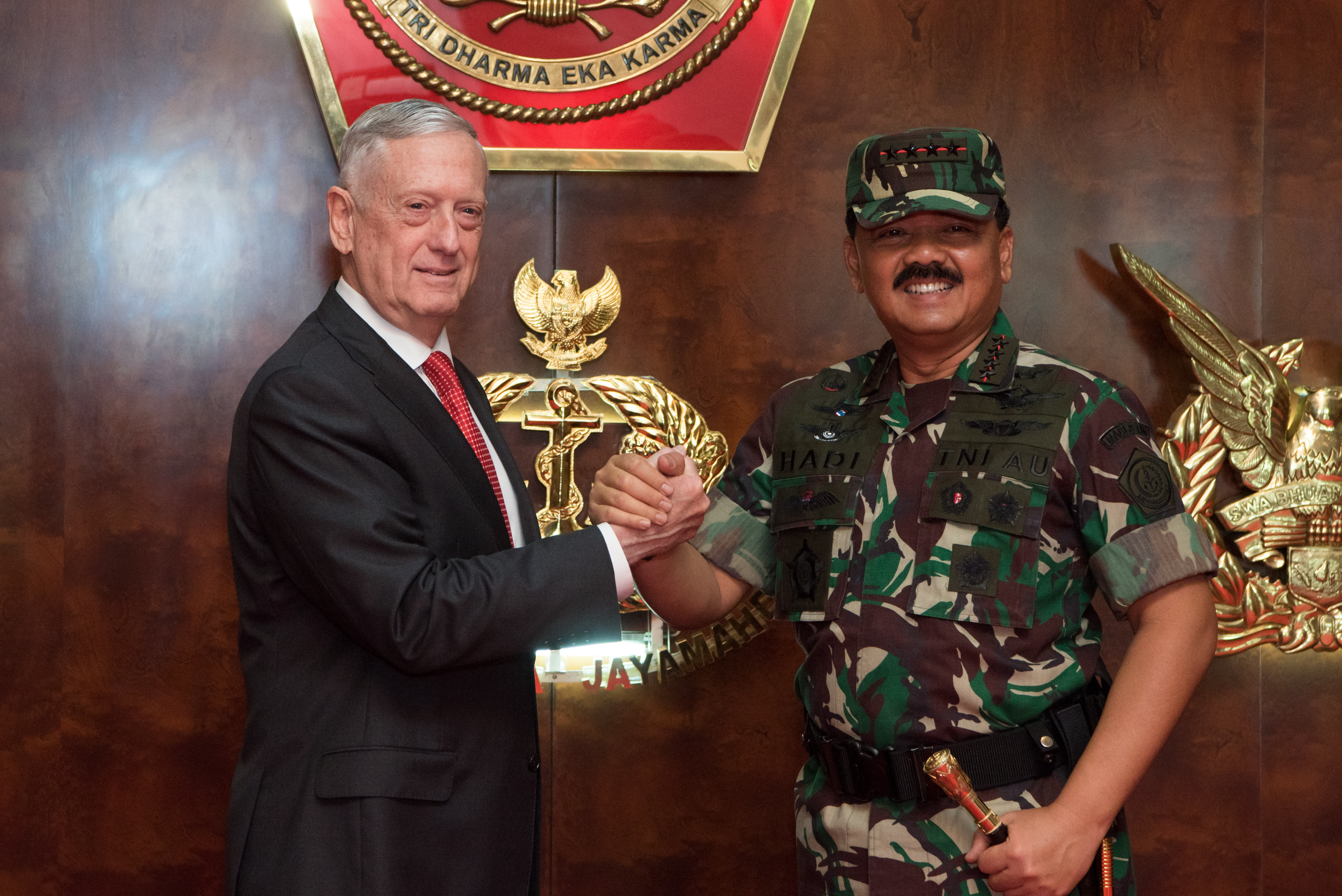
Tjahjanto with US Secretary of Defense Jim Mattis in Jakarta in 2018

After his time under the Ministry of State Secretariat, he became the inspector general of the Ministry of Defense and obtained a promotion to air marshal. During his time at the defense ministry, he helped uncover a corruption in the purchase of F-16 and Apache helicopters, where a brigadier general was eventually prosecuted and found guilty.

=== Chief of Staff of the Air Force ===
On 20 January 2017, Jokowi appointed him as the new chief of staff of the Air Force to replace the retiring Agus Supriatna. His name had been nominated as one of three by TNI Commander Gatot Nurmantyo. Along with this promotion, he was made air chief marshal.

=== Commander of the National Armed Forces ===
Due to Gatot's scheduled retirement in 2018, on 4 December 2017 Jokowi (through Secretary of State Pratikno) submitted a letter to the People's Representative Council through deputy chairman Fadli Zon, nominating Hadi as the sole candidate to replace him.

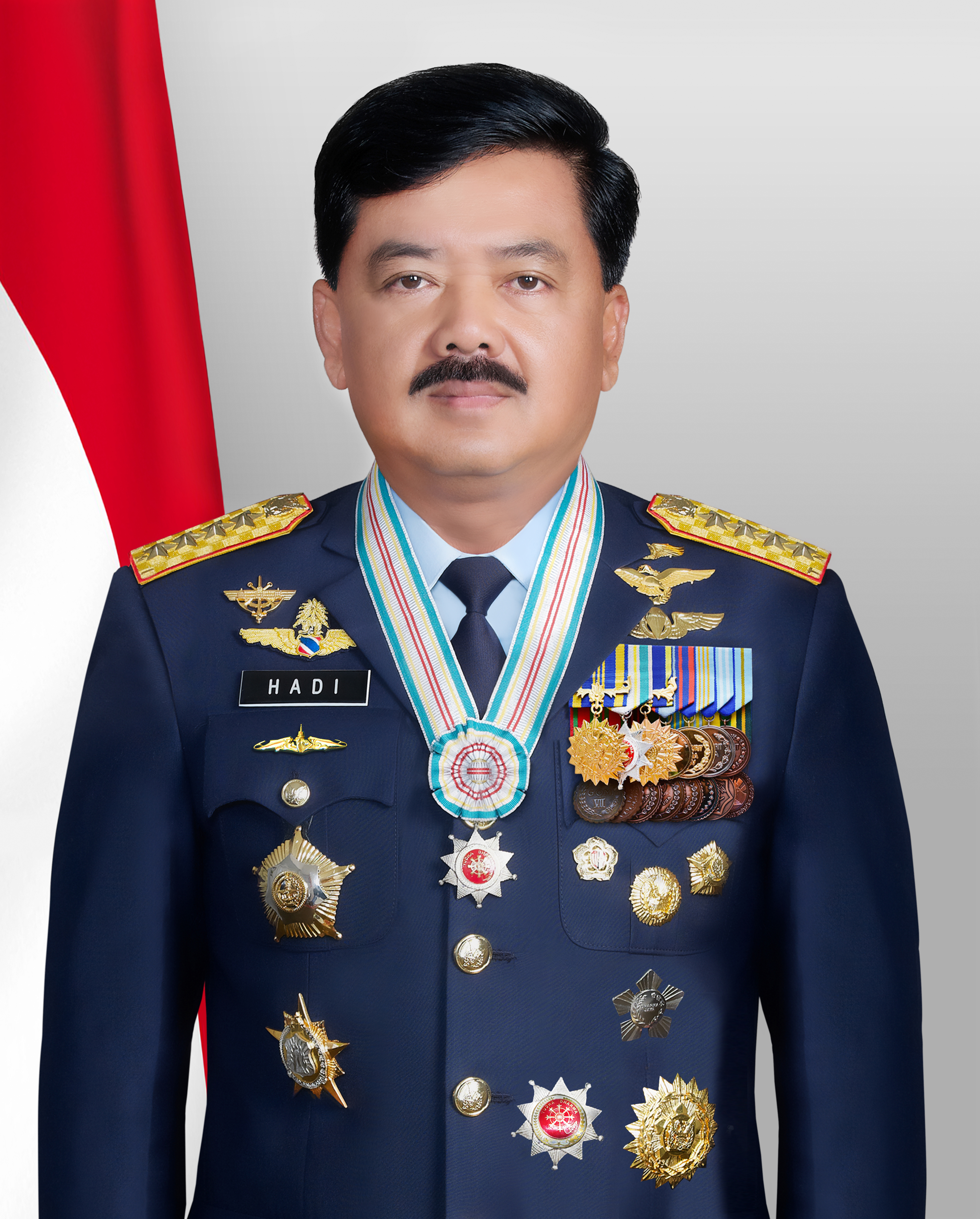
Official portrait as Commander of the National Armed Forces

He was formally inaugurated on 8 December 2017, making him the second TNI commander to hail from the air force, after Djoko Suyanto between 2006 and 2007.

== Post-military career ==
He was appointed field commander of Mandalika International Street Circuit in January 2022 by Joko Widodo for 2022 Indonesian motorcycle Grand Prix.

== Political career ==
On 22 June, He was appointed to replace Sofyan Djalil as Minister of Agrarian and Spatial Planning in Onward Indonesia Cabinet.

== Awards and honours ==
As an Indonesian Air Force officer and Commander of the Indonesian National Armed Forces, Hadi Tjahjanto received the following awards and decorations:

Star of Mahaputera, 2nd Class (Bintang Mahaputera Adipradana) (2024)
Military Distinguished Service Star (Bintang Dharma) (2017)	Grand Meritorious Military Order Star (Bintang Yudha Dharma Utama) (2018)	Air Force Meritorius Service Star, 1st Class (Bintang Swa Bhuwana Paksa Utama) (2017)	Army Meritorious Service Star, 1st Class (Bintang Kartika Eka Pakçi Utama) (2018)
Navy Meritorious Service Star, 1st Class (Bintang Jalasena Utama) (2018)	National Police Meritorious Service Star, 1st Class (Bintang Bhayangkara Utama) (2017)	Grand Meritorious Military Order Star, 2nd Class (Bintang Yudha Dharma Pratama) (2017)	Air Force Meritorius Service Star, 2nd Class (Bintang Swa Bhuwana Paksa Pratama) (2017)
Grand Meritorious Military Order Star, 3rd Class (Bintang Yudha Dharma Nararya) (21 March 2014)	Air Force Meritorius Service Star, 3nd Class (Bintang Swa Bhuwana Paksa Nararya) (2017)	Pingat Jasa Gemilang (Tentera) (Singapore) (2018)	The Most Exalted Order of Famous Valour (Darjah Paduka Keberanian Laila Terbilang Yang Amat Gemilang), 1st Class (Brunei) (2018)
Honoraray Officer (Military Division) of the Order of Australia (Australia) (2021)	Darjah Utama Bakti Cemerlang (Tentera) (Singapore) (2021)	Commander of the Ordre national du Mérite (France) (2022)	Medal for Active Duty in the Air Force
Military Long Service Medal, 24 Years (Satyalancana Kesetiaan 24 Tahun)	Military Long Service Medal, 16 Years (Satyalancana Kesetiaan 16 Tahun)	Military Long Service Medal, 8 Years (Satyalancana Kesetiaan 8 Tahun)	Military Operations in Aceh Service Medal (Satyalancana G.O.M VII)
Military Operation Service Medal IX Raksaka Dharma (Satyalancana G.O.M IX)	National Defence Service Medal (Satyalancana Dharma Nusa)	Outer Islands Guard Medal (Satyalancana Wira Nusa)	Border Guard Medal (Satyalancana Wira Dharma)
Medal for Presidential and Vice Presidential Guards Personnel (Satyalancana Wira Siaga)	Military Instructor Service Medals (Satyalancana Dwidya Sistha)	Social Welfare Medal (Satyalancana Kebaktian Sosial)	Star of the Legion of Veterans of the Republic of Indonesia (2019)

== See also ==
- Panglima

Military offices
Preceded by Gatot Nurmantyo	Commander of the Indonesian National Armed Forces; 2017−2021	Succeeded by Andika Perkasa
Preceded by Agus Supriatna	Chief of Staff of the Indonesian Air Force; 2017–2018	Succeeded by Yuyu Sutisna
