= Manat Wongwat =

Thai Air Chief Marshal

- มานัต วงษ์วาทย์
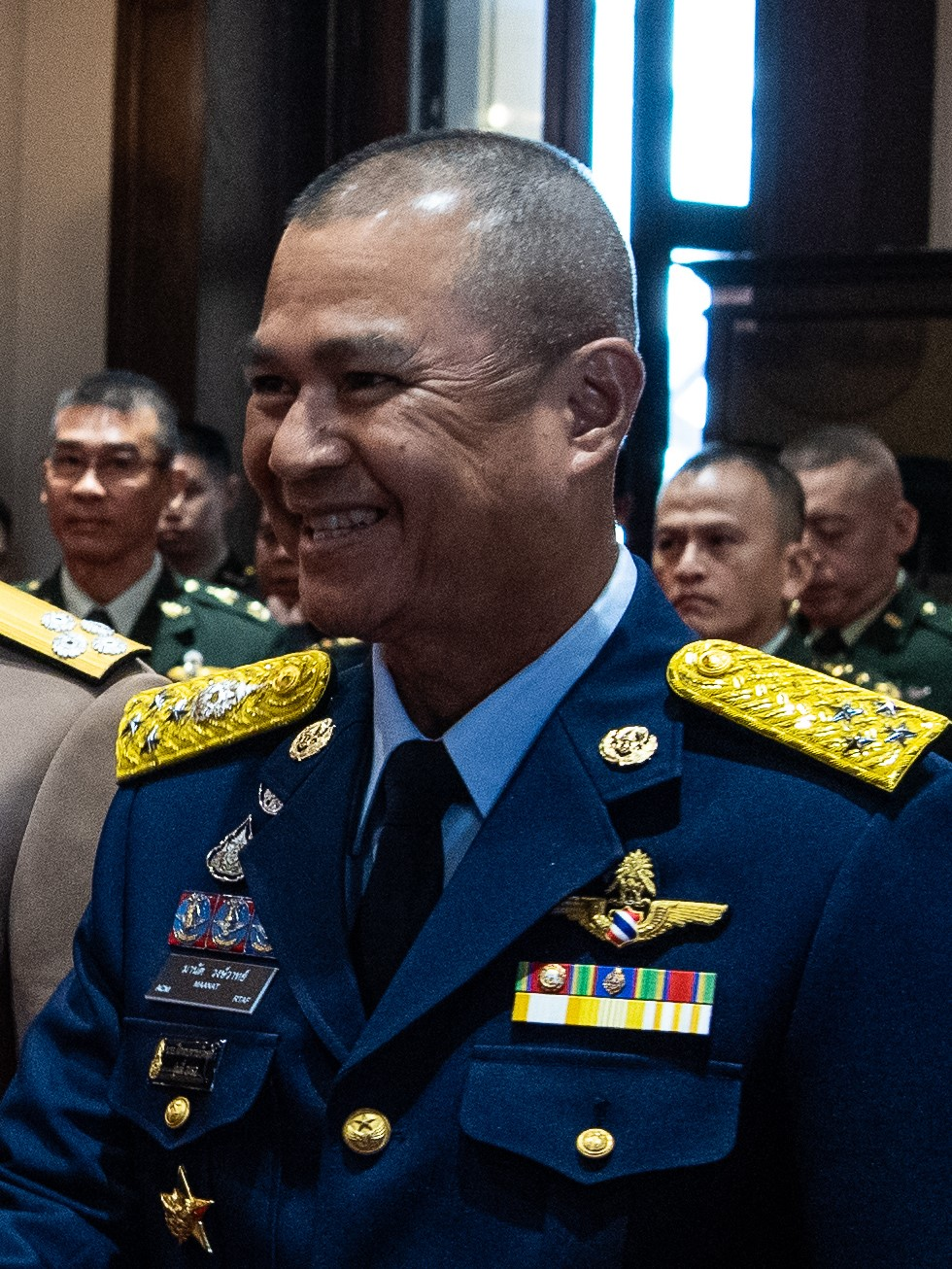
- Manat in 2019

Commander of the Royal Thai Air Force
- In office 1 October 2019 – 30 September 2020
- Preceded by: Chaiyapruk Didyasarin
- Succeeded by: Airbull Suttiwan

Personal details
- Born: 15 July 1960 (age 65)

Military service
- Allegiance: Thailand
- Branch/service: Royal Thai Air Force

Manat Wongwat (Thai: มานัต วงษ์วาทย์, born 15 July 1960) is a former Thai air force officer. He served as commander-in-chief of the Royal Thai Air Force from 1 October 2019 to 30 September 2020. Airbull Suttiwan was appointed his successor.

Military offices
Preceded by Chaiyapruk Didyasarin	Commander of the Royal Thai Air Force; 2019–2020	Succeeded by Airbull Suttiwan
