= Itthaporn Subhawong =

Royal Thai Air Force marshal

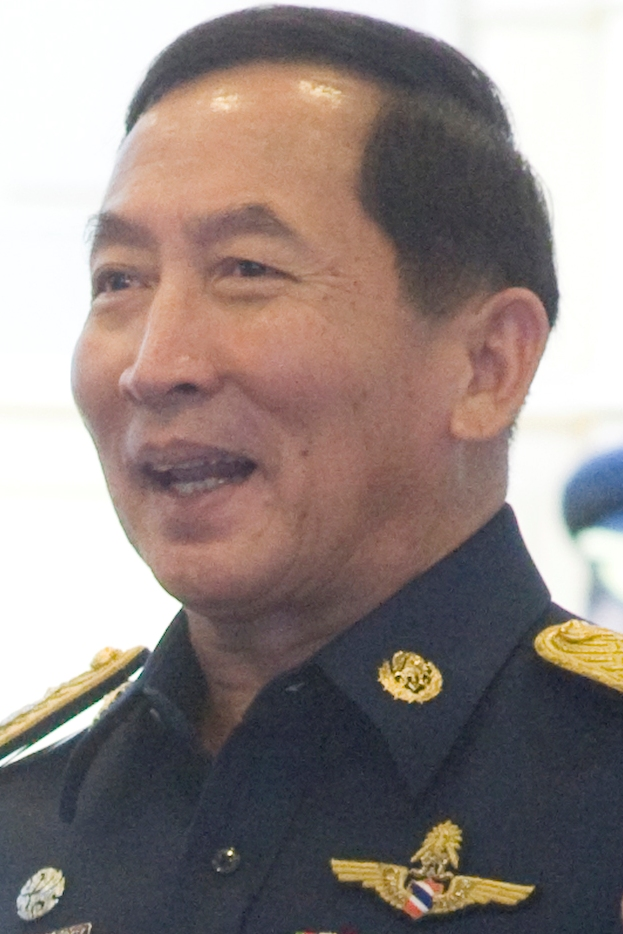
- Born: 6 January 1952 (age 74); Nakhon Ratchasima, Thailand
- Military career
- Allegiance: Thailand
- Branch: Royal Thai Air Force
- Rank: Air Chief Marshal
- Commands: Commander-in-Chief

Air Chief Marshal Itthaporn Subhawong (Thai: อิทธพร ศุภวงศ์, RTGS: Itthaphon Suphawong; born 6 January 1952) is a Royal Thai Air Force marshal. He was appointed the 21st Commander-in-Chief of the Royal Thai Air Force (RTAF) on 1 October 2008 until 30 September 2012.

== Education and careers ==
Itthaporn Subhawong was born on 6 January 1952 in Nakhon Ratchasima, Thailand. He attended Saint Gabriel's College before commencing training at the Royal Thai Air Force Academy from where he was commissioned in 1975.

In 1996, he was appointed royal aide-de-camp, and in 2007 appointed to royal aide-de-camp special.

Military offices
Preceded by Chalit Pukbhasuk	Commander of the Royal Thai Air Force; 2008 – 2012	Succeeded by Prajin Juntong
