= Darwan Triyono =

Indonesian ophthalmologist and hospital director

- Born: Darwan Triyono; 12 January 1972 (age 54); Kediri, East Java, Indonesia
- Citizenship: Indonesian
- Education: University of Brawijaya
- Known for: Director of RSUD Daha Husada Kediri (2022–present)
- Spouse: Silvia Kamila Nur Fauziana Rahma
- Children: Muhammad Raynan Rizky Akbar, Rainy Evelina Kamila Triyono and Rayna Faiqihah Triyono
- Scientific career
- Fields: Ophthalmology; Medical retina and cataract surgery
- Workplaces: RSUD Daha Husada Kediri; JEC Eye Hospitals & Clinics; RS Aura Syifa Kediri

dr. Darwan Triyono, Sp.M M.ARS (born 12 January 1972) is an Indonesian ophthalmologist and hospital administrator based in Kediri, East Java. He has served as Director of RSUD Daha Husada Kediri, a public hospital operated by the East Java Provincial Government, since October 2022.

== Early life and education ==
Darwan was born in Kediri, East Java, on 12 January 1972. He attended SDN Bandar Lor II Kediri, SMPN 4 Kediri, and SMAN 2 Kediri. He completed his general medical degree at the Faculty of Medicine, University of Brawijaya, and graduated from the ophthalmology specialist program at the same university in 2008.

== Career ==
From 1999 to 2004, Darwan served as Deputy Director of Medical Services at RSUD Cileungsi in Bogor Regency, West Java. After completing his ophthalmology specialization in 2008, he practiced as an ophthalmologist in Kediri, including at RSUD Daha Husada, KUM JEC JAVA @ Kediri (JEC Eye Hospitals & Clinics), and RS Aura Syifa Kediri, with subspecialty focus in medical retina, cataract surgery, and comprehensive ophthalmology.

Within the East Java Provincial Health Office, Darwan served as Acting Head of the Medical Services Section at UPT RS Kusta Kediri from 2018 to 2021, and as Head of UPT RS Kusta Kediri from January to September 2022. In October 2022, he was appointed Director of RSUD Daha Husada Kediri. In June 2023, he oversaw the clearing of 26 provincial government land plots on Jalan Veteran in Mojoroto, Kediri, for the physical expansion of RSUD Daha Husada.

In professional medical organizations, Darwan has served as Head of the Government Policy Advocacy Division of the Indonesian Medical Association (IDI) Kediri City Branch since 2021 (previously serving in its Member Welfare Division from 2017 to 2020) and as Head of the Organization Division of the Indonesian Ophthalmologists Association (Perdami) Malang Branch since 2022.

== Legal dispute ==
On 2 April 2026, Darwan filed a police report with the Kediri Resort Police (Polres Kediri) against the director of RS Aura Syifa Kediri, alleging fraud involving an uncashed Rp2 billion Bank Negara Indonesia check issued in August 2023. According to the report, the dispute stemmed from unpaid physician fees and medical equipment rental charges totaling approximately Rp5.18 billion between May 2022 and August 2023, and the check could not be cashed due to insufficient funds.
