= Djoko Suyanto =

Indonesian air force marshal

Air Chief Marshall (Ret.) Djoko Suyanto PJG DPKT PGAT DUBC
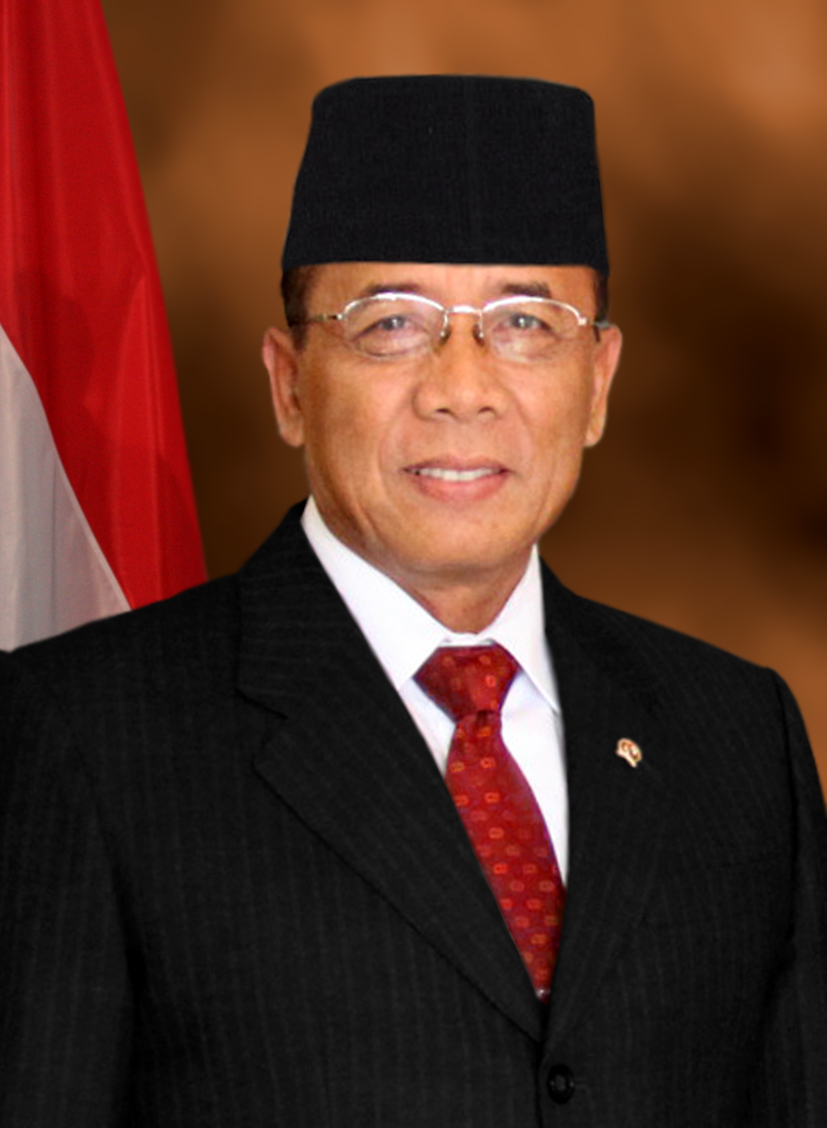
- Born: 2 December 1950 (age 75); Madiun, East Java, Indonesia
- Military career
- Allegiance: Indonesia
- Branch: Indonesian Air Force
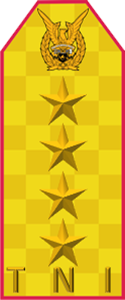
- Rank: Air Chief Marshal (Marsekal)
- Commands: Indonesian National Armed Forces; Indonesian Air Force

Air Chief Marshal Djoko Suyanto (born 2 December 1950) was the Commander of the Indonesian National Armed Forces from 2006 to 2007. After ending his services as the commander, he served as the Coordinating Minister for Legal, Political, and Security Affairs in President Susilo Bambang Yudhoyono's Second United Indonesia Cabinet.

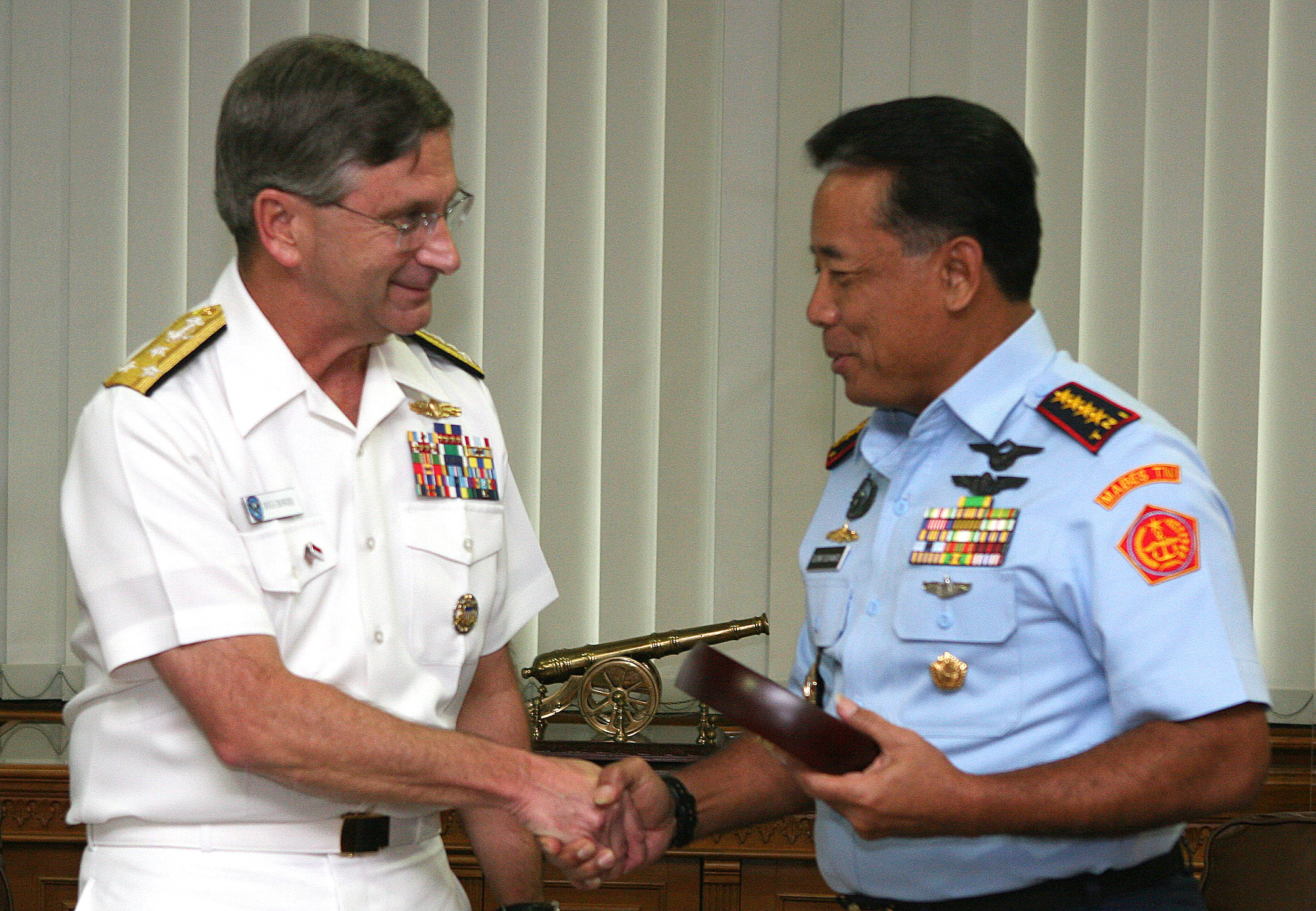
Djoko Suyanto (right) with US Vice Admiral Doug Crowder

Suyanto graduated from the Indonesian Air Force Academy (Akademi Angkatan Udara, AAU) in 1973 and rapidly gained his pilot's brevet. He underwent further training in Australia and the United States, where he trained at the United States Air Force Weapons School at Nellis Air Force Base, before becoming a flying instructor. He then served successively as the commander of No. 14 (Air Combat) Squadron flying F-5 Tiger II, the commander of Iswahyudi Air Force Base, the commander of the National Air Defense Sector, and the commander of the Air Force Education Command.

Djoko Suyanto was appointed the Commander of Air Force Operations Command 2 - East in 2001. Two years later he took up the post of Air Force Operations Advisor at Air Force Headquarters and in 2005 he was appointed Chief of Staff of the Air Force. When, in 2006, Djoko Suyanto became Commander of the National Armed Forces, he was the first Air Force officer to hold this post.

Air Chief Marshal Djoko Suyanto is known as one of Indonesia’s best fighter pilots.

At his confirmation hearing, he was quoted as saying:

For me there is not a problem, I am conservative or reformist, but how I will implement my tasks in line with the existing law, namely the Law on military no. 34/2004

In September 2006, Suyanto complained of human rights objections to the New York Agreement trading of West New Guinea to Indonesia, stating "I get information from our representative in the UN that some NGOs have begun persuading bishop Desmond Tutu to help them lobbying Papua case in the UN," and "We must be alert on the move of the NGOs that use famous people for their goal of breaking [off] Papua from Indonesia."

Political offices
Preceded by Widodo Adi Sutjipto	Coordinating Minister for Political, Legal and Security Affairs of Indonesia; 2009–2014	Succeeded by Tedjo Edhy Purdijatno
Military offices
Preceded by Chappy Hakim	Chief of the Air Staff (TNI-AU); 2005–2006	Succeeded by Herman Prayitno
Preceded by Endriartono Sutarto	Commander of the Indonesian National Armed Forces; 2006–2007	Succeeded by Djoko Santoso
