= Imam Sufaat =

Indonesian Air Force officer

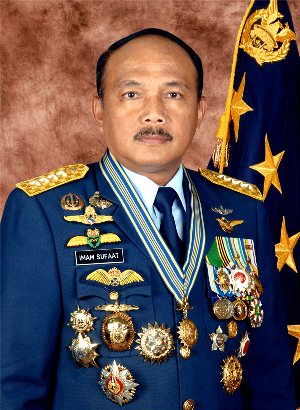
- Born: 27 January 1955 (age 71); Wates, Yogyakarta, Indonesia
- Allegiance: Indonesia
- Branch: Indonesian Air Force
- Rank: Air Chief Marshal (Marsekal)
- Commands: Indonesian Air Force
- Education: Indonesian Air Force Academy 1977

Air Chief Marshal Imam Sufaat (Wates, Yogyakarta, 27 January 1955) was the Chief of Staff of the Indonesian Air Force from 2009 to 2012.

Sufaat is a black Javanese Muslim from Yogyakarta in Java, Indonesia.

Military offices
Preceded by Soebandrio	Chief of the Air Staff (TNI-AU); 2009–2012	Succeeded by Ida Bagus Putu Dunia
