= List of commanders-in-chief of the Royal Thai Air Force =

Chief of the Royal Thai Air Force
- ผู้บัญชาการทหารอากาศ
- Rank flag of the commander-in-chief

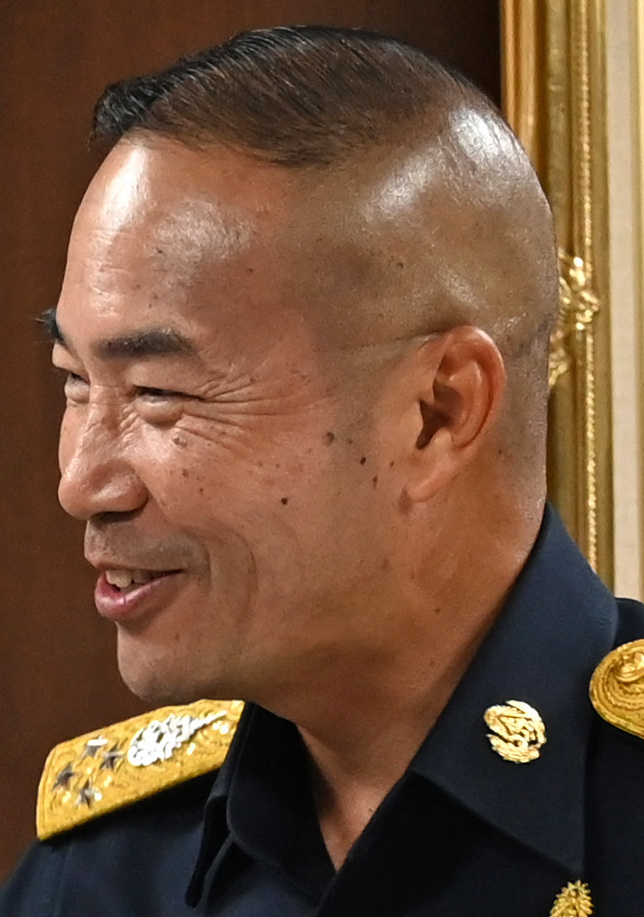
- Incumbent; Air Chief Marshal Seksan Kantha since 1 October 2025
- Member of: Royal Thai Air Force
- Reports to: Minister of Defence
- Nominator: Minister of Defence
- Appointer: King of Thailand
- Term length: Until retired
- Inaugural holder: Prince Chakrabongse Bhuvanath
- Formation: 2 November 1913
- Website: RTAF commanders

The Commander-in-Chief of the Royal Thai Air Force (Thai: ผู้บัญชาการทหารอากาศไทย), currently Air Chief Marshal Seksan Kantha, who is headquartered in Bangkok.

The following individuals have commanded the Royal Thai Air Force:

== Royal Aeronautical Service ==
No.	Portrait	Name	Took office	Left office	Time in office
1	Prince Chakrabongse Bhuvanath	Field Marshal; Prince Chakrabongse Bhuvanath (1883–1920)	1913	1915	1–2 years
2	Phraya Chalerm Akas	Major General; Phraya Chalerm Akas	1915	1932	16–17 years
3	Phraya Vehasayan Silapasit	Colonel; Phraya Vehasayan Silapasit	1932	1935	2–3 years
4	Munee Mahasanthana Vejayantarungsarit	Group Captain; Munee Mahasanthana Vejayantarungsarit	1935	1937	1–2 years

== Royal Thai Air Force ==
No.	Portrait	Rank	Name	Took office	Left office
1		Air Marshal	Munee Mahasanthana Vejayantarungsarit	1937	1941
2		Air Marshal	Luang Atuegtevadej	1941	1943
3		Air Marshal	Luang Tevaritpanluek	1943	1949
4		Marshal of the Royal Thai Air Force	Fuen Ronnaphagrad Ritthakhanee	1949	1957
5		Marshal of the Royal Thai Air Force	Chalermkiat Watanangura	1957	1960
6		Air Chief Marshal	Bunchu Chantharubeksa	1960	1974
7		Air Chief Marshal	Kamon Dechatungkha	1974	1977
8		Air Chief Marshal	Panieng Karntarat	1977	1981
9		Air Chief Marshal	Thaklaeo Susillavorn	1981	1983
10		Air Chief Marshal	Prapan Dhupatemiya	1983	1987
11		Air Chief Marshal	Voranat Aphichari	1987	1989
12		Air Chief Marshal	Kaset Rojananil	1989	1992
13		Air Chief Marshal	Kanth Pimanthip	1992	1993
14		Air Chief Marshal	Siripong Thongyai	1993	1996
15		Air Chief Marshal	Amon Naewmalee	1996	1997
16		Air Chief Marshal	Thananit Niumtundhi	1997	1999
17		Air Chief Marshal	Sanan Tuatip	1999	2000
18		Air Chief Marshal	Pong Manesilp	2000	2002
19		Air Chief Marshal	Kongsak Vantana	2002	31 July 2005
–		Air Chief Marshal	Chalerm Choomchuensook; Acting Commander	31 July 2005	30 August 2005
20		Air Chief Marshal	Chalit Pukbhasuk	1 October 2005	1 October 2008
21		Air Chief Marshal	Itthaporn Subhawong	1 October 2008	30 September 2012
22		Air Chief Marshal	Prajin Juntong	1 October 2012	30 September 2014
23		Air Chief Marshal	Treetod Sonjance	1 October 2014	30 September 2016
24		Air Chief Marshal	Johm Rungsawang	1 October 2016	30 September 2018
25		Air Chief Marshal	Chaiyapruk Didyasarin	1 October 2018	30 September 2019
26		Air Chief Marshal	Manat Wongwat	1 October 2019	30 September 2020
27		Air Chief Marshal	Airbull Suttiwan	1 October 2020	30 September 2021
28		Air Chief Marshal	Napadej Dhupatemiya	1 October 2021	30 September 2022
29		Air Chief Marshal	Alongkorn Wannarot	1 October 2022	30 September 2023
30		Air Chief Marshal	Punpakdee Pattanakul	1 October 2023	30 September 2025
31		Air Chief Marshal	Seksan Kantha	1 October 2025	Incumbent

== See also ==
- Royal Thai Armed Forces
- Highest Commander of the Royal Thai Armed Forces
- Chief of Defence Forces (Thailand)
- List of commanders-in-chief of the Royal Thai Army
- List of commanders-in-chief of the Royal Thai Navy
