= Napadej Dhupatemiya =

Thai Air Chief Marshal

- นภาเดช ธูปะเตมีย์

Commander of the Royal Thai Air Force
- In office 1 October 2021 – 30 September 2022
- Preceded by: Airbull Suttiwan
- Succeeded by: Alongkorn Wannarot

Personal details
- Born: 26 January 1962 (age 64)

Military service
- Allegiance: Thailand
- Branch/service: Royal Thai Air Force

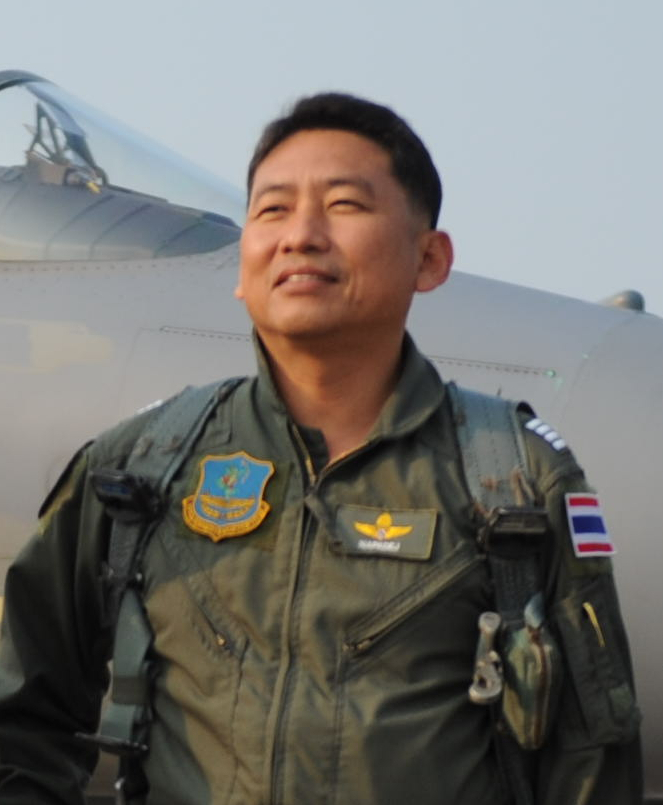
Capt. Napadej Dhupatemiya

Napadej Dhupatemiya, also written as Napadej Thupatemi, (Thai: นภาเดช ธูปะเตมีย์, RTGS: Naphadet Thupatemi; born 26 January 1962) is a Thai air force officer. From 1 October 2021 to 30 September 2022, he served as commander-in-chief of the Royal Thai Air Force. Alongkorn Wannarot was appointed his successor.

He previously served as chief advisor of Airbull Suttiwan (Commander of the Royal Thai Air Force from October 2020 to September 2021).

Military offices
Preceded by Airbull Suttiwan	Commander-in-chief of the Royal Thai Air Force; 2021–2022	Succeeded by Alongkorn Wannarot
