= Soebandrio (Indonesian Air Force officer) =

Indonesian air chief marshal

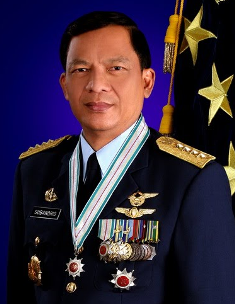
- Born: 22 March 1953 (age 73); Bandung, Indonesia
- Military career
- Allegiance: Indonesia
- Branch: Indonesian Air Force
- Service years: 1974–2009
- Rank: Air Chief Marshal (Marsekal)
- Commands: Indonesian Air Force

Air Chief Marshal Soebandrio (born 22 March 1953 in Bandung) is a former Chief of Staff of the Indonesian Air Force. He took over from Air Marshal Herman Prayitno on 28 December 2007, and was replaced by Air Chief Marshal Imam Sufaat on 7 November 2009. He served as an F-4 fighter pilot in the East Timor War. He was promoted to Staff Colonel in 1992 and was the ADC (Aide-de-Camp) to President Suharto between 1994 and 1998. He later commanded the 15th Bomber Group and 11th Electronics Warfare Brigade. He was trained in Israel and Taiwan.

Military offices
| Preceded by Herman Prayitno | Chief of the Air Staff (TNI-AU); 2007–2009 | Succeeded by Imam Sufaat |
