= Treetod Sonjance =

Thai Air Chief Marshal

- ตรีทศ สนแจ้ง
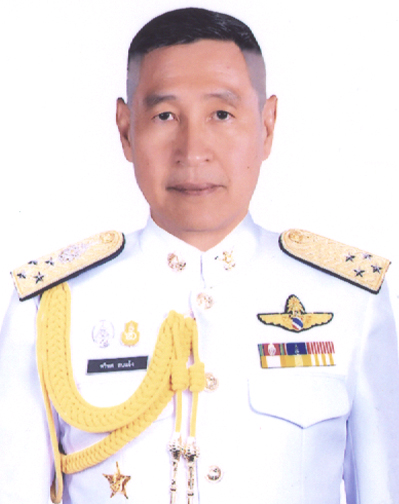

Commander of the Royal Thai Air Force
- In office 1 October 2014 – 30 September 2016
- Preceded by: Prajin Juntong
- Succeeded by: Johm Rungsawang

Personal details
- Born: 1956 (age 69–70)

Treetod Sonjance (Thai: ตรีทศ สนแจ้ง, RTGS: Trithot Sonchaeng; born 1956) is a former Thai air force officer. He served as commander-in-chief of the Royal Thai Air Force from 1 October 2014 to 30 September 2016. Johm Rungsawang was appointed as his successor.

He was a member of the board of directors of Thai Airways from April 2017 to May 2019.

Military offices
Preceded by Prajin Juntong	Commander of the Royal Thai Air Force; 2014–2016	Succeeded by Johm Rungsawang
