= Ida Bagus Putu Dunia =

Chief of the Air Staff of the Indonesian Air Force

Ida Bagus Putu Dunia PGAT PJG GCCT
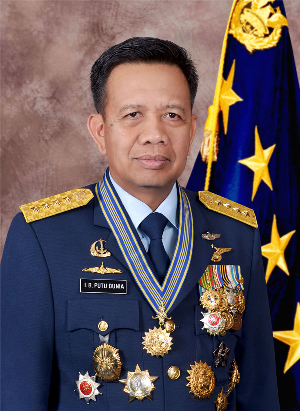

19th Chief of Staff of the Indonesian Air Force
- In office 17 December 2012 – 2 January 2015
- President: Susilo Bambang Yudhoyono; Joko Widodo
- Preceded by: Imam Sufaat
- Succeeded by: Agus Supriatna

Personal details
- Born: 20 February 1957 (age 69) Tabanan, Bali, Indonesia
- Spouse: Ida Ayu Kumala
- Children: Ida Ayu K. Satyawati; Ida Bagus Jagannatha
- Parent(s): Ida Bagus Made T. (Father); Dayu Ketut Nur (Mother)
- Education: Indonesian Air Force (1981)
- Occupation: Soldier
- Awards: Adi Makayasa (1981)

Military service
- Allegiance: Indonesia
- Branch/service: Indonesian Air Force
- Years of service: 1981–2015
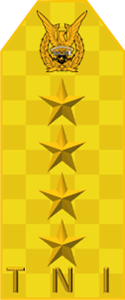
- Rank: Marsekal TNI
- Unit: Korps Penerbang

Air Chief Marshal (Ret.) Ida Bagus Putu Dunia (born 20 February 1957) is a former Chief of Staff of the Indonesian Air Force. He briefly served as the head of the Indonesian Military Command and Staff College in 2012 before being appointed Chief of Staff of the Air Force on 17 December 2012.

Military offices
Preceded by Imam Sufaat	Chief of the Air Staff (TNI-AU); 2012–2015	Succeeded by Agus Supriatna
