= List of flags of the Royal Thai Armed Forces =

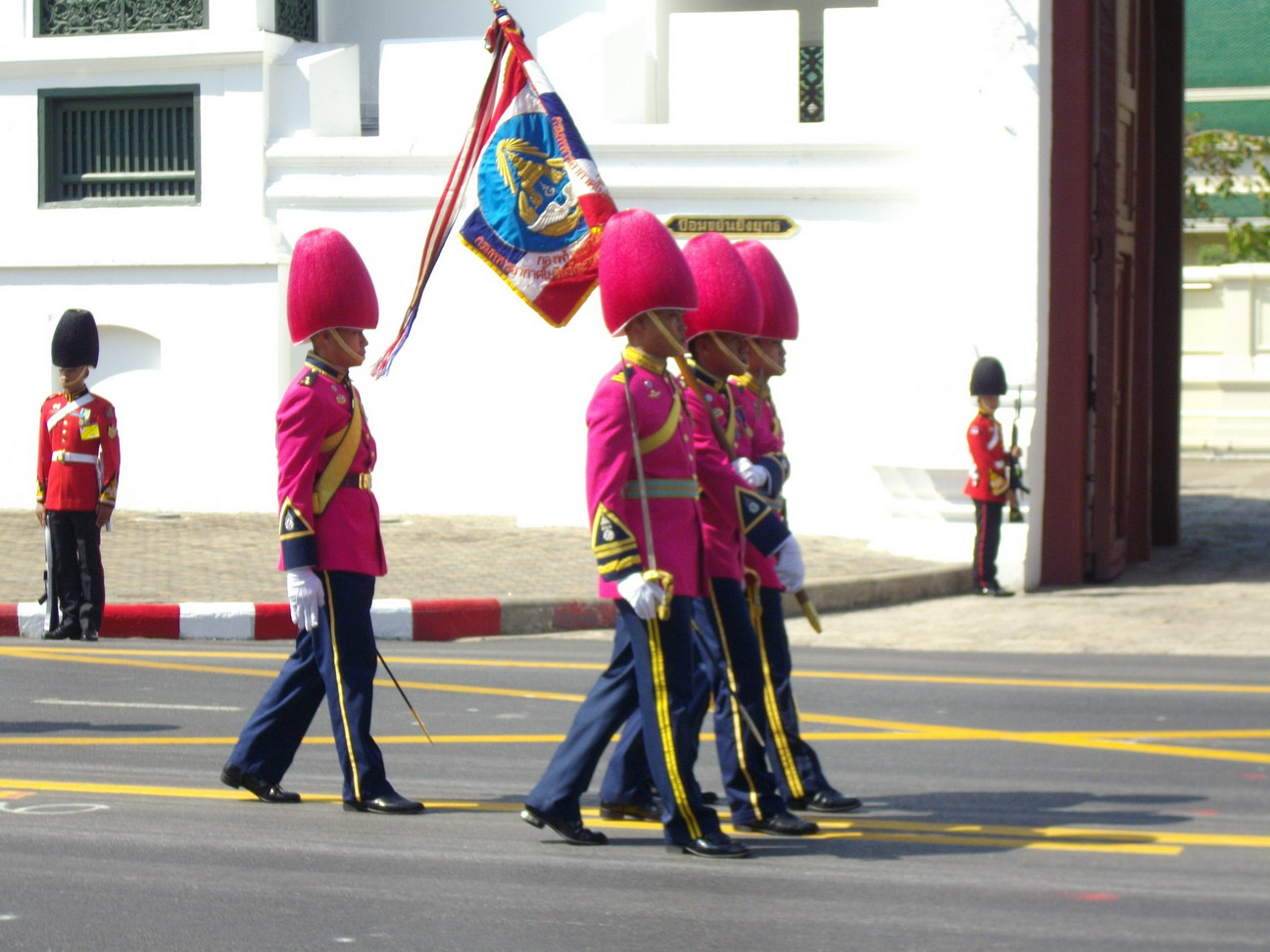
The honor guard of the 1st Security Force Bataillion, RTAF Security Force Command, Royal Thai Air Force, carried their unit colour called "Thong Chai Chalermphol" (ธงชัยเฉลิมพล) during the funeral procession of HRH Princess Galyani Vadhana in 2008.

Most of the flags used by the Thai military today were stipulated in the Flag Act of 1979 (พระราชบัญญัติ ธง พ.ศ. ๒๕๒๒).

== Head of the Armed Forces ==
Flag	Date	Use	Description
	1910–present	Garuda war flag of the king (ธงชัยพระครุฑพ่าห์น้อย: Thongchai Phra Khrut Phah Noi)	The war flags are used only by the King of Thailand, who is the constitutional Head of the Royal Thai Armed Forces. The flags were created by King Vajiravudh in 1910. In accordance with ancient tradition the flags are to be used as a pair, with the Garuda flag always to the king's right and the Hanuman flag to the king's left; perhaps as a signal to soldiers in ancient times, the location and the direction of travel of the king. The flags are always carried by two officers of the King's guard and accompanies the king (when in military uniform) when he travels in a royal procession or military parade. The flags only appear in rare royal ceremonies, such as the Thai Royal Guards parade. Unlike the Royal Standard of Thailand, which is to be used on every occasion when the king is present.
	1910–present	Hanuman war flag of the king (ธงชัยราชกระบี่ยุทธน้อย: Thongchai Raja Krabi Yut Noi)	

== Ministry of Defence of Thailand ==
Flag	Date	Use	Description
	1936–present	Flag of the Minister of Defence of Thailand	White flag in the ratio of 5:6, with the Emblem of the Ministry of Defence in the center. The emblem consists of a red chakra (Army), the dark blue anchor (Navy) and the sky blue wings (Air Force) under the royal Great Crown of Victory.

== Royal Thai Armed Forces Headquarters ==
Flag	Date	Use	Description
	1979–present	Flag of the Royal Thai Armed Forces Headquarters	Flag in the ratio of 2:3, with a yellow border on three sides except for the side facing the flag pole. The center is divided into a tricolour with red, dark blue and sky blue in order from the flag pole out (These represents the colour of the Army, Navy and Air force). At the center of the tricolour is a badge of the Headquarters with a golden Chakra, with an anchor with golden chains and golden Wings, surrounded by a golden wreath.
	1979–present	Flag of the Chief of Defence Forces of Thailand	Similar to the Flag of the Royal Thai Armed Forces HQ but with five yellow stars surrounding the bottom of the badge.

== Royal Thai Army ==
Flag	Date	Use	Description
	1979–present	Flag of the Royal Thai Army	Red flag with a ratio of 2:3, with the emblem of the Royal Thai Army: a chakra under the Thai symbol for Aum /Unalome topped by the Great Crown of Victory with rays emanating from the top and surrounded by a wreath.

=== Army unit colour ===
Flag	Date	Use	Description
	1979–present	Royal Thai Army unit colours	A square Trairanga with the emblem of Royal Thai Army in middle, surrounded below with the unit's name, and the Royal Cypher of King Bhumibol Adulyadej at top canton. This is the pattern currently issued to the units of the army, except for the battalions of the King's Own Bodyguards, which has its own design. This Colour called "Thong Chai Chalermphol" (ธงชัยเฉลิมพล) which can be translated as "Victory Colours").

==== King's Own Bodyguards ====
Flag	Date	Use	Description
	1953–present	1st Infantry Regiment, King's Own Bodyguards unit colours	Trairanga with a red rectangle with a white elephant in regalia at the center. In the top canton is the crowned royal cypher in gold with the name of the unit below.

=== Army command flags ===
Flag	Date	Use	Description
	1979–present	Flag of the Commander-in-Chief of the Royal Thai Army	Red flag in the ratio of 2:3, with the emblem of the Royal Thai Army with five stars underneath.
	1979–present	Flag for Regional Commanders	Red flag with the emblem of the Royal Thai Army with three stars underneath. Currently there are four Army regions: the 1st (Central), 2nd (Northeast), 3rd (Northwest) and 4th (South).
	1979–present	Flag for Divisional Commanders	Red flag with the emblem of the Royal Thai Army with two stars, one on either side.

=== Army rank flags ===
Flag	Date	Use	Description
	1979–present	Flag for the rank of Field Marshal	Red flag in the ratio of 2:3, with five yellow stars surrounding a badge consisting of a crossed Royal Garuda Baton and a saber surrounded by a wreath of leaves.
	1979–present	Flag for the rank of General	Red flag with four yellow stars in the middle
	1979–present	Flag for the rank of Lieutenant General	Red with three yellow stars in the middle
	1979–present	Flag for the rank of Major General	Red flag with two yellow stars in the middle
	1979–present	Flag for the rank of Brigadier General	Red flag with one yellow star in the middle

=== Army identification flag ===
Flag	Date	Use	Description
	1979–present	Identification flag for an Army Corps	Diagonal red and pink flag with the emblem of the Royal Thai Army in the canton, with three stars (arranged horizontally).
	1979–present	Identification flag for an Army Division	Diagonal red and pink flag with the emblem of the Royal Thai Army in the canton, with two stars (arranged horizontally).
	1979–present	Identification flag for an Army Regiment	Diagonal red and pink flag with the emblem of the Royal Thai Army in the canton.
	1979–present	Identification flag for a Cadet Regiment	Diagonal red and yellow flag with the emblem of the Royal Military Academy in the canton.
	1979–present	Identification flag for a Special Forces Unit	Diagonal red and pink flag with the emblem of the Royal Thai Army in the canton and the emblem of the Special Forces in the pink half.
	1979–present	Identification flag for a Flying Unit	Diagonal red and pink flag with the emblem of the Royal Thai Army in the canton and the emblem of the Flying unit in the pink half.
	1979–present	Identification flag for an Infantry Battalion	Diagonal red and white flag, with a red line running counter diagonal, with the emblem of the Royal Thai Army in the canton.
	1979–present	Identification flag for a Special Forces Battalion	Diagonal red and white flag, with a red line running counter diagonal, with the emblem of the Royal Thai Army in the canton and the emblem of the Special Forces in the center.
	1979–present	Identification flag for a Cavalry Battalion	Diagonal red flag, with a white triangle on the right half and Wedgwood blue triangle at the bottom, with the emblem of the Royal Thai Army on the canton.
	1979–present	Identification flag for an Artillery Battalion	Diagonal red flag, with a white triangle on the right half and yellow triangle at the bottom, with the emblem of the Royal Thai Army on the canton.
	1979–present	Identification flag for a Cadet Battalion	Diagonal red flag, with a white triangle on the right half and yellow triangle at the bottom, with the emblem of the Royal Military Academy on the canton.
	1979–present	Identification flag for an Engineer Battalion	Diagonal red flag, with a white triangle on the right half and black triangle at the bottom, with the emblem of the Royal Thai Army on the canton.
	1979–present	Identification flag for a Signals Battalion	Diagonal red flag, with a white triangle on the right half and purple triangle at the bottom, with the emblem of the Royal Thai Army on the canton.
	1979–present	Identification flag for a Transport Battalion	Diagonal red flag, with a white triangle on the right half and maroon triangle at the bottom, with the emblem of the Royal Thai Army on the canton.
	1979–present	Identification flag for a Medical Battalion	Diagonal red flag, with a white triangle on the right half and green triangle at the bottom, with the emblem of the Royal Thai Army on the canton.
	1979–present	Identification flag for a Military Police Battalion	Diagonal red flag, with a white triangle on the right half and navy blue triangle at the bottom, with the emblem of the Royal Thai Army on the canton.
	1979–present	Identification flag for an Ordnance Battalion	Diagonal red flag, with a white triangle on the right half and orange triangle at the bottom, with the emblem of the Royal Thai Army on the canton.
	1979–present	Identification flag for a Flying Battalion	Diagonal red flag, with a white triangle on the right half and sky blue triangle at the bottom, with the emblem of the Royal Thai Army on the canton and the emblem of the Flying unit in the center.

=== Historical army flags ===
Flag	Date	Use	Description
	1892–1908	Flag of the Royal Siamese Army	Red flag with the Coat of Arms of Siam at the centre. Created during the reign of King Chulalongkorn (reigning 1868–1910) for the first modern equipped land force in Siam.
	1908–1936	Flag of the Royal Siamese Army	Red flag with a white elephant in regalia. With the appropriate royal cypher in the top canton.
	1936–1979	Flag of the Royal Thai Army	Trairanga with the old emblem of the Royal Siamese Army at the center. The emblem depicts an unalom, inside a chakra. Inside the rim of the chakra is written the phrase: สละชีพ เพื่อชาติ (Willing to give-up life for country). The chakra is surrounded by rays of light.
	1936–1938	Flag of the Commander of the Royal Siamese Army	Trairanga in the ratio of 5:6, with a white Chakra at the center.
	1938–1979	Flag of the Commander of the Royal Thai Army	Trairanga in the ratio of 5:6, with a Chakra and the Great Crown of Victory in yellow.
	1892–1897	Regimental Colours of the Royal Siamese Army.	From the Flag Regulations for the Kingdom of Siam of Rattanakosin Era 110, granted in 1892 A.D. White, in the upper right hand corner of which is the seal of office of the regimental namely: - a small red rectangular ground one sixth of the length by one sixth of the breadth of the flag. In the center of this small red ground is a pedestal of yellow colour on which stands a white, elephant, caparisoned, and facing the flag stall. The colour of the ground of the seal of office varies according to instructions. These Colours are to be used at all Royal festival and receptions, also in Military expeditions.
	1908–1910	Royal Siamese Army unit colours	Square red flag with a white elephant in regalia. With the Royal Cypher of King Chulalongkorn in the canton. The unit's name is written around the cypher.
	1910–1925	Royal Siamese Army unit colours	Square red flag with a white elephant in regalia. With the Royal Cypher of King Vajiravudh in the canton. The unit's name is written around the cypher.
	1925–1935	Royal Siamese Army unit colours	Square red flag with a white elephant in regalia. With the Royal Cypher of King Prajadhipok in the canton. The unit's name is written around the cypher.
	1936–1949	Royal Thai Army unit colours	A square national flag of Thailand (also called the Trairanga). With the old emblem of Royal Thai Army in middle, surrounded below with the unit's name, and the Royal Cypher of King Ananda Mahidol at top canton.
	1949–1979	Royal Thai Army unit colours	A square Trairanga with the old emblem of Royal Thai Army in middle, surrounded below with the unit's name, and the Royal Cypher of King Bhumibol Adulyadej at top canton.

== Royal Thai Navy ==
Flag	Date	Use	Description
	1979–present	Flag of the Royal Thai Navy	Navy blue flag in the ratio of 2:3, with the emblem of Royal Thai Navy in a white circle.
	1917–present	Naval ensign of Thailand	A Trairanga with a red disc containing a white elephant in regalia centred on the National Flag (also known as the 'Trairanga').
	1917–present	Naval jack (and naval unit colour) of Thailand	A Trairanga with the emblem of Royal Thai Navy in the center.

=== Naval command flags ===
Flag	Date	Use	Description
	1897–present	Flag for the Commander-in-Chief of the Royal Thai Navy	Navy blue flag in the ratio of 2:3, with the emblem of the Royal Thai Navy.
	1936–present	Flag for the Commander of the Fleet	Navy blue swallow-tailed flag in the ratio of 2:3, with the emblem of the Royal Thai Navy.
	1936–present	Flag for the Commander of a Squadron	Navy blue swallow-tailed flag with the emblem of the Royal Thai Navy, the tip of the flag is white.
	1936–present	Flag for the Commander of a Base	Navy blue swallow-tailed flag with the emblem of the Royal Thai Navy, the tip of the flag is sky blue.
	1936–present	Flag for the Commander of a Coastal Station	Navy blue swallow-tailed flag with the emblem of the Royal Thai Navy, the tip of the flag is red.
	1936–present	Flag for the Commander of the Royal Thai Marine Corps	Navy blue swallow-tailed flag with the emblem of the Royal Thai Navy, the tip of the flag is yellow.

=== Naval rank flags ===
Flag	Date	Use	Description
	1979–present	Flag for the rank of Admiral of the Fleet	Navy blue square flag with five white Chakras. The Chakras are positioned with four on each corner and one at the center of the flag.
	1979–present	Flag for the rank of admiral	Navy blue square flag with four white Chakras. The Chakras are positioned with four on each corner of the flag.
	1979–present	Flag for the rank of vice admiral	Navy blue square flag with three white Chakras. Three Chakras two below and one in the middle of the flag- forming a triangle.
	1979–present	Flag for the rank of rear admiral	Navy blue square flag with two white Chakras. Two Chakras parallel vertically.
	1979–present	Flag for the rank of commodore	Navy blue square flag with one white Chakra. One Chakra at the center of the flag.

=== Historical naval flags ===
Flag	Date	Use	Description
	1881–1897	Naval ensign of Siam	Red flag with a white elephant in regalia, with a white Chakra at the top corner.
	1898–1912	Naval ensign of Siam	Red flag with a white elephant in regalia.
	1912–1917	Naval ensign of Siam	Red flag with a white elephant in regalia, with the emblem of the Royal Thai Navy at the top corner.
	1855–1881	Naval jack of Siam	Blue flag with a white elephant.
	1881–1917	Naval jack of Siam	Blue flag with a white elephant in regalia.

== Royal Thai Air Force ==
Flag	Date	Use	Description
	1979–present	Flag of the Royal Thai Air Force	Sky blue flag in the ratio of 2:3, with the emblem of the Royal Thai Air Force: double-wings with the Thai Aum/ Unalome under the Great Crown of Victory with light emanating from the top.

=== Air Force unit colour ===
Flag	Date	Use	Description
	1936–present	Royal Thai Air Force unit colours	A square Trairanga with the emblem of the Royal Thai Air Force inside blue circle with yellow border in middle and flanked with unit's name. At the Canton is the King's royal cypher. This colour called "Thong Chai Chalermphol" (ธงชัยเฉลิมพล) which can be translated as "Victory Colours").

=== Air Force command flags ===
Flag	Date	Use	Description
	1979–present	Flag for Commander-in-Chief of the Royal Thai Air Force	Sky blue flag in the ratio of 2:3, with yellow borders and an emblem depicting an escutcheon depicting the National flag, behind are a pair of wings, topped by the Great Crown of Victory, with light rays and a white Aum/ Unalome.

=== Air Force rank flags ===
Flag	Date	Use	Description
	1979–present	Flag for the rank of Marshal of the Royal Thai Air Force	Sky blue flag in the ratio of 5:6, with five white stars surrounding a badge consisting of a crossed Royal Garuda Baton and a saber surrounded by a wreath of leaves in white.
	1979–present	Flag for the rank of Air Chief Marshal	Sky blue flag with four white stars.
	1979–present	Flag for the rank of Air Marshal	Sky blue flag with three white stars.
	1979–present	Flag for the rank of Air Vice Marshal	Sky blue flag with two white stars.
	1979–present	Flag for the rank of Air Commodore	Sky blue flag with one white star.

=== Historical air force flags ===
Flag	Date	Use	Description
	1936–1939	Flag of the Royal Siamese Air Force Division	Trairanga with the emblem of the Royal Siamese Air Force Division (name later changed to Royal Siamese Air Force in 1937) on a blue background in the center.
	1939–1946	Flag of the Royal Thai Air Force	Trairanga with the old emblem of the Royal Thai Air Force on a blue circle in the center. Top right is the Royal Cypher of King Ananda Mahidol (1935–1946).
	1939–1946	Flag of the Royal Thai Air Force	Trairanga with the old emblem of the Royal Thai Air Force on a blue circle in the center. Top right is the Royal Cypher of King Bhumibol Adulyadej.
	1946–1979	Flag of the Royal Thai Air Force	Trairanga with the emblem of the Royal Thai Air Force on a blue circle in the center. Top right is the Royal Cypher of King Bhumibol Adulyadej.
	1936–1979	Flag of the Commander of the Royal Siamese Air Force	Sky blue flag in the ratio of 5:6, with a yellow Chakra with two wings, topped by the Great Crown of Victory.

== Historical war flags ==
Flag	Date	Use	Description
	1885–1887	Standard of the Royal Siamese Army during the Haw wars (ธงจุฑาธุชธิปไตย: Thong Chudhadhujdhippatai)	A red Flag with the Royal Coat of Arms of Siam at the center, with a three borders depicting the blades of a chakra. The flags was presented to Chao Phraya Surasakmontri (Cherm Saeng-Chuto) by King Chulalongkorn in 1885 as a colour for the Siamese army sent to fight the Haw rebels in the north of the country, the war ended in 1890.
	1912–1925	Standard of the Royal Siamese Army under King Vajiravudh (ธงมหาไพชยนต์ธวัช: Thong Mahapachayonthawat)	Created in 1912 by King Vajiravudh. The king intended to have the flag paired with that of his father's. The standard is red with a black rectangle, in the center is the personal symbol of the King. It depicts the Vajra on a two-tiered pedestal with lightning rays emanating from it. Flanked on either side by seven-tired royal umbrellas.
	1917–1918	Standard of the Siamese Expeditionary Force, Obverse [th]	Trairanga defaced with a red disc containing dressed white elephant, facing a flagpole. Briefly, its appearance is the same as naval ensign, but both red stripes contain a portion of the 6th century Chant to the Buddha's Victories written in Pali using Thai script: "พาหุํสหัส์สมภินิม์มิตสาวุธัน์ตํ ค๎รีเมขลํอุทิตโฆรสเสนมารํ ทานาทิธัม์มวิธินาชิตวามุนิน์โท ตัน์เตชสาภวตุเมชยสิทธินิจ์จํ". This flag was carried by the Siamese volunteer corp sent to the war in Europe in 1918, the force and the flag was part of the Allied victory parade under the Arc de Triomphe, in Paris 1919.
	1917–1918	Standard of the Siamese Expeditionary Force, Reverse [th]	Trairanga defaced with a red disc containing King Vajiravudh's personal cypher. The emblem features Thai acronym "ร.ร." and Thai digit six ("๖"), both are displayed under the glowing crown. Both red stripes of the flag contain the same inscription as the obverse.

== Historical units ==
Flag	Date	Use	Description
	1938–1947	Standard of the Thai Junior Soldiers (ยุวชนทหาร: Yuwachon Thahan)	Trairanga defaced with a red disc, with a yellow border. At the center is the old emblem of the Thai Army. Top canton is the Royal cypher of King Ananda Mahidol. The unit fought against the Japanese army when they invaded Thailand 8 December 1941.

== See also ==
- List of Thai flags
- Royal Flags of Thailand
- Royal Thai Armed Forces
- Sudarshana Chakra- for the symbolism and meaning of the 'Chakras'
