= Thanchaiyan Srisuwan =

Thai military general

General Thanchaiyan Srisuwan
- ธารไชยยันต์ ศรีสุวรรณ
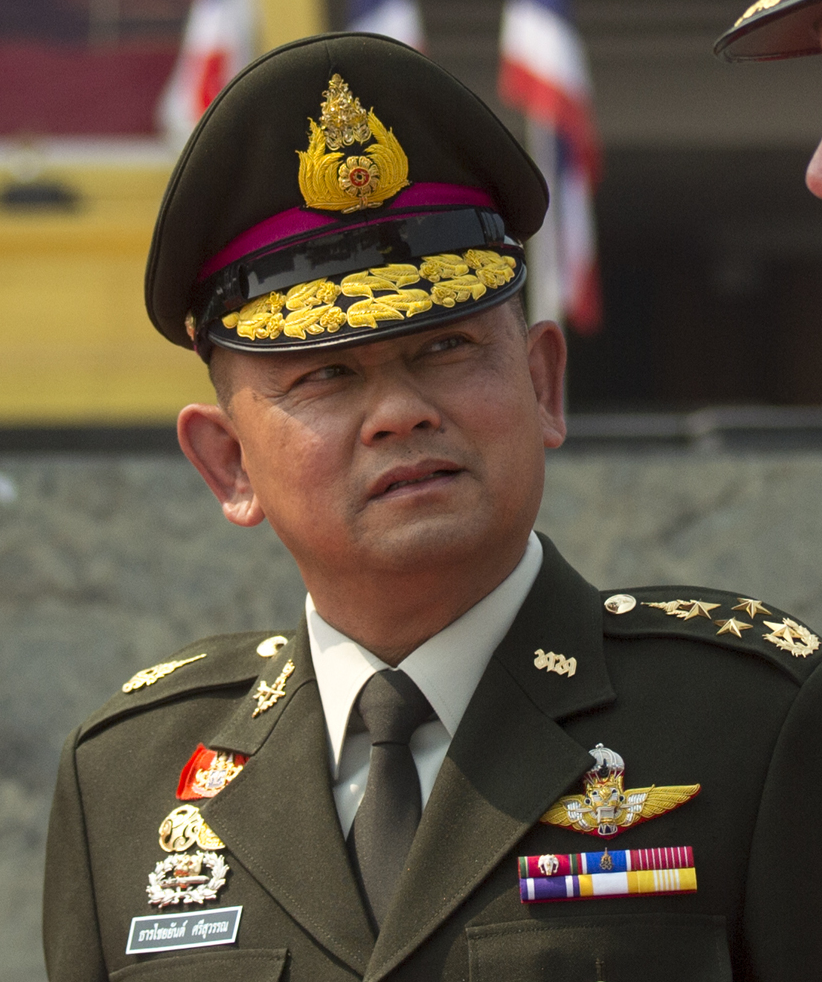
- Thanchaiyan at RTAF HQ in 2018

Chief of Defence Forces
- In office 1 October 2017 – 30 September 2018
- Preceded by: Surapong Suwana-adth
- Succeeded by: Pornpipat Benyasri

Personal details
- Born: 5 August 1958 (age 68) Bangkok, Thailand
- Spouse: Jiraporn Srisuwan
- Education: Royal Military Academy; National Defence College

Military service
- Allegiance: Thailand
- Branch/service: Royal Thai Army
- Rank: General; Admiral; Air Chief Marshal
- Commands: Commander-in-Chief

Thanchaiyan Srisuwan (Thai: ธารไชยยันต์ ศรีสุวรรณ; born 5 August 1958) is a Thai military official, formerly serving as Thailand's Chief of Defence Forces, following his appointment by King Vajiralongkorn in September 2017, in an annual military reshuffle of senior officers. Prior to his appointment, he served as chief of joint staff.

== Education and careers ==
Thanchaiyan studied at Wat Rajbopit School and then attended the Armed Forces Academies Preparatory School as a pre-cadet as a prerequisite for attending Chulachomklao Royal Military Academy (CRMA). After graduating in Military school, he studied at Command and General Staff College and Joint Services Command and Staff College in England.

Thanchaiyan previously held a position in the Royal Thai Army as the Commander of the 1st Cavalry Squadron, 1st Cavalry Regiment, King's Guard and moved to Royal Thai Armed Forces Headquarters as Head of Military Operations of Royal Thai Armed Forces and then Chief of Staff to the Royal Thai Armed Forces.

In 2017 he was appointed Chief of Defence Forces of Royal Thai Armed Forces Headquarters.

He also Member of the National Legislative Assembly.

== Awards ==
- The Most Exalted Order of the White Elephant
- The Most Noble Order of the Crown of Thailand
- Border Services Medal
- Honorary Airborne Wings of the Royal Thai Army
