= Pornpipat Benyasri =

Thai Military General

General Pornpipat Benyasri
- พรพิพัฒน์ เบญญศรี
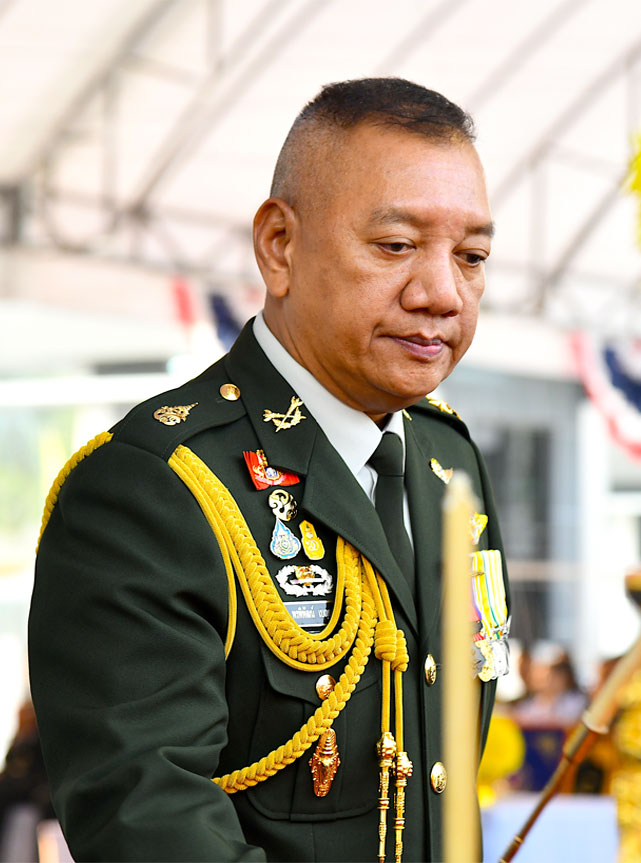
- Pornpipat on Armed Forces Day 2020

Member of the Senate of Thailand
- Ex officio 11 May 2019 – 30 September 2020
- Preceded by: Position established
- Succeeded by: Chalermpol Srisawat

Chiefs of Defence Forces
- In office 1 October 2018 – 30 September 2020
- Preceded by: Thanchaiyan Srisuwan
- Succeeded by: Chalermpol Srisawat

Personal details
- Born: 17 March 1960 (age 66) Bangkok, Thailand
- Spouse: Jirapan Benyasri
- Education: Royal Military Academy; National Defence College

Military service
- Allegiance: Thailand
- Branch/service: Royal Thai Army
- Rank: General; Admiral; Air Chief Marshal
- Commands: Chief of Defence Forces; Chief of Staff, RTAF HQ; Deputy Chief of Staff, RTAF HQ

Pornpipat Benyasri (Thai: พรพิพัฒน์ เบญญศรี, RTGS: Phonphiphat Benyasi; born 17 March 1960) is a Thai General who served as the Chief of Defence Forces of the Royal Thai Armed Forces, following his appointment by King Vajiralongkorn in September 2018. He held various positions including as the commander of the National Defence College in 2006, became the Permanent Secretary of the Military Accounts in 2013, became the Deputy Chief of Staff, Royal Thai Armed Forces Headquarters in 2016, and became the Chief of Staff, Royal Thai Armed Forces Headquarters in 2017.

== Education and careers ==
Pornpipat studied in primary and secondary at Suankularb Wittayalai School and then attended the Armed Forces Academies Preparatory School as a pre-cadet as a prerequisite for attending Chulachomklao Royal Military Academy (CRMA). After graduating from Military school, he studied at Command and General Staff College and National Defence College.

Pornpipat started his military career at Royal Thai Army as Platoon Commander of the 3rd Infantry Battalion, 11th Infantry Regiment, King's Guard. Then he moved to be a teacher at the Command and General Staff College, Royal Thai Army.

After moving to Royal Thai Armed Forces Headquarters, Pornpipat previously held the position of Commander of the Armed Forces Academies Preparatory School, Head of the Office of the Comptroller of the Royal Thai Armed Forces and Chief of Staff to the Royal Thai Armed Forces.

In his Royal career, he was on a Committee on Projects and Activities Commemoration on the auspicious occasion of the coronation of King Vajiralongkorn and Chairman of the Subcommittee on Organizing of the Royal barge procession in 2019.

== Honours ==
received the following royal decorations in the Honours System of Thailand:

- Thailand :
  - 2017 - Knight Grand Cordon of the Most Exalted Order of the White Elephant
  - 2013 - Knight Grand Cordon of the Most Noble Order of the Crown of Thailand
  - 1987 - Freeman Safeguarding Medal - 2nd Class 2nd Cat
  - 1992 - Border Service Medal
  - 1995 - Chakra Mala Medal

=== Foreign honours ===
- Australia :
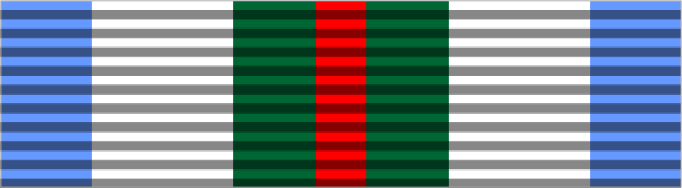
  - International Force East Timor Medal
- U.S.A. :
  - Commander of the Legion of Merit (2019)
- Malaysia :
  - The Most Gallant Order of Military Service (P.G.A.T.) (2019)
- UN :
  - United Nations Medal (UNAMET)
