= Thanasak Patimaprakorn =

Thai military officer (born 1953)

Thanasak Patimaprakorn MPCh MWM TChW RMK
- ธนะศักดิ์ ปฏิมาประกร
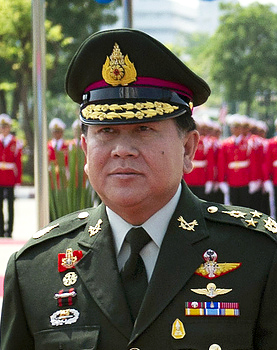
- Thanasak Patimaprakorn in 2012

Deputy Prime Minister of Thailand
- In office 30 August 2014 – 24 November 2017
- Prime Minister: Prayut Chan-o-cha

Minister of Foreign Affairs
- In office 30 August 2014 – 19 August 2015
- Prime Minister: Prayut Chan-o-cha
- Preceded by: Surapong Tovichakchaikul
- Succeeded by: Don Pramudwinai

Chief of Defence Forces
- In office 1 October 2011 – 30 September 2014
- Preceded by: Songkitti Jaggabatara
- Succeeded by: Worapong Sanganetra

Personal details
- Born: 9 November 1953 (age 72) Nakhon Ratchasima, Thailand
- Spouse: Penluck Patimaprakorn
- Education: National Defence College; Chulachomklao Royal Military Academy

Military service
- Allegiance: Thailand
- Branch/service: Royal Thai Army
- Years of service: 1972–2014
- Rank: General; Admiral; Air Chief Marshal
- Commands: Chief of Defence Forces

Thanasak Patimaprakorn (Thai: ธนะศักดิ์ ปฏิมาประกร, RTGS: Thanasak Patimaprakon; born 9 November 1953) is a Thai military officer who formerly served as its deputy prime minister and Minister of Foreign Affairs. He was appointed by prime minister Prayut Chan-o-cha on 1 September 2014 after serving as Thailand's Chief of Defence Forces.

== Chief of Defense Forces ==
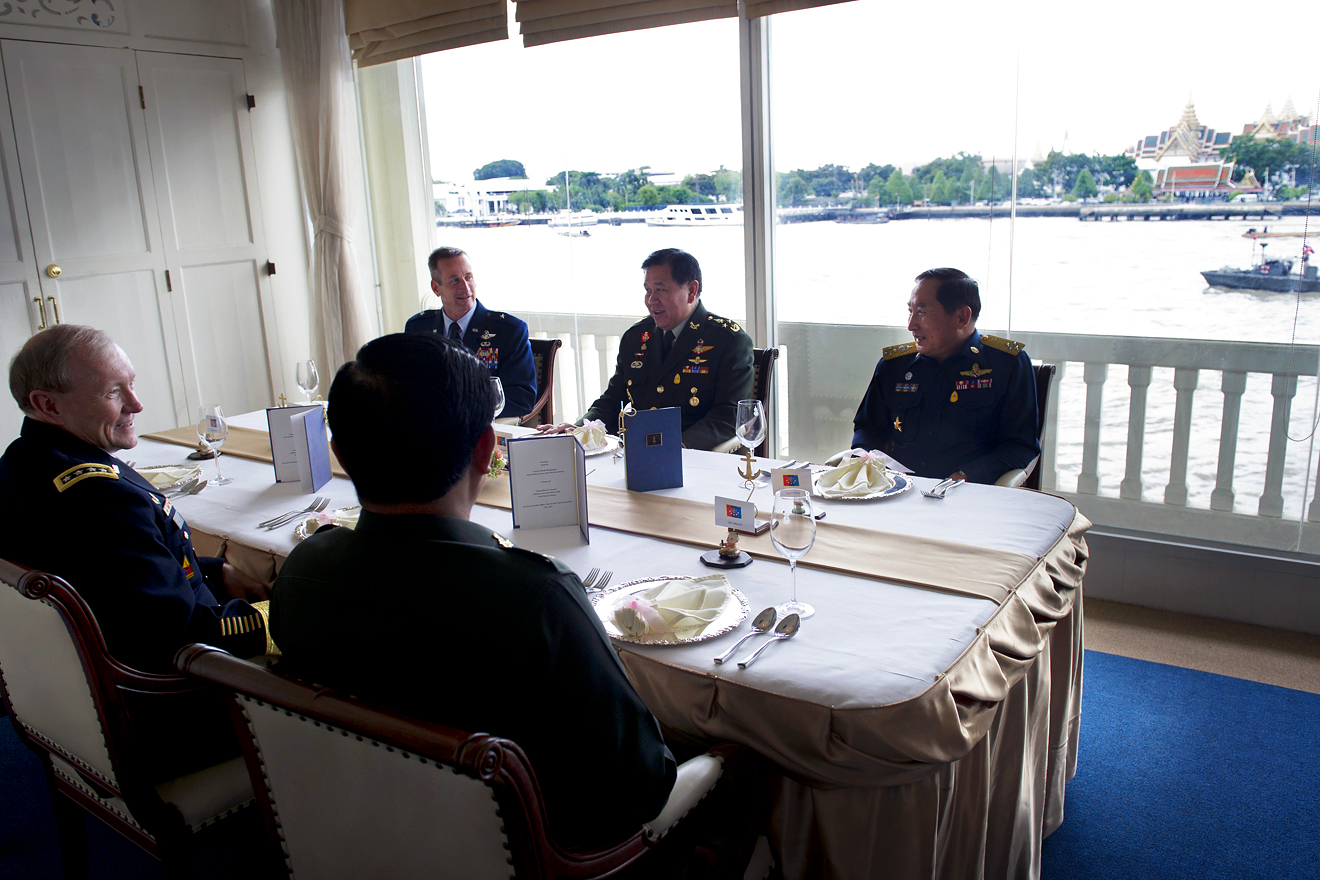
Thai Chief of Defense Forces Gen. Thanasak and the military chiefs host a lunch for U.S. Army Gen. Martin E. Dempsey, chairman of the Joint Chiefs of Staff, in Bangkok, June 5, 2012

Patimaprakorn served as Thailand's chief of defense forces from 2011 to 2014. In this position, he oversaw combat readiness and commanded military operations in all three branches of the Royal Thai Armed Forces. His position was at the top of the military chain of command, although in practice he remained subordinate to army chief Prayut Chan-o-cha.

== Role in the Cabinet ==
=== Deputy-Head of the National Council of Peace and Order ===
On May 22, 2014, it was announced that Patimaprakorn would serve as the Deputy-Head of the National Council for Peace and Order (NCPO). He is one of 11 military officers appointed to the 32-member cabinet. This announcement took place during the Thai military coup of 2014. It was initially thought that the military had no interest in a coup, as Patimaprakorn had made a public statement in early May 2014 suggesting as much.

Prime Minister Prayut Chan-o-cha has stated that the goals of the NCPO are greater political stability and reforms for Thailand, and Patimaprakorn supported that statement in his message to the United Nations in September 2014. He stated that Thailand was "not retreating from democracy; it just needed time and space to bring about reconciliation, undertake political reforms and strengthen democratic institutions." In a meeting with U.N. Secretary General Ban Ki-moon, Pratimaprakorn has also acknowledged the importance of addressing climate change and extremism in Thailand.

Pratimaprakorn has also addressed the Organization for Security and Co-operation in Europe (OSCE). In his remarks in June 2015, he mentioned the need for combating extremism once again, in addition to expressing a need for greater disaster management in Asia and emphasizing Thailand's efforts to address human trafficking. He ended his remarks by stating that Thailand would be happy to work as a bridge between OSCE and the Association of Southeast Asian Nations (ASEAN).

Pratimaprakorn has also been vocal in the need to support migrants off the coast of Thailand. In a special meeting attended by 16 powerful countries in the region, Pratimaprakorn urged unity on the issue and said that all countries must work together to solve what is a very complex problem. He also described the actions Thailand is currently taking on the issue, which includes deploying vessels at sea as floating platforms to provide humanitarian assistance to migrants.

=== Minister of Foreign Affairs ===
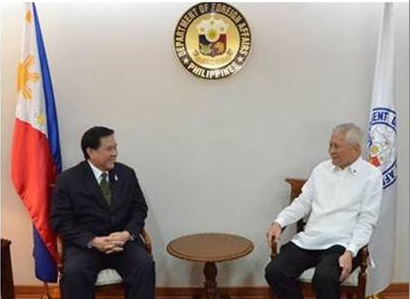
Thanasak Patimaprakorn made an official visit to the Philippines

As Minister of Foreign Affairs, Pratimaprakorn is responsible for communicating and meeting with foreign governments.

One of the major actions he has undertaken in this position is working closely with Prime Minister Chan-o-cha to ensure closer ties with China. He has said of the two countries' diplomatic relations, "At this moment we believe this is the best time for our relationship. Especially for my personal contact with minister Wang Yi who is a very nice and polite person.” Yi had similar comments about Pratimaprakorn and about China's relations with Thailand, saying that they are "as close as family members." China and Thailand have recently been working to join hands on projects like infrastructure and clean energy, and Pratimaprakorn has even said that "the China-ASEAN bloc works as more of a community of shared destiny."

In January 2015, Pratimapragorn welcomed U.S. Assistant Secretary of State Daniel Russel to Thailand on a visit meant to show that the U.S. wanted to be more assertive in its relationship with Thailand. The visit turned controversial, however, after the U.S. urged Thailand to end martial law and return to civilian rule.

In December 2015, Patimaprakorn also welcomed the Ambassador of the Russian Federation, Kirill Barsky, speaking with him about increasing tourism to Russia from Thailand and preparing to jointly celebrate the 120th anniversary of the establishment of diplomatic relations between Russia and Thailand.
