= Chief of Defence Forces (Thailand) =

Senior appointment in the armed forces of Thailand

- ผู้บัญชาการทหารสูงสุด
- Seal of the Chief of Defence Forces

- Flag of the Chief of Defence Forces

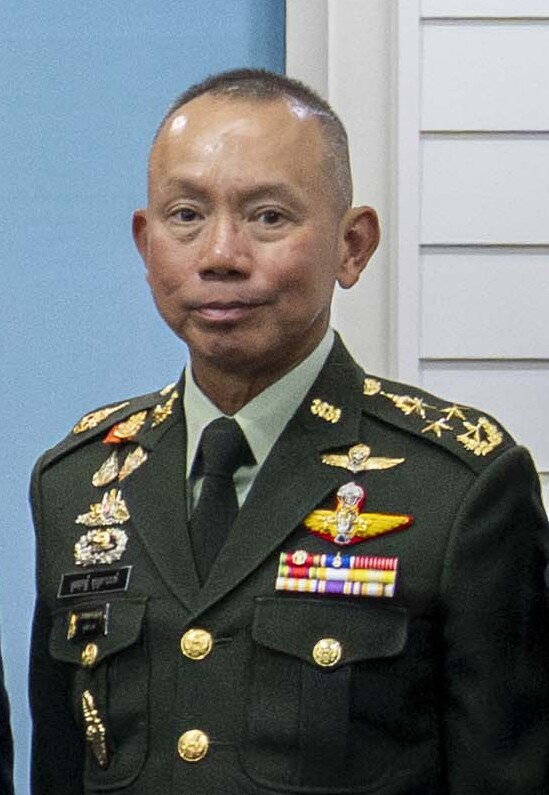
- Incumbent; General Ukrit Boontanon since 1 October 2025
- Ministry of Defence
- Member of: Royal Thai Armed Forces Headquarters
- Reports to: Minister of Defence
- Seat: Lak Si, Bangkok
- Nominator: Minister of Defence
- Appointer: King of Thailand
- Formation: 13 November 1940
- First holder: Field Marshal Plaek Phibunsongkhram
- Website: Official website

The Chief of Defence Forces, previously known as the Supreme Commander, (Thai: ผู้บัญชาการทหารสูงสุด, RTGS: Phu Bancha Kan Thahan Sung Sut) is the overall field commander of the Royal Thai Armed Forces. They are also in charge of managing the Royal Thai Armed Forces Headquarters. The position is not to be confused with the ceremonial Highest Commander of the Royal Thai Armed Forces who is the constitutional monarch of Thailand.

== History ==
Prior to 1960 the post was an ad hoc creation by Field Marshal Plaek Phibunsongkhram, during World War II. However, under Field Marshal Sarit Thanarat the position became permanent, and in its early life was even combined with the post of Prime Minister of Thailand. In February 2008 the English name of the post was changed from Supreme Commander to Chief of Defence Forces with the reorganization of the Supreme Command Headquarters into the Royal Thai Armed Forces Headquarters (though the Thai term remained the same).

The enactment of 1997 constitution of Thailand on 11 October 1997 prohibits double-hatting of this position and each service branch commander-in-chief, the general officer appointed to the Chief of Defence Forces after the date acts more like a coordinator between three military branches. Still, they commands smaller military force than the Army, the Navy, or the Air Force has. So, the position is usually reserved for senior army generals who will not be appointed as the Commander-in-Chief of the Royal Thai Army and will retire on the same year with the latter. It is customary to appoint the chief of defence to four-star rank in all three branches in the Armed Forces for inspection of other branches of the military.

== List of chiefs ==
=== Supreme Commanders (1941−2008) ===
No.	Portrait	Supreme Commander	Took office	Left office	Time in office	Defence branch
Temporary command during the Franco-Thai War
1	Plaek Phibunsongkhram	Major General; Plaek Phibunsongkhram (1897–1964)	13 November 1940	30 April 1941	168 days	Royal Thai Army
Temporary command during the Pacific War
(1)	Plaek Phibunsongkhram	Field Marshal; Plaek Phibunsongkhram (1897–1964)	12 November 1941	24 November 1943	2 years, 12 days	Royal Thai Army
Permanent command
2	Sarit Thanarat	Field Marshal; Sarit Thanarat (1908–1963)	27 September 1957	8 December 1963 †	6 years, 72 days	Royal Thai Army
3	Thanom Kittikachorn	Field Marshal; Thanom Kittikachorn (1911–2004)	11 December 1963	30 September 1973	9 years, 293 days	Royal Thai Army
4	Dawee Chullasapya	Air Chief Marshal; Dawee Chullasapya (1914–1996)	1 October 1973	30 September 1974	364 days	Royal Thai Air Force
5	Kris Sivara	General; Kris Sivara (1914–1976)	1 October 1974	30 September 1975	364 days	Royal Thai Army
6	Sangad Chaloryu	Admiral; Sangad Chaloryu (1915–1980)	1 October 1975	30 September 1976	365 days	Royal Thai Navy
7	Kamon Dachatungkha [th]	Air Chief Marshal; Kamon Dachatungkha (1917–2002)	1 October 1976	30 September 1977	364 days	Royal Thai Air Force
8	Kriangsak Chamanan	General; Kriangsak Chamanan (1917–2003)	1 October 1977	30 September 1978	364 days	Royal Thai Army
9	Serm Na Nagara [th]	General; Serm Na Nagara (1921–2009)	1 October 1978	30 September 1981	2 years, 364 days	Royal Thai Army
10	Saiyud Kerdphol [th]	General; Saiyud Kerdphol (1923–2026)	1 October 1981	30 September 1983	1 year, 364 days	Royal Thai Army
11	Arthit Kamlang-ek	General; Arthit Kamlang-ek (1925–2015)	1 October 1983	31 August 1986	2 years, 334 days	Royal Thai Army
12	Supa Gajaseni [th]	Admiral; Supa Gajaseni (1926–2021)	1 September 1986	30 September 1987	1 year, 29 days	Royal Thai Navy
13	Chavalit Yongchaiyudh	General; Chavalit Yongchaiyudh (born 1932)	1 October 1987	31 March 1990	2 years, 181 days	Royal Thai Army
14	Sunthorn Kongsompong	General; Sunthorn Kongsompong (1931–1999)	1 April 1990	30 September 1991	1 year, 182 days	Royal Thai Army
15	Suchinda Kraprayoon	General; Suchinda Kraprayoon (1933–2025)	1 October 1991	4 April 1992	186 days	Royal Thai Army
16	Kaset Rojananil	Air Chief Marshal; Kaset Rojananil (1933–2024)	6 April 1992	31 July 1992	116 days	Royal Thai Air Force
17	Voranat Aphichari [th]	Air Chief Marshal; Voranat Aphichari (1934–2015)	1 August 1992	30 September 1994	2 years, 60 days	Royal Thai Air Force
18	Watanachai Wootisiri [th]	General; Watanachai Wootisiri (1935–2024)	1 October 1994	30 September 1995	364 days	Royal Thai Army
19	Viroj Sangsanit [th]	General; Viroj Sangsanit (born 1935)	1 October 1995	30 September 1996	365 days	Royal Thai Army
20	Mongkon Amphornpisit [th]	General; Mongkon Amphornpisit (born 1940)	1 October 1996	30 September 2000	3 years, 365 days	Royal Thai Army
21	Somphao Chusri [th]	General; Somphao Chusri (1941–2024)	1 October 2000	30 September 2001	364 days	Royal Thai Army
22	Narong Yuthavong [th]	Admiral; Narong Yuthavong (born 1941)	1 October 2001	30 September 2002	364 days	Royal Thai Navy
23	Surayud Chulanont	General; Surayud Chulanont (born 1943)	1 October 2002	30 September 2003	364 days	Royal Thai Army
24	Somtat Attanand [th]	General; Somtat Attanand (born 1944)	1 October 2003	30 September 2004	365 days	Royal Thai Army
25	Chaiyasit Shinawatra	General; Chaiyasit Shinawatra (born 1945)	1 October 2004	30 September 2005	364 days	Royal Thai Army
26	Ruangroj Mahasaranon	General; Ruangroj Mahasaranon (born 1946)	1 October 2005	30 September 2006	364 days	Royal Thai Army
27	Boonsrang Niumpradit [th]	General; Boonsrang Niumpradit (born 1948)	1 October 2006	30 September 2008	1 year, 365 days	Royal Thai Army

=== Chiefs of Defence Forces (2008−present) ===
No.	Portrait	Chief of Defence Forces	Took office	Left office	Time in office	Defence branch
28	Songkitti Jaggabatara	General; Songkitti Jaggabatara (born 1950)	1 October 2008	30 September 2011	2 years, 364 days	Royal Thai Army
29	Thanasak Patimaprakorn	General; Thanasak Patimaprakorn (born 1953)	1 October 2011	30 September 2014	2 years, 364 days	Royal Thai Army
30	Worapong Sanganetra [th]	General; Worapong Sanganetra (born 1955)	1 October 2014	30 September 2015	364 days	Royal Thai Army
31	Sommai Kaotira [th]	General; Sommai Kaotira (born 1956)	1 October 2015	30 September 2016	365 days	Royal Thai Army
32	Surapong Suwana-adth	General; Surapong Suwana-adth (born 1956)	1 October 2016	30 September 2017	365 days	Royal Thai Army
33	Thanchaiyan Srisuwan	General; Thanchaiyan Srisuwan (born 1958)	1 October 2017	30 September 2018	364 days	Royal Thai Army
34	Pornpipat Benyasri	General; Pornpipat Benyasri (born 1960)	1 October 2018	30 September 2020	1 year, 365 days	Royal Thai Army
35	Chalermpol Srisawat	General; Chalermpol Srisawat (born 1963)	1 October 2020	30 September 2023	2 years, 364 days	Royal Thai Army
36	Songwit Noonpakdee	General; Songwit Noonpakdee (born 1965)	1 October 2023	30 September 2025	1 year, 364 days	Royal Thai Army
37	Ukrit Boontanon [th]	General; Ukrit Boontanon (born 1967)	1 October 2025	Incumbent	1 year, 30 days	Royal Thai Army

== See also ==
- Royal Thai Armed Forces
- Highest Commander of the Royal Thai Armed Forces
- List of commanders-in-chief of the Royal Thai Army
- List of commanders-in-chief of the Royal Thai Navy
- List of commanders-in-chief of the Royal Thai Air Force
