= Surapong Suwana-adth =

Thai military officer (born 1956)

General Surapong Suwana-adth MPCh MWM
- สุรพงษ์ สุวรรณอัตถ์
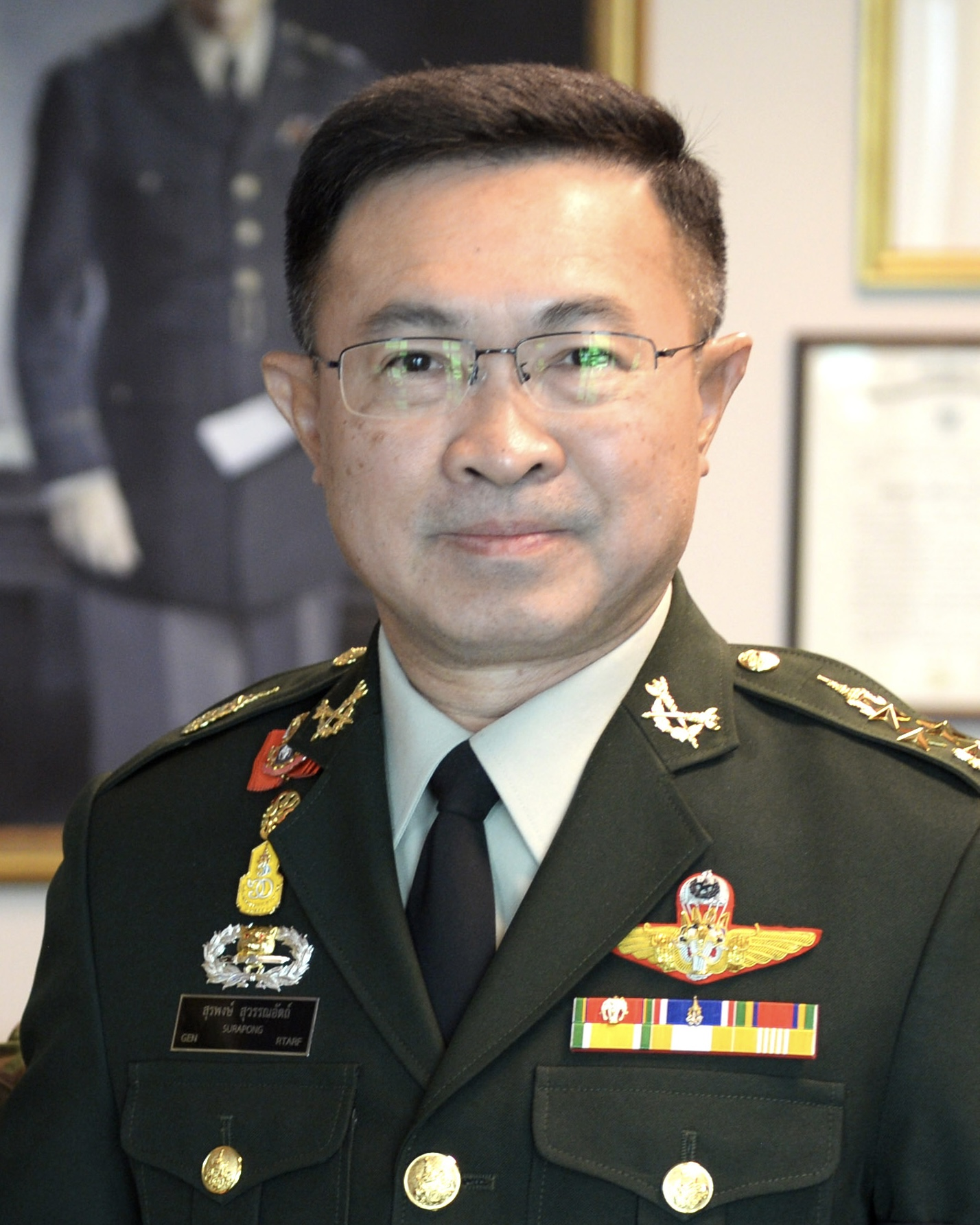
- General Surapong in 2017

Chief of Defence Forces
- In office 1 October 2016 – 30 September 2017
- Preceded by: Sommai Kaotira
- Succeeded by: Thanchaiyan Srisuwan

Personal details
- Born: 28 December 1956 (age 69) Bangkok, Thailand
- Education: Armed Forces Academies Preparatory School; Chulachomklao Royal Military Academy
- Alma mater: University of Virginia (MSc); Virginia Military Institute (BSc)

Military service
- Allegiance: Thailand
- Branch/service: Royal Thai Army
- Rank: General; Admiral; Air Chief Marshal
- Commands: Chief of Joint Staff; Chief of Defence Forces

Surapong Suwana-adth (Thai: สุรพงษ์ สุวรรณอัตถ์; born 28 December 1956) is a Thai military officer who formerly served as Chief of Defence Forces.

== Education ==
Surapong attended the Armed Forces Academies Preparatory School as a pre-cadet as a prerequisite for attending Chulachomklao Royal Military Academy (CRMA).

Surapong obtained his Master of Military Art and Science (M.M.A.S.) from the United States Army Command and General Staff College (CGSC) in 1994; Physics in University of Virginia (M.S.); Physics in Virginia Military Institute (B.S.); and once again attended CGSC in 2017.

== Career ==
Surapong's major positions included being the Army Attaché at the Embassy of Thailand, Washington, D.C., Director of Joint Intelligence, and the Chief of Joint Staff at the Royal Thai Armed Forces Headquarters (RTARF) from 2015 to 2016; Chief of Defence Force at the RTARF from 2016 to 2017; Member of the National Legislative Assembly from 2014 to 2019; Chairman of TOT PCL from 2014 to 2019.

On 1 October 2016, Surapong was appointed the 32nd Chief of Defense Forces. Through a variety of initiatives, such as bilateral drills like Exercise Kocha Singa and multilateral exercises like Exercise Cobra Gold, military-to-military relations of Singapore and Thailand have improved under his direction. At the IPU-UN Regional Conference on 3 October 2019, as a senator and a representative of the Thai parliament, he discussed the legislative branch's duty to highlight the UN Countering Terrorist Travel Program and the need to assist the government, which is the administrative branch, in joining the program.

== Honours ==
On 11 July 2017 at the Lewis and Clark Center, he was admitted into the International Hall of Fame by the United States Army Command and General Staff College. Prior to this, he was awarded the Eisenhower Fellowships in 1994.

=== National ===
- Knight Grand Cross of Order of the White Elephant (MPCh; 2014)
- Knight Grand Cordon of Order of the Crown of Thailand (MVM; 2011)
- Freemen Safeguarding Medal Second Class (SCh2/2)
- Border Service Medal (ChD)
- Chakra Mala Medal (RChM)

=== Foreign ===
- Malaysia:
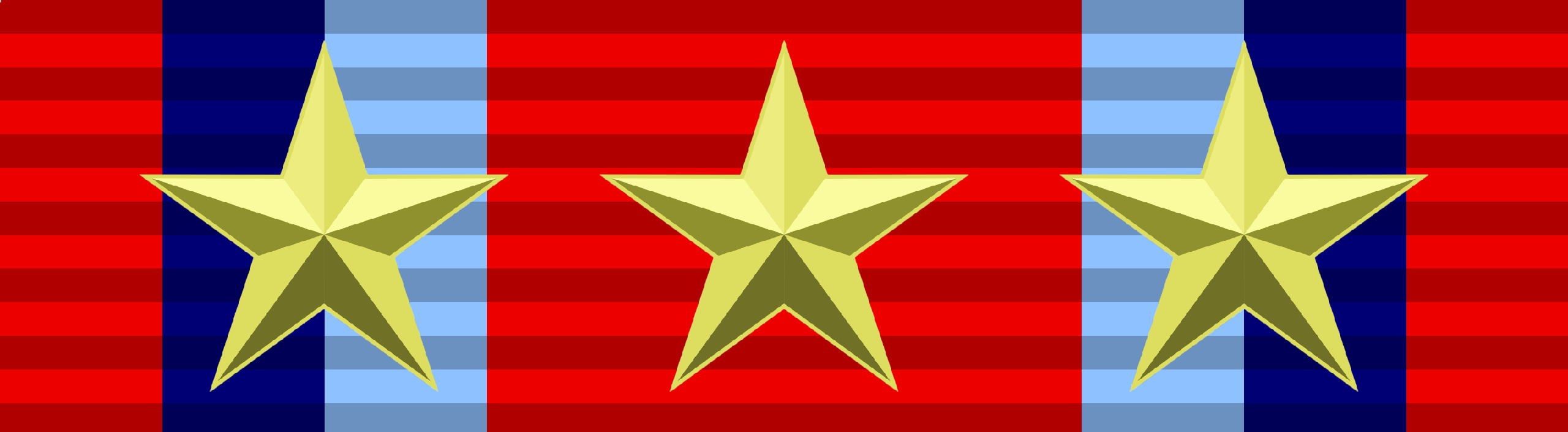
  - Order of Military Service Loyal Commander (PSAT; 2013)
- Singapore:
  - Darjah Utama Bakti Cemerlang (DUBC; 2017)
- United States:
  - Commander of the Legion of Merit (2017)

Military offices
Preceded by Sommai Kaotira	Chiefs of Defence Forces; 1 October 2016 – 30 September 2017	Succeeded by Thanchaiyan Srisuwan
