= Si Sawat (disambiguation) =

Si Sawat may refer to:

== From the Thai term ศรีสวัสดิ์ ==
Also spelled Srisawat, pronounced [sǐː.sa.wàt].

- Si Sawat district, an amphoe in Kanchanaburi province
- Si Sawat River, an alternative name of the Khwae Yai River
- Srisawat, a Thai surname; see there for people with the name

== From the Thai term สีสวาด ==
pronounced [sǐː.sa.wàːt]

- Korat cat, a cat breed also known in Thai as Si Sawat.
