= Chalermpol Srisawat =

Thai military general (born 1963)

General Chalermpol Srisawat MPCh MWM DPKT
- เฉลิมพล ศรีสวัสดิ์
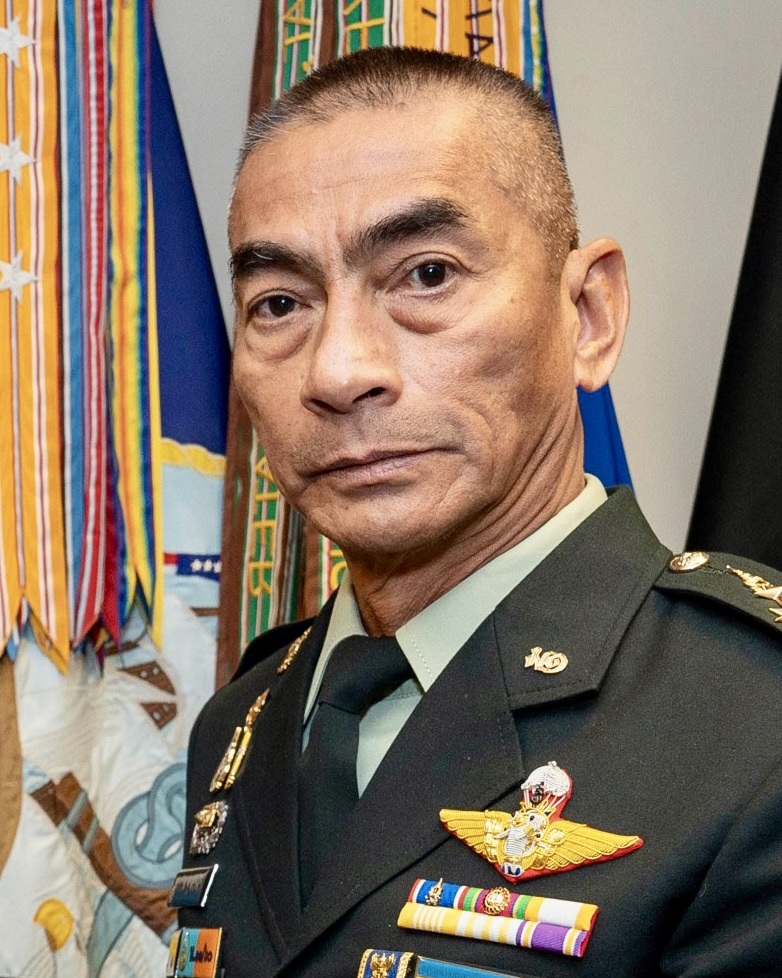
- General Chalermpol in 2021

Chief of Defence Forces
- In office 1 October 2020 – 30 September 2023
- Preceded by: Pornpipat Benyasri
- Succeeded by: Songwit Noonpakdee

Personal details
- Born: 5 January 1963 (age 63) Lopburi, Thailand
- Education: Royal Military Academy; National Defence College

Military service
- Allegiance: Thailand
- Branch/service: Royal Thai Army
- Rank: General; Admiral; Air Chief Marshal
- Commands: Chief of Defence Forces; Chief of Staff, RTAF HQ; Director of Operations, RTA; Commanding General of the 2nd Cavalry Division, King Vajiravudh’s Guard
- Battles/wars: 2008–2013 Cambodian–Thai border crisis

Chalermpol Srisawat (Thai: เฉลิมพล ศรีสวัสดิ์, RTGS: Chaloemphon Sisawat) is a Thai military general. He served as Chief of Defence Forces of the Royal Thai Armed Forces from October 2020 to October 2023.

== Education and careers ==
Chalermpol studied primary and secondary school at Pibulwitthayalai School in Lopburi province and then attended the Armed Forces Academies Preparatory School as a pre-cadet as a prerequisite for attending Chulachomklao Royal Military Academy (CRMA). After graduating military school, he studied at Command and General Staff College and National Defence College.

Chalermpol as a soldier in the cavalry in the Royal Thai Army, he started his career as Commander of the 25th Cavalry Battalion at Saraburi and then Chief of Staff of the 2nd Cavalry Division, King's Guard. In 2015 he became a commander of the 2nd Cavalry Division, King's Guard until 2017. He was then appointed Director-General of Directorate of Operations, Royal Thai Army.

He took part in writing the plan "Chakrabongse Bhuvanath Battle Plan" in the 2008–2013 Cambodian–Thai border crisis in 2011.

After climbing up in the army he has moved to RTARF HQ as Chief of Staff Royal Thai Armed Forces Headquarters and then became Chief of Defence Forces in 2020.

== Awards ==
- Knight Grand Cordon of the Order of the White Elephant
- Knight Grand Cordon of the Order of the Crown of Thailand
- Freeman Safeguarding Medal, 2nd Class
- Chakra Mala Medal

=== Foreign Honours ===
- Malaysia :
  - The Most Gallant Order of Military Service (P.G.A.T.) (2022)
- Singapore :
  - Darjah Utama Bakti Cemerlang (Tentera) (2023)
- Brunei :
  - Order of Paduka Keberanian Laila Terbilang, First Class (DPKT) (2023)
- USA :
  - Commander of the Legion of Merit (2024)
