= CTOC =

CTOC may refer to:

- Cambridge Tenants Organizing Committee, a tenants' organisation in Cambridge, Massachusetts, US
- Chemical Engineering Technology Operating Council, a council of the American Institute of Chemical Engineers
- Chinese Taipei Olympic Committee, the National Olympic Committee representing Taiwan
- Combating transnational organized crime, the control or prevention of crime extending across several countries
- Counter Terrorism Online Centre, an Australian counter-terrorism unit established in 2026
- Counter Terrorist Operations Center in the Royal Thai Armed Forces Headquarters
- Crossrail Train Operating Concession, a British railway operating authority
- Cyber Threat Operations Center, a fictional unit in the American TV series CSI: Cyber
