= 2018 Phuket boat capsizing =

Maritime incident in Thailand

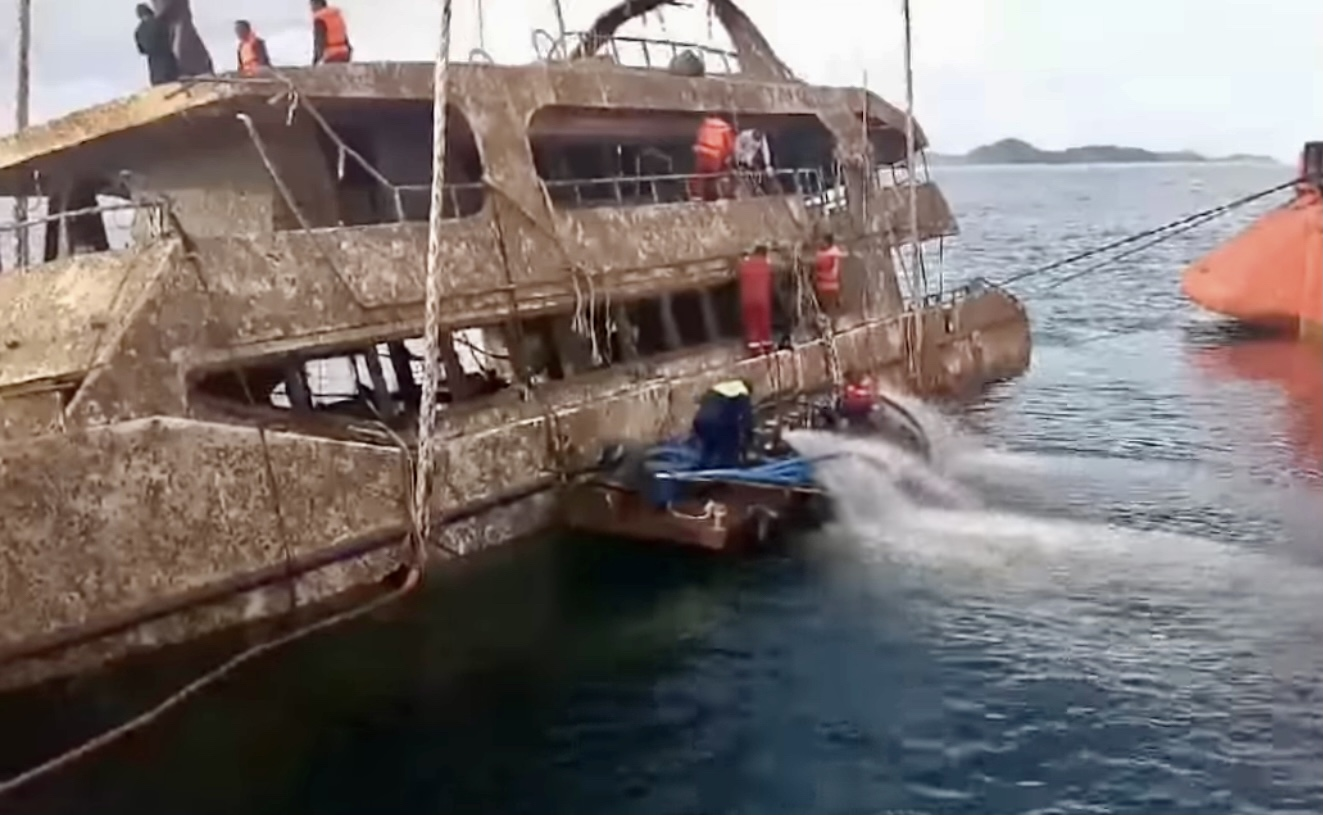
- The capsized boat being lifted from the sea
- Date: 5 July 2018
- Location: Near Phuket, Thailand
- Also known as: Sinking of MV Phoenix and MV Serenita
- Cause: Storm, Substandard Shipbuilding, Permitting Failures
- Deaths: 47
- Injuries: 37

On 5 July 2018, two tourist boats capsized and sank near Phuket, Thailand, during a sudden storm. 46 people died and three were missing, all of whom were on the double-decker ship Phoenix PC Diving, which carried 101 people, including 89 tourists (all but 2 were Chinese nationals). All 42 passengers aboard the second boat, Serenita, were rescued.

== Capsizing of the Phoenix ==
On Thursday 5 July 2018, the double-decker cruise boat Phoenix PC Diving sailed from Phuket, one of the most visited resorts in Thailand, for Koh Racha, a popular snorkeling island off the coast of Phuket. She carried 101 people, including 89 tourists, all but 2 of whom were Chinese nationals, 11 crew members and a tour guide. The boat set off despite a severe weather warning against "strong winds and storms", which had been in effect since 4 July. Survivors reported that the sky was clear at the time of departure, and a number of other boats, including the Serenita, also ignored the warning.

When returning from Koh Racha, the Phoenix was caught in bad weather off the coast of Phuket, with waves reaching 5 meters (16 feet) high. Somjing Boontham, the captain of the Phoenix, said that as the huge waves slammed the boat, his crew members frantically lowered the lifeboats and he urged the passengers to put on their life jackets. Some passengers, including children, made it to the lifeboats, but others were presumed to have been trapped inside the ship when she overturned and sank.

== Search and rescue ==
A fishing trawler nearby arrived at the scene and was able to rescue 48 passengers from the water. Another woman was rescued several miles away from the boat, although several other people found with her were all dead. 37 people were sent to hospitals in Phuket for treatment.

Phuket's provincial government organized a search-and-rescue mission involving helicopters and police and fishing boats. As of 6 July, 33 bodies were found and 23 people were still missing, all Chinese nationals. Most of the passengers found were wearing life jackets.

Diplomats from the Chinese consulate and the embassy in Bangkok rushed to Phuket to visit the survivors and assist with search and rescue. Chinese divers who had gone to northern Thailand to assist in the Tham Luang cave rescue also went to Phuket to search for possible survivors in the sunken ship, which was believed to be 120 feet (37 m) under water.

== Victims ==
As of 12 July, 46 people were confirmed dead and 3 were still missing. All of the dead and missing passengers were Chinese tourists, who constitute more than a quarter of foreign tourists in Thailand. 37 passengers on board the Phoenix were employees and family members of Haipai Furniture Company in Haining, Zhejiang Province. 19 of them were rescued.

== Serenita and other boats ==
Another tourist boat, the Serenita, sank in the same storm near the small island of Koh Mai Thon off Phuket. All of the 42 people on board were rescued. A jet ski also sank and its occupants were rescued. Ten other boats were stranded in the storm on 5 July.

== Thai response ==
Following the Marine Office's announcement that the police would take over the salvage investigation after the contracted salvage team dropped out, Immigration Bureau Maj-Gen Surachate Hakparn said the salvage operation would be completed by 12 November 2018. The salvage, utilizing a crane shipped from Singapore, contains important evidence for upcoming court cases according to the police.

== International impact ==
After the capsizing, it was discovered that the Phoenix was owned by a Chinese tour company, which operated through Thai nominee owners in violation of Thailand's regulations. Strong reactions in both Thai media and Chinese media followed.

Thailand's Deputy Prime Minister Don Pramudwinai stated that the incident happened because "Some Chinese use Thai nominees to bring Chinese tourists in" and they did not heed weather warnings. The Chinese public generally regarded these remarks as distasteful and the remarks generated significant reaction in Chinese domestic media, including calls for boycotts of tourism in Thailand. Don downplayed the remarks, stating that the incident should not affect Thailand-China relations.

Chinese tourism to Phuket dropped significantly in the following months. To increase Chinese tourism, Thailand introduced measures such as waiving visa fees.
