= Songwit Noonpakdee =

Thai military officer

General Songwit Noonpakdee MPCh MVM PGAT DPKT
- ทรงวิทย์ หนุนภักดี
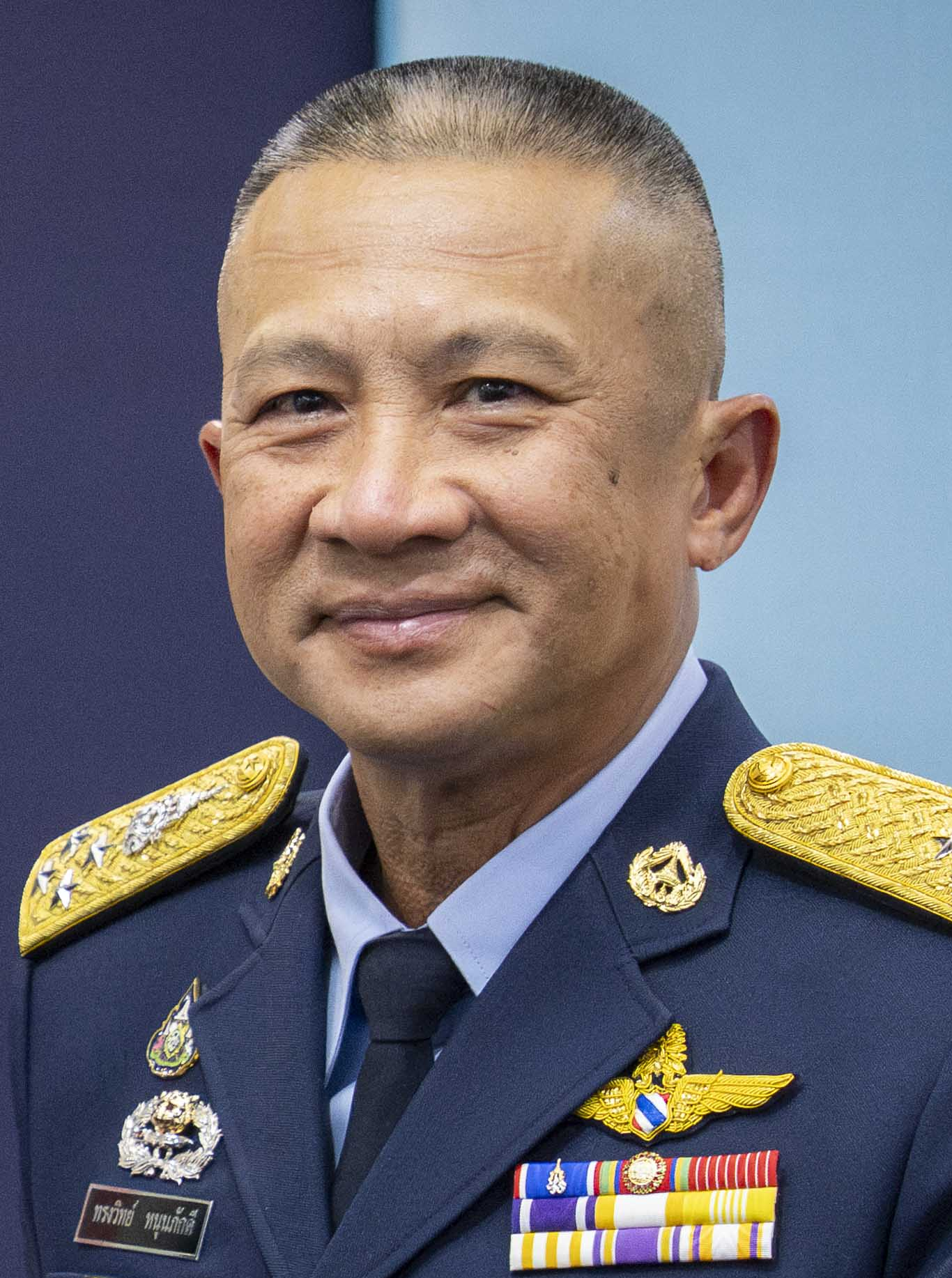

Chief of Defence Forces
- In office 1 October 2023 – 30 September 2025
- Preceded by: Chalermpol Srisawat
- Succeeded by: Ukris Boontanondha

Member of the Senate of Thailand
- Ex officio 17 December 2023 – 10 July 2024
- Preceded by: Chalermpol Srisawat
- Succeeded by: Position abolished

Personal details
- Born: 7 June 1965 (age 61) Ratchaburi, Thailand
- Spouse: Panyada Nuanpakdee
- Parent: Isarapong Noonpakdee (father)
- Education: Armed Forces Academies Preparatory School; Virginia Military Institute (BCE); Florida Institute of Technology (MCE)

Military service
- Allegiance: Thailand
- Branch/service: Royal Thai Army
- Years of service: 1985 – 2025
- Rank: General; Admiral; Air Chief Marshal
- Commands: Chief of Defence Forces; Deputy Chief of the Defence Forces; 1st Division, King's Guard; 11th Infantry Division; 11th King Close Bodyguard Regiment; 3rd King Close Bodyguard Battalion, 11th King Close Bodyguard Regiment; 2nd King Close Bodyguard Battalion, 11th King Close Bodyguard Regiment
- Battles/wars: 2025 Cambodia–Thailand border conflict

Songwit Noonpakdee (Thai: ทรงวิทย์ หนุนภักดี) is a Thai military general. He served as Chief of Defence Forces, the highest-ranking officer and the overall professional head of the Royal Thai Armed Forces, from 1 October 2023 to 30 September 2025. Prior to his assumption to the post, Songwit formerly served as Deputy Chief of the Defence Forces and as commander of the 1st Division, King's Guard, and the 11th King Close Bodyguard Regiment.

== Early life and education ==
Songwit was born in Mueang Ratchaburi district at Ratchaburi province on 7 June 1965 and was born from a military family. His father, General Isarapong Noonpakdee, is a military officer who held various commands, which includes the Commander-in-Chief of the Royal Thai Army, and later became Minister of Interior under then-Prime Minister Anand Panyarachun and his mother is Sumana Nunphakdee. His grandfather was Lt. Gen. Chat Noonpakdee, who formerly served as the Deputy Commissioner of the Metropolitan Police Bureau, and his aunt is Wannee Noonpakdee, the wife of former Prime Minister General Suchinda Kraprayoon. His other uncles include former General Chainarong Noonpakdee, who once served as the Deputy Chief of the Defence Forces; and former General Thaweesak Noonpakdee, who once served as former chairman of the board of the Navanakorn Public Company Limited.

Songwit later entered the Armed Forces Academies Preparatory School and graduated as part of the Class 24 batch of 1985. Songwit later entered the Chulachomklao Royal Military Academy yet wasn't able to complete his studies and later studied at the Virginia Military Institute in Lexington, Virginia, where he earned his Bachelor's Degree in Civil Engineering, and also earned his Master's Degree in Civil Engineering at the Florida Institute of Technology in Melbourne, Florida. Songwit also completed the Command and General Staff Course at the United States Army Command and General Staff College at Fort Leavenworth, Kansas; the Command and General Staff Course at the army Command And General Staff College in Bangkok, the National Defence Course at the National Defence College of Thailand, and the 9th Course on the Rule of Law for Democracy at the College of the Constitutional Court at the Constitutional Court of Thailand.

Songwit also completed the Academy of Business Creativity Course at Sripatum University, the VIP Protection Course at the Diplomatic Security Service in Washington, D.C., USA, and three courses at Fort Benning in Columbus, Georgia: namely the Airborne Course, the Pathfinder Course, and the Ranger Course.

== Career ==
After his graduation from the Armed Forces Preparatory School, Songwit was first became a platoon commander as he held command of the 3rd Long Range Reconnaissance Platoon of the 3rd Infantry Division, and later became company commander of the 1st Long Range Reconnaissance Company of the 1st Division, King's Guard and the Heavy Machine Gun Company of the 21st Infantry Regiment, Queen Sirikit's Guard.

Songwit later served as a professor at the Army Command and General Staff College before being named as battalion commander of two battalions, namely as the battalion commander of the 2nd King Close Bodyguard Battalion of the 11th King Close Bodyguard Regiment, where Then-Colonel Songwit was also credited for his assistance for evacuating the students of the Ramkhamhaeng University amidst the 2013 political crisis. After his term, Songwit later became the battalion commander of the 3rd King Close Bodyguard Battalion, 11th King Close Bodyguard Regiment. During his term as the battalion commander of the 3rd King Close Bodyguard Battalion, Songwit and the battalion paid their respects as part of the King's Guards during the Royal Cremation Ceremony of King Bhumibol Adulyadej.

Songwit was later named as division commander of the 11th Infantry Division and was later named as commander of the 1st Division, King's Guard on 14 March 2018. Songwit was eventually named as Deputy Commander of the 1st Army Area in 2019. Songwit also played a role during the Coronation of King Vajiralongkorn, where he served as the Commander of the Combined Forces during the Royal Land Procession ceremony. Songwit later served as the Deputy Chief of Staff of the Royal Thai Army in 2020, and later became the Chief of Staff of the Commander-in-Chief of the Royal Thai Army, under former Army Commander-in-Chief Narongphan Jitkaewthae from 2021 to 2022. Songwit was later named as the Deputy Chief of the Defence Forces on 2022 to 2024, before he was eventually appointed by then-Caretaker Prime Minister Prayut Chan-o-Cha during his final days in office as the Chief of Defence Forces on 1 October 2023.

In July 2025, Songwit encouraged Cambodian armed forces to withdraw weaponry from the Thailand-Cambodia Border in 2025 Cambodia–Thailand border conflict.

== Other works ==
Songwit also serves as a director of the Bangchak Corporation since 1 October 2021. Songwit also serves as Vice Chairman of the Berli Jucker Public Company Limited and as a member of the Tobacco Authority of Thailand, and was also appointed as President of the National Defence College of Thailand Association under a Royal Patronage since 2023.

== Honours ==
=== Thailand ===
- Knight Grand Cordon of the Order of the Crown of Thailand (2023)
- Knight Grand Cross of the Order of the White Elephant (2020)
- Freemen Safeguarding Medal, Second Class (1992)
- Border Service Medal (1993)
- Chakra Mala Medal (2004)

=== Foreign ===
- Courageous Commander of the Most Gallant Order of Military Service (PGAT) (14 November 2024)
- Grand Commander of the Order of Paduka Keberanian Laila Terbilang (DPKT) (15 July 2025)
- Darjah Utama Bakti Cemerlang (Tentera)
- Officer of the Legion of Merit (1 May 2025)
- Officer of the Legion of Honour
- USSOCOM Medal (6 August 2025)

=== Other awards ===
- United States Army Command and General Staff College International Hall of Fame (3 April 2024)
