= Srisawat =

Srisawat (Thai: ศรีสวัสดิ์, RTGS: Si Sawat) is a Thai surname. Notable people with the surname include:

- Chalermpol Srisawat (born 1963), Thai military general
- Niwat Srisawat (1947–2025), Thai football player
- Tinnakorn Srisawat, known as Rodtang Jitmuangnon (born 1997), Thai professional Muay Thai fighter and kickboxer
