= Don Pramudwinai =

Thai politician and diplomat (born 1950)

- ดอน ปรมัตถ์วินัย
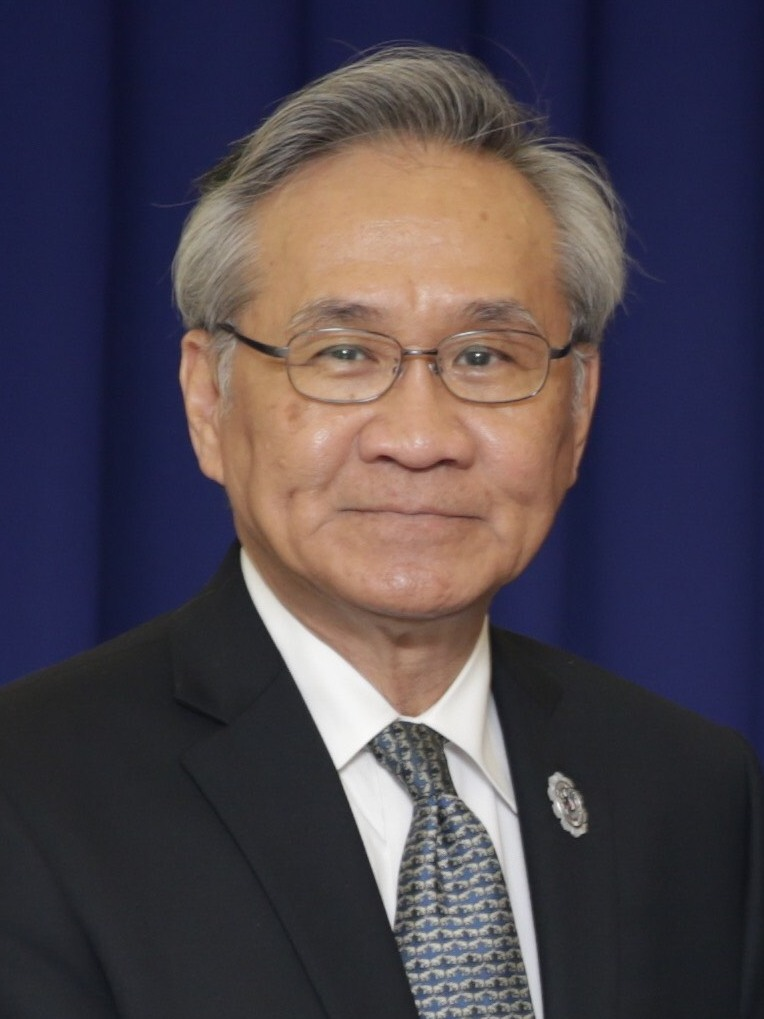
- Don in 2017

Deputy Prime Minister of Thailand
- In office 5 August 2020 – 1 September 2023
- Prime Minister: Prayut Chan-o-cha

Minister of Foreign Affairs
- In office 19 August 2015 – 1 September 2023
- Prime Minister: Prayut Chan-o-cha
- Preceded by: Thanasak Patimaprakorn
- Succeeded by: Parnpree Bahiddha-nukara

Deputy Minister of Foreign Affairs
- In office 30 August 2014 – 19 August 2015
- Prime Minister: Prayut Chan-o-cha
- Minister: Thanasak Patimaprakorn

Personal details
- Born: 25 January 1950 (age 76) Bangkok, Thailand
- Party: Independent
- Spouse: Narirat Pramudwinai
- Children: 1
- Education: UCLA; Tufts University
- Profession: Diplomat; politician

Don Pramudwinai (Thai: ดอน ปรมัตถ์วินัย, RTGS: Don Poramatwinai, IPA: [dɔːn pɔː.rá.mát.wí.naj]; born 25 January 1950) is a Thai diplomat and politician who was a Deputy Prime Minister and Minister of Foreign Affairs of Thailand from 2015 to 2023 under Prime Minister Prayut Chan-o-cha government. He previously served as the ambassador of Thailand to the United States.

== Early life and education ==
Don attended Wat Suthiwararam and Suankularb Wittayalai Schools. As an undergraduate he studied at the Faculty of Political Science, Chulalongkorn University (1967–1968).

He received a BA in political science and an MA in international relations from University of California (UCLA). He also received an MA in international relations from The Fletcher School at Tufts University.

== Diplomatic career ==
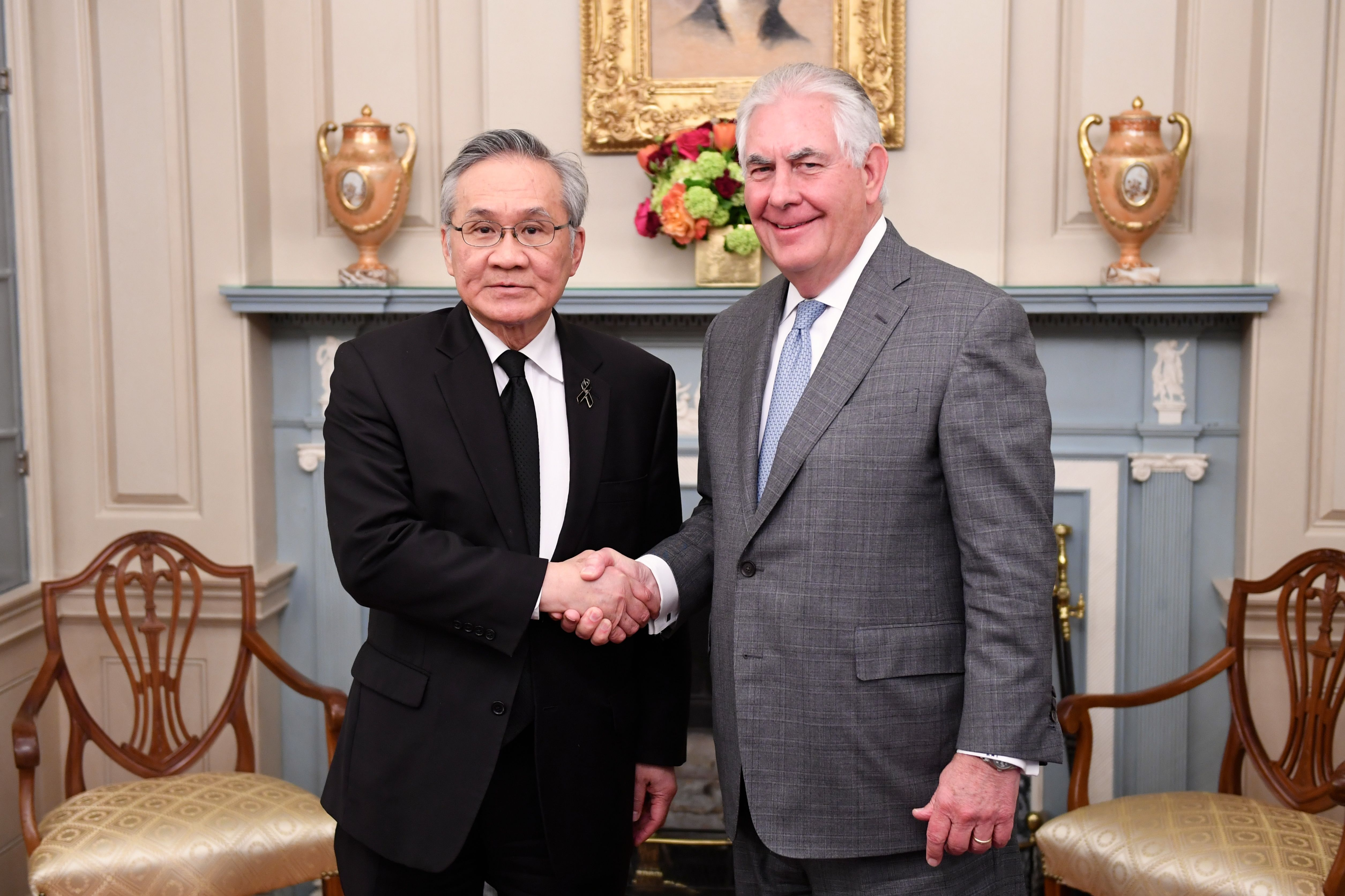
Pramudipwinai and US Secretary of State Rex Tillerson

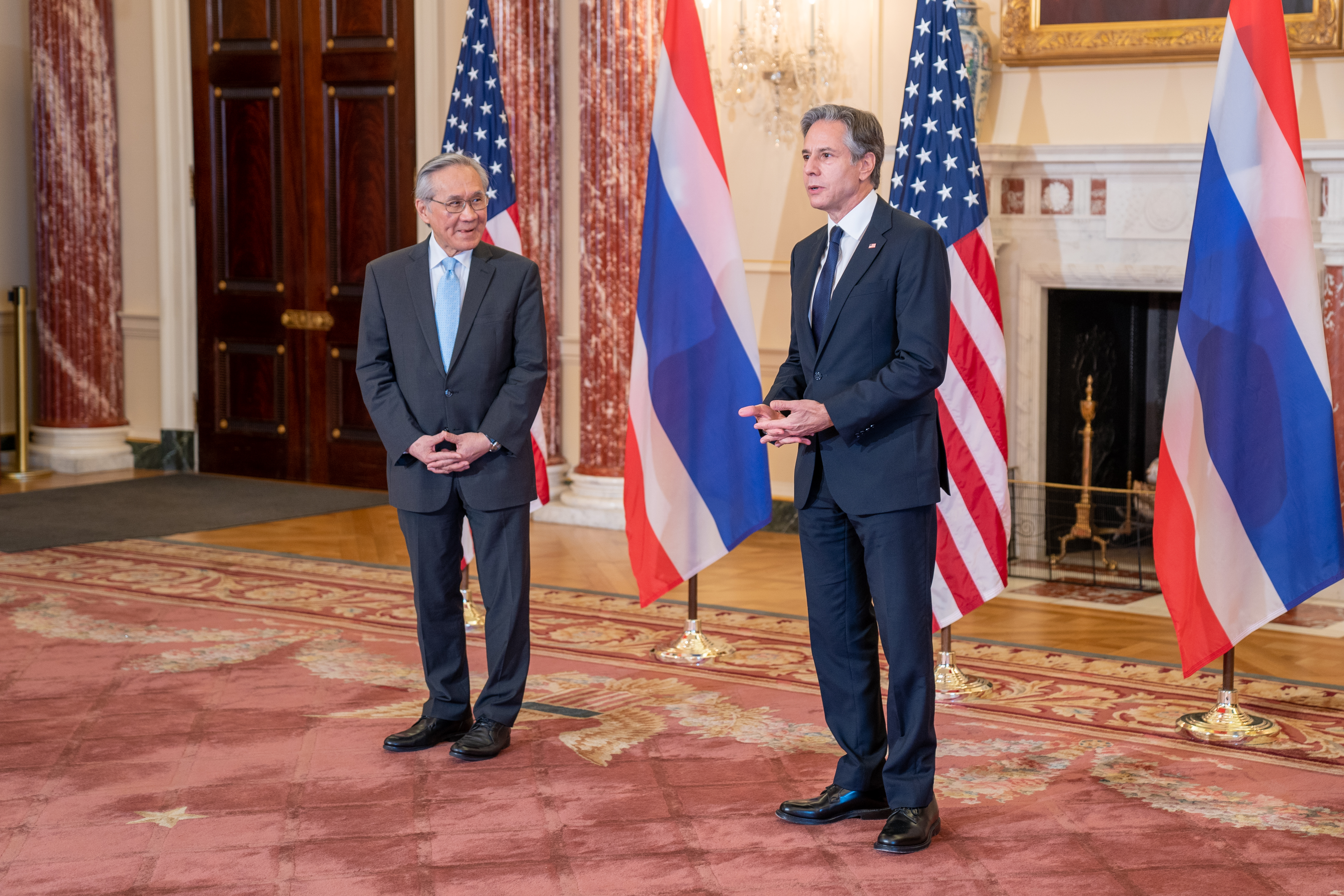
Pramudwinai and U.S. Secretary of State Antony Blinken in September 2021

Don Pramudwinai joined the Ministry of Foreign Affairs in 1974. In 1992 he was appointed director-general of the Department of East Asian Affairs. From 1994 to 1998 he was posted as Thailand's ambassador to Switzerland, Vatican City, and Liechtenstein. From 1999 to 2000 he was the Foreign Ministry spokesperson. From 2000 to 2004 he served as ambassador to China, North Korea, and Mongolia. From 2004 to 2007 he served as ambassador to the European Union. From 2007 until 2009 he served as permanent representative to the United Nations in New York. From 2009 until 2010 he served as ambassador to the United States.

== Political career ==
In 2014 he was appointed deputy foreign minister to Foreign Minister Thanasak Patimaprakorn, and in 2015 was elevated to minister of foreign affairs.

Following the 2018 Phuket boat capsizing, Don stated that the incident happened because "Some Chinese use Thai nominees to bring Chinese tourists in" and they did not heed weather warnings. The Chinese public generally regarded these remarks as distasteful and the remarks generated significant reaction in Chinese domestic media, including calls for boycotts of tourism in Thailand. Don downplayed the remarks, stating that the incident should not affect Thailand-China relations. Chinese tourism to Phuket dropped significantly in the following months. To increase Chinese tourism, Thailand introduced measures such as waiving visa fees.

In an August 2020 Cabinet reshuffle, he was also appointed as deputy prime minister in addition to his position as minister of foreign affairs.

In 2022 Don has been instrumental in pushing for the restoration of Thai-Saudi relations, this marks the first high-level visit in three decades between the two countries.

== Awards and honors ==
- 1998: Knight Grand Cordon of the Most Noble Order of the Crown of Thailand
- 2003: Knight Grand Cordon of the Most Exalted Order of the White Elephant
- 2004: Knight Commander of the Most Illustrious Order of Chula Chom Klao
