= Songkitti Jaggabatara =

Thai general

- ทรงกิตติ จักกาบาตร์
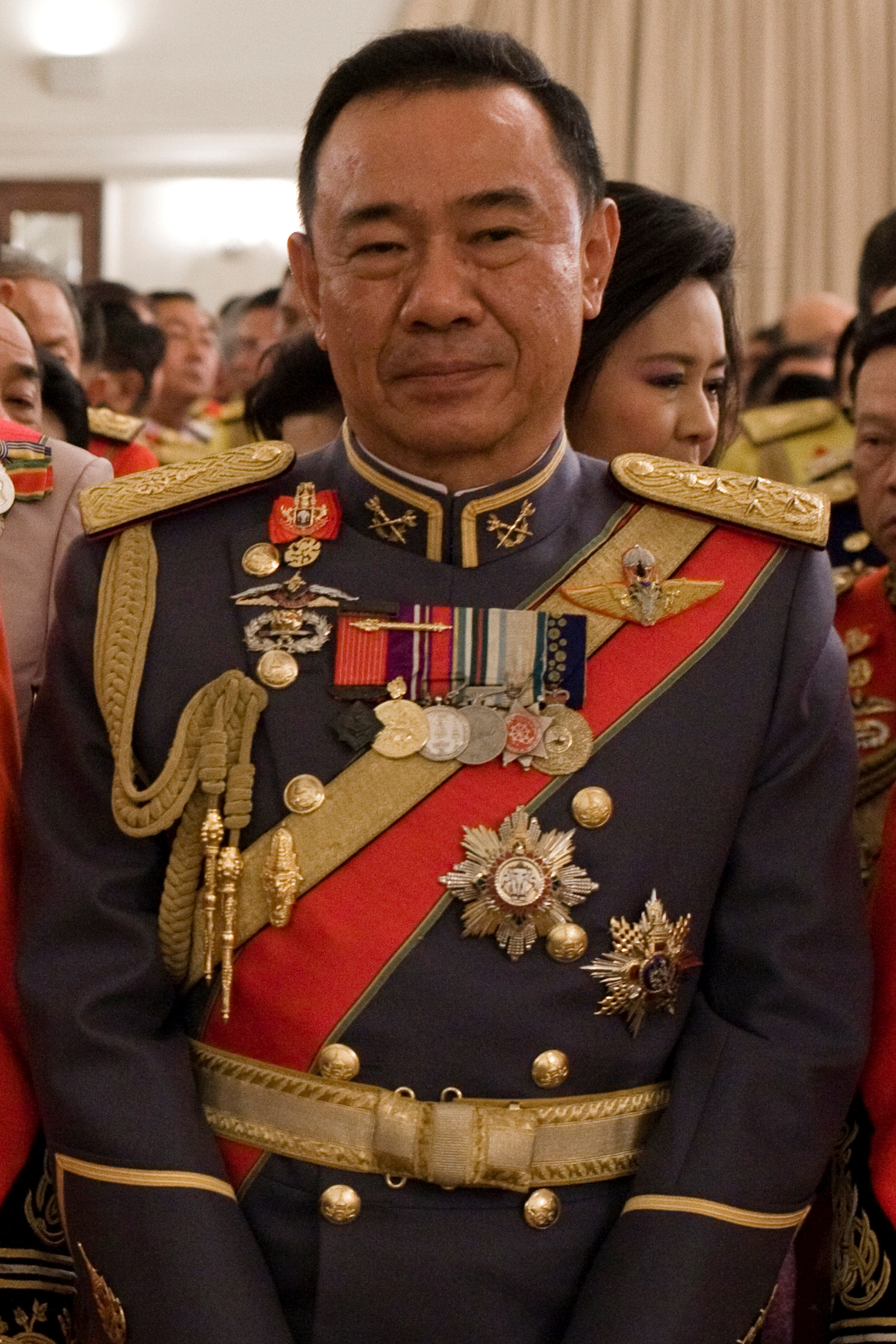
- Songkitti Jaggabatara in full dress uniform of 1st Cavalry Regiment, King's Guard (2011)
- Born: 22 December 1950 (age 75); Nakhon Ratchasima, Thailand
- Military career
- Allegiance: Thailand
- Branch: Royal Thai Army
- Service years: 1972–2011
- Rank: General
- Nickname: Tui (Thai: ตุ้ย)
- Commands: Chief of Defence Forces; Superintendent Chulacholklao Royal Military Academy; Commanding-General 4th Army Area; Commander of Thai Joint Task Force 972 Thai/East Timor and Deputy Commander of International Force East Timor; Company Commander of 3rd Recon Squadron, King's Guard; Platoon leader of the 3rd Recon Squadron, King's Guard
- Conflicts: Cold War; Communist insurgency in Thailand; 1999 East Timorese crisis; International Force East Timor

General Songkitti Jaggabatara (Thai: ทรงกิตติ จักกาบาตร์; RTGS: Songkitti Chakkabat; born December 22, 1950) was the Chief of Defence Forces, Royal Thai Armed Forces Headquarters (CDF, RTARF) from October 1, 2008 until his retirement from active service on October 1, 2011.

== Military life ==
General Songkitti was educated in many schools in various parts of Thailand before attending the Armed Forces Academies Preparatory School Class 10 as a pre-cadet in 1967 as a prerequisite for attending Chulachomklao Royal Military Academy (CRMA). In 1977 he graduated from CRMA as a cavalry officer. In the early years of his service, he fought in the war, in north of Thailand, with communist insurgency who had begun the low intensity armed struggle in the South, North and Northeast Thailand. He also served on the Thailand-Cambodian border during 1982 when the border situation there was very tense after Vietnam invaded Cambodia in 1978. In 2003, he commanded the 4th Army Area for 6 months and became Superintendent of CRMA. Before he was appointed Chief of Defence Forces, he was Chief of Joint Staff, RTARF.

In April 2009, he was appointed by Prime Minister Abhisit Vejjajiva as the Director of Centre for the Resolution of the Emergency Situation (CRES) with mandate to peacefully resolve political unrest by National United Front of Democracy Against Dictatorship, also known as "Red Shirt" movement, a political pressure group supporting Thaksin Shinawatra, in Bangkok during April 2009.

== Peacekeeping Mission in East Timor ==
General Songkitti came to international fame in 1999 when, as a Major General, he led the Thai Joint Task Force 972 Thai/East Timor as a military contingent from Thailand contributed to the International Force for East Timor (INTERFET). He was, concurrently, second in command of INTERFET while Major General Peter Cosgrove, from Australia, was the commander. In 2000, he was awarded Honorary Member (AM) in the Order of Australia in the Military Division and the INTERFET MEDAL for his exceptional service to the INTERFET.

Later in November 2002, he accepted the invitation from University of Melbourne, Australia to share his views from the operations in the seminar on The Rule of Law on Peace Operations.

== Personal life ==
General Songkitti Jaggabatara is married with two adult daughters and one teenage son. He lives in Bangkok.

== Honours ==
=== Royal decorations ===
- Knight Grand Cordon (Special Class) of the Most Exalted Order of the White Elephant
- Knight Grand Cordon (Special Class) of The Most Noble Order of the Crown of Thailand
- Freemen Safeguarding Medal (Second Class, Second Category)
- Border Service Medal
- Chakra Mala Medal
- Boy Scout Citation Medal of Vajira First Class

=== Foreign honours ===
- Australia :
  - Honorary Member in the Order of Australia
  - INTERFET MEDAL
- Malaysia :
  - Courageous Commander of The Most Gallant Order of Military Service
- Indonesia :
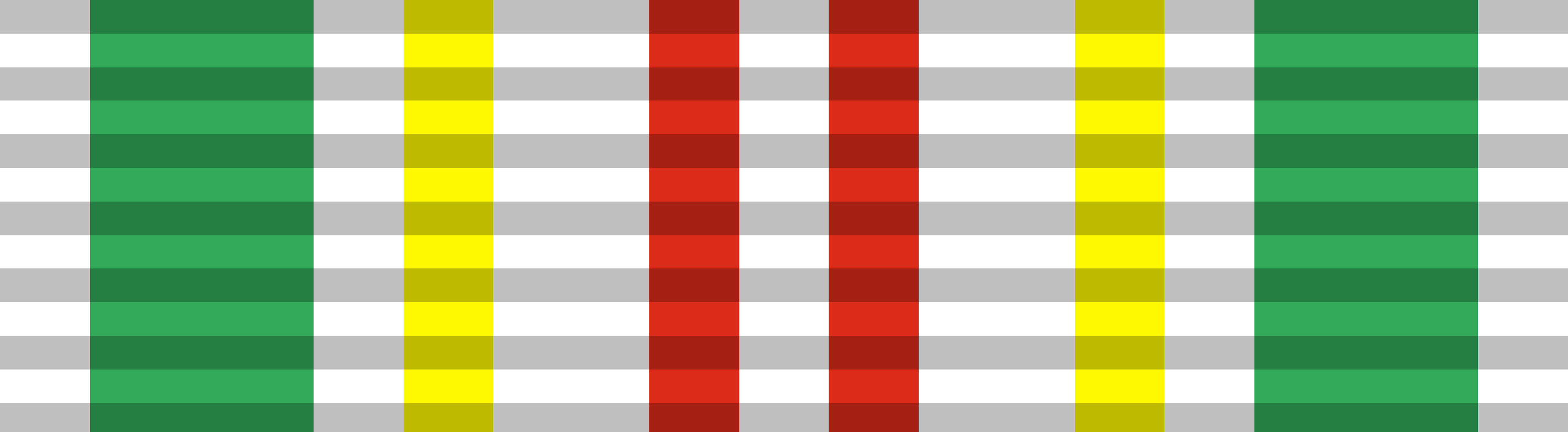
  - Bintang Yudha Dharma Utama (Indonesia)
- Brunei :
  - The Most Exalted Order of Paduka Keberanian Laila Terbilang, First Class
- Singapore :
  - Distinguished Service Order (Military)
