= Ministry of Defence (Thailand) =

Government ministry of Thailand

- กระทรวงกลาโหม
- Emblem of the Ministry of Defence

- Flag of the Ministry of Defence

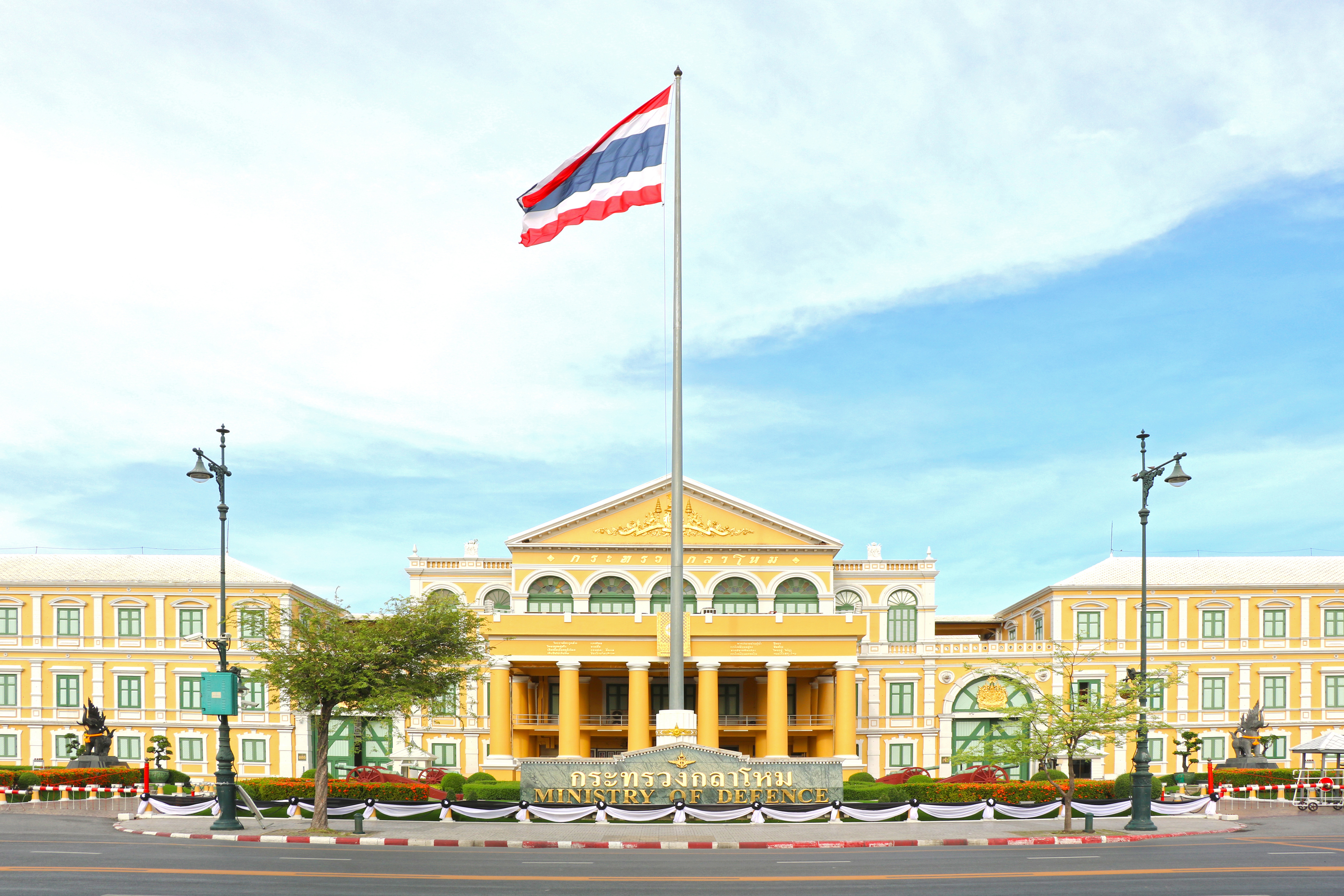
- Ministry of Defence HQ building, opposite Temple of the Emerald Buddha

Ministry overview
- Formed: 8 April 1887; 139 years ago
- Jurisdiction: Government of Thailand
- Headquarters: Ministry of Defence HQ, Phra Nakhon, Bangkok; 13.7517°N 100.4942°E
- Annual budget: 233,300 million baht (FY2020)
- Minister responsible: Adul Boonthamcharoen
- Deputy Minister responsible: Vacant
- Ministry executive: Gen.Tharapong Malakham, Permanent Secretary
- Website: Official website

The Ministry of Defence (Abrv: MOD; Thai: กระทรวงกลาโหม; RTGS: Krasuang Kalahom; It is assumed that the word Kalahom may directly translate to Ministry of Places of Fire Worship.), is a cabinet-level government department of the Kingdom of Thailand. The ministry controls and manages the Royal Thai Armed Forces to maintain national security, territorial integrity, and national Defence. The armed forces of Thailand are composed of three branches: the Royal Thai Army, Royal Thai Navy, and Royal Thai Air Force.

Although the King of Thailand is the Head of the Royal Thai Armed Forces (Thai: จอมทัพไทย), his position is only nominal. The ministry and the forces are administered by an appointed politician, the Minister of Defence, a member of the Cabinet of Thailand.

== History ==
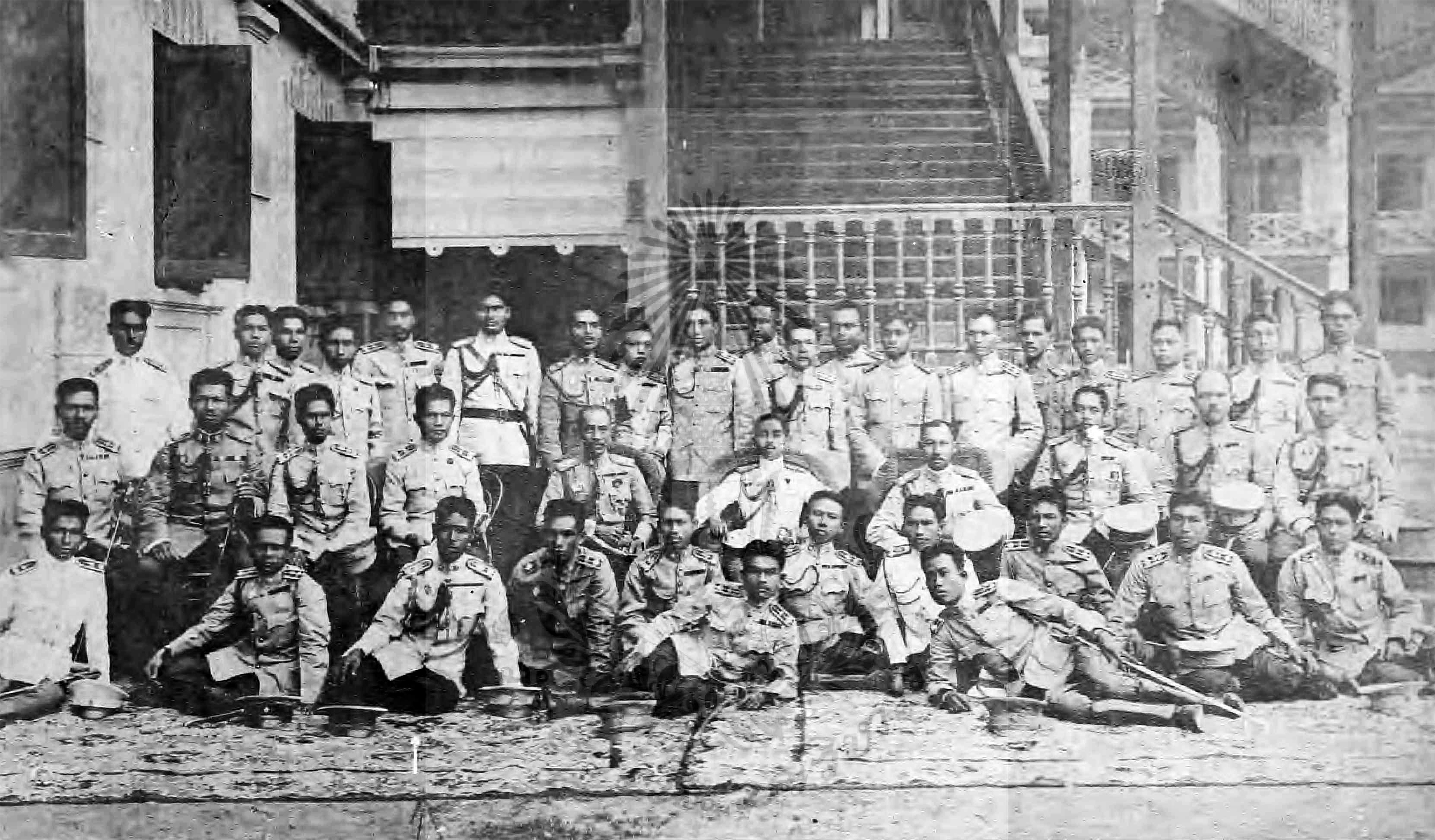
Military training course at the Ministry of Defence HQ with the supervision of Prince Chakrabongse Bhuvanath (centre) in 1963

Initially, the Ministry was called Krom Kalahom (Thai: กรมกลาโหม) and its head was called Samuha Kalahom (Thai: สมุหกลาโหม), and it was charged with the protection of the southern border. It was founded in the Ayutthaya period and was retained throughout the Rattanakosin period. The ministry in its current design was formed in 1887, by the order of King Chulalongkorn, to create a permanent military command. This was a result of the increasing threat posed by Western powers. The ministry was first housed in an old horse-and-elephant stable opposite the Grand Palace. A new European-style building was erected to house it. At first the ministry only commanded the army (founded in 1847), but then it incorporated the navy (founded in 1887), and finally, the air force (founded in 1913).

In 1914, King Vajiravudh determined that the act providing for invoking martial law, first promulgated by his father in 1907, was not consistent with modern laws of war nor convenient for the preservation of the external or internal security of the state, so it was changed to the modern form that, with minor amendments, continues to be in force.

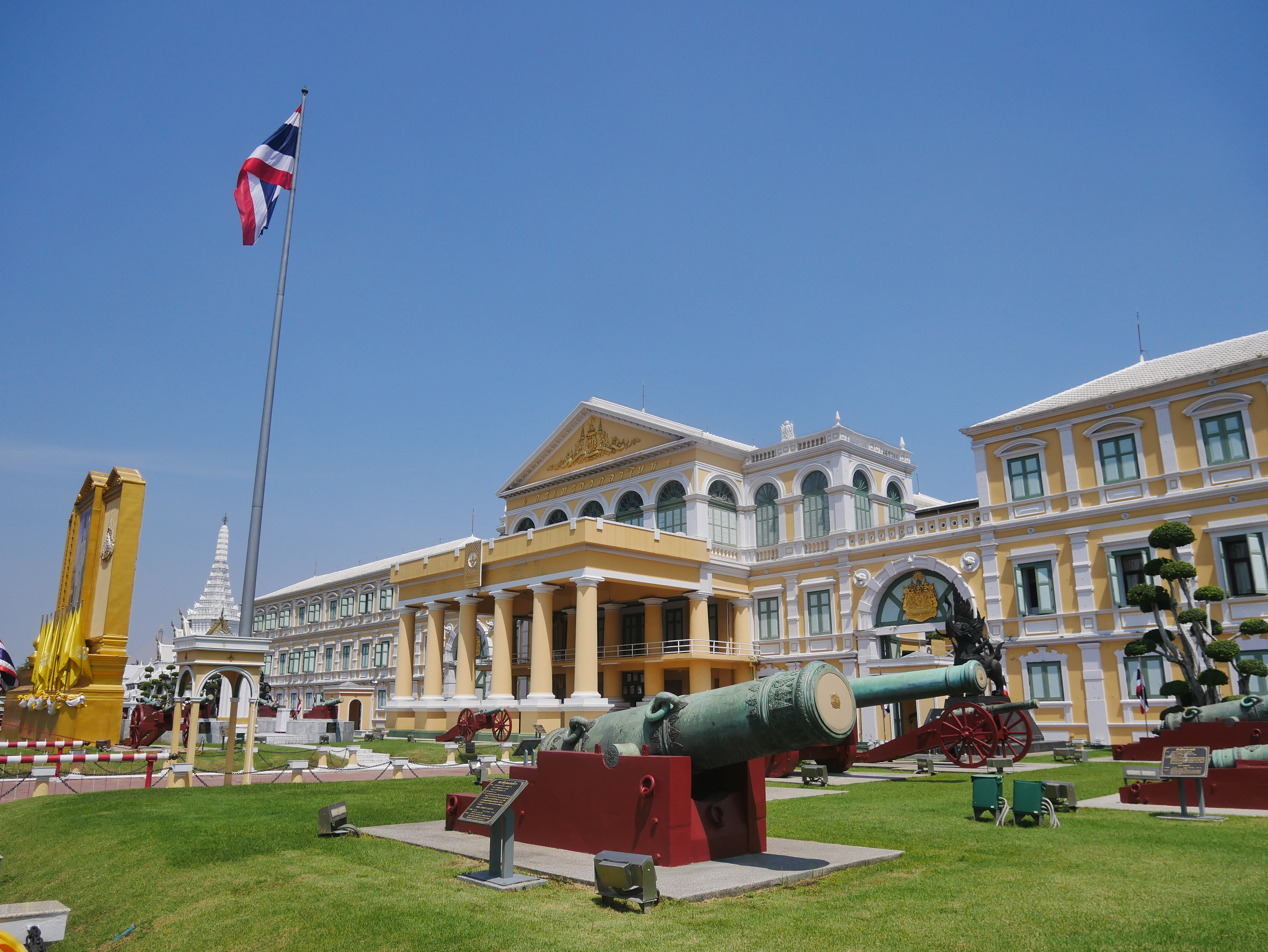
Ministry of Defence HQ at Sanam Chai Road, Bangkok

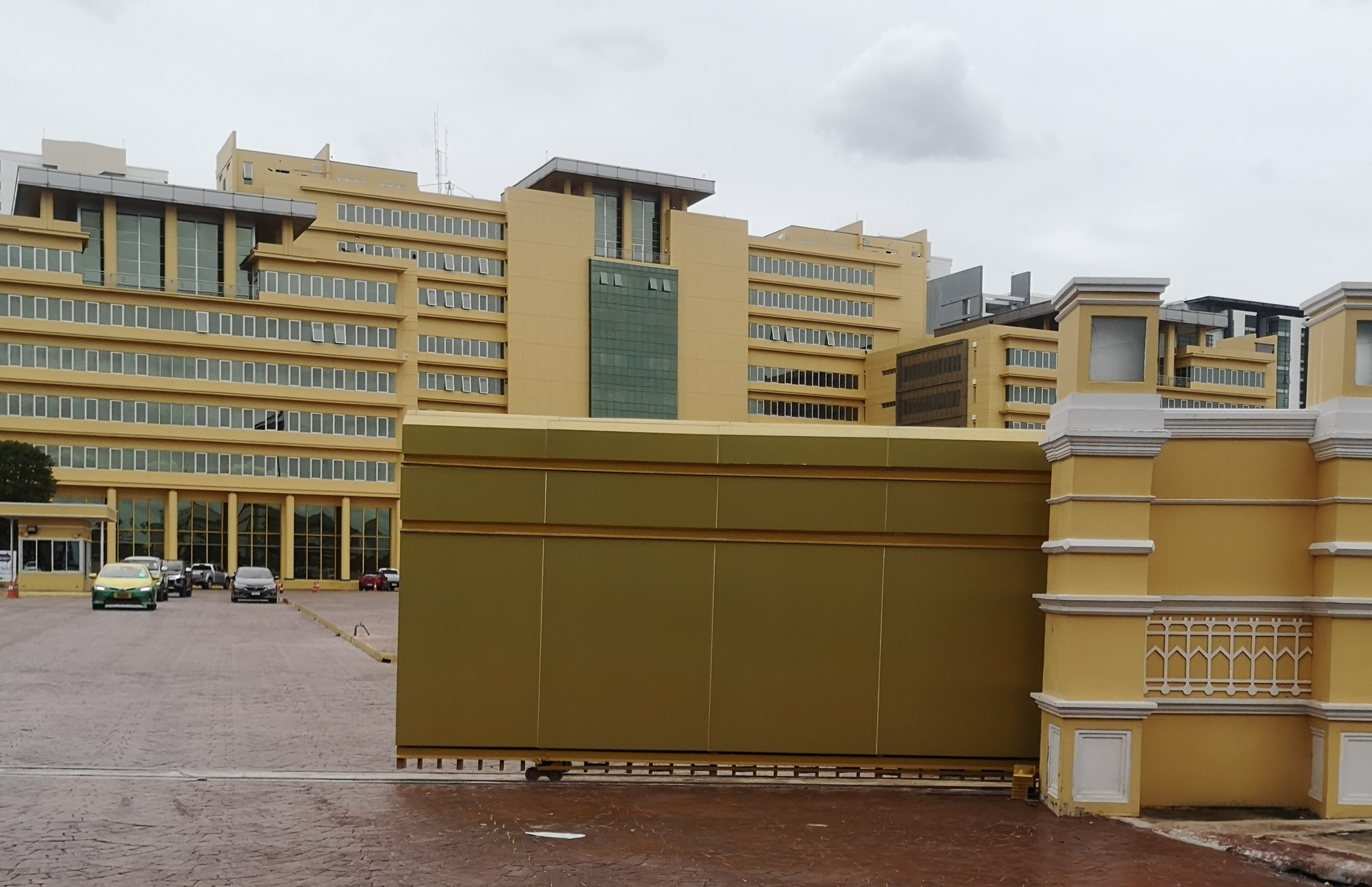
Office of the Permanent Secretary for Defence at Si Saman Rd., Nonthaburi

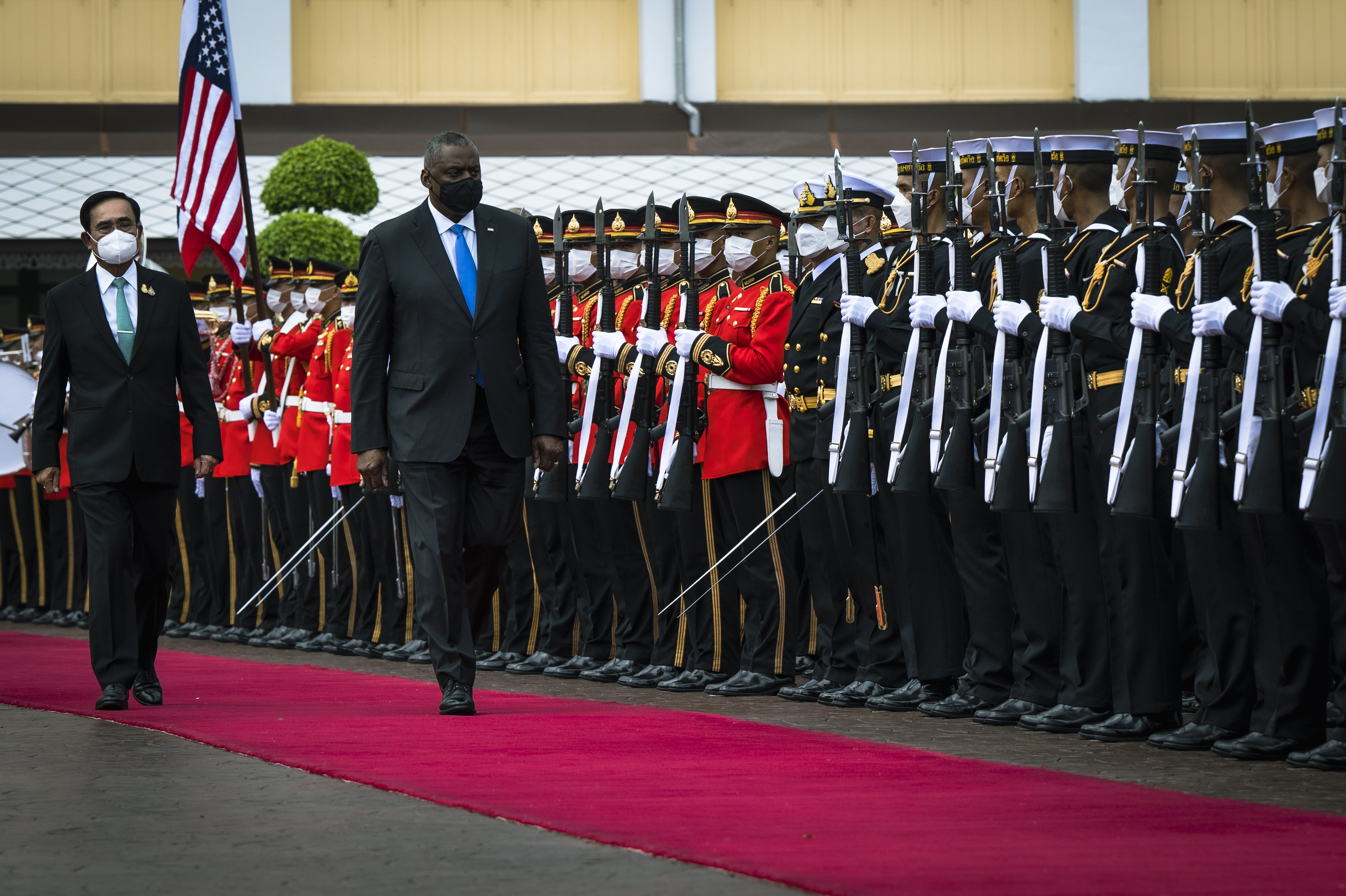
Prime Minister and Minister of Defence Prayut Chan-o-cha welcomes Secretary of Defense Lloyd J. Austin III at Ministry of Defence HQ in 2022

== Structure ==
=== Ministry level ===
- Minister: Adul Boonthamcharoen
  - Deputy Minister: Vacant
    - Permanent Secretary: General Tharapong Malakham

=== Royal Thai Armed Forces HQ level ===
- Royal Thai Armed Forces Headquarters
  - Chief of Defence Forces: General Songwit Noonpakdee

=== Royal Thai Armed Forces level ===
- Royal Thai Army
  - Commander-in-Chief: General Phana Khlaeoplotthuk
- Royal Thai Navy
  - Commander-in-Chief: Admiral Jirapol Wongwit
- Royal Thai Air Force
  - Commander-in-Chief: Air Chief Marshal Punpakdee Pattanakul

== Departments ==
=== Departmental organisation ===
- Office of Minister of Ministry Of Defence
- Office of the Permanent Secretary for Ministry Of Defence
- Royal Thai Armed Forces and Royal Thai Armed Forces Headquarters

=== Other agencies ===
- Defence Technology Institute (Public Organisation)
- The War Veterans Department
- Bangkok Dock Company

== Budget ==
Thai Department of Defence Budget (million baht)
Organisation	FY2018	FY2019	FY2020
Office of the Permanent Secretary	9,250	10,063	10,300
Headquarters	16,802	17,352	17,900
Defence Technology Organization	1,227	1,240	1,300
Army	107,457	111,377	113,700
Navy	43,835	45,485	47,300
Air Force	39,931	41,609	42,900
Totals	218,503	227,127	233,300

The military augments its budgets through its ownership of golf courses, racetracks, boxing stadia, and radio and television stations.
