= National Defence College of Thailand =

Advanced military training academy

Coordinates: 13°46′47″N 100°33′26″E

- Type: Military Academy
- Established: February 2, 1955
- Chancellor: Lt.Gen. Thaksin Sirisingha
- Vice-Chancellor: Maj.Gen. Arkdet Prateep-Usanon
- Students: senior military officers and civilians
- Location: Din Daeng district, Bangkok, Thailand
- Website: Website of the National Defence College

The National Defence College of Thailand or NDC (Thai: วิทยาลัยป้องกันราชอาณาจักร; RTGS: Witthayalai Pongkan Ratcha-anachak) is an education organization that provides advanced training for both senior military officers and civilians. It is operated by the National Defence Studies Institute Royal Thai Armed Forces Headquarters of the Ministry of Defence.

== History ==
The NDC was founded in on 2 February 1955 by Field Marshal Plaek Phibunsongkhram by opening the study for top executives of the military and civilian sectors only. Later in 1989, the National Defense Course for the Joint State-Private Sector was opened so that business executives at the level of business owners or executives have been educated with senior executives of the government. In 2003, opened the National Defense Course for national, private, and political by accepting more politicians.

Currently, this course is not open to study. With the requirements of those who will be considered for this study if being a civil servant must be a high-level director or equivalent or higher, If being a military officer must have a rank of Colonel, Captain, Group Captain up and if being a police officer must have a Police Colonel rank.

== See also ==
- Royal Thai Armed Forces Headquarters
- Ministry of Defence
