= Royal Thai Armed Forces Headquarters =

Joint headquarters of Thai armed forces

- กองบัญชาการกองทัพไทย
- Emblem of the Headquarters
- Active: 1957–present
- Country: Thailand
- Branch: Royal Thai Army; Royal Thai Navy; Royal Thai Air Force
- Type: Command
- Part of: Ministry of Defence
- Headquarters: Chaeng Watthana Rd. Lak Si, Bangkok

Commanders
- Chief of Defence Forces: General Ukris Boontanondha

Insignia
- Flag

- Unit colour (use the same colour as RTA)

The Royal Thai Armed Forces Headquarters (Thai: กองบัญชาการกองทัพไทย) (RTARF HQ), is the joint headquarters of the Royal Thai Armed Forces, which is composed of the Royal Thai Army, the Royal Thai Navy and the Royal Thai Air Force. Formerly the Supreme Command Headquarters, the name was changed in February 2008.

The headquarters is headed by the Chief of Defence Forces. The chief is supported by several departments and directorates, including four deputy chiefs. The headquarters is under the responsibility of the Ministry of Defence of Thailand and the Defence Minister.

== Function ==
The headquarters is the supreme command of the armed forces and therefore at the apex of the military in Thailand. The headquarters is charged with the command and execution of military operations in wartime. In peacetime, it is charged with maintaining military readiness in case of attack. The headquarters is also in charge of the security of the royal family and the king. In addition to the command of the armed forces during times of war, the headquarters also commands Thai forces overseas in peacekeeping and humanitarian assistance operations.

== History ==
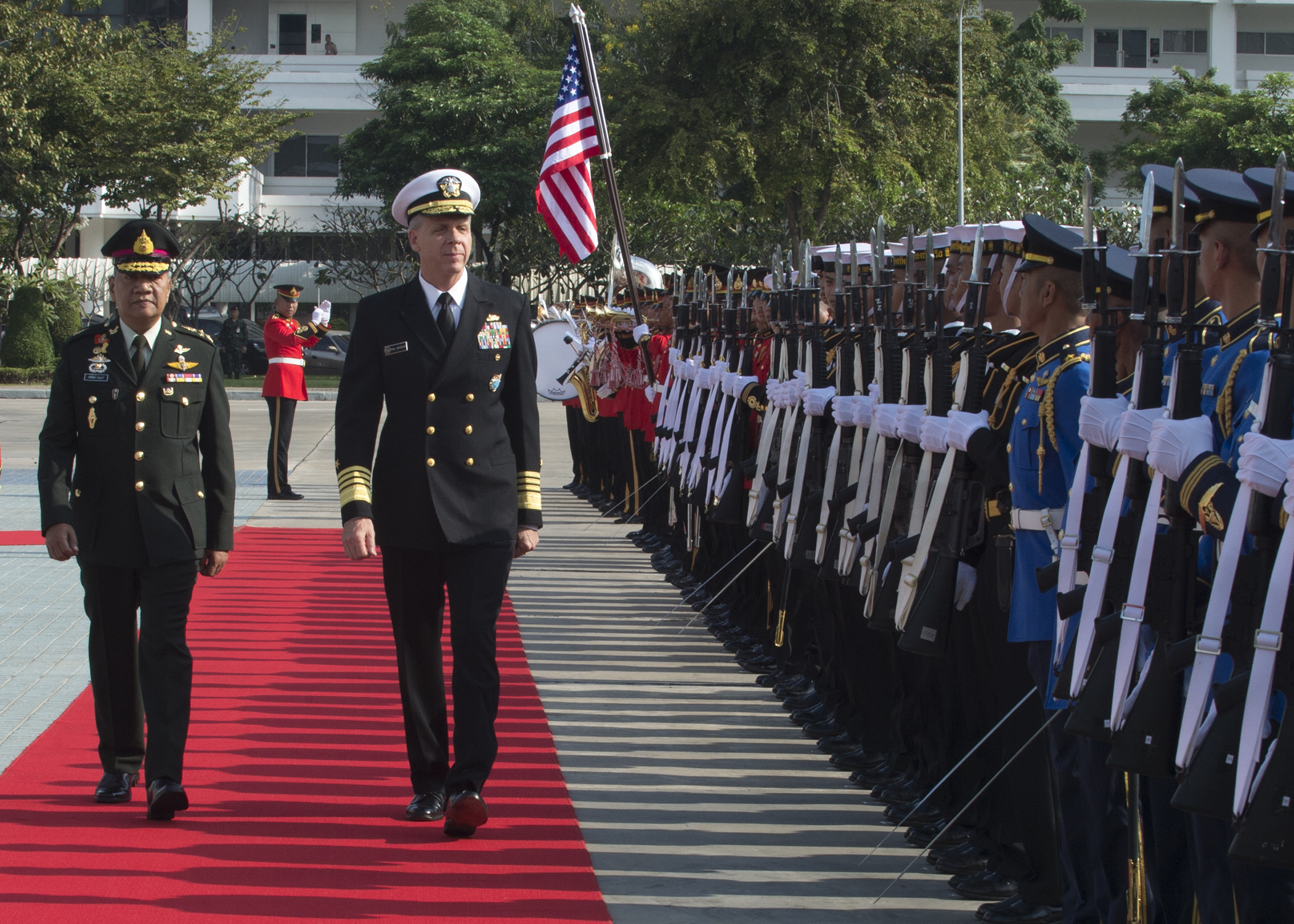
Honors ceremony at parade ground inside the Headquarters

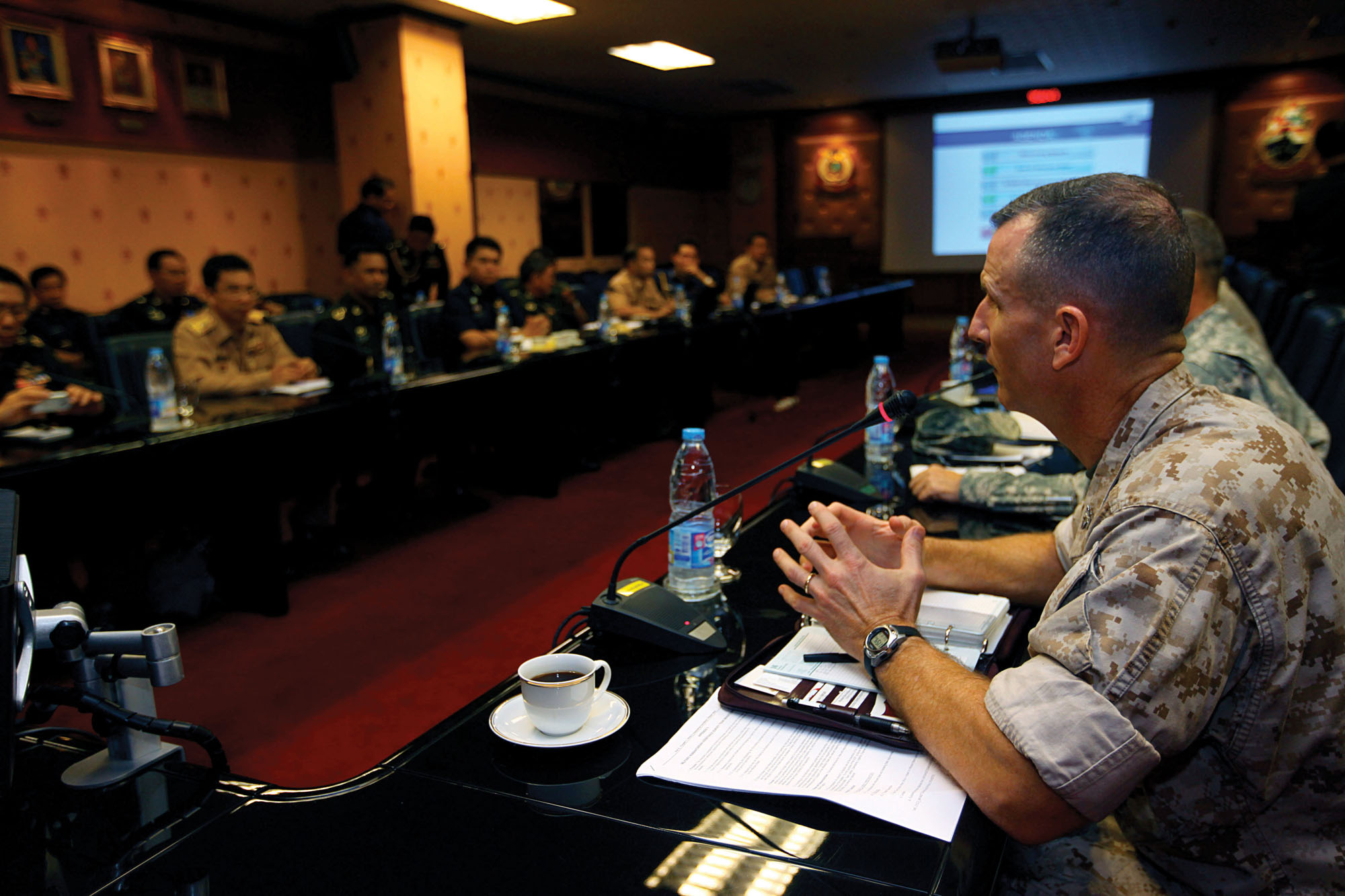
Situation room inside the Headquarters

=== Temporary command ===
The Supreme Command Headquarters of the Royal Thai Armed Forces was originally a temporary position that had only been called into existence twice: once, during the Franco-Thai War in 1940 and again during the Greater East Asia War (Second World War: Pacific Theatre). During both of these conflicts, the headquarters was commanded by Field Marshal Plaek Pibulsonggram, the prime minister of Thailand and creator of the supreme command system. Temporary personnel were called from their existing units and released after conflict subsided in 1945.

=== Permanent command ===
On 27 September 1957, King Bhumibol Adulyadej as Commander-in-Chief and Head of the Royal Thai Armed Forces (Thai: จอมทัพไทย), appointed Field Marshal Sarit Thanarat to the position of Supreme Commander. The Defence Staff Department was also created to serve as the commander's administrative office. Field Marshal Sarit became Prime Minister in 1959 and subsequently relinquished command of the Supreme Command Headquarters on his deathbed in 1963. He was succeeded by Thanom Kittikachorn.

During the 1960s, the government saw the establishment of the permanent Supreme Command Headquarters as a necessity for the preparation of military forces and national defense. On 16 March 1960, the passage of the "Organization of Ministry of Defence Act of 1960" upgraded the Defence Staff Department to Supreme Command Headquarters. This action originally created four groups of agencies within the Supreme Command Headquarters: Staff, Special Services, Combat Support, and Education. The Supreme Command Headquarters is currently organized into five groups: the Command Group, the Joint Staff Group, the Operations Group, the Special Services Group, and the Education Group.

Until 2008, The Supreme Command Headquarters also has operational control of the Border Patrol Police.

=== Reform ===
On 2 February 2008, the "Supreme Command Headquarters" became the "Royal Thai Armed Forces Headquarters" under the "Organization of Ministry of Defence Act, 2008". The position of Supreme Commander became the Chief of Defence Forces.

== Departments ==
The RTARF HQ is composed of five groups:

=== Command Group ===
- Office of the Headquarters
- Office of the Secretary
- Office of Inspector General
- Office of Internal Audit
- Office of Judge Advocate General
- Office of Welfare
- Office of Inspector General
- Office of Post Engineer
- Thailand Mine Action Center
- Royal Thai Armed Forces Cyber Command
- Joint Capabilities Command (JCC)

=== Joint Staff Group ===
- Directorate of Joint Personnel
- Directorate of Joint Intelligence
- Directorate of Joint Operations
- Directorate of Joint Logistics
- Directorate of Joint Civil Affairs
- Directorate of Joint Communications
- Office of the Comptroller General

=== Operations Group ===
- Armed Forces Development Command
  - Office of Royal Development Projects
- Armed Forces Security Center (AFSC)
  - Armed Force Security School
- Counter Terrorist Operations Center (CTOC)

=== Special Services Group ===
- Adjutant General's Department
- Finance Department
- Royal Thai Survey Department
- Support Service Department
- Military Information Technology Department
- Department of Border Affairs

=== Education Group ===
- National Defence Studies Institute
  - National Defence College of Thailand
  - Joint War Collage
  - Armed Forces Academies Preparatory School
  - Military Technical Training School

== Commanders ==
=== Chiefs of Defence Forces ===
The "Chief of Defence Forces" (Thai: ผู้บัญชาการทหารสูงสุด) and the Deputy Chiefs of Defence Forces (Thai: รองผู้บัญชาการทหารสูงสุด) are responsible for the command and execution of military operations of the armed forces of Thailand.
