= Jirapol Wongwit =

Thai naval officer (born 1965)

Admiral Jirapol Wongwit P.C. , M.V.M.
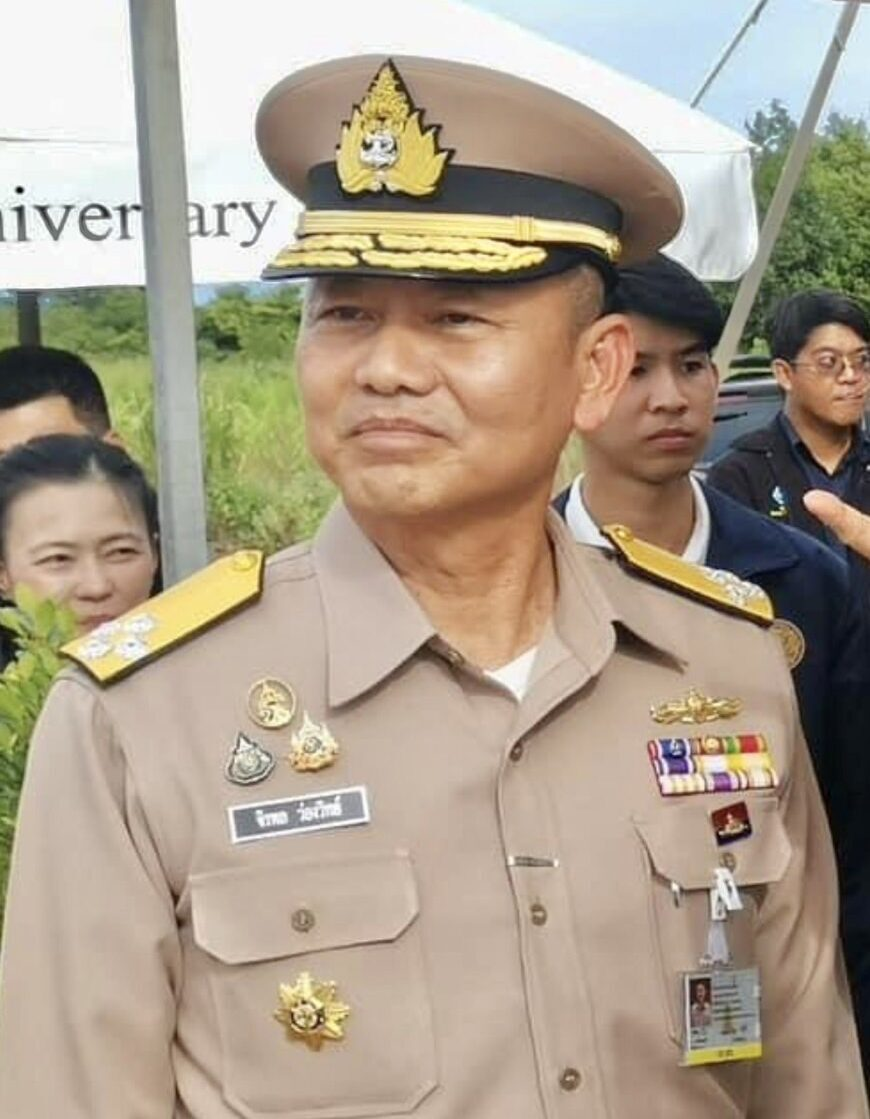

Commander-in-Chief of the Royal Thai Navy
- In office 1 October 2024 – 30 September 2025
- Preceded by: Adung Phan-iam
- Succeeded by: Pairote Fuengchan

Personal details
- Born: April 4, 1965 (age 60) Sala Thammasop Subdistrict, Thawi Watthana District, Bangkok, Thailand
- Spouse: Jirawat Krisanaphan Wongwit

Military service
- Allegiance: Thailand
- Branch/service: Royal Thai Navy
- Rank: Admiral
- Battles/wars: 2025 Cambodia–Thailand border conflict

Jirapol Wongwit (Thai: จิรพล ว่องวิทย์; born 4 April 1965) is a retired Royal Thai Navy officer who served as the Commander-in-Chief of the Royal Thai Navy from 2024 to 2025.

== Biography ==
Admiral Jirapol Wongwit, known by his nickname "Maew", was born on April 4, 1965, in Sala Thammasop Subdistrict, Thawi Watthana District, Bangkok, Thailand.

=== Education ===
- Armed Forces Academies Preparatory School, Class 24
- Mürwik Naval School, Germany
- National Defence College, China

== Military career ==
During his service in the Royal Thai Navy, Jirapol held several key positions:

- Commanding officer of HTMS Prasae
- Commanding officer of HTMS Sukhothai (2020)
- Deputy Director of Naval Education Department
- Special Advisor to the Royal Thai Navy (2023)
- Chairman of the Eastern Economic Corridor (EEC) Development Committee for the Navy
- Appointed as the 58th Commander-in-Chief of the Royal Thai Navy in 2024

== 2025 Cambodia–Thailand clashes ==
=== Military preparations and border closures ===
On 24 July 2025, following an order by the Commander-in-Chief of the Royal Thai Army to activate the "Chakraphong Phuwanat Plan", the Chanthaburi and Trat Border Defense Force one of Thailand’s key frontier units was placed on full alert to respond immediately to any situation by land or sea.

At 14:30 on the same day, Admiral Jirapol Wongwit, Commander-in-Chief of the Royal Thai Navy, was scheduled to personally oversee operations at the naval front.

Simultaneously, Thai authorities closed all three main border checkpoints along the eastern frontier Ban Laem, Phak Kat, and Hat Lek as well as three border trade facilitation points: Ban Subtaree, Ban Suansom, and Ban Bueng Chanang. All were reported to be completely closed

=== Martial law declared in Chanthaburi and Trat ===
On 25 July 2025, the Royal Thai Navy announced the imposition of martial law in eight districts across Chanthaburi and Trat provinces, citing rising tensions along the Thai–Cambodian border.

=== Border clashes and Operation Trat Pikhat Pairee 1 ===
On 26 July 2025, at approximately 05:10 AM, Thai news outlets reported renewed clashes along the Thai-Cambodian border in Trat Province. Cambodian forces reportedly launched an attack in a new area near Ban Chamrak. In response, the Chanthaburi and Trat Border Defense Force engaged and returned fire.

Shortly after, the Royal Thai Navy launched "Operation Trat Pikhat Pairee 1", aimed at pushing back Cambodian troops allegedly encroaching on Thai territory in three locations. By 05:40 AM, the Royal Thai Navy had reportedly succeeded in repelling the Cambodian forces, forcing them to retreat beyond the border.

== Decorations ==
- Member of the Most Noble Order of the Crown of Thailand (M.V.M.), 2023
- Knight Grand Cross of the Most Exalted Order of the White Elephant (P.C.), 2020
- Chakra Mala Medal, 1998

Preceded by Adung Phan-iam	Commander-in-Chief of the Royal Thai Navy; October 1, 2024 – September 30, 2025	Succeeded by Pairote Fuengchan
