= 2013 Bangkok gubernatorial election =

- 3 March 2013
- Turnout: 63.98%
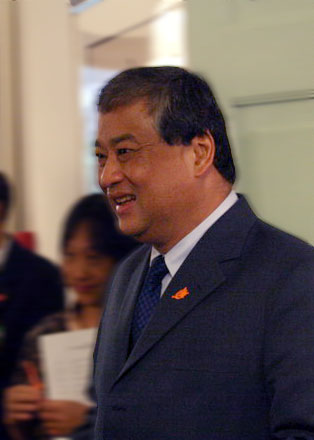

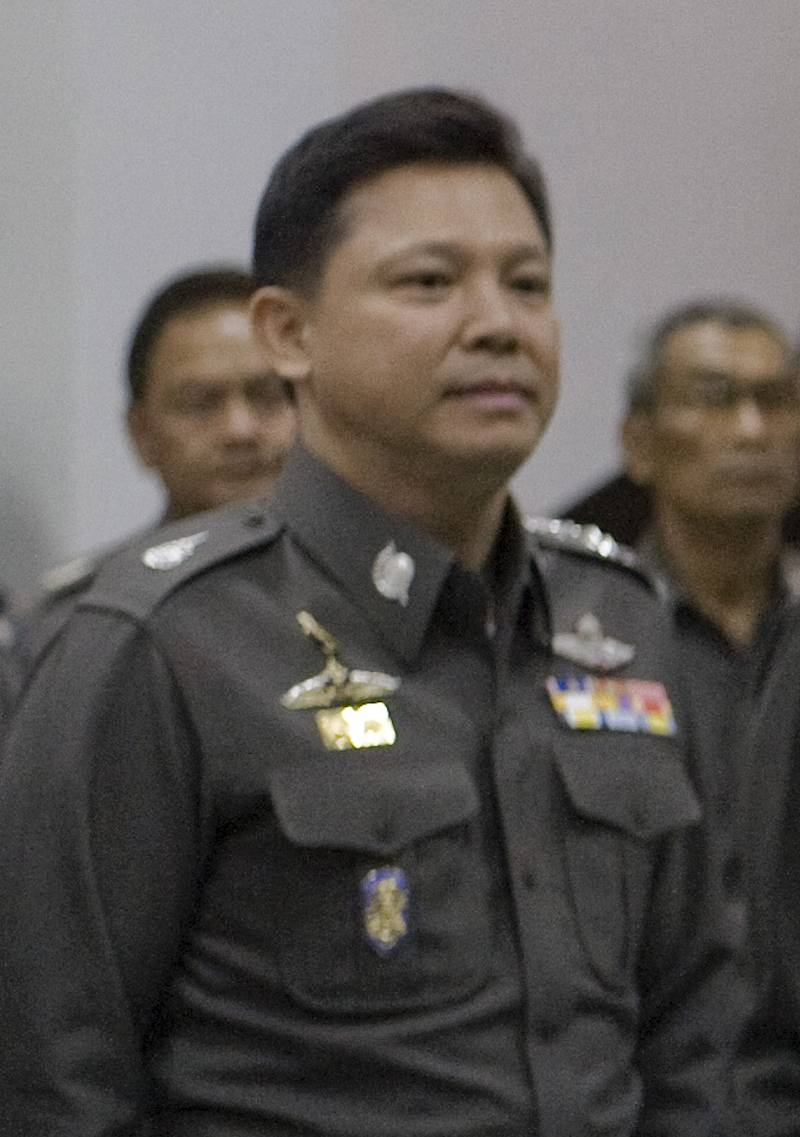
Candidate	Sukhumbhand Paribatra	Pongsapat Pongcharoen	Sereepisuth Temeeyaves
Party	Democrat	Pheu Thai	Independent
Popular vote	1,256,349	1,077,899	166,582
Percentage	47.75%	40.97%	6.33%
- Gubernatorial election results map. Blue denotes districts won by Paribatra, Red denotes those won by Pongcharoen.
Governor before election
Sukhumbhand Paribatra
Democrat
Elected Governor
Sukhumbhand Paribatra
Democrat

The 2013 Bangkok gubernatorial election took place on 3 March 2013, this was the tenth election for the governorship of Bangkok. The incumbent Democrat governor, M.R. Sukhumbhand Paribatra, won the election and secured his second consecutive term in office.

A total of 25 candidates contested in this election, including Police General Pongsapat Pongcharoen who was the candidate for Pheu Thai Party. He was regarded as the other major contender for the governorship.

== Campaign ==
The election was scheduled to take place sixty days after Sukhumbhand resigned on 9 January 2013, his second-to-last day of office. (Resignation, as opposed to completion of the term, effectively extended the election deadline for another fifteen days.) The Election Commission accepted registrations on 21–25 January, although unofficial campaigning had begun earlier.

The election was viewed as a sharp contest between the Democrat Party, whose candidates had held the governorship since 2004, and the Pheu Thai Party, which lead the current national government. While Bangkok is regarded as a traditional stronghold of the Democrat Party, Sukhumbhand faced low public approval ratings. Prior to endorsing Sukhumbhand, the party faced internal controversy over the candidacy. Sukhumbhand's first-term performance was generally viewed as poor, a fact some have attributed to partisan conflicts between the city and national governments. The Pheu Thai Party picked up on this dissatisfaction and campaigned on "seamless coordination" between the governments. Its candidate, Pongsapat, previously served as spokesman of the Royal Thai Police.

== Candidates ==
The highlight of the election was also other major candidates who ran independently, including:

- Police General Seripisut Temiyavet, the former commissioner-general of the Royal Thai Police and anti-corruption activist;
- Suharit Siamwala, a DJ and business executive;
- Kosit Suvinitjit, former CEO of Media of Medias Co. and Spring News channel;
- Thoranee Rittheethamrong, an exorcist who revealed that she applied for candidacy "because of the Heaven's mandate" by which she has been directed to "liberate Bangkok from the authority of the Ministry of Interior and transfer this authority to its citizens";
- Jongjit Hirunlabh, an environmentalist;
- Captain Metta Temchamnan, a war veteran;
- Wila Udom, the representative of Chatuchak Market;
- Sopon Pornchokchai, a real estate valuer and researcher

== Results ==
Election map showing the popular vote share in each district of Bangkok

Sukhumbhand won the election with 1,256,349 votes, or 47.75% percent of votes cast. Pongsapat won 1,077,899 votes (40.97%). Voter turnout was 63.98 percent.

2013 Bangkok gubernatorial election
Party	Candidate	Votes	%	±%
Democrat	Sukhumbhand Paribatra	1,256,349	47.75	+3.34
Pheu Thai	Pongsapat Pongcharoen	1,077,899	40.97	+11.91
Independent	Sereepisuth Temeeyaves	166,582	6.33	N/A
Independent	Suharit Siamwala	78,825	3.00	N/A
Independent	Kosit Suwinijjit	28,640	1.09	N/A
Thai Rubber	Sukhum Wongprasit	2,730	0.10	N/A
Thai Sufficiency	Chamrat Inthumarn	2,594	0.10	N/A
Independent	Sumet Tanthanasirikul	2,537	0.10	−0.20
Independent	Sanhaphot Suksrimueang	2,089	0.08	N/A
Independent	Natdanai Phubetatthawich	1,341	0.05	N/A
Independent	Wila Udom	1,314	0.05	N/A
Independent	Metta Temchamchan	1,301	0.05	−0.02
Independent	Prateep Watcharachokkasem	1,250	0.05	N/A
Independent	Jongchit Hirunlap	1,194	0.05	N/A
Independent	Sophon Phonchokchai	1,128	0.04	N/A
Independent	Thaine Rittheethamrong	922	0.04	−0.06
Independent	Samit Smithinan	697	0.03	N/A
Independent	Wasin Pirom	650	0.03	N/A
Independent	Waranchai Chokchana	638	0.02	N/A
Independent	Nanthapat Kosaikanon	634	0.02	N/A
Independent	Supachai Kasemwong	464	0.02	N/A
Independent	Khajonsak Kosayothin	461	0.02	N/A
Independent	Krit Suriyaphon	273	0.01	N/A
Independent	Witthaya Jangkobphatthana	266	0.01	N/A
Independent	Rawiwan Suttawireesan	112	0.00	N/A
Majority		178,450	6.78	−8.57
Turnout		2,715,640	63.98	+12.88
Democrat hold		Swing	-4.29	

=== Results by District ===
District	Sukhumbhand	%	Pongsapat	%	Others	%	Voters	%	Eligible Voters
Bang Bon	22,934	46.03%	19,731	39.60%	7,162	14.37%	49,827	66.45%	74,983
Bang Kapi	35,581	49.96%	26,330	36.97%	9,308	13.07%	71,219	63.27%	112,555
Bang Khae	44,419	46.35%	37,430	39.06%	13,979	14.59%	95,828	65.76%	145,715
Bang Khen	37,591	40.06%	43,024	45.84%	13,232	14.10%	93,847	64.89%	144,634
Bang Kho Laem	25,107	56.79%	12,977	29.35%	6,127	13.86%	44,211	63.10%	70,060
Bang Khun Thian	33,989	44.10%	32,378	42.01%	10,700	13.88%	77,067	64.89%	118,760
Bang Na	21,764	48.63%	16,651	37.21%	6,335	14.16%	44,750	62.32%	71,803
Bang Phlat	22,877	44.95%	20,244	39.78%	7,775	15.28%	50,896	64.03%	79,484
Bang Rak	13,632	62.70%	4,824	22.19%	3,284	15.11%	21,740	66.17%	32,856
Bang Sue	26,781	42.71%	27,070	43.17%	8,856	14.12%	62,707	61.53%	101,911
Bangkok Noi	26,695	47.57%	20,510	36.55%	8,909	15.88%	56,114	61.42%	91,367
Bangkok Yai	17,393	47.70%	13,046	35.78%	6,024	16.52%	36,463	64.76%	56,309
Bueng Kum	33,679	45.76%	29,737	40.41%	10,179	13.83%	73,595	66.10%	111,346
Chatuchak	38,766	47.74%	31,227	38.46%	11,203	13.80%	81,196	65.00%	124,914
Chom Thong	33,968	45.70%	29,458	39.63%	10,903	14.67%	74,329	62.16%	119,582
Din Daeng	29,484	46.46%	25,297	39.86%	8,686	13.69%	63,467	63.83%	99,437
Don Mueang	28,092	35.46%	40,073	50.58%	11,062	13.96%	79,227	63.53%	124,703
Dusit	17,386	37.64%	21,818	47.23%	6,990	15.13%	46,194	56.85%	81,260
Huai Khwang	18,616	48.15%	14,906	38.55%	5,140	13.29%	38,662	64.66%	59,789
Khan Na Yao	18,042	42.09%	19,137	44.64%	5,688	13.27%	42,867	66.75%	64,224
Khlong Sam Wa	35,051	43.40%	35,758	44.28%	9,946	12.32%	80,755	66.31%	121,775
Khlong San	21,089	55.62%	11,088	29.25%	5,736	15.13%	37,913	65.32%	58,043
Khlong Toei	22,060	49.08%	16,516	36.75%	6,367	14.17%	44,943	58.14%	77,301
Lak Si	23,981	42.70%	24,518	43.65%	7,668	13.65%	56,167	66.05%	85,035
Lat Krabang	25,450	34.14%	39,007	52.32%	10,095	13.54%	74,552	63.22%	117,929
Lat Phrao	29,690	47.18%	24,717	39.28%	8,524	13.54%	62,931	66.69%	94,370
Min Buri	28,744	44.75%	27,327	42.54%	8,163	12.71%	64,234	65.19%	98,526
Nong Chok	29,912	42.14%	32,168	45.32%	8,898	12.54%	70,978	64.24%	110,486
Nong Khaem	29,232	40.34%	33,129	45.71%	10,109	13.95%	72,470	65.14%	111,251
Pathum Wan	13,242	55.26%	7,265	30.32%	3,455	14.42%	23,962	61.29%	39,093
Phasi Charoen	28,009	43.08%	27,327	42.04%	9,673	14.88%	65,009	65.60%	99,097
Phaya Thai	17,254	47.41%	13,559	37.25%	5,584	15.34%	36,397	66.88%	54,421
Phra Khanong	23,346	50.86%	16,173	35.24%	6,379	13.90%	45,898	63.05%	72,794
Phra Nakhon	15,074	53.69%	8,854	31.54%	4,147	14.77%	28,075	64.61%	43,452
Pom Prap Sattru Phai	14,837	60.92%	5,890	24.19%	3,626	14.89%	24,353	62.46%	38,989
Prawet	34,919	47.93%	28,514	39.14%	9,418	12.93%	72,851	62.44%	116,666
Rat Burana	17,625	43.07%	17,305	42.28%	5,995	14.65%	40,925	63.04%	64,915
Ratchathewi	14,841	48.34%	11,216	36.53%	4,647	15.13%	30,704	59.51%	51,592
Sai Mai	30,424	34.62%	45,767	52.08%	11,685	13.30%	87,876	63.27%	138,880
Samphanthawong	9,346	65.11%	2,752	19.17%	2,257	15.72%	14,355	66.62%	21,549
Saphan Sung	23,928	52.92%	15,599	34.50%	5,688	12.58%	45,215	67.23%	67,254
Sathon	24,600	60.08%	10,488	25.61%	5,858	14.31%	40,946	63.04%	64,952
Suan Luang	29,803	54.21%	17,758	32.30%	7,417	13.49%	54,978	63.79%	86,192
Taling Chan	23,504	42.98%	22,704	41.52%	8,475	15.50%	54,683	65.51%	83,474
Thawi Watthana	20,559	49.53%	15,009	36.16%	5,942	14.31%	41,510	70.88%	58,566
Thon Buri	28,279	49.23%	20,235	35.22%	8,934	15.55%	57,448	61.74%	93,054
Thung Khru	27,081	47.87%	21,416	37.86%	8,075	14.27%	56,572	65.22%	86,744
Watthana	19,877	61.70%	8,179	25.39%	4,162	12.92%	32,218	58.82%	54,775
Wang Thonglang	26,437	48.52%	20,645	37.89%	7,403	13.59%	54,485	63.14%	86,298
Yan Nawa	21,359	56.16%	11,148	29.31%	5,524	14.52%	38,031	62.04%	61,300
Total	1,256,349	47.75%	1,077,899	40.97%	296,642	11.28%	2,715,640	63.98%	4,244,465
