= Order of the White Elephant =

Thai award

The Most Exalted Order of the White Elephant เครื่องราชอิสริยาภรณ์อันเป็นที่เชิดชูยิ่งช้างเผือก
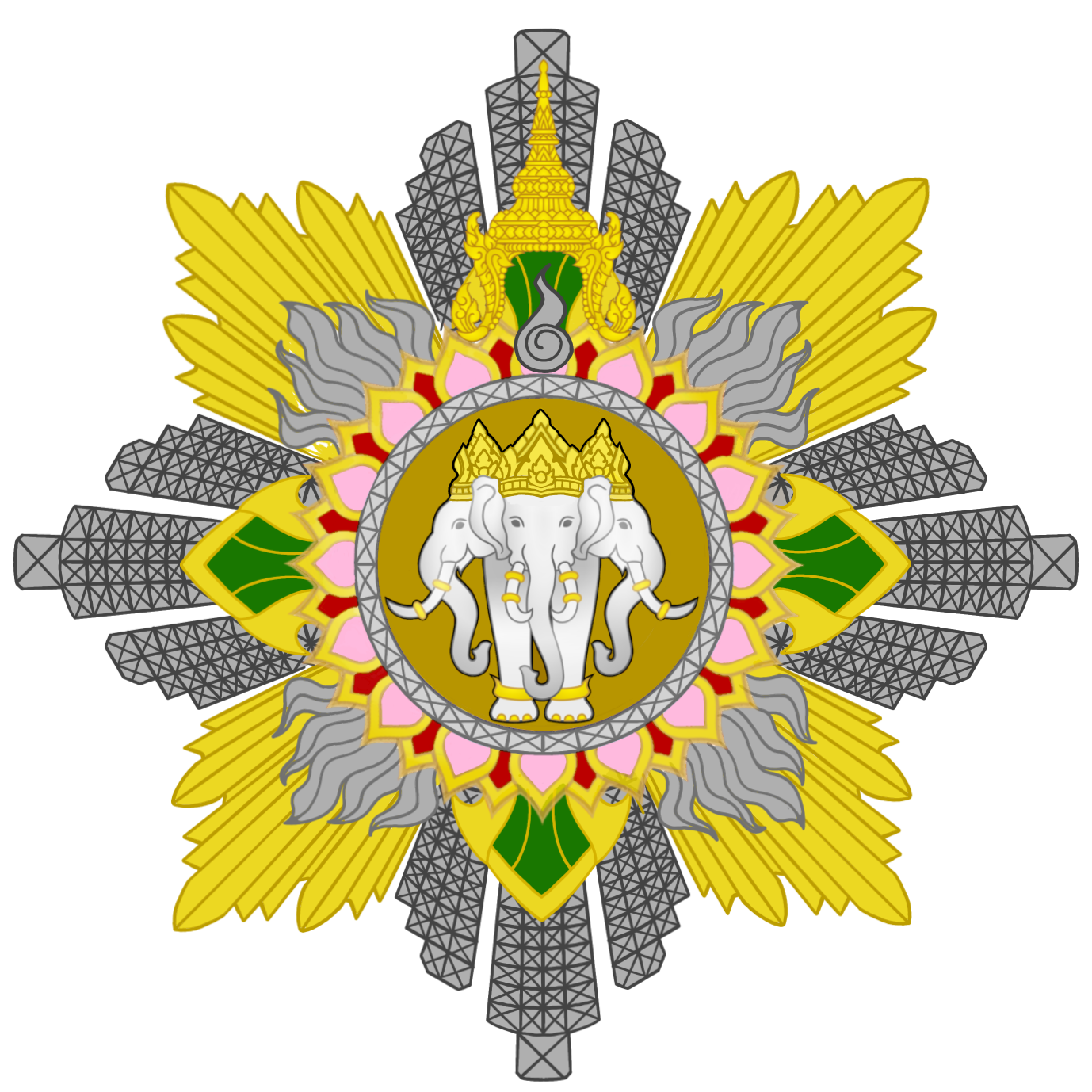
- Knight Grand Cordon (Special Class) of the Most Exalted Order of the White Elephant

Awarded by the King of Thailand
- Type: Military and Civilian Order
- Established: 1861
- Eligibility: Royal officials
- Awarded for: Meritorious service to the government or the public
- Status: Currently constituted
- Founder: King Mongkut
- Sovereign: King Vajiralongkorn
- Grades: Knight Grand Cordon; Knight Grand Cross; Knight Commander; Commander; Companion; Member; Gold Medal; Silver Medal
- Former grades: 4 until 1902, 6 until 1909

Statistics
- First induction: 1861
- Last induction: 23 March 2023

Precedence
- Next (higher): Order of Rama
- Next (lower): Order of the Crown of Thailand
- Ribbon bar of the Order of the Knight Grand Cordon

The Most Exalted Order of the White Elephant (Thai: เครื่องราชอิสริยาภรณ์อันเป็นที่เชิดชูยิ่งช้างเผือก; RTGS: Khrueang Ratcha-itsariyaphon An Pen Thi Choetchu Ying Chang Phueak) is an order of Thailand. It was established in 1861 by King Rama IV of the Kingdom of Siam. The King of Thailand confers the order for meritorious service to the government or the public. Nomination criteria vary by role and award class. The order features the three-headed Airavata, the mount of Sakra, or a white elephant.

== Classes ==
The order consists of eight classes:

Ribbon	Star	Class	Name	Postnominals	Old name	Date	Order of precedence
		Knight Grand Cordon (Special Class)	มหาปรมาภรณ์ช้างเผือก (Maha Paramabhorn Chang Phueak)	-	MPCh (GCE)	16 November 1909	8
		Knight Grand Cross (First Class)	ประถมาภรณ์ช้างเผือก (Prathamabhorn Chang Phueak)	มหาวราภรณ์ Maha Varabhorn	PCh (KCE)	1869	10
		Knight Commander (Second Class)	ทวีติยาภรณ์ช้างเผือก (Dvitiyabhorn Chang Phueak)	จุลวราภรณ์ Chula Varabhorn	DCh (KCE)	1869	15
		Commander (Third Class)	ตริตาภรณ์ช้างเผือก (Tritabhorn Chang Phueak)	นิภาภรณ์ Nibhabhorn	TCh (CE)	1869	23
		Companion (Fourth Class)	จัตุรถาภรณ์ช้างเผือก (Chattruthabhorn Chang Phueak)	ภูษนาภรณ์ Bhusanabhorn	ChCh (OE)	1869	28
		Member (Fifth Class)	เบญจมาภรณ์ช้างเผือก (ฺBenchamabhorn Chang Phueak)	ทิพยาภรณ์ Dibyabhorn	BCh (ME)	1873	33
		Gold Medal (Sixth Class)	เหรียญทองช้างเผือก (Rian Thong Chang Phueak)	-	RThCh (G.M.E.)	20 July 1902	52
		Silver Medal (Seventh Class)	เหรียญเงินช้างเผือก (Rian Ngoen Chang Phueak)	-	RNgCh (S.M.E.)	20 July 1902	55

== Gallery ==
=== Old designs ===
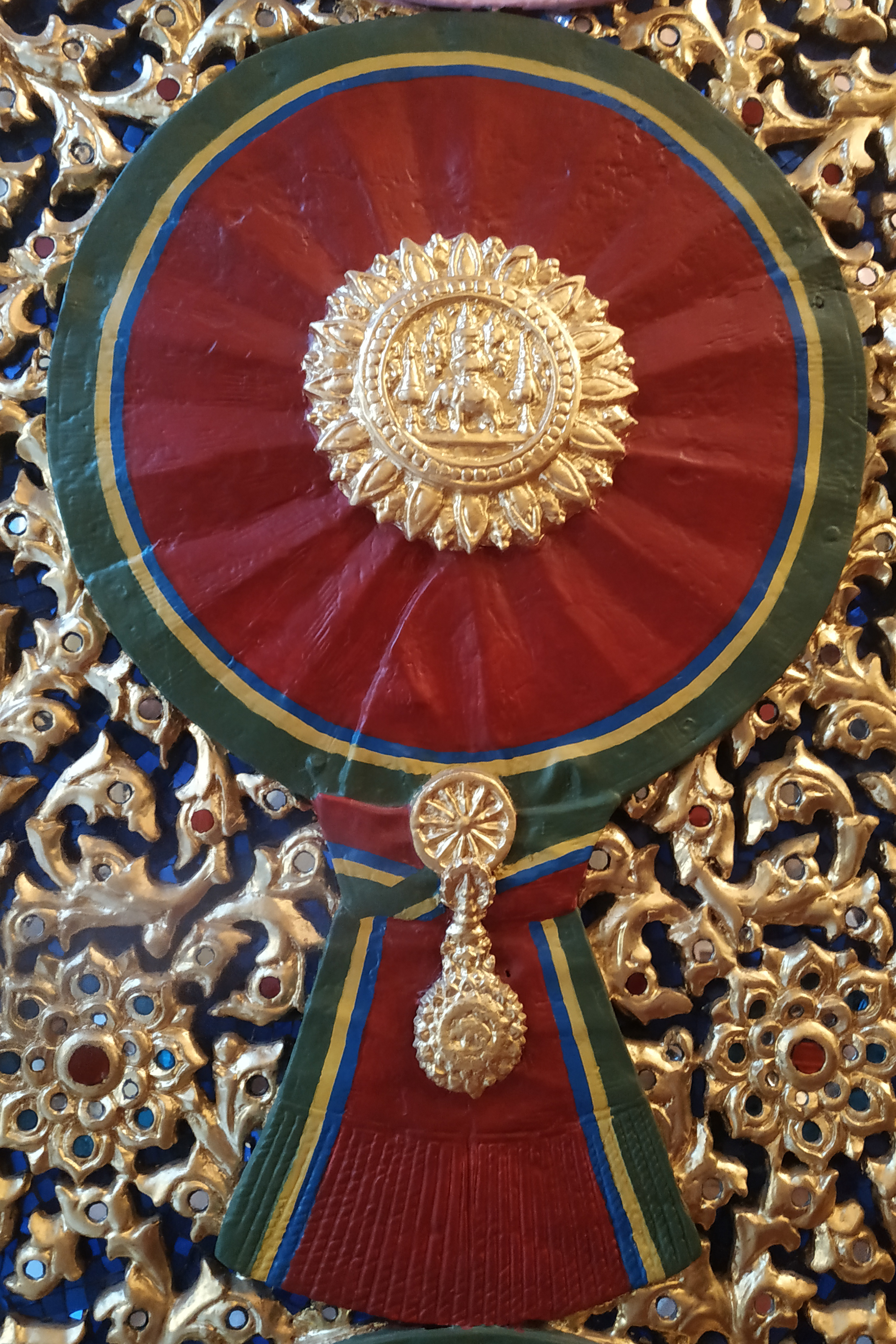
A woodcarving of "Maha Varabhorn", the Knight Grand Cross (First Class) of the Order of the White Elephant, version that was used from 1869 to 1909, at the gates of Phra Vihara of Wat Ratchabophit Sathit Maha Simaram, Bangkok.

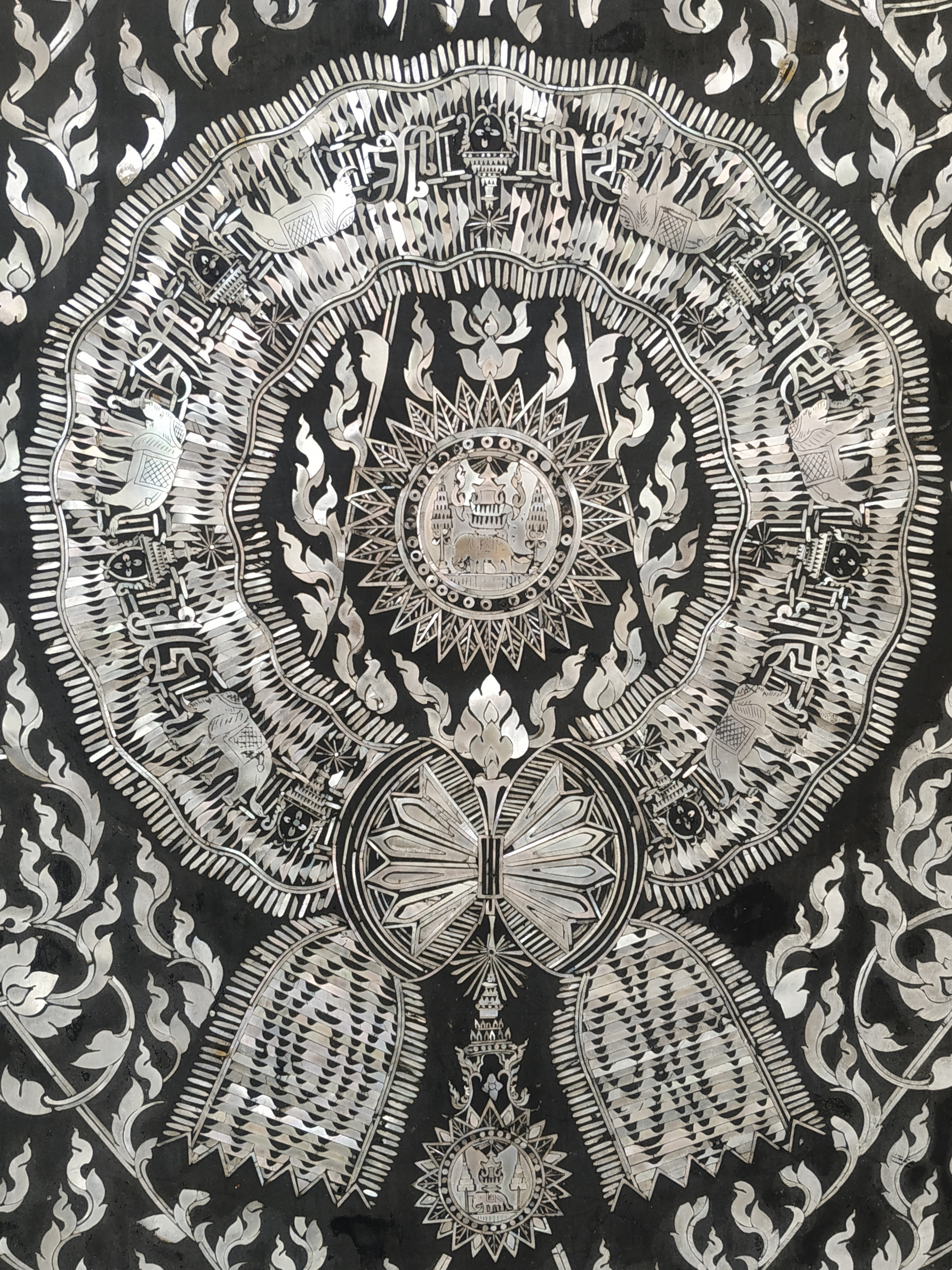
A mother-of-pearl inlay of "Maha Varabhorn", the Knight Grand Cross (1st Class) of Order of the White Elephant, version that was used from 1869 to 1909, at the gates of Phra Uposatha of Wat Ratchabophit Sathit Maha Simaram, Bangkok.

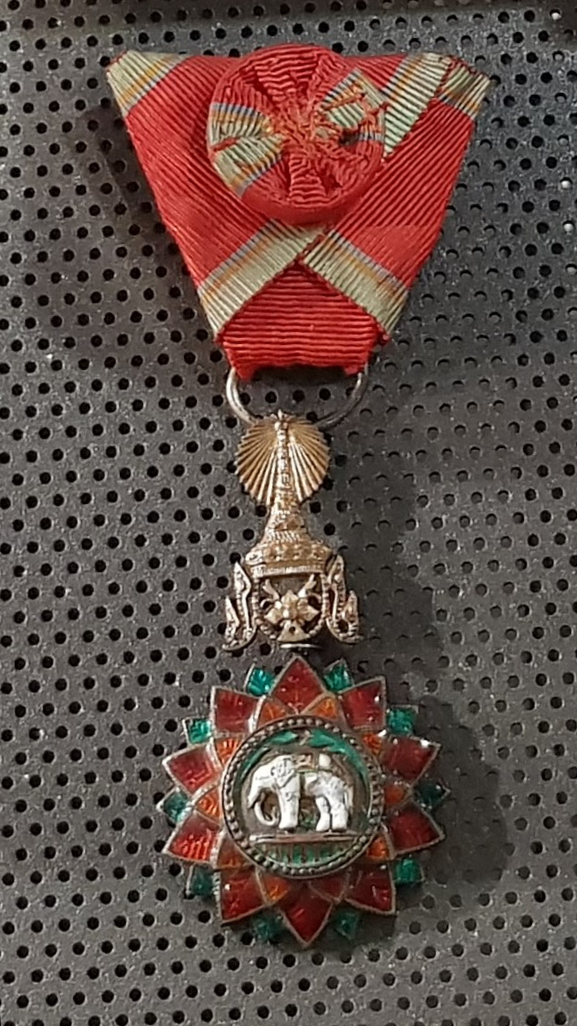
Badge of the Companion (4th Class) of Order of the White Elephant, design before 1909

=== Current designs ===
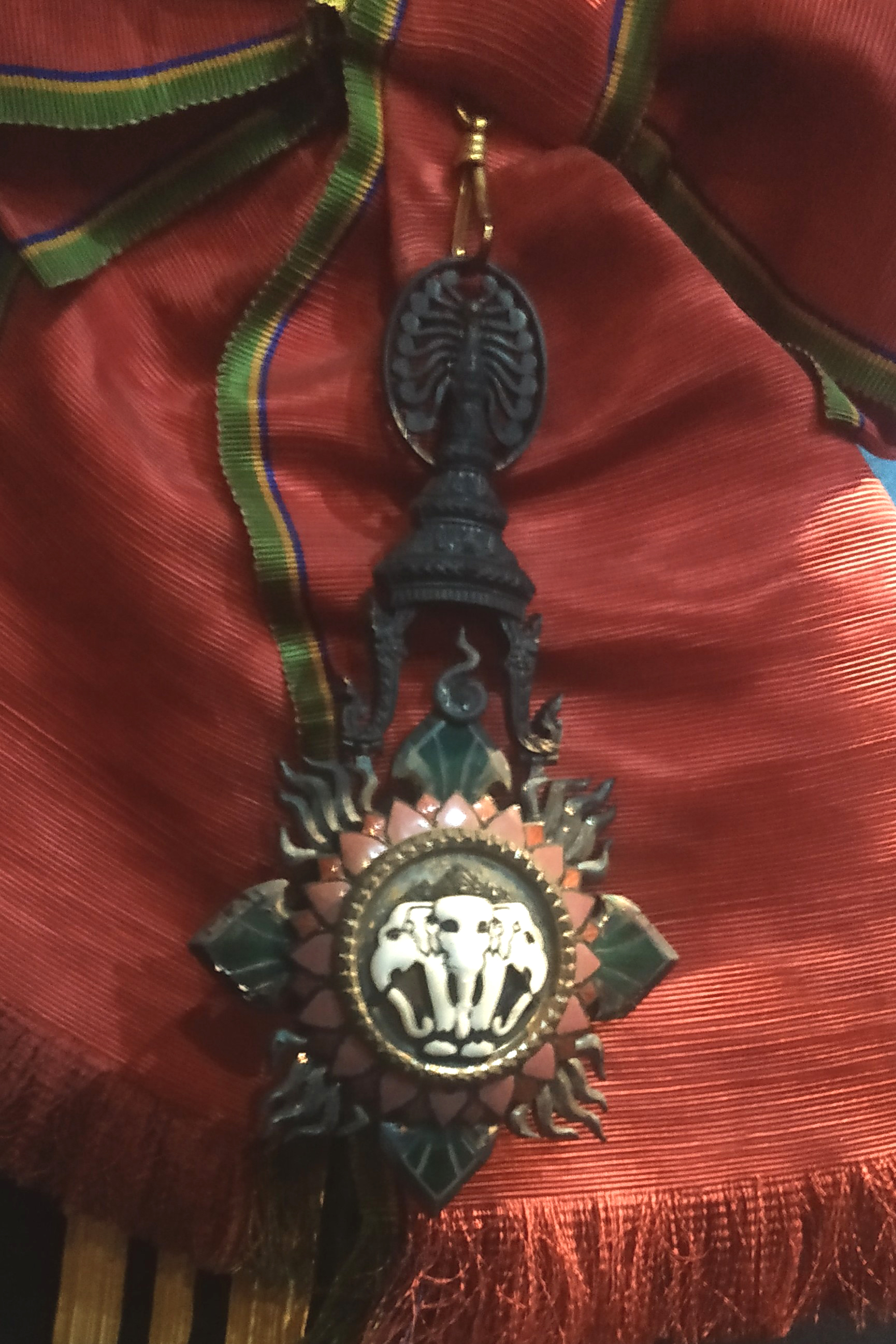
Badge of the Knight Grand Cordon (Special Class) of Order of the White Elephant

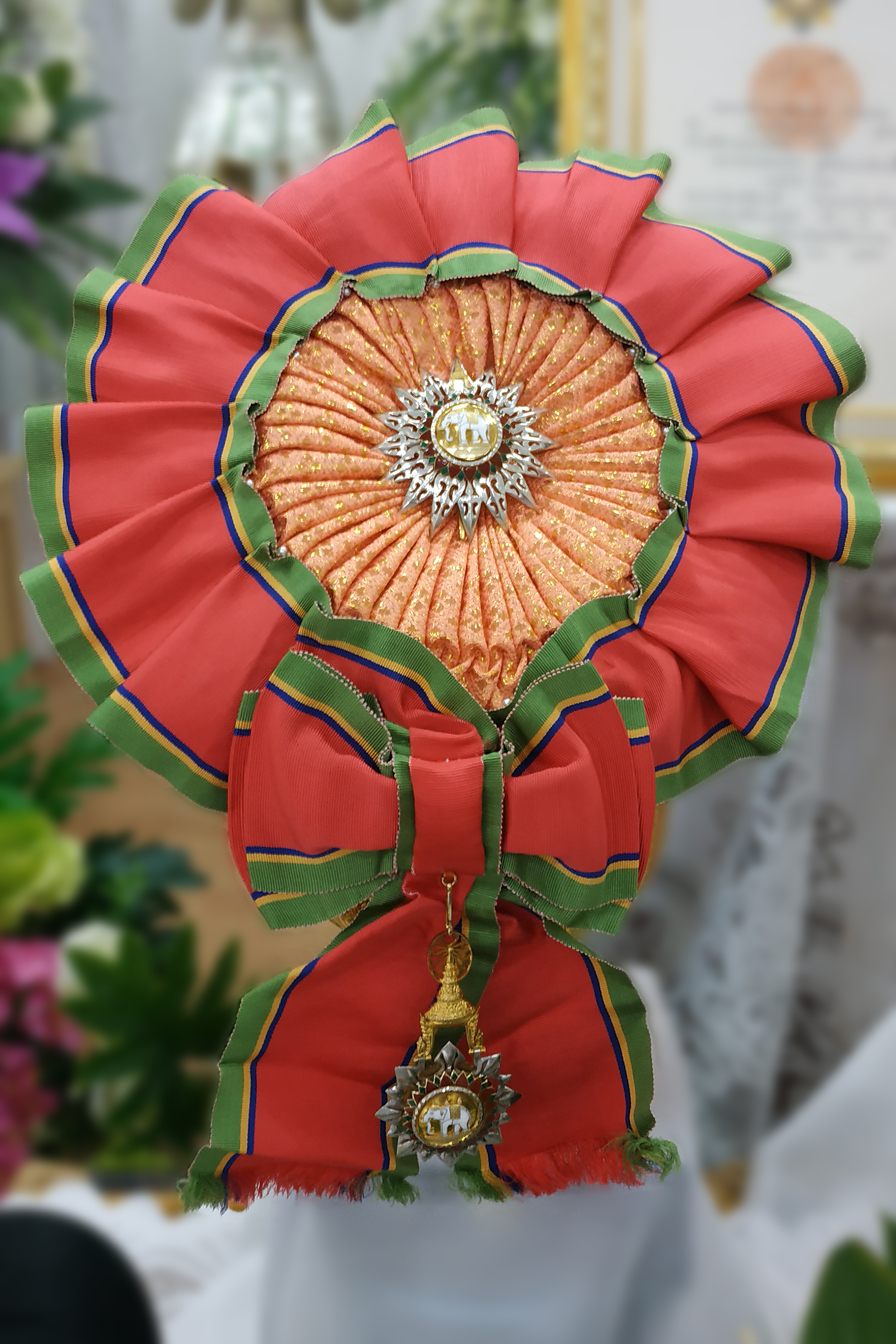
Knight Grand Cross (1st Class) of Order of the White Elephant

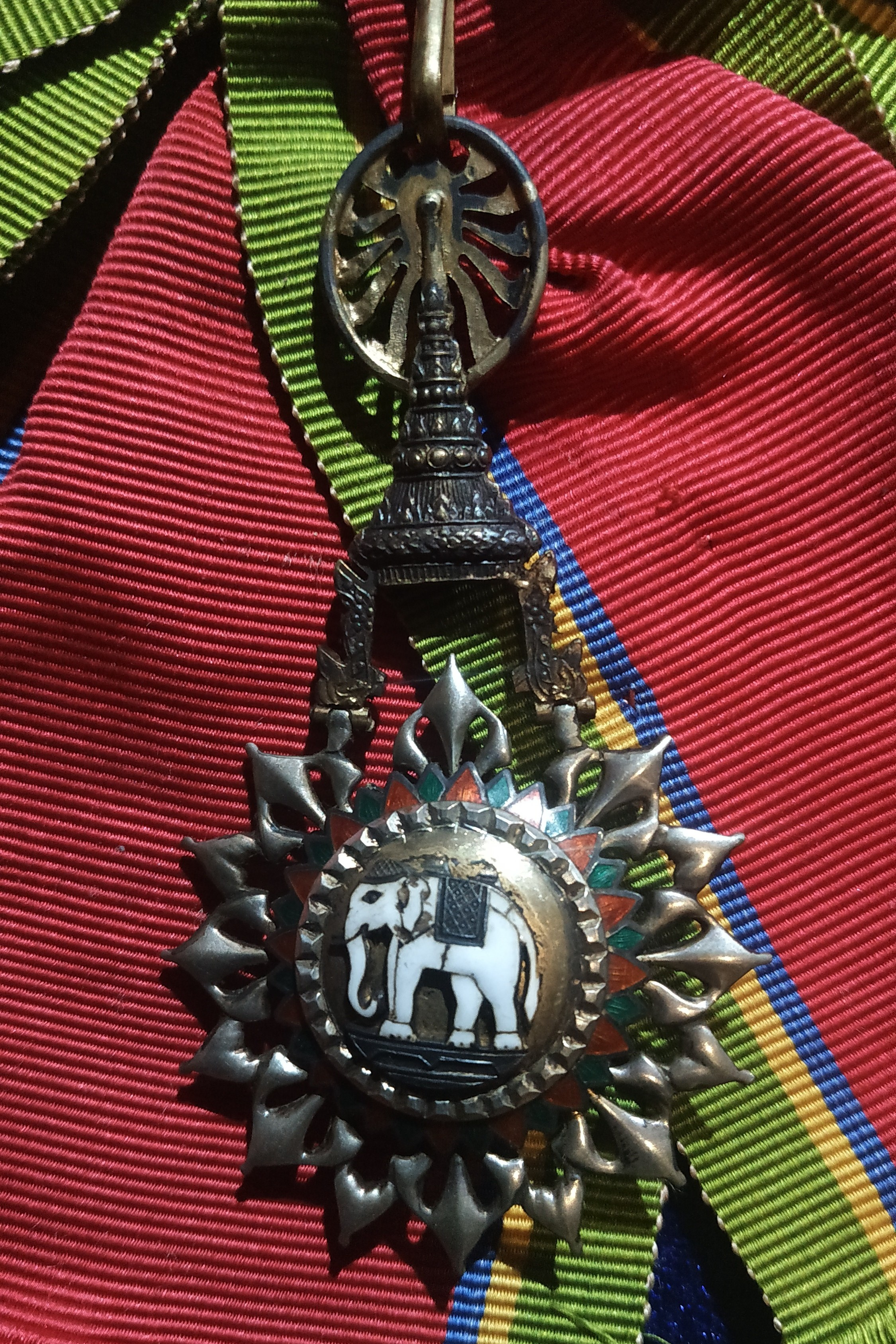
Badge of the Knight Grand Cross (1st Class) of Order of the White Elephant

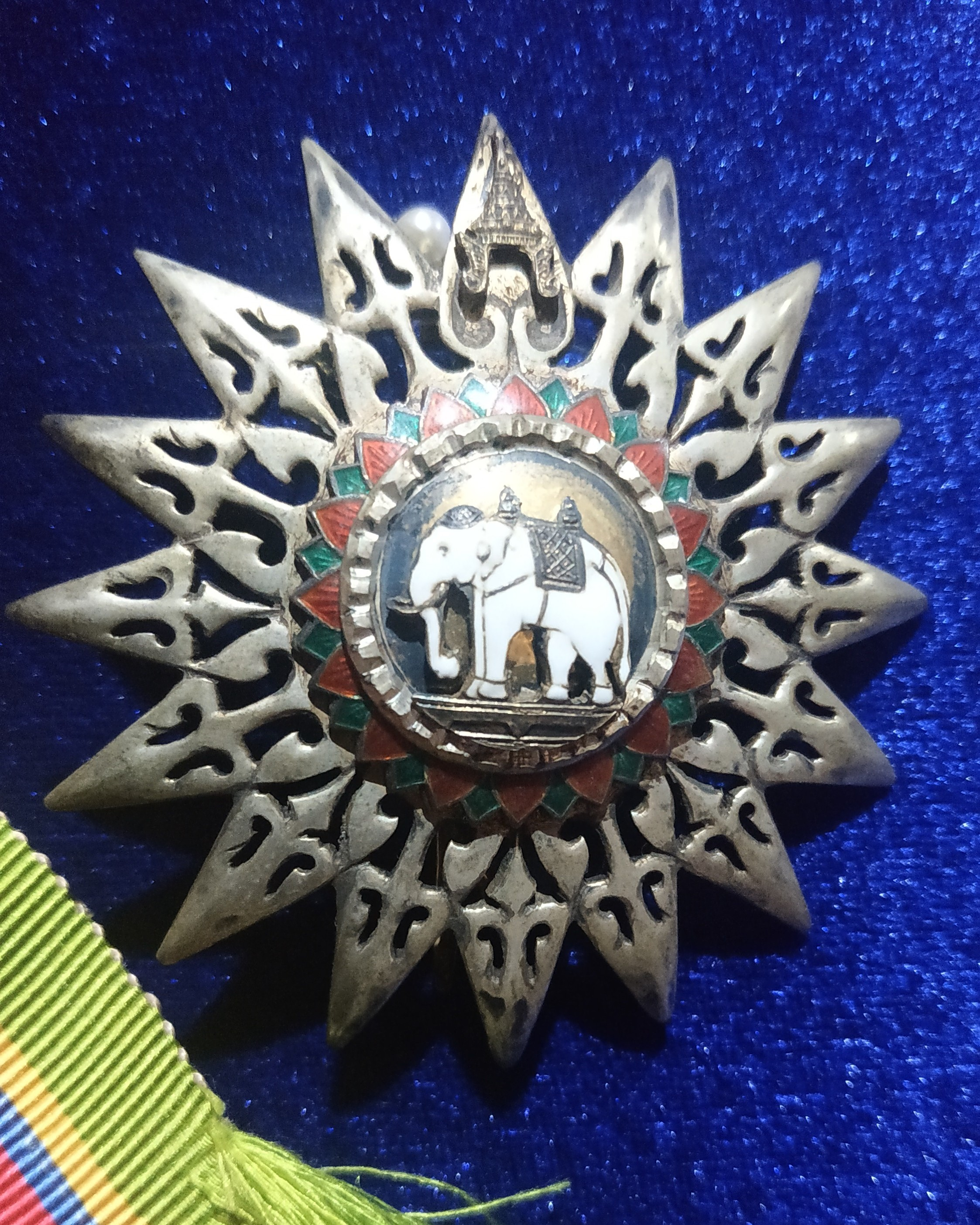
Star of the Knight Grand Cross (1st Class) and the Knight Commander (2nd Class) of Order of the White Elephant

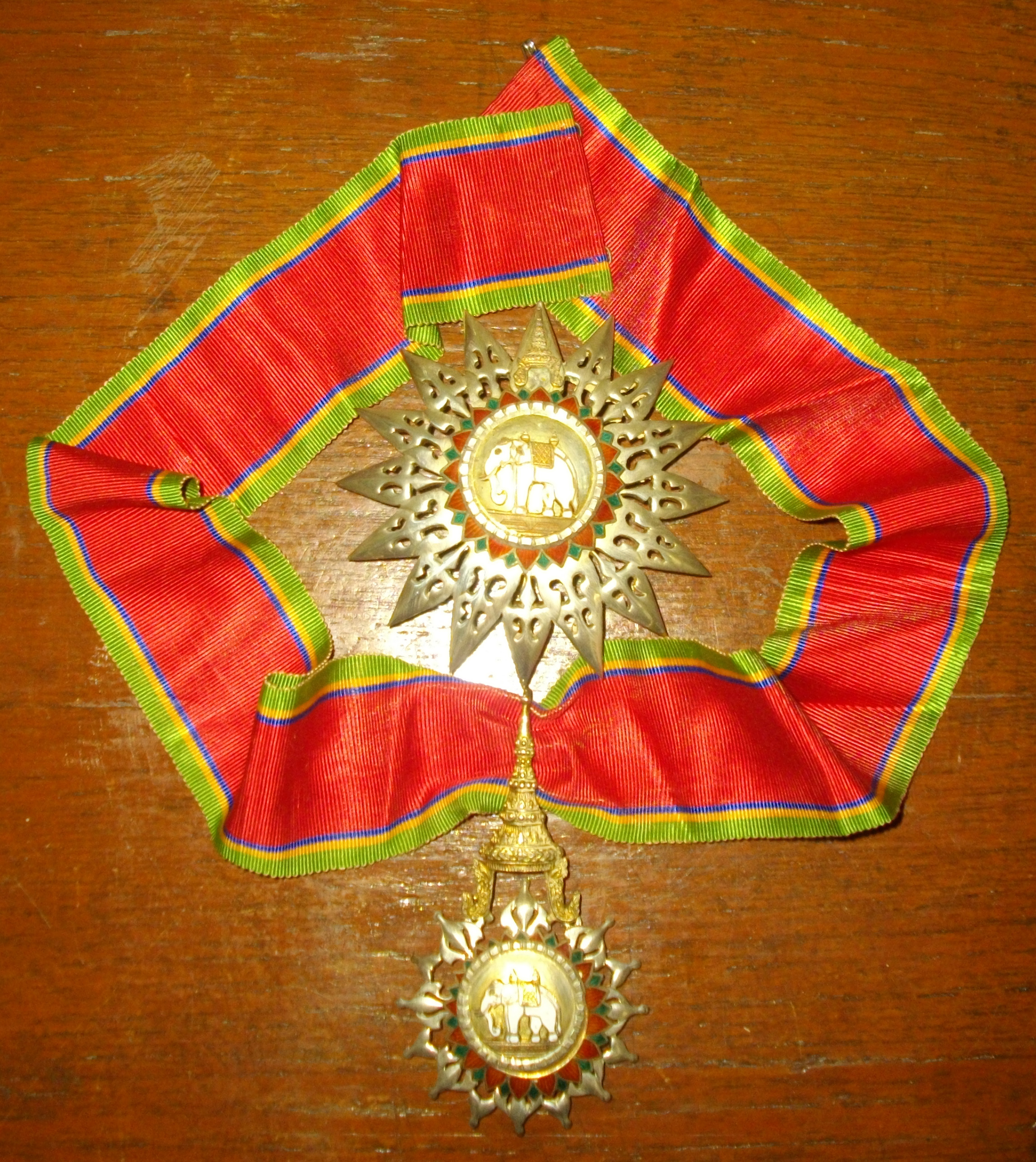
Knight Commander (2nd Class) of Order of the White Elephant

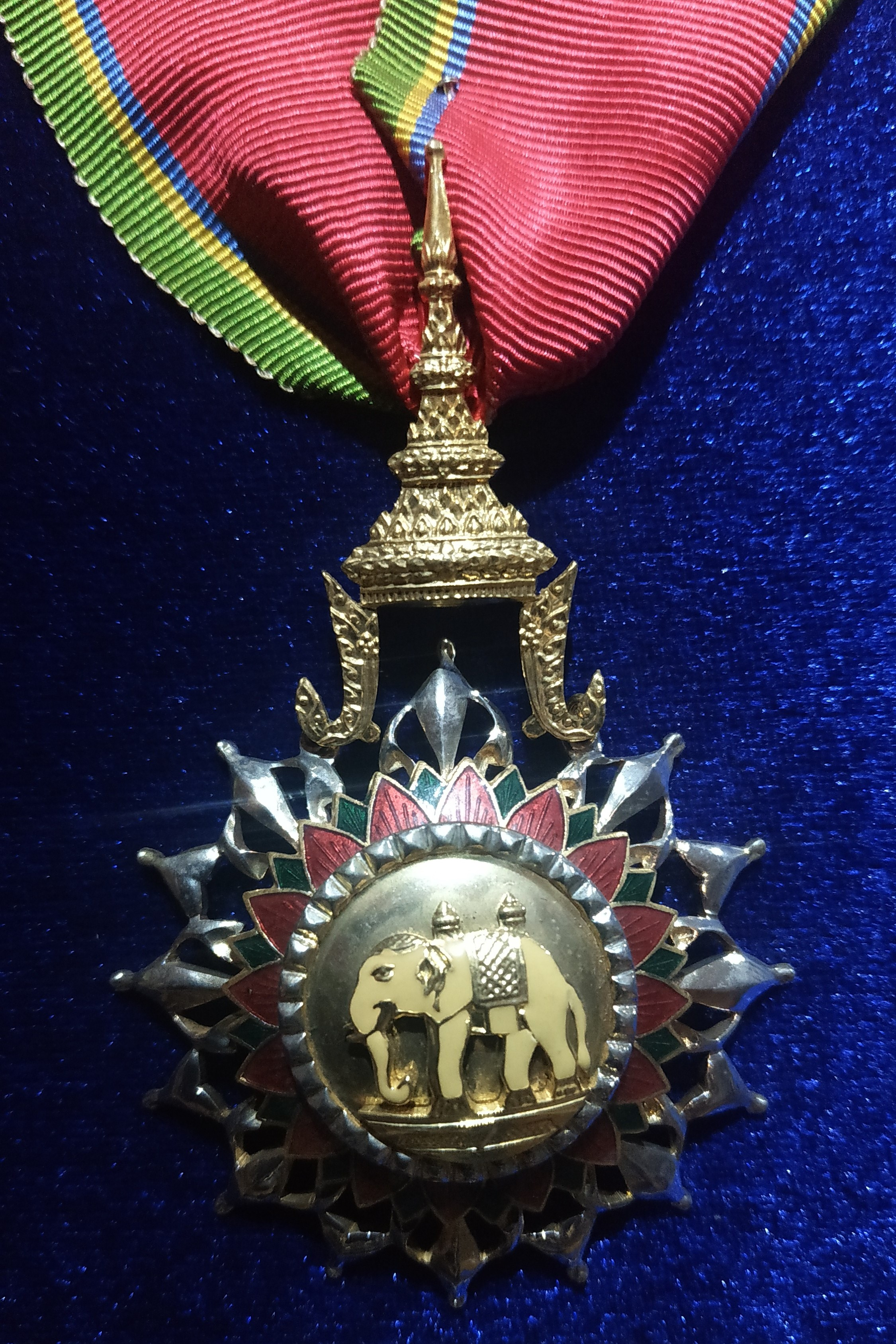
Badge of the Knight Commander (2nd Class) and the Commander (3rd Class) of Order of the White Elephant

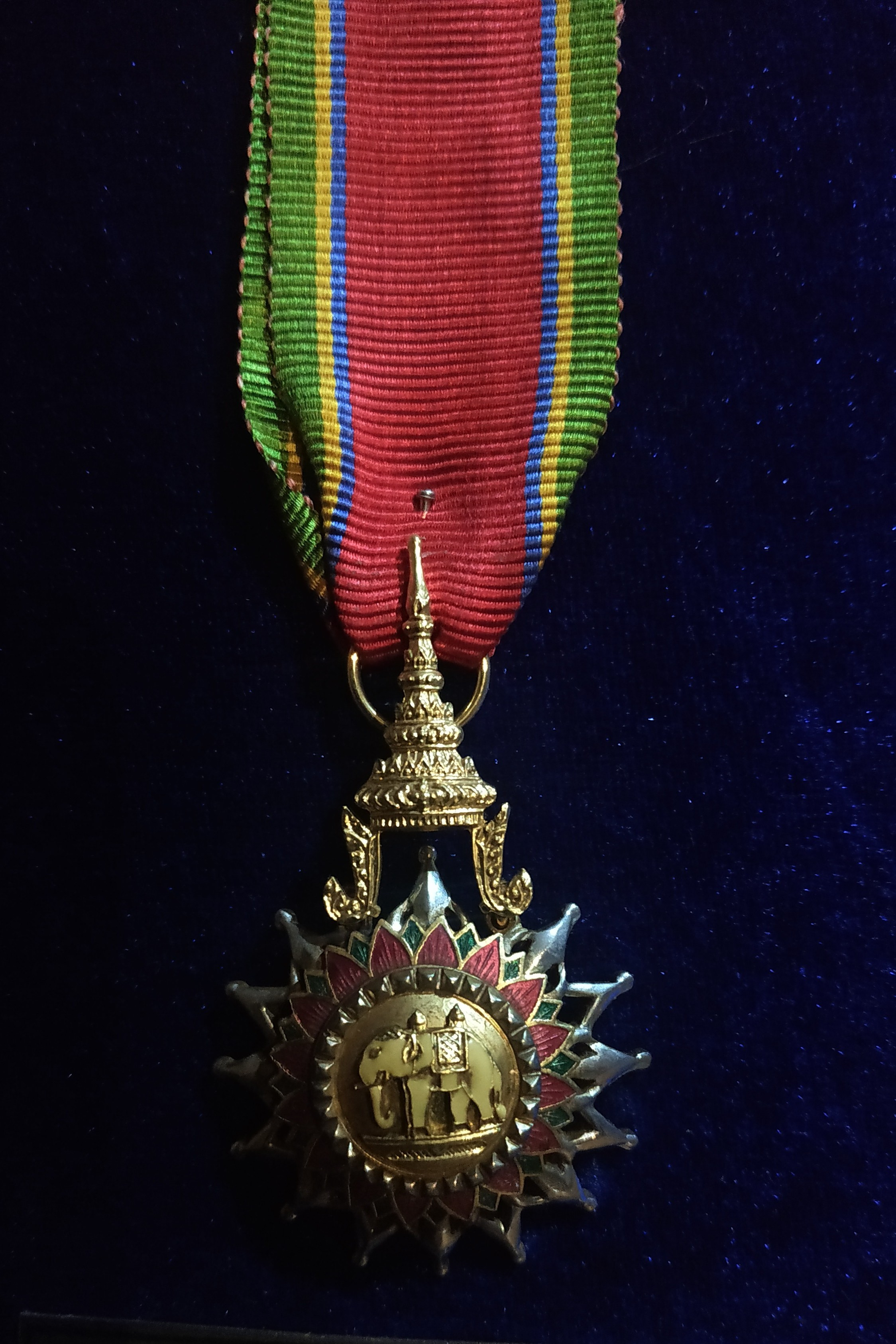
Badge of the Member (5th Class) of Order of the White Elephant

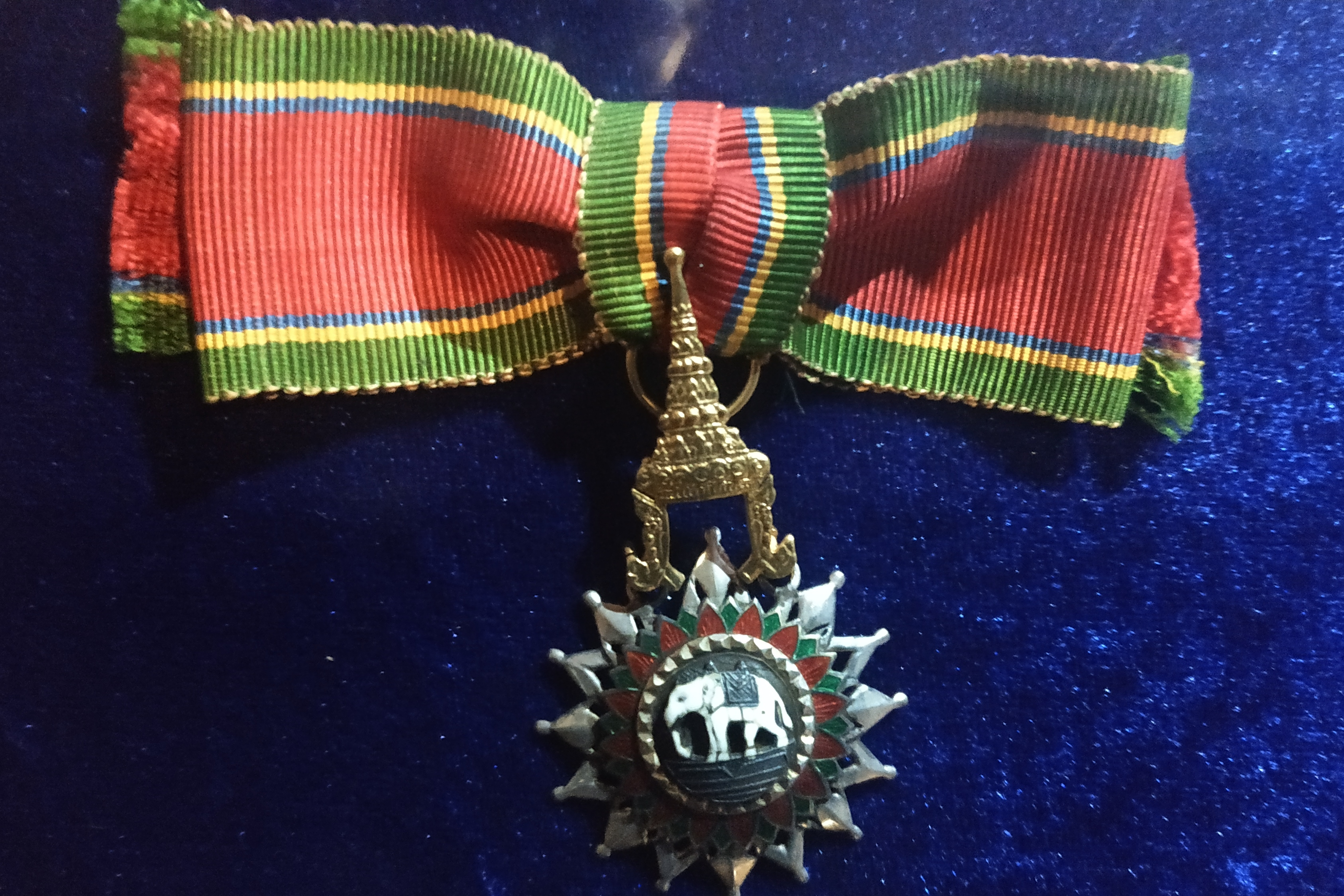
Badge of the Member (5th Class) of Order of the White Elephant, female version

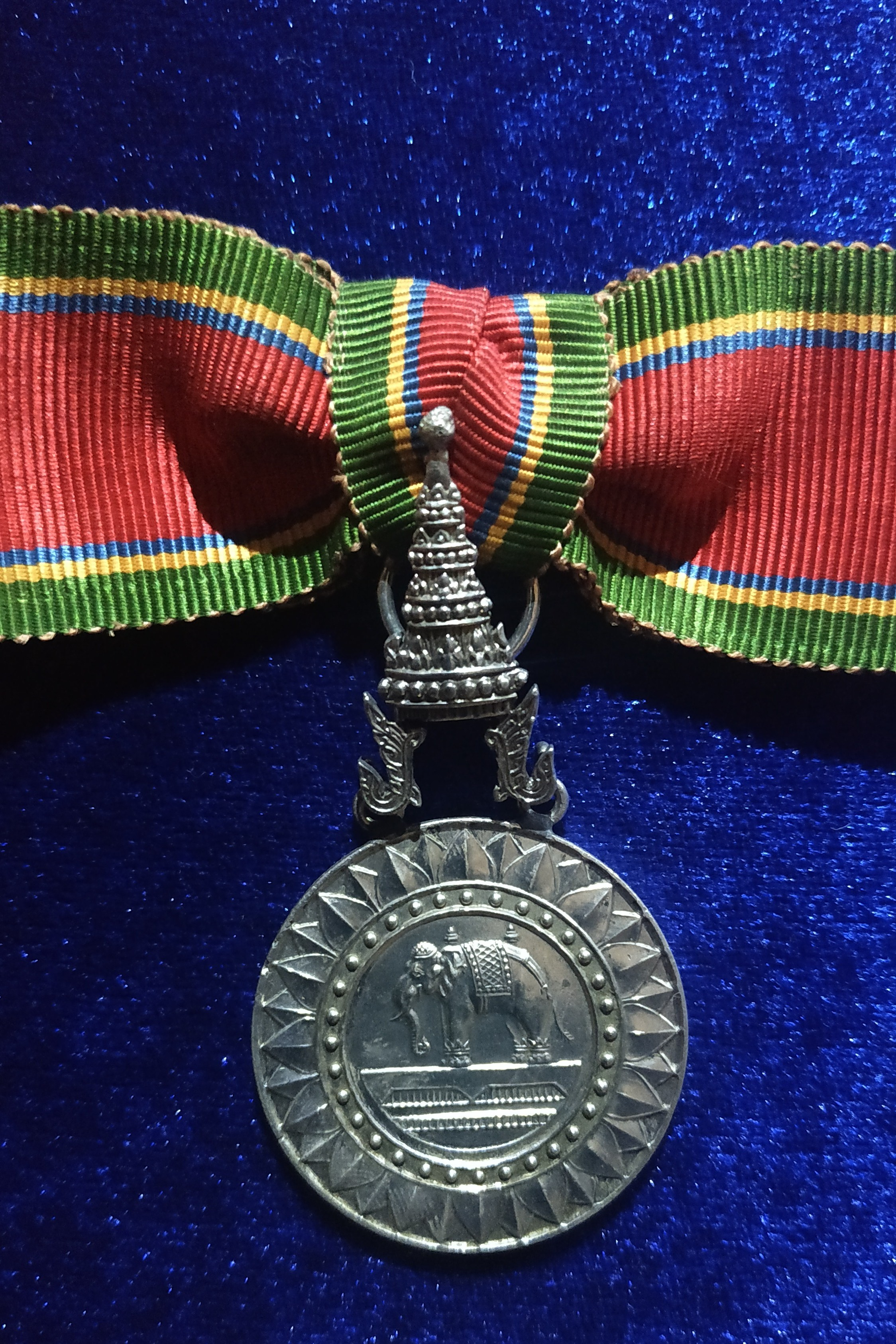
Gold Medal (6th Class) of Order of the White Elephant, female version

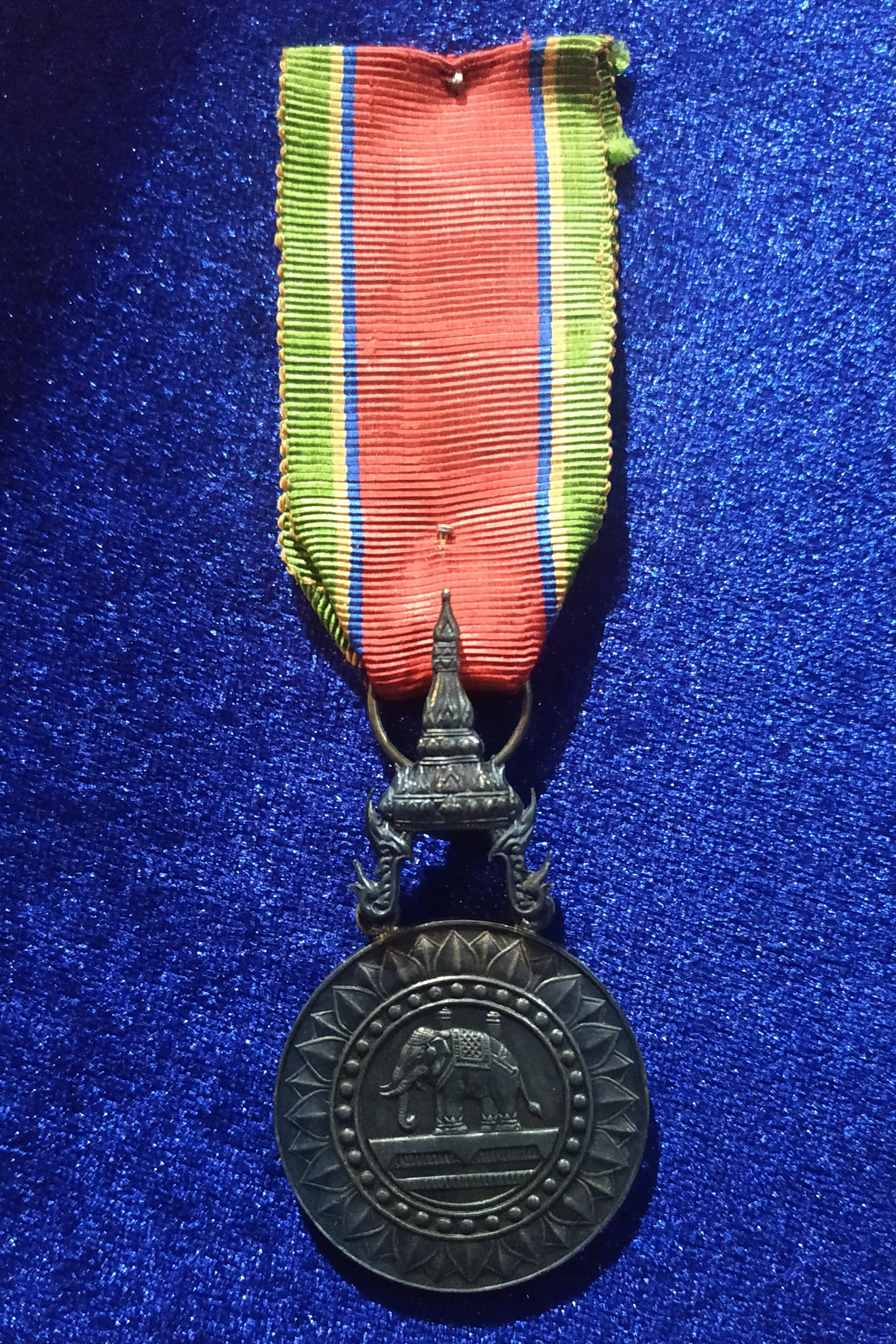
Silver Medal (7th Class) of Order of the White Elephant

== Selected recipients ==
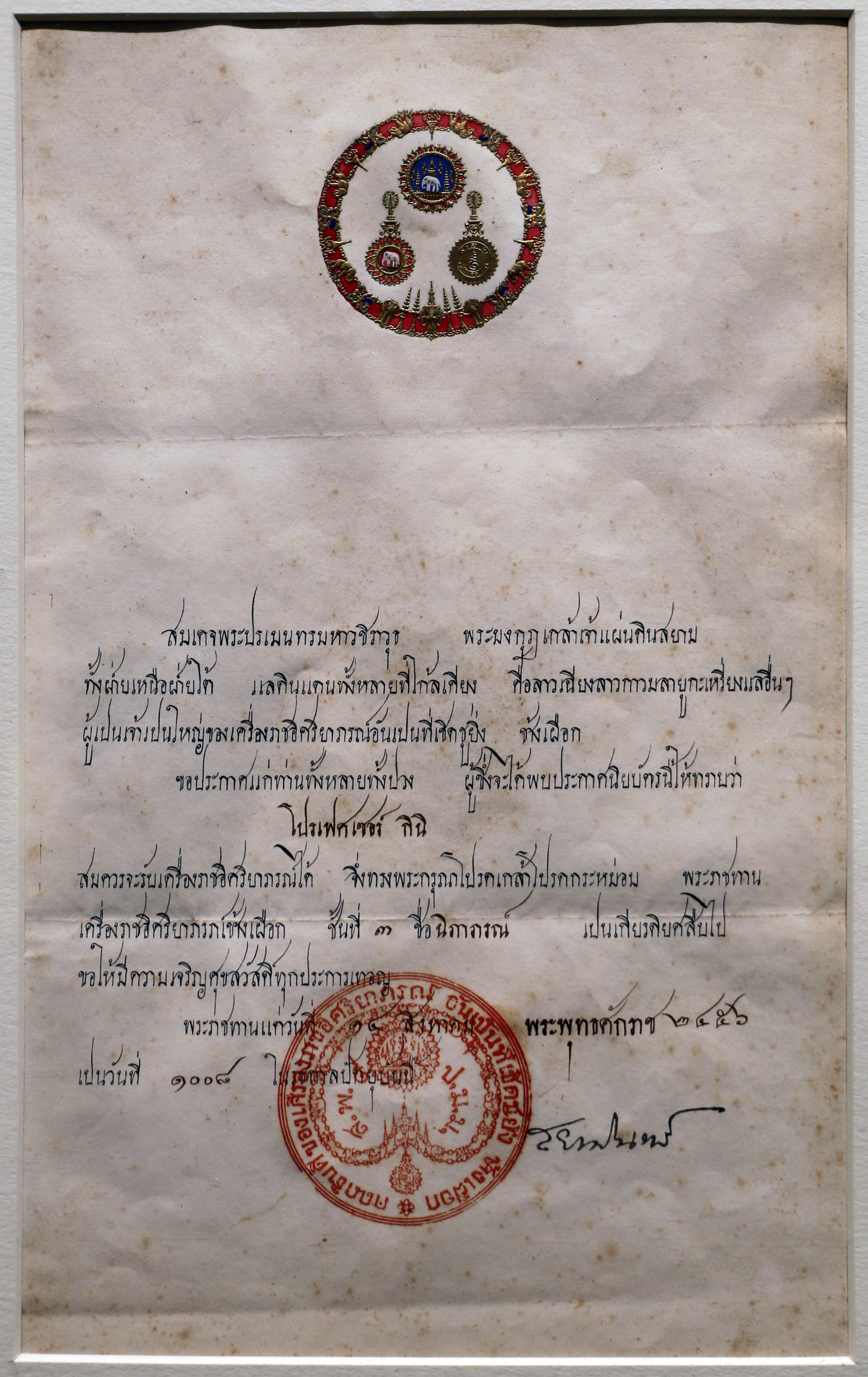
Certificate for the Commander of Order of the White Elephant, given to Professor Galileo Chini by King Vajiravudh of Siam on 14 August 1913.

- Emperor Napoleon III - Knight Grand Cross (1851, Custom Design)
- Be Biauw Tjoan, Majoor-titulair der Chinezen – Knight (1895)
- Friedrich von Beck-Rzikowsky - Knight Grand Cross
- Plaek Phibunsongkhram - Knight Grand Cordon
- Sultan Ibrahim of Johor - Knight Grand Cordon
- Sultan Abdul Hamid Halim Shah of Kedah - Knight Grand Cordon
- Chavalit Yongchaiyudh - Knight Grand Cordon
- Sarit Thanarat - Knight Grand Cordon
- Thanom Kittikachorn - Knight Grand Cordon
- Praphas Charusathien - Knight Grand Cordon
- Phin Choonhavan - Knight Grand Cordon
- Prem Tinsulanonda - Knight Grand Cordon
- Chatichai Choonhavan - Knight Grand Cordon
- Prayut Chan-o-cha - Knight Grand Cordon
- Surayud Chulanont - Knight Grand Cordon
- Arthit Kamlang-ek - Knight Grand Cordon
- Fuen Ronnaphagrad Ritthakhanee - Knight Grand Cordon
- Phao Siyanon - Knight Grand Cordon
- Chakthip Chaijinda - Knight Grand Cordon
- Somyot Poompanmoung - Knight Grand Cordon
- Thanasak Patimaprakorn - Knight Grand Cordon
- Pongsapat Pongcharoen - Knight Grand Cordon
- Apirat Kongsompong - Knight Grand Cross
- Pornpipat Benyasri - Knight Grand Cordon
- Chatchai Sriworakan - Knight Grand Cordon
- Chalermpol Srisawat - Knight Grand Cross
- Udomdej Sitabutr - Knight Grand Cordon
- Luechai Rutdit - Knight Grand Cordon
- Naris Pratumsuwan - Knight Grand Cordon
- Airbull Suttiwan - Knight Grand Cross
- Manat Wongwat - Knight Grand Cross
- Prince Paribatra Sukhumbandhu - Knight Grand Cordon
- Prince Bhanurangsi Savangwongse - Knight Grand Cordon
- Prince Narisara Nuwattiwong - Knight Grand Cordon
- Prince Damrong Rajanubhab - Knight Grand Cordon
- Prince Chula Chakrabongse - Knight Grand Cordon
- Prince Chakrabongse Bhuvanath - Knight Grand Cordon
- Prince Suphayok Kasem - Knight Grand Cordon (Special Class)
- Na Arreenich - Knight Grand Cordon
- Alexander I of Yugoslavia - Knight Grand Cordon
- Bob Hawke - Knight Grand Cordon
- Albert du Roy de Blicquy
- Norodom of Cambodia - Knight Grand Cross
- John T. Cole - Knight Commander
- Pakubuwono X - Knight Grand Cross (1929)
- Try Sutrisno - Knight Grand Cross (1991)
- Widodo Adi Sutjipto - Knight Grand Cross
- Feisal Tanjung - Knight Grand Cross
- Maraden Panggabean - Knight Grand Cross
- Abdul Haris Nasution - Knight Grand Cross (1960)
- Eric JoS. Heffelmire - Knight Grand Cordon
- R.E. Martadinata - Knight Grand Cross
- Hamengkubuwono IX - Knight Grand Cross
- Endriartono Sutarto - Knight Grand Cross
- L. B. Moerdani - Knight Grand Cross
- Sumitro Djojohadikusumo - Knight Grand Cross
- Kharis Suhud - Knight Grand Cross
- Ali Alatas - Knight Grand Cross (1988) & Knight Grand Cordon (2000)
- Mohamed Bolkiah - Knight Grand Cross
- Jefri Bolkiah - Knight Grand Cordon
- Mahathir Mohamad - Knight Grand Cordon (1981)
- Abdullah Ahmad Badawi - Knight Grand Cross (1994)
- Miklós Horthy - Knight Grand Cross
- The Earl Mountbatten of Burma - Knight Grand Cross
- Foster C. LaHue
- Creighton W. Abrams
- Ramon Magsaysay, 1955.
- Sir Samuel Robinson, 1923.
- Graves B. Erskine - Knight Grand Cross
- Arne Skaug.
- Pierra Vejjabul
- Joseph J. Cappucci - Knight Commander (Second Class)
- David John Collins Awarded by King Rama V in 1897 (Fourth Class)
- Frederick William Verney - Commander
- Queen Victoria
- General William Westmoreland - Knight Grand Cross
- Vice Admiral Józef Unrug
- Major General Richard Secord
- Jiri Sitler - Knight Grand Cross (2006)
- Lieutenant Commander Saman Kunan - Knight Grand Cross (2018)
- Kirill Mikhailovich Barsky - Knight Grand Cross (2019)

== See also ==
- White elephant (animal) § Thailand
