= Narong Pipathanasai =

Thai naval officer (born 1953)

- ณรงค์ พิพัฒนาศัย
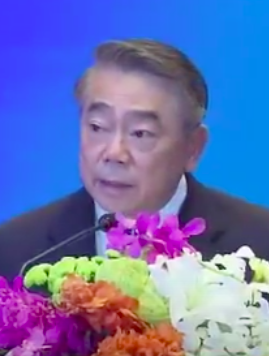
- Narong Pipathanasai in 2014

Deputy Prime Minister of Thailand
- In office 19 August 2015 – 23 November 2017
- Prime Minister: Prayut Chan-o-cha

Minister of Education
- In office 30 August 2014 – 19 August 2015
- Prime Minister: Prayut Chan-o-cha
- Preceded by: Chaturon Chaisang
- Succeeded by: Dapong Ratanasuwan

Commander in Chief of the Royal Thai Navy
- In office 1 October 2013 – 30 September 2014
- Preceded by: Surasak Runroengrom
- Succeeded by: Kraison Chansuwanit

Personal details
- Born: 7 October 1953 (age 72) Bangkok, Thailand
- Spouse: Atchara Pipathanasai
- Education: National Defence College; Royal Thai Naval Academy

Military service
- Allegiance: Thailand
- Branch/service: Royal Thai Navy
- Years of service: 1972–2014
- Rank: Admiral
- Commands: Commander-in-Chief

Narong Pipathanasai (Thai: ณรงค์ พิพัฒนาศัย, RTGS: Narong Phiphatthanasai; born 7 October 1953) is a former Thai naval officer. He served as commander-in-chief of the Royal Thai Navy from 1 October 2013 to 30 September 2014. Kraison Chansuwanit was appointed as his successor. He then served as a Minister of Education in the first cabinet of Prime Minister Prayut Chan-o-cha.

== Early life and education ==
Narong born on 7 October 1953, was the son of Lieutenant Commander Phithet and Manee Phipattanasai. He graduated from Armed Forces Academies Preparatory School and Royal Thai Naval Academy Class 70.

== Naval career ==
He previously held an important position, including the Director of Education Naval Command and Staff College, then Naval Attache in Italy, Deputy General Staff of Naval Operations, Deputy Chief of Staff of the Navy, and deputy Commander-in-Chief of the Navy before becoming the Commander in Chief of the Royal Thai Navy in 2013.

== Political career ==
After 2014 Thai coup d'état, Narong served as Minister of Education in 2014 in the Government of Prayut Chan-o-cha. Later, he was adjusted to take the position of Deputy Prime Minister on 19 August 2015.

Narong was taken out of the cabinet on 23 November 2017.

== National honours ==
- Thailand:
  - Knight Grand Cordon (Special Class) of the Most Exalted Order of the White Elephant
  - Knight Grand Cordon (Special Class) of the Most Noble Order of the Crown of Thailand
  - Border Service Medal
  - First Class of Boy Scout Citation Medal of Vajira

Military offices
Preceded by Surasak Runroengrom	Commander of the Royal Thai Navy; 2013–2014	Succeeded by Kraison Chansuwanit
