= HTMS Sukhothai =

Ratanakosin-class Thai navy corvette

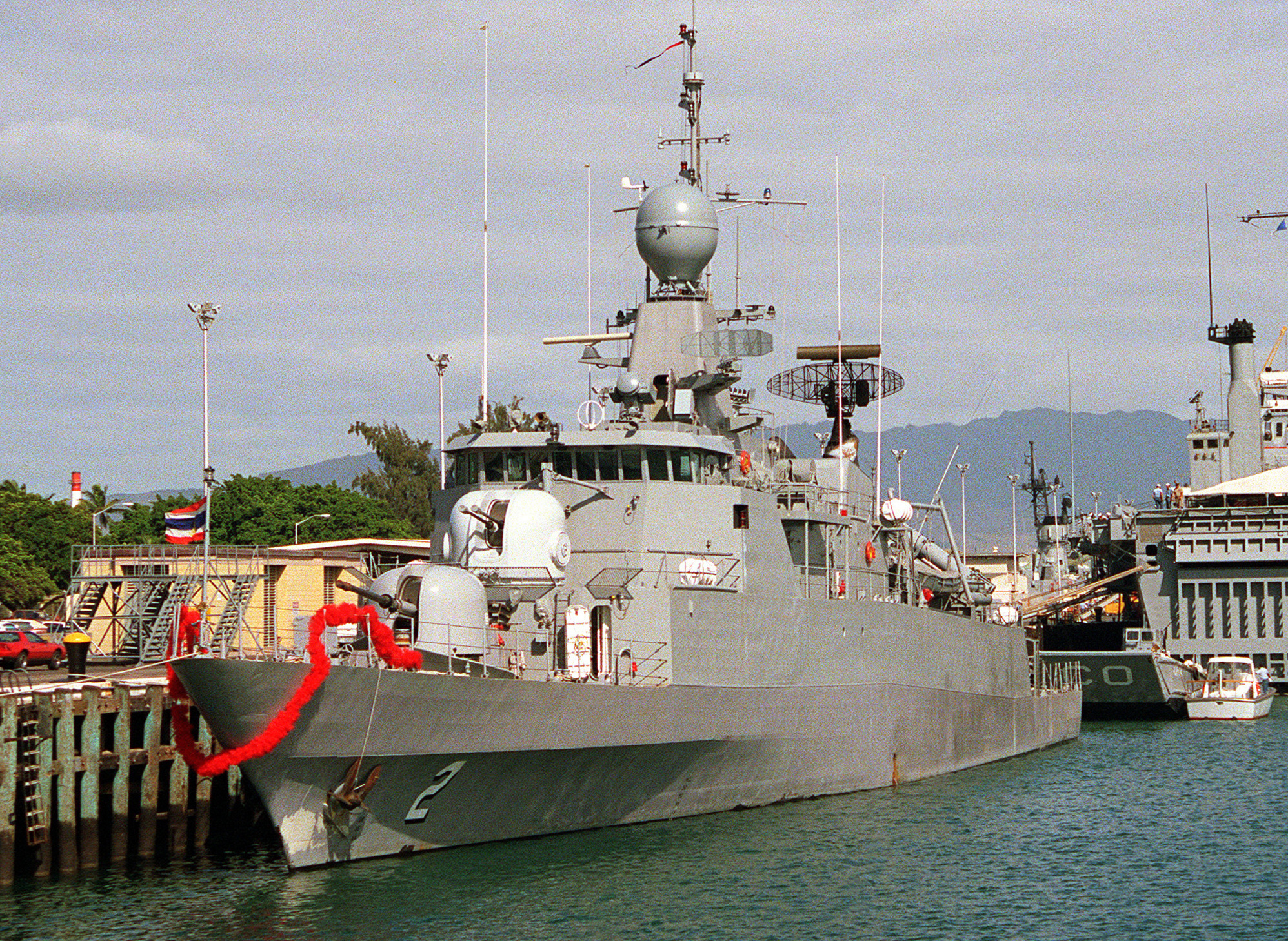
- HTMS Sukhothai in 1987

History

Thailand
- Name: HTMS Sukhothai
- Namesake: Sukhothai Kingdom
- Builder: Tacoma Boatbuilding Company, Tacoma, Washington, United States
- Laid down: 26 March 1984
- Launched: 20 July 1986
- Commissioned: 10 June 1987
- Identification: MMSI number: 567016200; Callsign: HSXV; Hull number: FS-442
- Fate: Sank on 18 December 2022
- Badge

General characteristics
- Type: Ratanakosin-class corvette
- Displacement: 960 tons
- Length: 76.8 m (252 ft 0 in)
- Beam: 9.6 m (31 ft 6 in)
- Draught: 4.5 m (14 ft 9 in)
- Speed: 26 knots (48 km/h; 30 mph) maximum
- Range: 3,000 nmi (5,600 km; 3,500 mi) at 16 kn (30 km/h; 18 mph)
- Complement: 87
- Sensors & processing systems: 1 × Decca 1226 surface-search radar; 1 × HSA ZW-06 surface-search radar; 1 × HSA DA-05 air/surface-search radar; 1 × HSA WM-25 fire-control radar; 1 × HSA LIROD-8 optical fire-control system; STN Atlas DSQS-21C hull-mounted sonar
- Armament: Missiles; 2 × quad RGM-84 Harpoon anti-ship missile launchers (8 Harpoons); 1 × octuple Albatros SAM launcher (24 Selenia Aspide SAMs); Guns; 1 × Otobreda 76 mm (3 in) gun; 2 × Bofors 40 mm (1 twin Otobreda mount); 2 × 20 mm Oerlikon GAM-B01 cannon; Torpedoes; 2 × Mark 32 triple torpedo tubes (Sting Ray torpedoes)

HTMS Sukhothai (FS-442) (Thai: เรือหลวงสุโขทัย, RTGS: Ruea Luang Sukhothai) was a corvette of the Ratanakosin class operated by the Royal Thai Navy that was launched in 1986.

On 18 December 2022 in the Gulf of Thailand, high winds and strong waves caused seawater to flow into the warship; this flooding caused the engines to fail, and the pumps also became unusable. Sukhothai continued to take on water until it eventually sank overnight. As of 2 March 2023, the Royal Thai Navy had rescued 76 sailors and found 24 dead. An additional five sailors are presumed dead but their bodies were not found.

== Characteristics ==
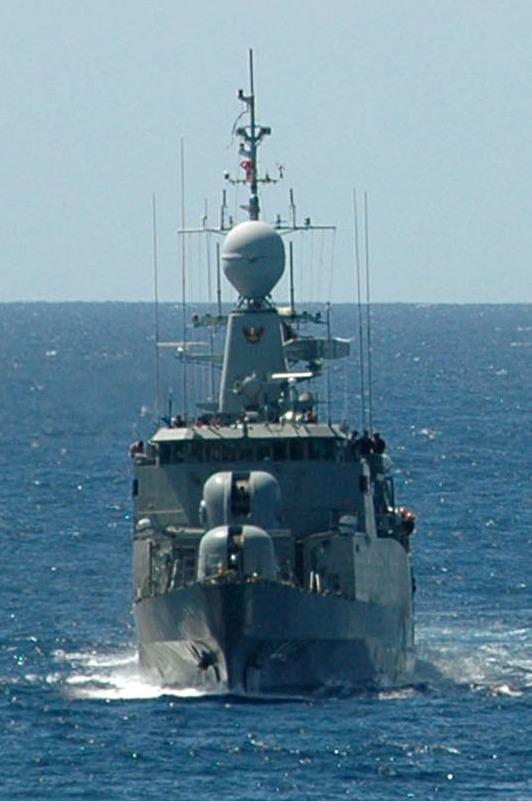
Sukhothai in the Gulf of Thailand during a CARAT 2013 training exercise

Sukhothai was a Ratanakosin-class corvette. The intended role of the Ratanakosin-class vessels was to provide surface-to-surface and surface-to-air missile capability on a highly maneuverable platform.

The Ratanakosin-class corvettes, of which there were two, were 76.8 m (252 ft 0 in) long and 9.6 m (31 ft 6 in) wide, and had a displacement of 960 tons at full load. The class shares characteristics with the Royal Saudi Navy Badr-class corvette. The ship was powered by two diesel engines running two propeller shafts, providing a maximum speed of 26 knots (48 km/h; 30 mph) and a range of 3,000 nautical miles (5,600 km; 3,500 mi) at 16 knots (30 km/h; 18 mph). The crew complement was 87, of which 15 were officers, plus an expected contingent of flag officer's staff.

Sukhothai was armed with two quadruple McDonnell Douglas Harpoon anti-ship missile launchers. She also had an octuple Selenia's Aspide surface-to-air missile launcher. The ship's gunnery was provided by one OTO Melara 76 mm gun supported by a twin Breda 40 mm cannon and a Rheinmetall 20 mm autocannon. Her torpedo armament was two triple-Mark 32 Surface Vessel Torpedo Tubes armed with Sting Ray torpedoes.

== Service history ==
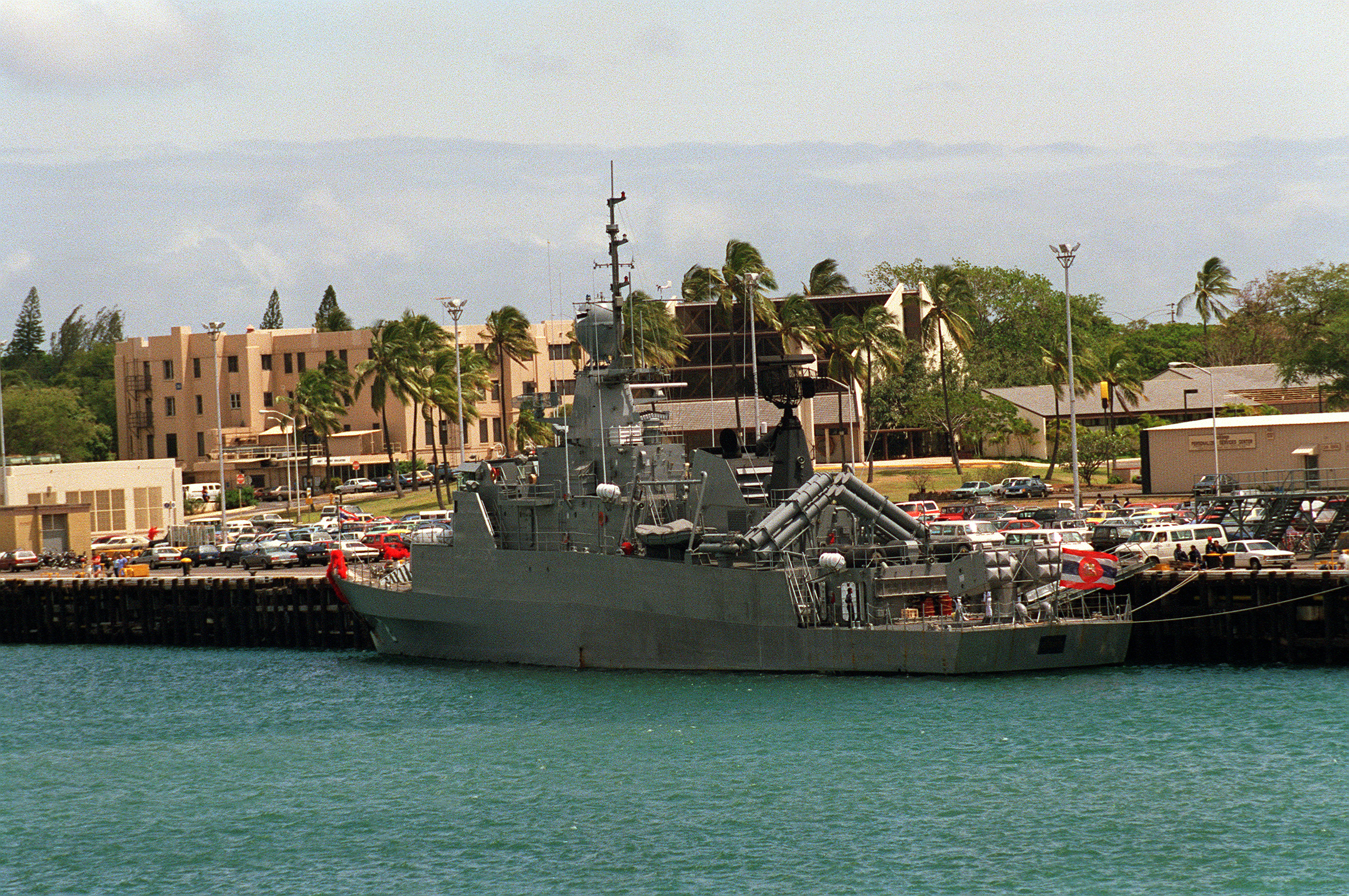
HTMS Sukhothai in 1987

Ordered for the Royal Thai Navy on 9 May 1983, the ship was laid down by Tacoma Boatbuilding Company in Tacoma, Washington, United States, on 26 March 1984. Sukhothai was launched on 20 July 1986. The ship was the last major vessel to be completed at Tacoma Boatbuilding's Yard 1 on the Hylebos Waterway. Sukhothai was commissioned into the Royal Thai Navy on 10 June 1987. She was originally given hull number 2, but this was later changed to 442.

In 1994 Sukhothai was part of the Royal Thai Navy contingent in the annual Thai-Australian military exercise AUSTHAI 94. Sukhothai launched several Aspide surface-to-air missiles against drone targets during the Cooperation Afloat Readiness and Training Cruise 1995 (CARAT 95), a maritime exercise cooperation with vessels from the United States, Singapore, Malaysia, the Philippines, and Brunei. This was the first time that the Royal Thai Navy had fired the missiles since purchasing them in 1985.

=== 2022 sinking ===
In December 2022, Sukhothai was on its way to attend a commemorative event of Prince Abhakara Kiartivongse 32 kilometres (20 mi; 17 nmi) east of Bang Saphan in the province of Prachuap Khiri Khan. A weather advisory for the area had been issued by the Thailand Meteorological Department, warning of 4-metre-high (13 ft) waves and advising ships to "proceed with caution". She was caught in a storm on 18 December. Seawater was reported to have entered an exhaust port, which led to flooding and a heavy list, followed by a short circuit in the ship's electrical system and failure of the pumps. This flooding caused the engines to fail, and the pumps became unusable. The ship sank on 18 December at around 23:30 local time (UTC+07:00) at coordinates 11°00′N 99°53′E.

Other naval ships and helicopters were sent to assist, but only HTMS Kraburi reached the vessel before she sank. As of 2 March 2023, the Royal Thai Navy had rescued 76 sailors and found 24 dead, with an additional five missing but presumed dead.

Commander-in-chief of the Royal Thai Navy admiral Choengchai Chomchoengpaet said that there were not enough life jackets on board the ship for the regular crew plus thirty extra people who were to take part in a ceremony, but that the chances of survival were the same with or without life jackets.

As of 13 January 2023, the Royal Thai Navy said it planned to raise and salvage the sunken ship due to environmental and safety concerns, and also expressed an aspirational concept to potentially refit the warship. The navy said it would use a budget of ฿100M and allow companies to bid on the retrieval. The navy specified that the warship should be recovered whole and mostly intact. Although the bidding process was completed, the tender was later cancelled due to restrictions of the United States Foreign Military Sales Act.

In February 2023, the Thai Ministry of Defense announced that the five missing sailors were presumed killed in the line of duty.

==== 2024 light salvage operation ====
On 22 February 2024 a light salvage operation was launched from Royal Thai Navy in cooperation with US Navy under Cobra Gold military exercises 2024. The purpose of the operation was to search for the five missing crew members and remove hazardous materials from the wreck of Sukhothai. The operation ended on 12 March and a memorial monument is planned.

==== Investigation results ====
In April 2024, the Royal Thai Navy released the findings of divers, which led to the conclusion that the ship had been lost due to flooding primarily from three holes, one in the side from the hull which was presumed to be from floating debris, one on the forecastle deck where the waves ripped up the forward breakwater, and a hole in the fiberglass OTO Melara 76mm turret. These holes let water into the gun bay of the forward turret before flowing into the electrical room behind it. The above waterline flooding led to a loss of stability which created a list that would develop in the coming hours before letting in water through deck penetrations such as air vents, resulting in the loss of the ship. Valiant damage control efforts were made by the crew but it was not enough to save the ship. Submersible pumps did not work while submerged, or electrically shocked the crew while working.

The only person to face any consequences for the sinking was the ship's captain who faced minor disciplinary measures.

Admiral Adung Phan-iam, the previous navy chief promised to publish the final report on Sukhotai's sinking. The report has been completed but has not been published. The current navy chief has not said anything on this matter.

==== Memorial monument of HTMS Sukhothai ====
Admiral Adung Phan-iam, Commander-in-Chief of the Royal Thai Navy, unveiled a memorial monument dedicated to the sunken warship HTMS Sukhothai on September 24, 2024. The ceremony was held to honor the 29 crew members who perished or went missing during the ship's sinking in December 2022.The event was quietly done with minimal media presence.
