= Chatchai =

Chatchai is the romanization of two Thai-language masculine given names: ฉัตรชัย (pronounced [tɕʰàt.tɕʰāj], roughly 'umbrella of victory') and ชาติชาย ([tɕʰâːt.tɕʰāːj], meaning 'male life' or 'manly'). The latter is also spelled Chartchai, among others.

Notable people with the given name ฉัตรชัย include:

- Chatchai Singwangcha, Thai boxer
- Chatchai-decha Butdee, Thai boxer
- Chatchai Plengpanich, Thai actor
- Chatchai Budprom, Thai footballer
- Chatchai Koompraya, Thai footballer
- Chatchai Narkwijit, Thai footballer

Notable people with the given name ชาติชาย include:

- Chatichai Choonhavan, former prime minister
- Chartchai Chionoi, professional boxer
- Chartchai Ngamsan, actor
- Chatchai Saengdao, footballer
- Chatchai Sriworakan, Navy commander
- Chartchai Tiptamai, boxer known professionally as Kongtoranee Payakaroon
