= List of commanders-in-chief of the Royal Thai Navy =

Chief of the Royal Thai Navy
- ผู้บัญชาการทหารเรือ
- Rank flag of the commander-in-chief
- Incumbent; Admiral Pairote Fuengchan since 1 October 2025
- Member of: Royal Thai Navy
- Reports to: Minister of Defence
- Nominator: Minister of Defence
- Appointer: King of Thailand
- Term length: Until retired
- Inaugural holder: Prince Sai Sanidwongse
- Formation: 8 April 1887
- Website: Navy leadership

The Commander-in-Chief of the Royal Thai Navy (Thai: ผู้บัญชาการทหารเรือไทย), currently Admiral Pairote Fuengchan, who is headquartered in Bangkok. Prior to 1887, the Navy was divided between the Front Palace and the Grand Palace, afterward the Navies were combined to create the Royal Siamese Navy.

The following individuals have commanded the Royal Thai Navy:

== Royal Siamese Navy ==
=== Two-Palace Navy (1851–1887) ===
Royal Palace Navy (ทหารเรือวังหลวง)

No.	Portrait	Name	Took office	Left office	Time in office
1	Chao Phraya Sri Suriyawongse	Chao Phraya Sri Suriyawongse (1808–1883)	1851	1869	17–18 years
2	Chao Phraya Surawongwaiwat [th]	Chao Phraya Surawongwaiwat (1828–1888)	1869	1887	17–18 years

Front Palace Navy (ทหารเรือวังหน้า)

No.	Portrait	Name	Took office	Left office	Time in office
1	King Pinklao	King Pinklao (1808–1866)	1851	1865	13–14 years
2	Prince Wichaichan	Prince Wichaichan (1838–1885)	1865	1885 †	19–20 years

=== Navy Department (1887–1910) ===
No.	Portrait	Name	Took office	Left office	Time in office
Officer-General to the Navy
1	Prince Sai Sanidwongse [th]	Vice Admiral; Prince Sai Sanidwongse (1845–1912)	8 April 1887	14 April 1890	3 years, 6 days
Chief of Navy Department
2	Prince Kachornchratwongse [th]	Vice Admiral; Prince Kachornchratwongse (1843–1898)	15 April 1890	25 March 1898 †	7 years, 344 days
3	Prince Narisara Nuwattiwong	General; Prince Narisara Nuwattiwong (1863–1947)	27 March 1898	31 August 1899	1 year, 157 days
4	Prince Prachak Silapakhom [th]	Major General; Prince Prachak Silapakhom (1856–1924)	2 September 1899	15 January 1900	135 days
5	Phraya Chonlayutthayothin	Vice Admiral; Phraya Chonlayutthayothin (1852–1932)	16 January 1900	29 January 1901	1 year, 13 days
—	Prince Bhanurangsi Savangwongse	Admiral of the Fleet; Prince Bhanurangsi Savangwongse (1859–1928); Acting	29 January 1901	16 February 1902	1 year, 18 days
6	Prince Bhanurangsi Savangwongse	Admiral of the Fleet; Prince Bhanurangsi Savangwongse (1859–1928)	17 February 1902	24 February 1903	1 year, 7 days
7	Prince Paribatra Sukhumbandhu	Admiral of the Fleet; Prince Paribatra Sukhumbandhu (1881–1944)	24 February 1903	10 December 1910	7 years, 289 days

=== Ministry of Navy (1910–1932) ===
No.	Portrait	Name	Title	Took office	Left office	Time in office
7	Prince Paribatra Sukhumbandhu	Admiral of the Fleet; Prince Paribatra Sukhumbandhu (1881–1944)	Minister of Navy	11 December 1910	18 June 1920	9 years, 190 days
(6)	Prince Bhanurangsi Savangwongse	Admiral of the Fleet; Prince Bhanurangsi Savangwongse (1859–1928)	Director-General of the Navy	19 June 1920	31 August 1922	2 years, 73 days
8	Prince Abhakara Kiartivongse	Admiral; Prince Abhakara Kiartivongse (1880–1923)	Minister of Navy	1 October 1922	19 May 1923 †	230 days
9	Prince Asdang Dejavudh	Admiral; Prince Asdang Dejavudh (1889–1924)	Director-General of the Navy	1 July 1923	9 February 1924 †	223 days
10	Prince Vudhijaya Chalermlabha	Admiral; Prince Vudhijaya Chalermlabha (1883–1947)	Minister of Navy	13 February 1924	30 June 1932	8 years, 138 days

== Royal Thai Navy ==
No.	Portrait	Rank	Name	Took office	Left office
11		Rear Admiral	Phraya Preechacholayudha	1932	1933
12		Captain	Phraya Wichcitcholathai	5 August 1933	15 December 1933
13 (1)		Admiral	Sindh Kamalanavin	11 January 1934	1 May 1934
14		Rear Admiral	Phraya Wichanworajak	1934	1938
13 (2)		Admiral	Sindh Kamalanavin	1938	1951
15		Admiral	Luang Pholasinthanawat	2 July 1951	1 December 1951
16		Admiral of the Fleet	Luang Yuthasastr Kosol	1951	1957
17		Admiral	Luang Chamnanarthayutha	1957	1962
18		Admiral	Sawat Phutianands	1962	1964
19		Admiral	Prince Kanchitpon Abhakara	1964	1966
20		Admiral	Charoon Charlermtiarana	1966	1971
21		Admiral	Thawin Rayananonda	1971	1972
22		Admiral	Komon Sitakalin	1972	1973
23		Admiral	Cherdchai Thomya	10 October 1973	18 November 1973
24		Admiral	Sangad Chaloryu	1973	1976
25		Admiral	Amorn Sirigaya	1976	1978
26		Admiral	Kawee Singha	1978	1980
27		Admiral	Somboon Chuaphiboon	1981	1983
28		Admiral	Prapat Chantawirat	1983	1984
29		Admiral	Niphon Sirithorn	1984	1986
30		Admiral	Thada Ditthabanchong	1986	1987
31		Admiral	Prapat Krishnachan	1987	1991
32		Admiral	Vichet Karunyavanij	1991	1993
33		Admiral	Prachet Siridej	1993	1996
34		Admiral	Wichit Chamnankarn	1996	1997
35		Admiral	Suvatchai Kasemsook	1997	1998
36		Admiral	Thira Hao-Charoen	1998	2000
37		Admiral	Prasert Boonsong	2000	2002
38		Admiral	Taweesak Somapha	2002	2003
39		Admiral	Chumpol Patchusanont	2003	2004
40		Admiral	Samphop Amrapal	2004	2005
41		Admiral	Sathiraphan Keyanon	2005	2008
42		Admiral	Khamthorn Pumhiran	2008	2011
43		Admiral	Surasak Runroengrom	2011	2013
44		Admiral	Narong Pipathanasai	2013	2014
45		Admiral	Kraison Chansuwanit	2014	2015
46		Admiral	Na Arreenich	2015	2017
47		Admiral	Naris Pratumsuwan	2017	2018
48		Admiral	Luechai Rutdit	2018	2020
49		Admiral	Chatchai Sriworakan	2020	2021
50		Admiral	Somprasong Nilsamai	2021	2022
51		Admiral	Choengchai Chomchoengpaet	2022	2023
52		Admiral	Adung Phan-iam	2023	2024
53		Admiral	Jirapol Wongwit	2024	2025
54		Admiral	Pairote Fuengchan	2025	Incumbent

== See also ==
- Royal Thai Armed Forces
- Highest Commander of the Royal Thai Armed Forces
- Chief of Defence Forces (Thailand)
- List of commanders-in-chief of the Royal Thai Army
- List of commanders-in-chief of the Royal Thai Air Force
