= Surasak Runroengrom =

Thai naval officer

- สุรศักดิ์ หรุ่นเริงรมย์
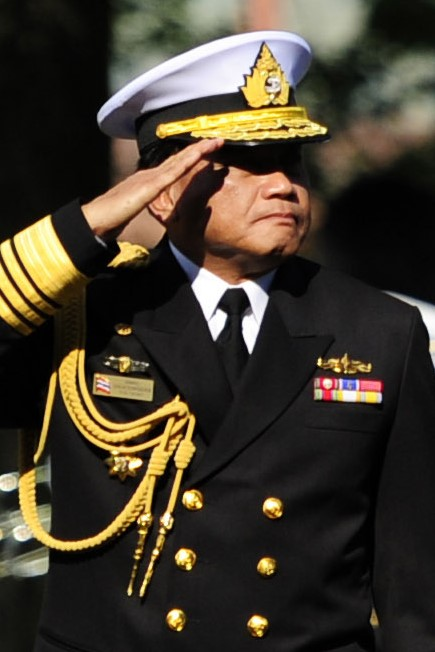

Commander of the Royal Thai Navy
- In office 1 October 2011 – 30 September 2013
- Preceded by: Khamthorn Pumhiran
- Succeeded by: Narong Pipathanasai

Personal details
- Born: 13 August 1953 (age 72)

Surasak Runroengrom (Thai: สุรศักดิ์ หรุ่นเริงรมย์; born 13 August 1953) is a former Thai naval officer. He served as commander-in-chief of the Royal Thai Navy from 1 October 2011 to 30 September 2013. Narong Pipathanasai was appointed as his successor.

Military offices
Preceded by Khamthorn Pumhiran	Commander of the Royal Thai Navy; 2011–2013	Succeeded by Narong Pipathanasai
