= Kraison Chansuwanit =

Thai naval officer

- ไกรสร จันทร์สุวานิชย์

Commander of the Royal Thai Navy
- In office 1 October 2014 – 30 September 2015
- Preceded by: Narong Pipathanasai
- Succeeded by: Na Arreenich

Personal details
- Born: 14 September 1955 (age 70)

Kraison Chansuwanit (Thai: ไกรสร จันทร์สุวานิชย์, born 14 September 1955) is a former Thai naval officer. He served as commander-in-chief of the Royal Thai Navy from 1 October 2014 to 30 September 2015. Na Arreenich was appointed as his successor.

Military offices
Preceded by Narong Pipathanasai	Commander of the Royal Thai Navy; 2014–2015	Succeeded by Na Arreenich
