= Somprasong Nilsamai =

Thai naval officer

- สมประสงค์ นิลสมัย
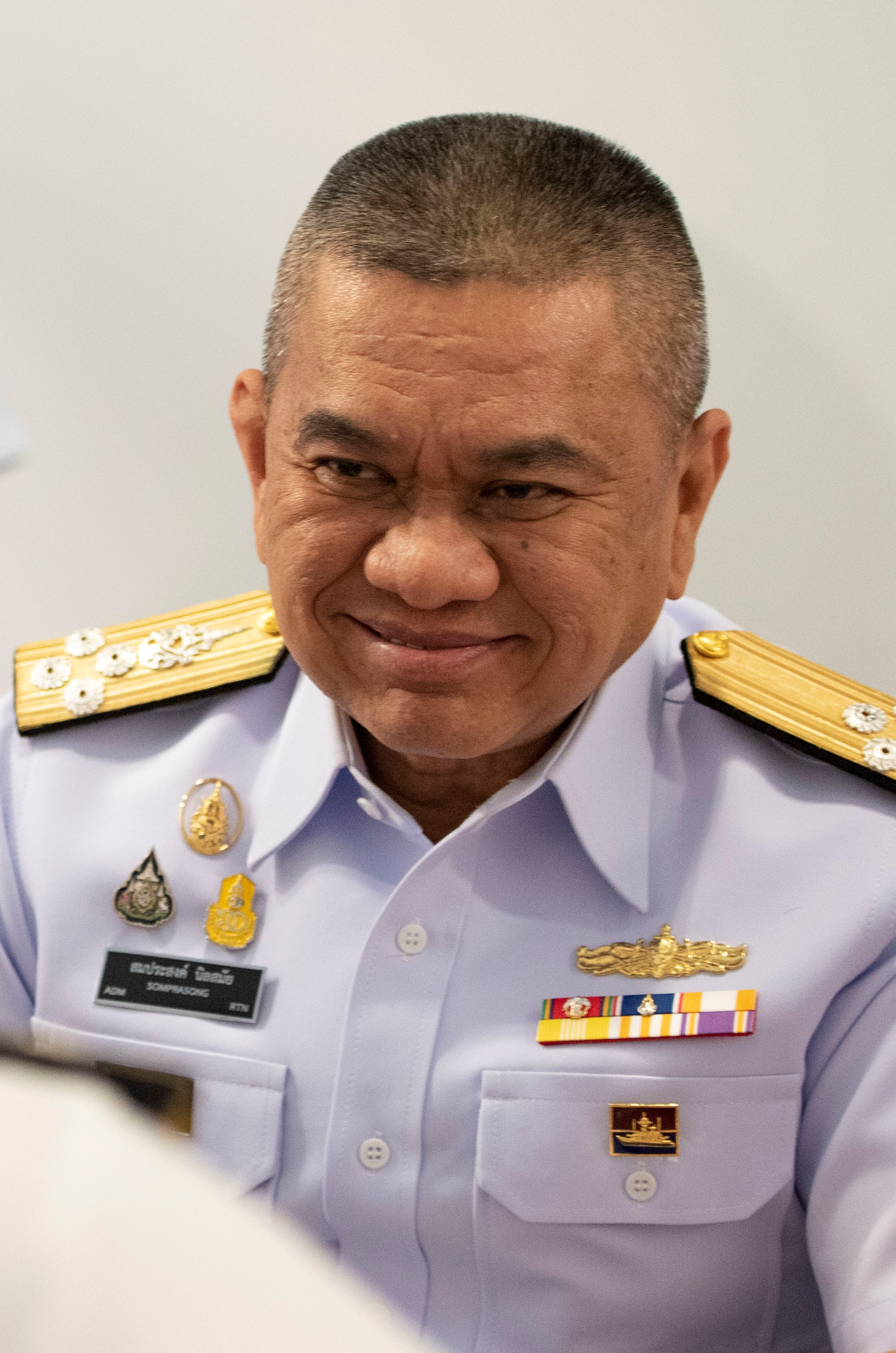

Commander of the Royal Thai Navy
- In office 1 October 2021 – 30 September 2022
- Preceded by: Chatchai Sriworakan
- Succeeded by: Choengchai Chomchoengpaet

Personal details
- Born: 27 April 1962 (age 64)

Somprasong Nilsamai (Thai: สมประสงค์ นิลสมัย, RTGS: Somprasong Ninsamai) is a Thai naval officer. From 1 October 2021 to 30 September 2022, he served as commander-in-chief of the Royal Thai Navy. Choengchai Chomchoengpaet was appointed as his successor.

Military offices
Preceded by Chatchai Sriworakan	Commander of the Royal Thai Navy; 2021–2022	Succeeded by Choengchai Chomchoengpaet
