= Choengchai Chomchoengpaet =

Thai naval officer

- เชิงชาย ชมเชิงแพทย์

Commander of the Royal Thai Navy
- In office 1 October 2022 – 30 September 2023
- Preceded by: Somprasong Nilsamai
- Succeeded by: Adung Phan-iam

Choengchai Chomchoengpaet (Thai: เชิงชาย ชมเชิงแพทย์, RTGS: Choengchai Chomchoengphaet) is a Thai naval officer. From 1 October 2022 to 30 September 2023, he served as commander-in-chief of the Royal Thai Navy. He previously served as assistant navy commander. Adung Phan-iam was appointed as his successor.

Military offices
Preceded by Somprasong Nilsamai	Commander of the Royal Thai Navy; 2022–2023	Succeeded by Adung Phan-iam
