= Media Studio =

Television production company in Thailand

Media Studio Company Limited
- Type: Limited company
- Industry: Former; Renting of venues including equipment for television production and satellite television stations Current; Produce television show and television dramas
- Founded: 1991; 35 years ago
- Headquarters: 998/3 Floor 1-4 Phahonyothin Road Chom Phon Subdistrict Chatuchak District Bangkok 10900
- Website: www.mediastudio.co.th

Media Studio Company Limited, formerly known as Media of Medias Public Company Limited, is a television show production company, entertainment media, print media, and satellite television in Thailand. It was established on April 1, 1984. Starting from being a representative for managing the distribution of advertising time for various television programs until 1989 the company has initiated further business expansion by purchasing airtime from various television stations to produce programs and sell advertising time for the programs simultaneously. However, the company has now changed its business operations to real estate, changing its name to Grand Canal Land Public Company Limited. (It is now a subsidiary of Central Pattana) In the television business, Grand Canal Land has transferred the rights to a subsidiary, Media Studio Company Limited, with Nuti Khemayothin as Managing Director, but at present the management has changed to Yaowalak Poolthong as Chief Executive Officer, along with Supaphan Wisutapa, who is Managing Director, and Pilaiwan Bunlon, Assistant Managing Director of Programs and Dramas, and has also managed television production operations to this day.
