= Pongsapat Pongcharoen =

Pongsapat Pongcharoen MPCh MWM
- พงศพัศ พงษ์เจริญ
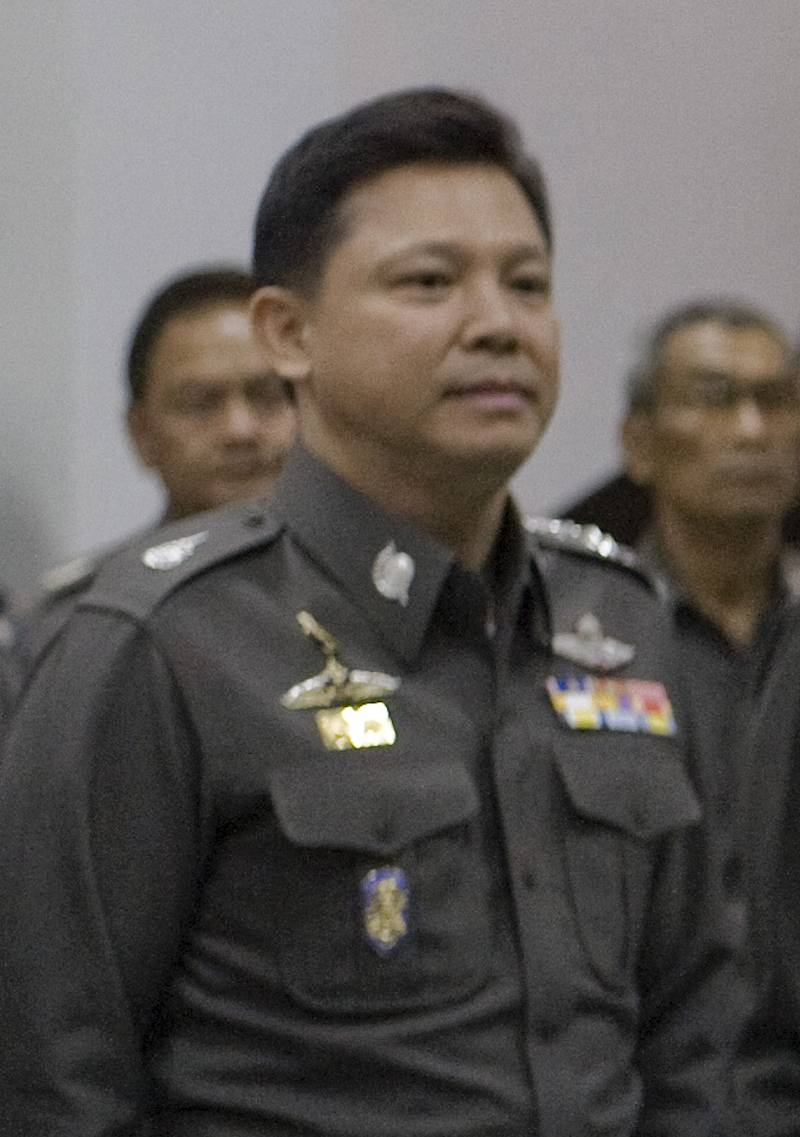
- Pongsapat Pongcharoen at Royal Thai Police headquarters in 2010

Deputy Commissioner-General of the Royal Thai Police
- In office 24 April 2013 – 30 September 2016
- In office 18 November 2011 – 14 January 2013

Personal details
- Born: 9 December 1955 (age 70) Chanthaburi, Thailand
- Party: Pheu Thai (2013)
- Spouse: Viriya Pongcharoen
- Education: Armed Forces Academies Preparatory School; Royal Police Cadet Academy; Sam Houston State University(Ph.D.)
- Profession: Politician; policeman

Military service
- Allegiance: Thailand
- Branch/service: Royal Thai Police
- Rank: Police General

Pongsapat Pongcharoen (Thai: พงศพัศ พงษ์เจริญ) was the Deputy Commissioner-General of the Royal Thai Police and 2013 Bangkok gubernatorial candidate for Pheu Thai Party.

== Early life ==
Pongsapat's former name was 'Pairut'. He changed his name on the same date the Thailand National Police Department was renamed the Royal Thai Police. He was born on December 9, 1955, at Chanthaburi Province. He graduated high school at Benjamarachootis School, 15th class of Armed Forces Academies Preparatory School. He attended the 31st class of the Royal Police Cadet Academy, where he got the highest examination score of the class every year. After he graduated from the Royal Police Cadet Academy, he was granted a scholarship from the Office of the Civil Service Commission to study Criminal Justice at Sam Houston State University.

Pongsapat married Kornpunn Pongcharoen (née Viriya). They have 3 children, Jitjuta Pongcharoen, Intouch Pongcharoen and Wanachpun Pongcharoen.

== Police career ==
Pongsapat accompanied Police General Sawang Theerasawat when he was a metropolitan police commander until he became Chief of Thailand National Police Department. Later, he was assigned as the commander of Police Computer Center and the commander of Police Public Affairs Division. In 1997, he was appointed as Police Major General. He was first of his class to be appointed as Police Major General. He then took the position of Deputy Commander of Immigration Bureau and was ranked Police Lieutenant General.

Pongsapat also served as the Royal Thai Police spokesperson. After that, he was assigned as Commander of the Royal Police Cadet Academy and became the Assistant Commissioner-General of the Royal Thai Police in 2007. In 2008, Patcharawas Wongsuwan, then Commissioner-General of the Royal Thai Police, removed him as spokesperson.

He later became Secretary General of the Office of the Narcotics Control Board.

== Royal decorations ==
Pongsapat received the following royal decorations in the Honours System of Thailand:

- 2006 – Knight Grand Cordon (Special Class) of the Most Noble Order of the Crown of Thailand
- 2010 – Knight Grand Cordon (Special Class) of The Most Noble Order of the White Elephant
