= Na Arreenich =

Thai naval officer

- ณะ อารีนิจ

Commander of the Royal Thai Navy
- In office 1 October 2015 – 30 September 2017
- Preceded by: Kraison Chansuwanit
- Succeeded by: Naris Pratumsuwan

Personal details
- Born: 8 December 1956 (age 69)

Na Arreenich (Thai: ณะ อารีนิจ, RTGS: Na Arinit; born 8 December 1956) is a former Thai naval officer. He served as commander-in-chief of the Royal Thai Navy from 1 October 2015 to 30 September 2017. Naris Pratumsuwan was appointed as his successor.

Military offices
Preceded by Kraison Chansuwanit	Commander of the Royal Thai Navy; 2015–2017	Succeeded by Naris Pratumsuwan
