= Luechai Rutdit =

Thai naval officer

- ลือชัย รุดดิษฐ์
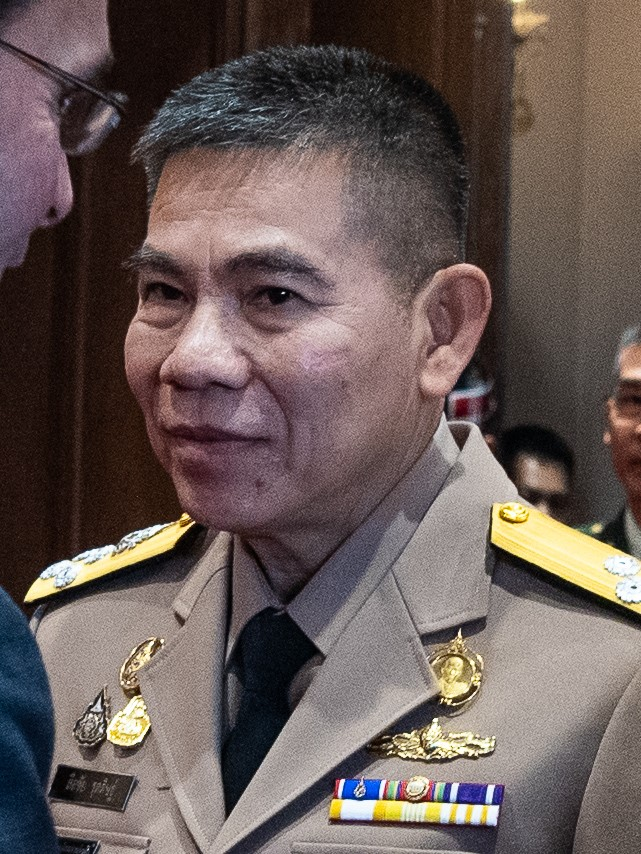
- Luechai in 2019

Commander of the Royal Thai Navy
- In office 1 October 2018 – 30 September 2020
- Preceded by: Naris Pratumsuwan
- Succeeded by: Chatchai Sriworakan

Personal details
- Born: 26 May 1960 (age 65)

Luechai Rutdit (Thai: ลือชัย รุดดิษฐ์; born 26 May 1960) is a former Thai naval officer. He served as commander-in-chief of the Royal Thai Navy from 1 October 2018 to 30 September 2020. Chatchai Sriworakan was appointed as his successor.

Military offices
Preceded by Naris Pratumsuwan	Commander of the Royal Thai Navy; 2018–2020	Succeeded by Chatchai Sriworakan
