= Naris Pratumsuwan =

Thai naval officer

- นริส ประทุมสุวรรณ

Commander of the Royal Thai Navy
- In office 1 October 2017 – 30 September 2018
- Preceded by: Na Arreenich
- Succeeded by: Luechai Rutdit

Personal details
- Born: 1 April 1958 (age 68)

Naris Pratumsuwan (Thai: นริส ประทุมสุวรรณ, RTGS: Narit Prathumsuwan; born 1 April 1958) is a former Thai naval officer. He served as commander-in-chief of the Royal Thai Navy from 1 October 2017 to 30 September 2018. Luechai Rutdit was appointed as his successor.

Military offices
Preceded by Na Arreenich	Commander of the Royal Thai Navy; 2017–2018	Succeeded by Luechai Rutdit
