= Sopon Pornchokchai =

Thai politician

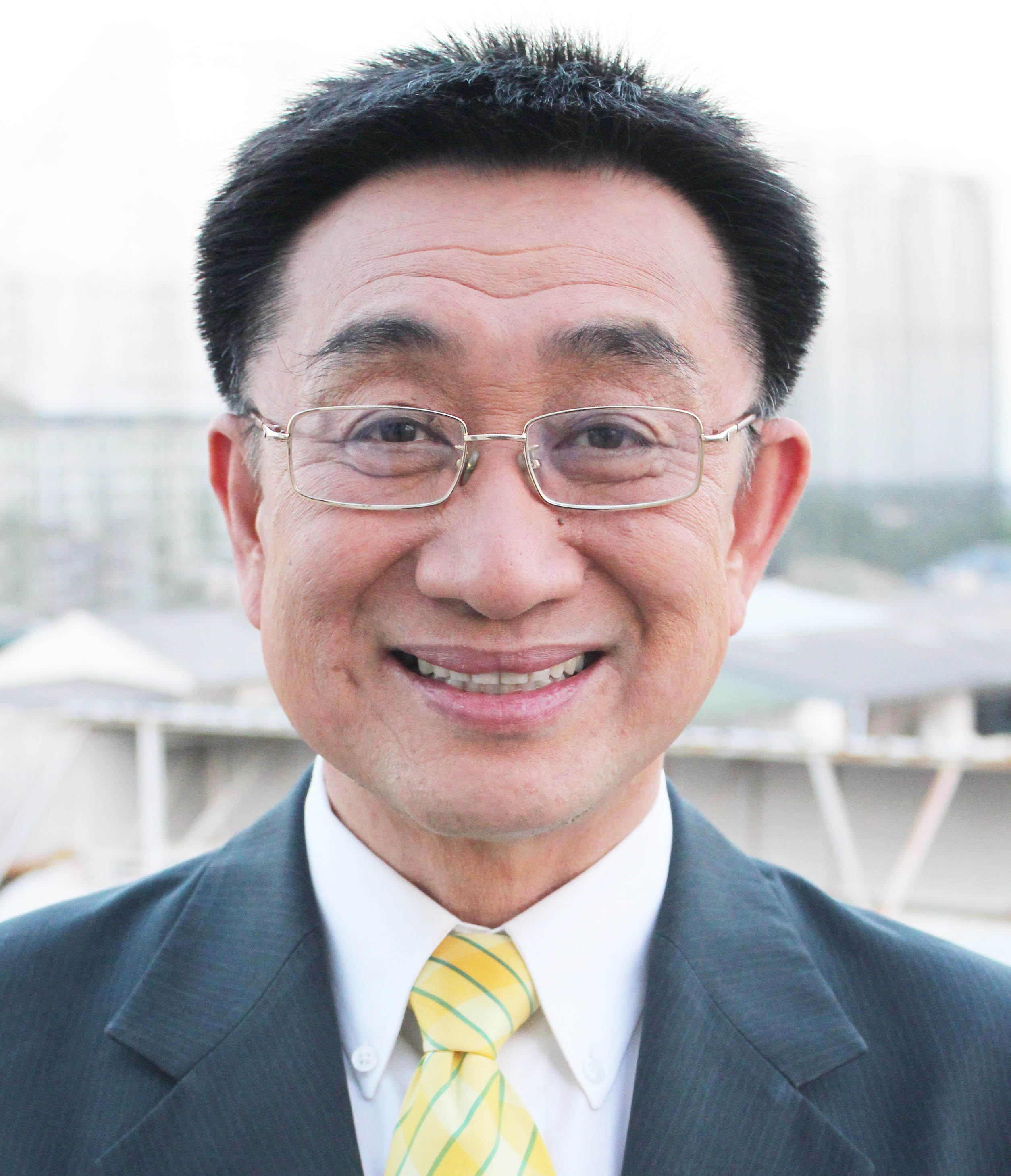
Sopon Pornchokchai

Sopon Pornchokchai (born October 6, 1958) is a property valuer and real estate researcher in the ASEAN Region, Africa and South America.

Pornchokchai is the President of the Thai Appraisal Foundation and the Agency for Real Estate Affairs, representative of the International Association of Assessing Officers to Thailand, the Director of Thai Real Estate Business School, and a member of the Global Valuation Forum of the Appraisal Foundation (USA). He discovered 1,020 slums (1985), constructed the first computer-assisted mass appraisal in Thailand (1990), forecasted 300,000 unoccupied housing units (1995 and 1998), helped materialize a property information centre for the Ministry of Finance (Thailand) (2000), the roadmap for valuation profession for the Ministry of Finance (Vietnam) (2006), the consultancy service to the Ministry of Finance (Indonesia) (2008), World Bank Indonesia (2010), the consultancy service to the Ministry of Economy and Finance (Cambodia) (2012), ASEAN Property Surveys (2015) and UN World Cities for the United Nations Human Settlements Programme (2015).

Pornchokchai lectures on valuation at graduate levels and in training courses worldwide. He was a consultant to the United Nations ESCAP and other international organizations. He gained a Ph.D. in land and housing from the Asian Institute of Technology and had further property valuation training from LRTI-Lincoln Institute of Land Policy and in housing development from Katholieke Universiteit Leuven (Belgium).
