= Chatchai Sriworakan =

Thai naval officer

- ชาติชาย ศรีวรขาน

Commander of the Royal Thai Navy
- In office 1 October 2020 – 30 September 2021
- Preceded by: Luechai Rutdit
- Succeeded by: Somprasong Nilsamai

Personal details
- Born: 13 August 1961 (age 64)

Military service
- Rank: Admiral

Chatchai Sriworakan (Thai: ชาติชาย ศรีวรขาน, RTGS: Chatchai Siworakhan; born 13 August 1961) is a Thai naval officer. From 1 October 2020 to 30 September 2021, he served as commander-in-chief of the Royal Thai Navy. Somprasong Nilsamai was appointed as his successor.

Military offices
Preceded by Luechai Rutdit	Commander of the Royal Thai Navy; 2020–2021	Succeeded by Somprasong Nilsamai
