= Adung Phan-iam =

Thai naval officer

- อะดุง พันธุ์เอี่ยม
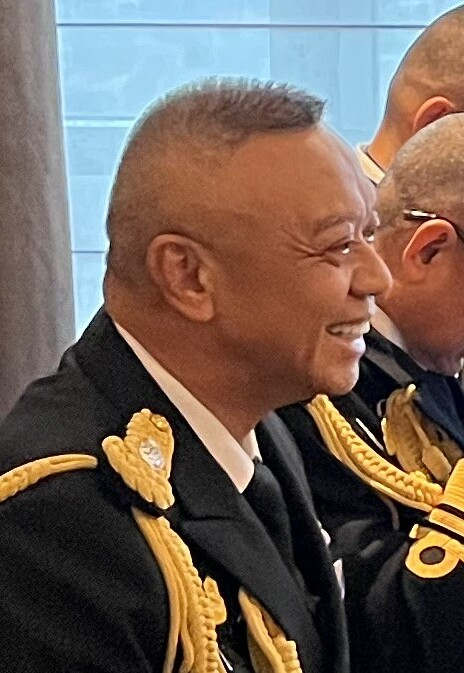

Commander of the Royal Thai Navy
- In office 1 October 2023 – 30 September 2024
- Preceded by: Choengchai Chomchoengpaet
- Succeeded by: Jirapol Wongwit

Adung Phan-iam (Thai: อะดุง พันธุ์เอี่ยม) is a Thai naval officer. From 1 October 2023 to 30 September 2024, he served as commander-in-chief of the Royal Thai Navy. Jirapol Wongwit was appointed as his successor.

In August 2024, he was awarded Singapore's Meritorious Service Medal (Military).

Military offices
Preceded by Choengchai Chomchoengpaet	Commander of the Royal Thai Navy; 2023–2024	Succeeded by Jirapol Wongwit
