= Army Women Corps Education Centre =

- Founded: 4 December 1961
- Country: Indonesia
- Type: Education centre
- Part of: Indonesian Army Doctrine, Education and Training Development Command
- Garrison/HQ: Lembang, Bandung Barat, Jawa Barat.
- Nickname(s): Pusdik Kowad
- Motto(s): Wanodya Purusottama
- Anniversaries: 4 December
- Website: www.pusdikkowad.mil.id

Commanders
- Current commander: Sri Esti Hariyati
- Wakil Komandan: -

Army Women Corps Education Centre is an educational command responsible for training Indonesian women to become soldiers for Indonesian Army. The centre operates under the auspices of Indonesian Army Doctrine, Education and Training Development Command and led by a female colonel who serves as its commander. The centre was founded on 4 December 1961 and formally opened on 10 November 1961 by Gatot Subroto. The centre was located on Lembang, West Bandung Regency, West Java.

== Commander ==
1. Kartini Hermanus (1997—2000)
2. Sri Parmini (2000).
