= Sri Parmini =

Indonesian Army officer (born 1956)

Dra. Sri Parmini M.M.
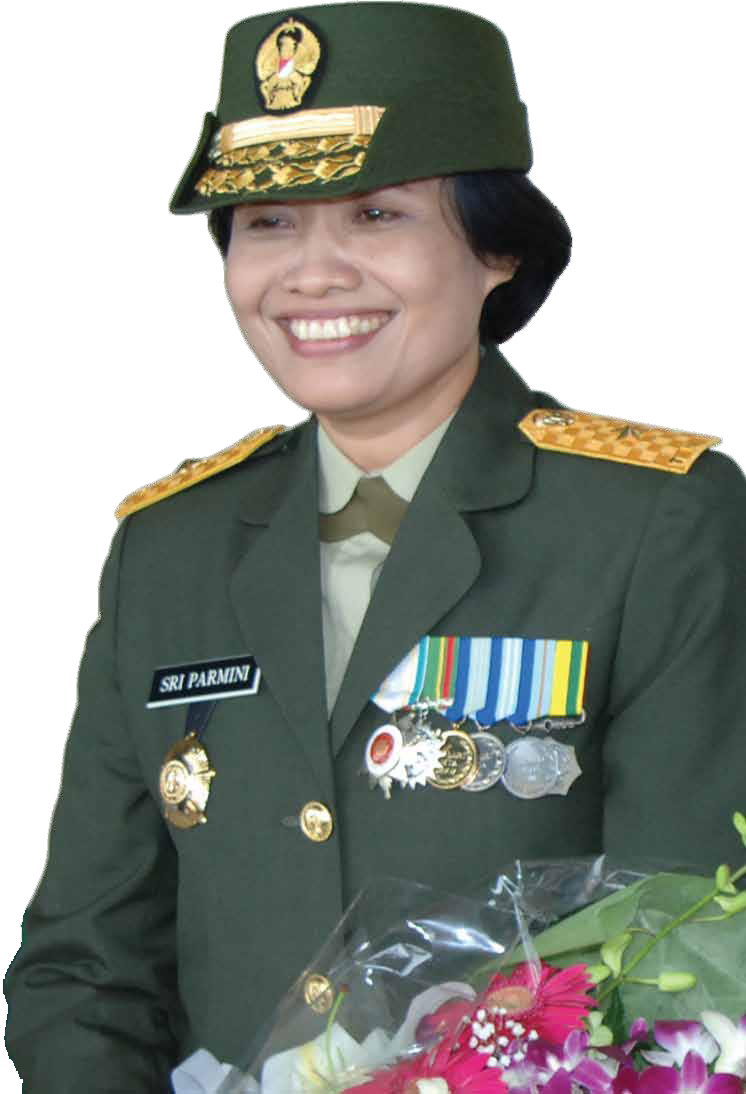
- Born: September 12, 1956; Boyolali, Jawa Tengah, Indonesia
- Spouse: Achmad Kaelani (m. 1984)
- Children: Ratih Pujiati; Arif Widyatmoko
- Military career
- Allegiance: Indonesia
- Branch: Indonesian Army
- Service years: 1981–2014
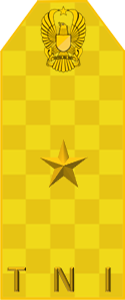
- Rank: Brigadier General TNI
- Unit: Corps Ajudan Jenderal (CAJ)

Sri Parmini (born 12 September 1956) is a retired officer of the Indonesian Army. She served as Head of the General Secretariat of the Indonesian Army and was the third woman to achieve the rank of brigadier general in the Indonesian Army.

Parmini was born in a non-military family. She spent her childhood in Boyolali and began her career as an officer in the Indonesian Army Women's Corps after graduating from Sebelas Maret University. She served in various roles, including positions at the Army Women Corps Education Centre, Army Counterintelligence and Cryptology Service, and the Kodam Jayakarta, before working as an aide officer in Army Headquarters in 2005. Four years later, she was promoted to the rank of Brigadier General, where she served as an expert officer for the Armed Forces Commander-in-Chief. Subsequently, she was transferred to the position of Head of General Secretariate of the Indonesian Armed Forces Headquarters from February to December 2013. After completing her term in this position, she continued to work as a special staff officer for the Chief of Staff of the Indonesian Army until her retirement.

== Childhood and education ==
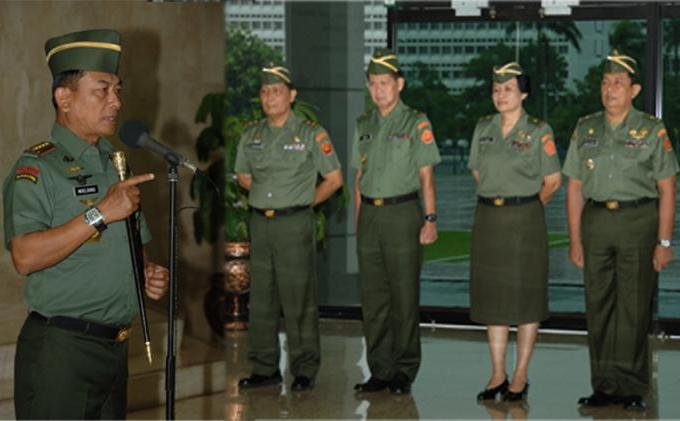
Parmini (second from the right) at the handover ceremony for the Chief of the TNI Health Center and the Head of the Medical Centre on December 31, 2013

Parmini was born on 12 September 1956 in Boyolali, Central Java, as the eldest of four siblings. Her father was a primary school teacher, while her mother was a housewife who supported the family by trading in mining products. She was raised in Boyolali and completed her elementary to high school education in her hometown.

After graduating from high school, she pursued higher education at the Department of Social Education, Faculty of Education, at Sebelas Maret University. Before her graduation, she accidentally came across a brochure from the Surakarta Military District Command regarding an opportunity to join the Indonesian Army Women's Corps for women who had already completed higher education. She tried to register because she always had an ambition to become a soldier when she was a child.

When Parmini tried to register to be a candidate in the Army Women's Corps, the registration process was already closed. However, a noncommissioned officer named Koesnan assisted her in registering. Parmini subsequently underwent a selection process that spanned several days in Bandung and was accepted as a candidate officer for the Army Women's Corps after successfully passing the selection.

Parmini, who had become a candidate officer, then met with her parents and informed them that she had passed the selection. Initially, both of her parents were unhappy with the news because they had previously planned for Parmini to become a social science teacher in Surakarta. Her father objected to her choice to join the army, but she managed to convince him. Parmini then returned to Bandung to pursue her military education at the Army Women's Corps Education Centre. After she completed her education, she was commissioned as a first lieutenant in 1981.

== Career ==
Parmini began her service in the Indonesian Army in 1981 at the Army Women's Corps Education Centre and served as an instructor for approximately four years. She was then transferred to the Army Counterintelligence and Cryptology Service with the rank of first lieutenant. During her service at Army Counterintelligence and Cryptology, she was promoted to the rank of captain in 1987. After her tenure at Army Counterintelligence and Cryptology ended in 1991, Parmini attended the Advanced Officer Education II course to enhance her military capabilities in 1992. After finishing her course in 1993, she was promoted to the rank of major.

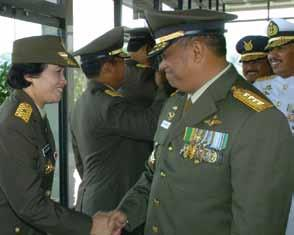
Parmini shook hands with the Chief of Staff of the Army, George Toisutta, after reporting her promotion on 15 February 2010.

In 1995, Parmini was instructed to undergo advanced military education at the Indonesian Army Command And General Staff College and became the only female student during her time at the institution. After graduating in 1996, she was reassigned to the Kodam Jayakarta as the deputy head of Military Area Command Administration at Kodam Jaya. This office handled personnel, administrative, and welfare matters for personnel within the Kodam Jaya, which raised her rank to lieutenant colonel. She held this position until 1998.

Parmini was appointed as the Commander of the Army Women's Corps Education Centre in November 2000, following two years of service as an officer without any commissioned role. During the appointment, she was promoted to the rank of colonel in 2001. Subsequently, she was reassigned as an expert officer to the Commander of the Indonesian National Armed Forces for the European and United States regions on 23 December 2009. Her reassignment was accompanied by the promotion of her rank to brigadier general. Indonesian National Armed Forces called this promotion a "special gift for Indonesian Army Women's Corps", coinciding with its recent celebration of 48 years of Indonesian Army Women's Corps on 22 December 2009. She became the third woman to achieve the rank of brigadier general in the Indonesian Army, following Kartini Hermanus and Hermawati

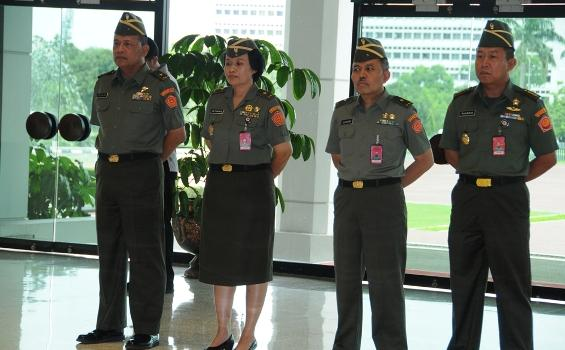
Parmini (second from the left) during the handover ceremony for the Head of the General Secretariat and the Chief of the Indonesian National Armed Force Supply Agency on 25 February 2013

Parmini served as a special staff to the Commander of the Indonesian National Armed Forces for three years. On 23 January 2013, she was reassigned to the position of Head of the General Secretariate of the Indonesian Armed Forces Headquarters. She was inaugurated into this position on 25 February 2013. During her tenure, the General Secretariate of the Indonesian Armed Forces Headquarters issued several guidelines signed by Parmini, including "Petunjuk Administrasi Tentang Administrasi Umum TNI", which pertains to administration within the Indonesian Armed Forces and "Petunjuk Teknis Penggunaan Bahasa Dalam Tulisan Dinas Di Lingkungan TNI", which pertains to the use of language in official documents within the Indonesian Armed Forces.

Just nine months after her inauguration, on 18 November 2013, the Commander of the Indonesian National Armed Forces issued a decree transferring Parmini from her position to become the Special Staff to the Chief of Staff of the Indonesian Army. (Note: Special Staff is an internal term within the Indonesian Armed Forces for officers who do not hold a specific role in the forces or are on idle status.) This decision was implemented after Parmini handed over her position to Hasan Saleh (politician) on the last day of 2013. Parmini retired from the military in 2014 and joined the Retired Indonesian Army Women Association in Jabodetabek as its chairwoman in 2017.

== Personal life ==
Parmini met her husband, Achmad Kaelani, when she was serving as an instructor at the Army Women's Corps Education Centre. Kaelani came from a family with a career in the Indonesian Air Force and often visited the office where Parmini worked to see his sibling. Parmini and Kaelani married in 1984 and had a daughter and a son. Their daughter, Ratih Pujiati, was born in the mid-1980s, while their son, Arif Widyatmoko, was born in the early 1990s. Parmini's job as an army officer often separated her from her family, and she could only see them in person on weekends because her family lived in Jakarta. They started living together in 2008 when Parmini was transferred to Jakarta.

== Orders, decorations, and medals ==

Line 1		Bintang Yudha Dharma Nararya	
Line 2	Bintang Kartika Eka Paksi Nararya	Satyalancana Dharma Bantala	Satyalancana Kesetiaan 24 years
Line 3	Satyalancana Kesetiaan 16 years	Satyalancana Kesetiaan 8 years	Satyalancana Dwidya Sistha
