= Mirza Agus =

Indonesian military officer

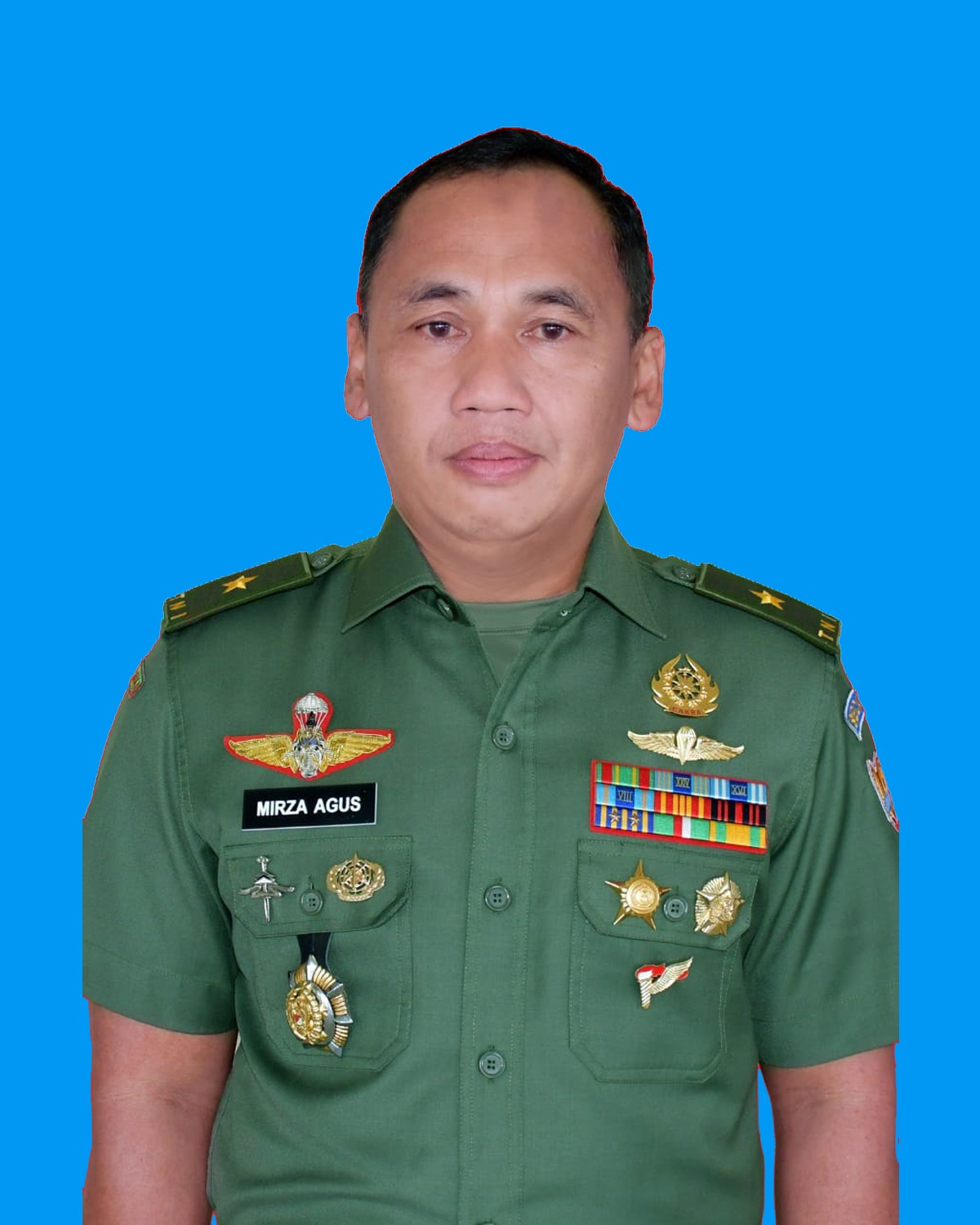
- Born: 15 January 1969 (age 57); Pekalongan, Central Java, Indonesia
- Alma mater: Indonesian Military Academy; General Achmad Yani University (S.I.P)
- Military career
- Branch: Indonesian Army
- Service years: 1990–present
- Rank: Major general
- Service number: 1900011150169
- Unit: Infantry
- Commands: North Sulawesi and Gorontalo (Merdeka) Regional Military Command; West Sumatra (Wirabraja) Military Area Command; Bogor (Suryakancana) Military Area Command; Bogor Military District; 754th Eme Neme Kangasi Infantry Battalion

Mirza Agus (born 15 January 1969) is an Indonesian military officer who is currently designated as the deputy for domestic politics coordination in the coordinating ministry for politics and security. Prior to his current appointment, Mirza served in various command and technical positions within the army and the National Resilience Institute, including as the commander of the Merdeka Regional Military Command from 2025 to 2026.

== Early life and education ==
Born in Pekalongan on 15 January 1969, Mirza was raised in his birth town, completing his education at the 1st Pekalongan State Junior High School in 1984 and 1st Pekalongan State High School in 1987. He underwent military education at the Indonesian Military Academy from 1987 to 1990. He was commissioned as a second lieutenant in the infantry corps after graduating and, upon completing commando education, joined Indonesia's special forces Kopassus. He received his bachelor's degree in governance sciences from the General Achmad Yani University.

== Military career ==
Mirza was assigned to various positions within Kopassus. He rose through the ranks and, with the rank of mayor, was appointed to command the newly established 754th Eme Neme Kangasi Infantry Battalion in Timika. He was installed in a ceremony marking the official establishment of the battalion at the army headquarters on 20 December 2004. After three years leading the infantry battalion, he was promoted to lieutenant colonel, and became the commander of Kodam III/Siliwangi's NCO candidate school.

On 14 January 2009, Mirza became the commander of the Bogor city military district, replacing Arif Rahman. As military district commander, Mirza was part of the Bogor city's local leadership council. He was sent to Aceh by late 2011 and became the assistant for logistics to the Kodam Iskandar Muda with the rank of colonel. In December 2011, Mirza instructed tenants of Kodam owned properties to immediately submit permits for property utilization. He was in the position for two years until 27 November 2013. He was then sent to West Sumatra as the chief of staff of Korem (military area command) Wirabraja, covering the entirety of the province. Mirza led handover-of-duty ceremonies on behalf of the commander and conducted inspection on the Korem's community service programs, such as free medical treatment for patients with cataracts and cleft lip conditions.

After his tour of duty in Sumatra, Mirza returned to West Java to command Korem Suryakancana, covering the former Bogor residency of Bogor, Bogor Regency, Sukabumi, Sukabumi Regency, and Cianjur Regency. In April 2017, Mirza deployed 330 army personnel to support the security of the 2017 Jakarta gubernatorial election. In September of the same year, Mirza hosted in the army area headquarters a highly publicized watch party of the Pengkhianatan G30S/PKI (1984), which was attended by president Joko Widodo and armed forces commander Gatot Nurmantyo. According to Mirza, the watch party, involving thousands of Bogor residents, screened the full uncut version of the movie.

On 27 October 2017, the armed forces commander issued a decree appointing Mirza to the one-star position of the commander of Korem Wirabraja. He received his duties from Bakti Agus Fadjari, previously his superior during his chief of staff tenure, on 11 November and was promoted to the rank of brigadier general on 12 December. Mirza continued to hold dual office until he departed Bogor to fully assume his new posting on 21 December. During President Joko Widodo's visit to West Sumatra for the National Press Day Ceremony, Mirza deployed 500 troops from the Korem to ensure the president's security. In light of the-then upcoming 2019 Indonesian general election, Mirza instructed soldiers to remain politically neutral.

Mirza was reassigned as the director for doctrine matters of the Indonesian Army Doctrine, Education and Training Development Command through the armed forces commander decree on 20 December 2018. Mirza was in charge of analyzing doctrinal matters in the army before being finalized in the army headquarters level. He was then reassigned as the deputy commander of the army officer candidate school through a decree issued on 26 April 2021.

From the army officer candidate school in Bandung, Mirza was sent to Kodam Diponegoro in Central Java as its inspector through a decree issued on 25 February 2022. Mirza officially received his duties on 15 March 2022. Mirza conducted inspection on the Kodam's program, such as the construction and reparation of village infrastructure. He returned to the army officer candidate school as institutional director through a decree dated 29 March 2023 and handed over his duties as inspector on 4 May.

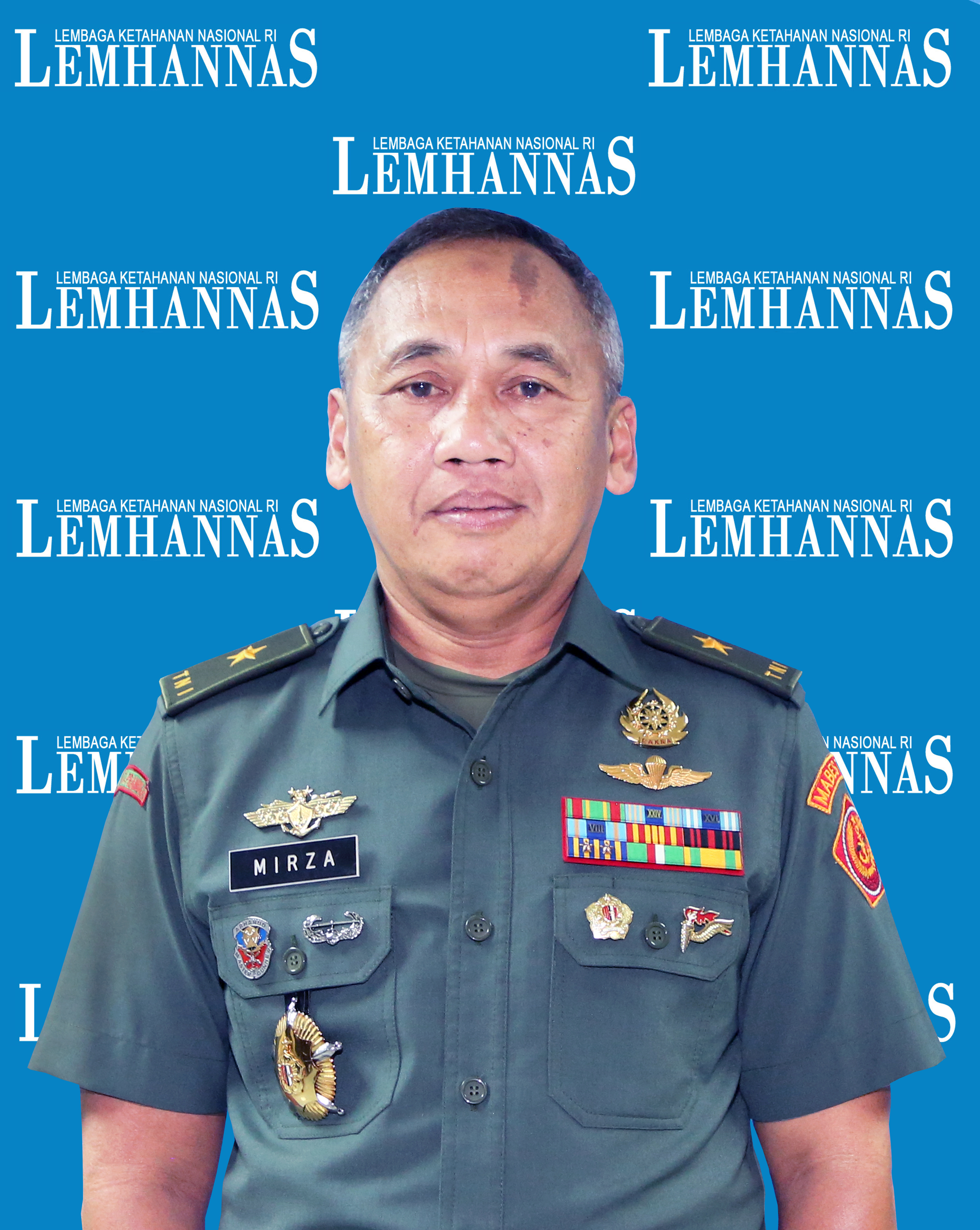
Mirza as chief of public relations bureau in the National Resilience Institute.

Mirza received his first assignment outside of the army as the chief of public relations bureau of the National Resilience Institute on 3 January 2025. He was installed on 22 January and handed over his duties in the army officer candidate school on 5 February. Less than half a year into his position, on 29 April 2025 he was promoted by decree to a two-star post as a senior analyst for national leadership in the institute. He received his second star on 25 September 2025. The next month, on 30 October 2025 he was promoted by decree as commander of Kodam XII/Merdeka. He was inducted into the position on 11 December 2025 and arrived to assume his duties a day later. Mirza was initially nominated for the post of the General Election Commission's secretary general in preparation for his retirement, but was cancelled and an official from inside the commission was appointed instead. On 6 October 2026, Mirza was appointed as the deputy for domestic politics coordination within the coordinating ministry for politics and security by the armed forces commander decree. He relinquished his duties on 16 October 2026.
