= Ade Mustikaningrat =

Indonesian military general

G.R.A.R.V. Mustikaningrat
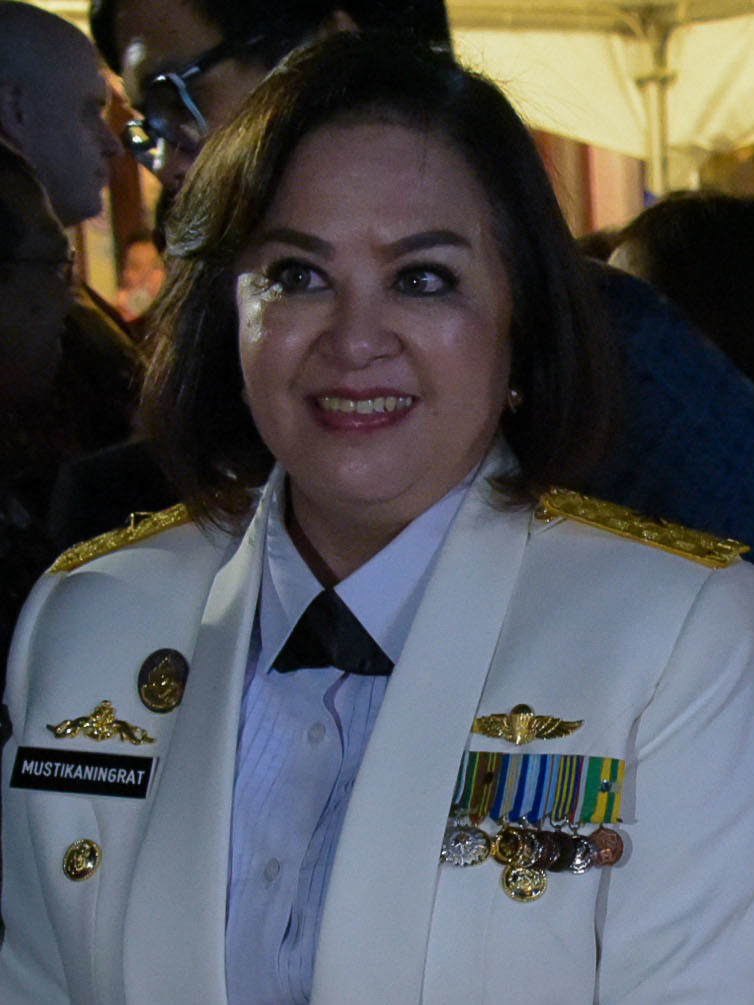
- Born: November 15, 1961 (age 64); Jakarta, Indonesia
- Education: University of Indonesia; National Defense University
- Relatives: Suffri Jusuf (father); Soeria Danoeningrat (grandfather)
- Military career
- Allegiance: Indonesia
- Branch: Indonesian Army
- Service years: 1987–2019
- Rank: Brigadier general
- Service number: 33235
- Unit: Intendance

Gusti Raden Ayu R. V. Mustikaningrat (born 15 November 1961), often referred to as Ade Mustikaningrat, was an Indonesian retired military general and cultural person. Her highest position in the military was as the Director for European and American Affairs in the State Intelligence Agency.

== Early life and education ==
Mustikaningrat was born in Jakarta, on 15 November 1961, as the daughter of Suffri Jusuf and his wife R.A. Garmini Jusuf. She came from a family of government officials, as her grandfather, Soeria Danoeningrat, who gave her name, was the former regent of Sukabumi. Her father, Suffri Jusuf, would later become Indonesia's ambassador to Laos and to Sri Lanka, and her brother, Gary Jusuf, followed his father's footstep in foreign service and became ambassador to Fiji. Her family has ties to the ancient Sumedang Larang Kingdom.

Mustikaningrat pursued most of her education overseas due to her father's occupation. She studied sinology at the University of Indonesia and graduated in 1986. She later pursued a master's degree in counterterrorism from the National Defense University and graduated in 2013.

== Career ==
Upon completing her undergraduate education, Mustikaningrat applied to join the army. She underwent a preparatory military training in 1987 and was assigned to the army's intendance unit as part of the women's corps. She also received training from Kopassus's 81st Detachment.

During her early career, Mustikaningrat became the master of ceremony for Kamera Ria, a TV programme managed by the armed forces information services and broadcast by TVRI. She hosted the show around the late months of 1989. She travelled to East Timor, where she entertained soldiers who were being stationed there.

Mustikaningrat continued her career as part of the intendance unit and rose through the ranks. She served as the Chinese interpreter for the first lady and as the aide-de-camp to Diana, Princess of Wales and Fahd of Saudi Arabia during their visit to Indonesia. She was later appointed as assistant defense attaché at the Indonesian embassy in China.

She studied at the Army Command and General Staff College in 2003 and was promoted to the rank of colonel on 1 October 2010. Prior to 2019, Mustikaningrat was the chief of the liaison subdirectorate in the State Intelligence Agency. In March 2019, Mustikaningrat was appointed as the director for European and American affairs in the agency. In accordance to her new office, she was promoted to the rank of brigadier general on 2 May 2019. She served in the position until June 2019 and retired from the military on the same year.

Upon retiring from the military, Mustikaningrat focused herself on cultural work and became the chief advisor to the Sumedang Prince Foundation (YPS, Yayasan Pangeran Sumedang). In 2023, Mustikaningrat protested a video published by the community service program of the Telkom University, which claimed that Sumedang Larang is a Muslim kingdom, and that the foundation is a direct continuation of the kingdom itself. Mustikaningrat demanded the university to take down the video.

Mustikaningrat was nominated by Indonesian Democratic Party of Struggle as the running mate for Irwansyah Putra in the 2024 Sumedang regency election.
