= Widi Prasetijono =

Indonesian military officer (born 1971)

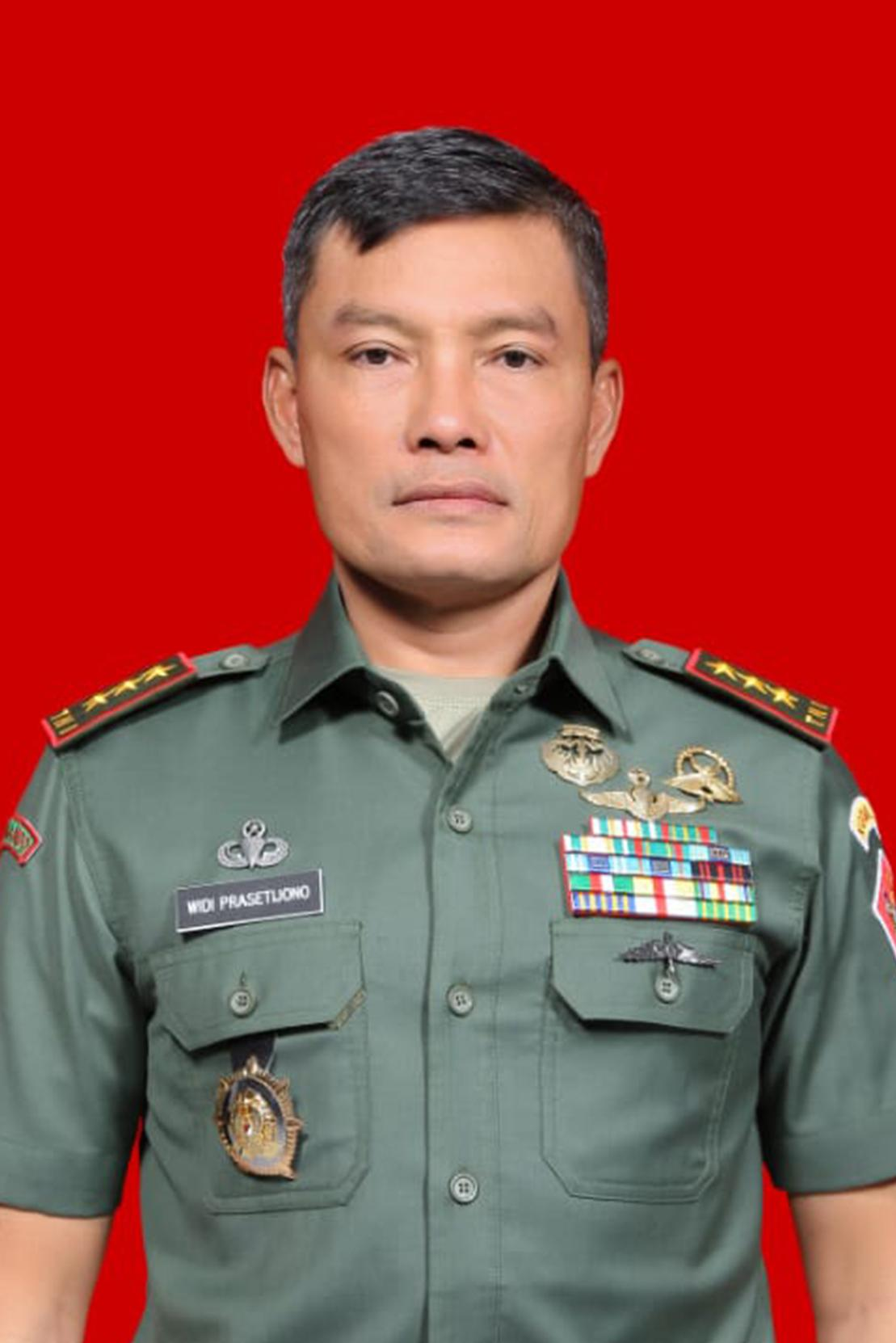
- Born: June 4, 1971 (age 55); Trenggalek, East Java, Indonesia
- Alma mater: Indonesian Military Academy; Krisnadwipayana University
- Military career
- Allegiance: Indonesian
- Branch: Indonesian Army
- Service years: 1993–present
- Rank: Lieutenant general
- Nickname: Pras
- Commands: Army Doctrine, Education and Training Leadership Command; Diponegoro Regional Military Command; Kopassus; Aji Surya Natakesuma Military Area; Warastratama Military Area; Surakarta Military District; 400th Raider Infantry Battalion
- Conflicts: Military operations in East Timor; Papua conflict

Widi Prasetijono (born 4 June 1971) is an Indonesian army general. Widi served as the commander of the Diponegoro (Central Java) Regional Military Command from 2022 to 2023 and the commander of the army doctrine, education, and training leadership command from 2023 to 2024. Widi entered the army in 1993 and held command of Kopassus and various territorial units during his career. His swift promotion in the military was associated to his closeness with President Joko Widodo due to his position as Surakarta military commander during the mayoralty of Joko Widodo and as Joko Widodo's aide-de-camp during the first two years of his presidency.

== Early life and education ==
Widi was born on 4 June 1971 in Trenggalek as the third of five children. His father, Soeroso, was a retired army soldier who married Nurhayati. His two older brothers were Widiharto and Widihartanto, while his two younger sisters were Weni Prasetyowati and Weni Prasetyowati. His parents gave him the nickname Pras to differentiate him from his brothers.

Upon completing his final high school examination, Widi applied for the Indonesian Military Academy. He was accepted and underwent four years of military training in the academy. He graduated in 1993 and was commissioned as an infantry second lieutenant.

Widi Prasetijono holds a bachelor's degree in management from the Krisnadwipayana University in 2013.

== Military career ==
=== In Kopassus ===
After graduating from the academy, Widi underwent special forces training before joining Indonesia's army elite unit, the Kopassus. He was assigned to Kopassus 2nd unit in Kandang Menjangan, Kartosuro, Sukoharjo. He reached the rank of captain in the unit and was deployed to military operations in the East Timor in 1996 and Papua in 2001. Widi's mother recalled that he was intercepted by local separatist militias in East Timor and had multiple bouts of malaria for two months in Papua. Widi was promoted to major in 2003 and reassigned to the 1st unit in Serang, Banten, where he became the chief of logistics and deputy battalion commander. He underwent advanced military education at the Indonesian Army Command and General Staff College in 2007.

=== Battalion, military district commander, and aide-de-camp ===
Widi's first post outside Kopassus was as the commander of the 400th Raider Infantry Battalion in Semarang on 22 July 2009. Widi received a promotion to the rank of lieutenant colonel and held the office for about a year until 12 October 2010. He was reassigned to the Central Java regional military command headquarters as senior assistant officer for operations for half a year. He returned to service as the commander of the Surakarta Military District on 25 May 2011, replacing Agus Subiyanto.

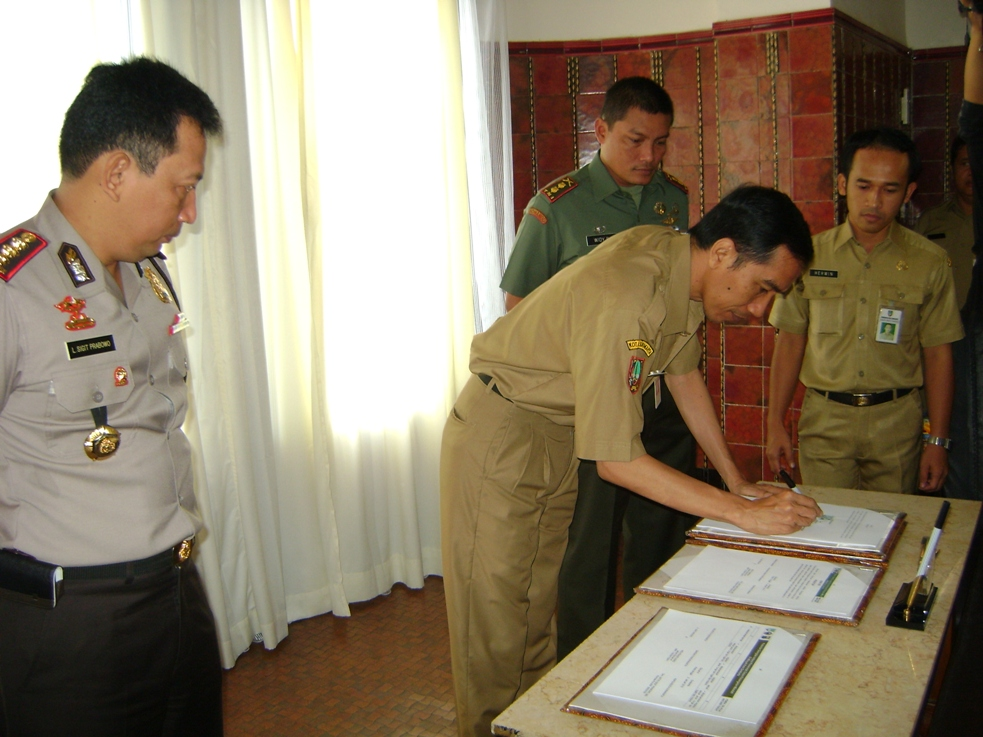
Surakarta military district commander Widi Prasetijono (right) alongside mayor Joko Widodo and police chief Listyo Sigit Prabowo signing a document on government agency synchronization in 2012.

During his time in Surakarta, Widi maintained close relations with the mayor of Surakarta Joko Widodo and police chief of Surakarta Listyo Sigit Prabowo (later replaced by Asdjima'in). The military in Surakarta, along with the city government and police, were involved in several local conflict resolution, such as the clash between residents and local warriors in Surakarta's Beringharjo market and the internal conflict in the Surakarta Sunanate. He was replaced as military district commander on 9 October 2012. Widi moved to the army headquarters in Jakarta as a senior assistant officer for personnel security, coincidentally following Joko Widodo who had earlier been elected as Jakarta's governor.

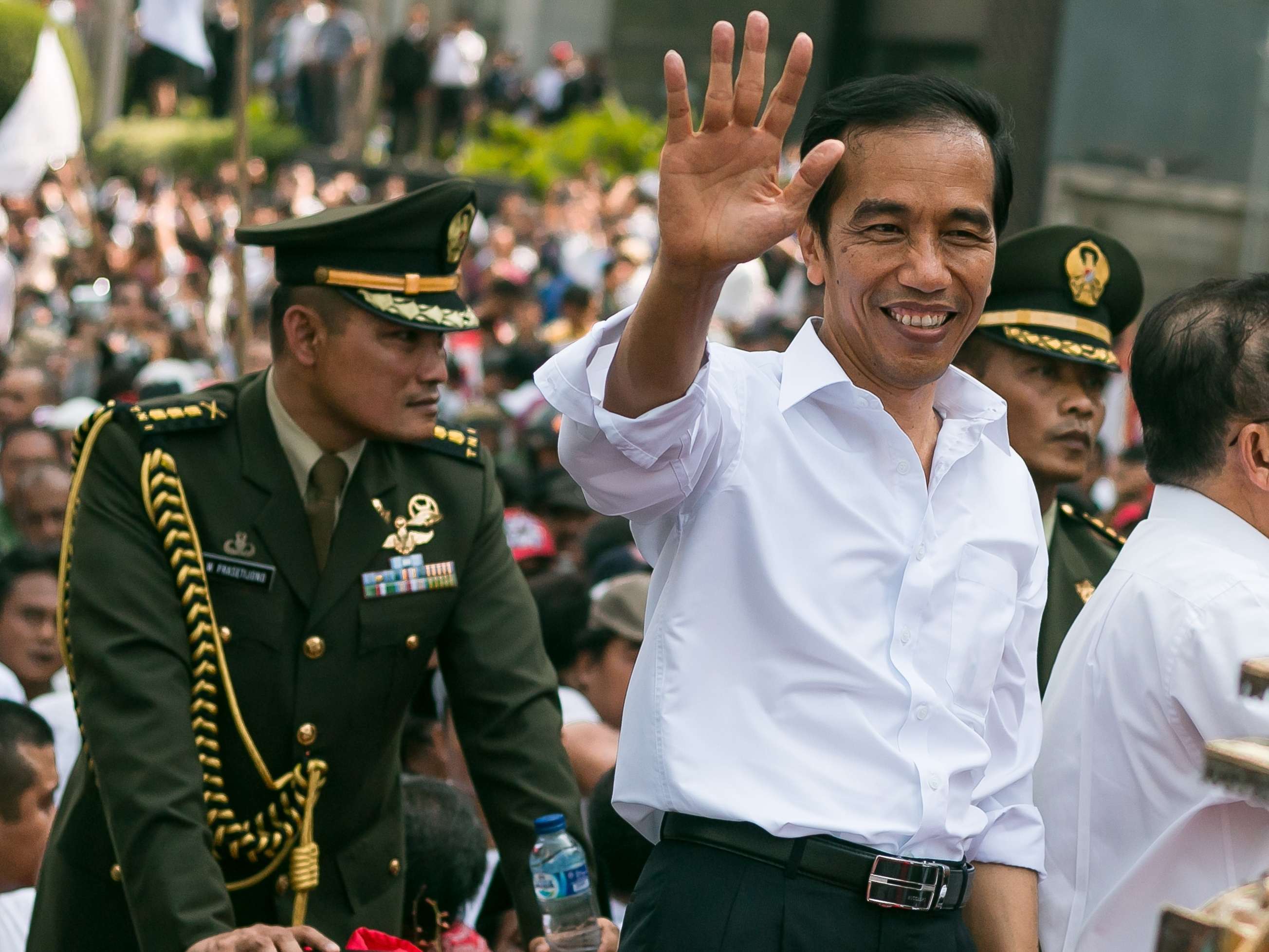
Widi Prasetijono as Joko Widodo's aide-de-camp.

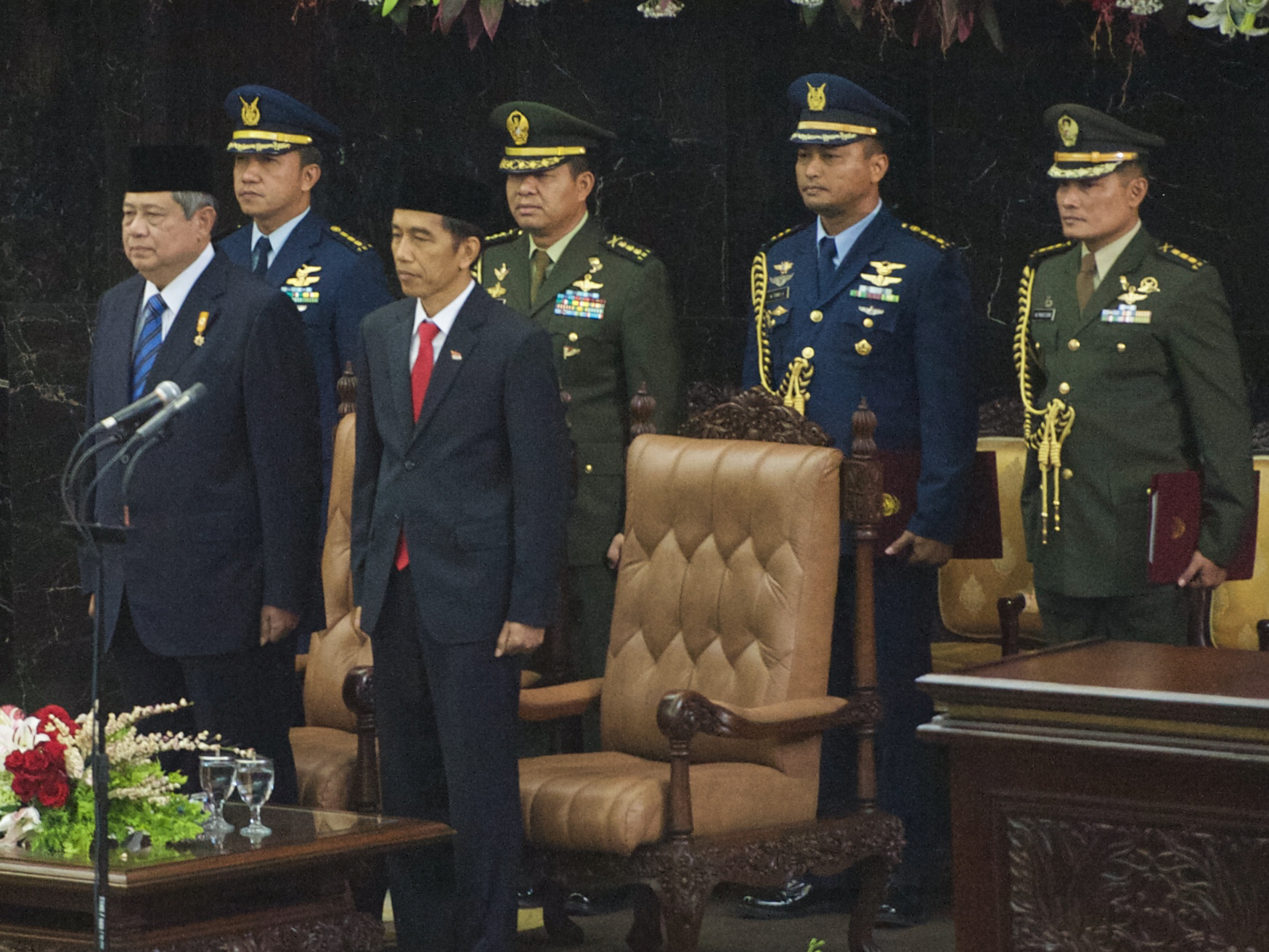
President-elect of Indonesia, Joko Widodo, and the outgoing president Susilo Bambang Yudhoyono, at Widodo's inauguration in 2014. Widi could be seen standing behind the furthest from the right.

Two years later, Joko Widodo was elected as Indonesia's seventh president in the 2014 Indonesian presidential election. Several days prior to his inauguration, Joko Widodo picked Widi as his aide-de-camp from the army. Widi appeared on the podium alongside the aide-de-camp from the air force Mohamad Tony Harjono during Joko Widodo's inaugural speech on 20 October 2014. Widi was reposted from his position as aide-de-camp to become the commander of the Siliwangi (West Java) military command training regiment in early 2016. He left the position on 6 July 2017. In a court testimony, Widi stated that he never underwent further military education in the joint command and staff college, as his prior experience as a presidential aide was considered sufficient for a promotion. Unlike other general's promotion path, Widi also never attended the National Resilience Institute.

=== Military area to military region commander ===
After serving in West Java, Widi returned to Central Java as the commander of the Warastratama Military Area, covering Surakarta and its vicinity. He was installed for the post on 23 June 2017. During his period as military area commander, Joko Widodo's daughter, Kahiyang Ayu, held a wedding reception in Surakarta with her fiancé, Bobby Nasution, in the city. Several thousand Joko Widodo loyalist and volunteers went to Surakarta for the wedding, which was accommodated by the military at the Donohudan Haj Dormitory. The position was transferred to a new officeholder on 15 January 2019.

Widi's rapid rise in the military was closely associated by military observers due to his part in the Solo Gang, a group of Jokowi’s confidants who had served in Surakarta. By the time he left Surakarta, he was appointed for a one-star position as the military area commander of East Kalimantan on 18 December 2018. He was promoted to brigadier general ten days later. He was in the position for about a year and a half before being replaced on 21 April 2020.

Widi returned to Central Java on 6 May 2020 as the chief of staff of the Central Java (Diponegoro) Regional Military Command. He oversaw major changes in service chiefs in the military command during his first month.

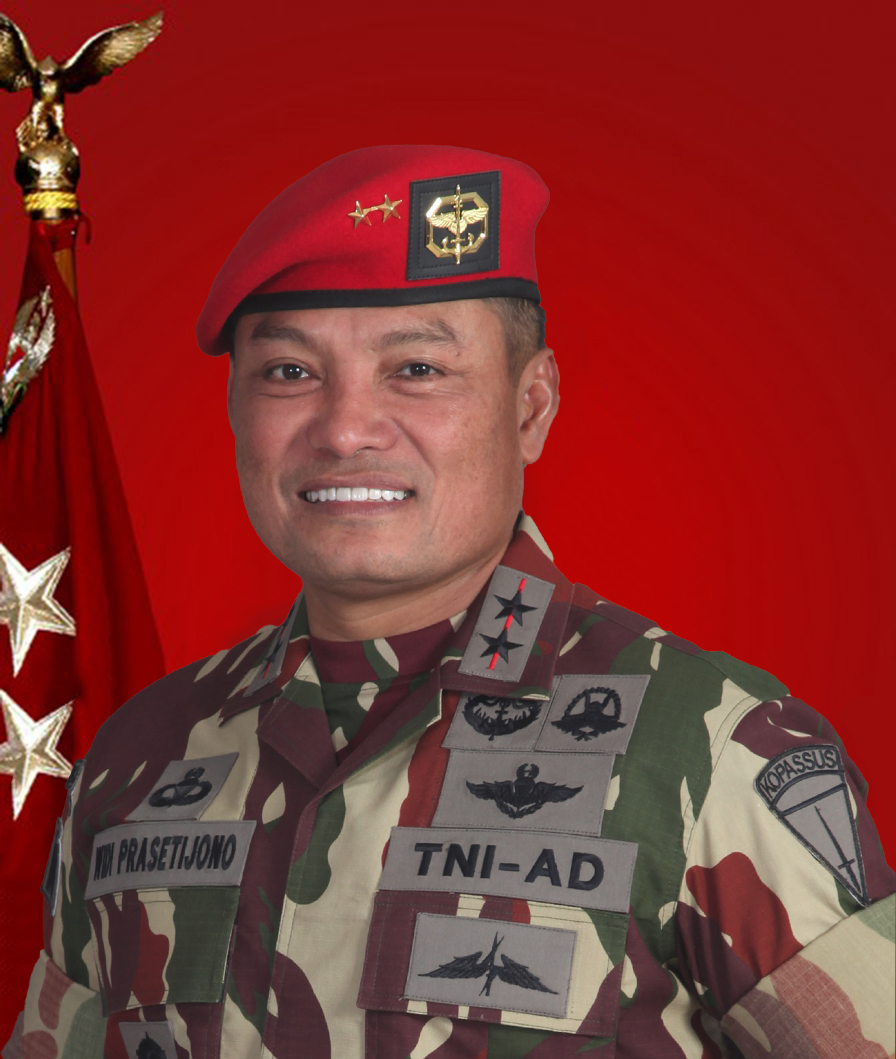
Widi as Kopassus's commanding general.

On 31 January 2022, Widi Prasetijono was promoted to the highly prestigious post of the commandant general of Kopassus, the special forces unit inside the army. His predecessor, Teguh Muji Angkasa, served for only fifty-three days in the position. He relinquished his old office as chief of staff four days later and was promoted to major general on 23 February. Less than three months later, on 8 April, a new commanding-general was installed in place of Widi. Similar to his predecessor, Widi only served for sixty-days. Despite his very short term, Widi managed to do his only personnel rotation of top Kopassus officials in late March 2022.

The swift replacement of Kopassus commanding general caught the eyes of military observers, as the position changed hands three times in a matter of four months. Merdeka reporter Erik Purnama Putra described the rotation as 'unusual'. The army spokesperson stated that the rotations were not unusual and was intended for career development and regeneration of flag officers.

Widi returned to Central Java as the commander of the military region on 8 April. At the end of the year, Deddy Suryadi, his replacement as Joko Widodo's aide-de-camp, was appointed as the chief of staff of the military region. As Central Java's military commander, Widi was tasked several times to lead the security operation for Joko Widodo's visit in the province.

=== Army training commander ===
On 24 December 2023, Widi was installed as the commander of the army doctrine, education, and training leadership command, replacing acting commander Kunto Arief Wibowo. He was promoted to lieutenant general on 4 January 2024.

On 6 December 2024, in the first mass rotation of armed forces officers under President Prabowo Subianto, Widi was removed from his position and was assigned to the Indonesian National Defence University as a lecturer. Military observers noted that his removal was due to his closeness with Joko Widodo, with analyst Selamat Ginting describing his new position as "a tragic post for a three-star general". Widi officially left his position on 30 December and was replaced by Mohammad Hasan.

In early December 2025, Widi was investigated by the attorney general of Central Java in light of his involvement in a money laundering case involving Cilacap Segara Artha, a company owned by the Cilacap Regency government. During Widi's tenure as commander, the company had purchased a piece of land from Rumpun Sari Antan, despite the land being owned by the Diponegoro military region foundation. The transaction went on despite a lack of authorization from the foundation to lease the land. Widi's wife was also summoned by the attorney general's office to the court, where she admitted to receive benefits from the land purchase. In light of Widi's legal case, on 15 December 2025 the army chief of staff issued a decree which removed Widi from the Indonesian National Defence University.

Widi was incarcerated at the Guntur super maximum security military prison for five months, an experience he described in his testimony as "much tougher" than "the joint command and staff college and the National Resilience Institute". During his arrest, he was put in an isolated cell with only a single window above him, and was not allowed to do Friday prayers. His family was only allowed to see him after 40 days of arrest. After five months, he was transferred to the Cimanggis Military Prison in Depok, where he joined his subordinates who were imprisoned for the same case as him.

== Personal life ==
Widi is married to Novita Permatasari.
