= Fadjar Prasetyo =

Indonesian Air Force officer

Air Chief Marshall (Ret.) Fadjar Prasetyo
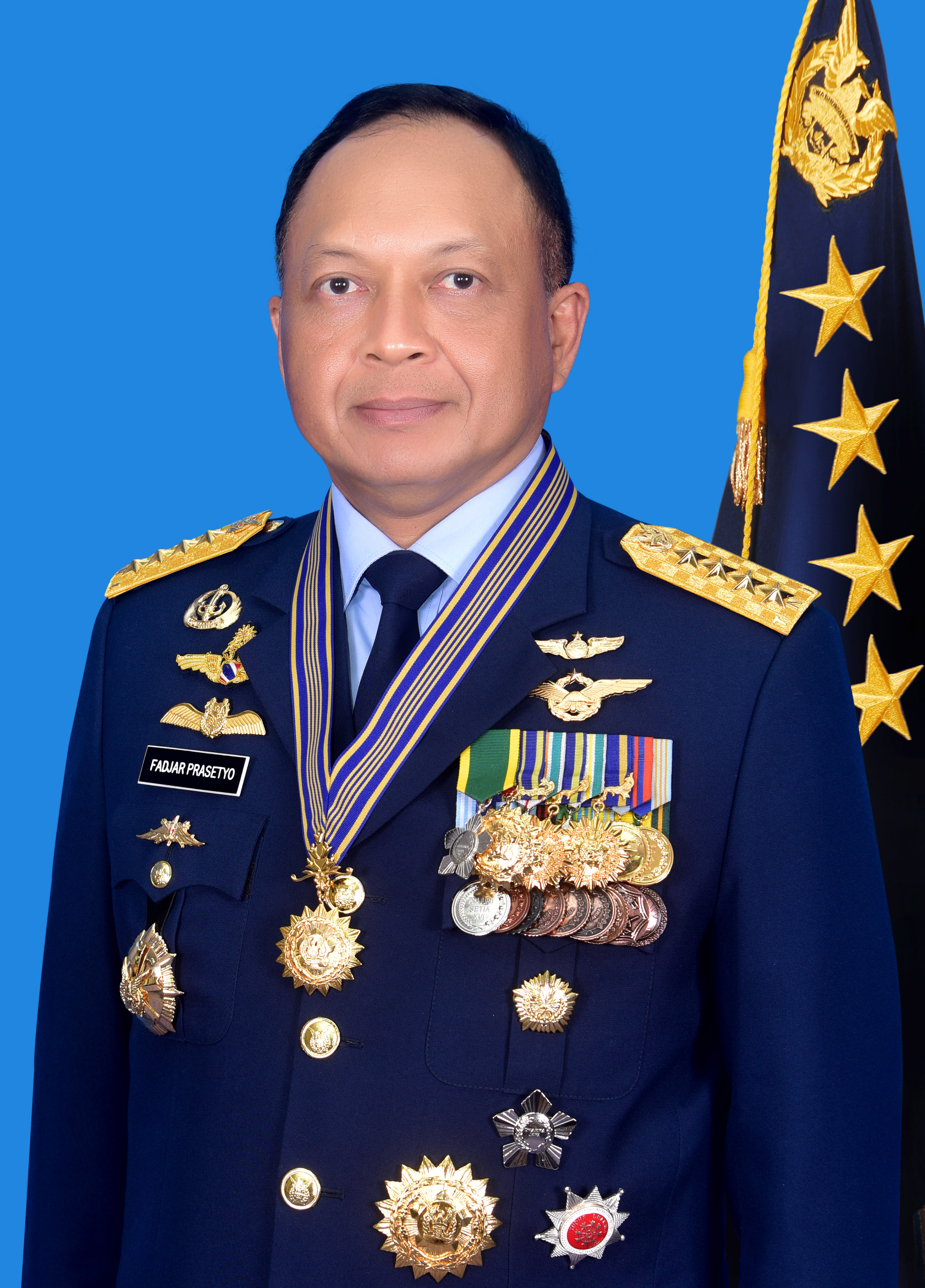

Chief of Staff of the Indonesian Air Force
- In office 20 May 2020 – 5 April 2024
- President: Joko Widodo
- Preceded by: ACM Yuyu Sutisna
- Succeeded by: ACM Mohamad Tony Harjono

Commander of Joint Territorial Defense Commands II
- In office 24 September 2019 – 26 May 2020
- Preceded by: Position established
- Succeeded by: AM Imran Baidirus

Commander of Air Operations Command I
- In office 24 September 2018 – 24 September 2019
- Preceded by: AVM Nanang Santoso
- Succeeded by: AVM Muhammad Khairil Lubis

Personal details
- Born: 9 April 1966 (age 60) Jakarta, Indonesia

Military service
- Allegiance: Indonesia
- Branch/service: Indonesian Air Force
- Years of service: 1988–2024
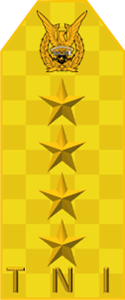
- Rank: Air chief marshal

Air Chief Marshal (Ret.) Fadjar Prasetyo (born 9 April 1966) is an Indonesian air chief marshal who was Chief of Staff of the Indonesian Air Force from May 2020 to April 2024.

== Career ==
Fadjar was born in Jakarta on 9 April 1966 and graduated from the Indonesian Air Force Academy in 1988. He began his air force career as an A-4 Skyhawk pilot between 1990 and 1995 at Hasanuddin Air Base with the callsign Bobcat. He was then reassigned to Halim Air Base where he became an aviation officer aboard Fokker F28 and Boeing 707 planes. He then piloted a Boeing 737.

Afterwards, he was assigned to the Indonesian Embassy in Malaysia as a defense attache for the air force. Other positions he had taken included being head of air force training and a wing commander at Halim. In 2016, he was appointed the commander at Halim Airbase, being ranked an air commodore by the end of his tenure, and between 2018 and 2019 he served as commander of operational zones 2 (2018) and 1 (2018–2019) of the airforce. Shortly before he was appointed Chief of Staff, he was joint commander of defensive region 2, serving directly under the Commander of the Indonesian National Armed Forces. During this period, he was promoted to air marshal in November 2019.

He was appointed air force chief of staff on 20 May 2020, and received a promotion to a four-star rank (air chief marshal). Shortly after he was sworn in, he released a 100-day program as chief of staff, which included among others managing the impact of the ongoing COVID-19 pandemic. In September 2020, Fadjar inaugurated a cyber unit (Satsiber) for the Indonesian Air Force. Fadjar attended the 2024 Indonesian Air Force Leadership Meeting in Jakarta.

== Honours ==
=== National ===
- Bintang Mahaputera Utama - 14 August 2024.

=== Foreign ===
- Australia:
  - Honorary Officer of the Order of Australia (AO) - 16 October 2023.
- France:
  - Commander of the National Order of Merit -11 November 2023.
- Malaysia:
  - Courageous Commander of The Most Gallant Order of Military Service (PGAT) - 17 October 2023.
- Singapore:
  - Meritorious Service Medal (Military) (PJG)- 13 October 2022.
- United States:
  - Commander of the Legion of Merit - 18 May 2022.

Military offices
| Preceded by Yuyu Sutisna | Chief of Staff of Indonesian Air Force; 2020–2024 | Succeeded by Mohamad Tony Harjono |
