= Kartini Hermanus =

Indonesian general (1949–2021)

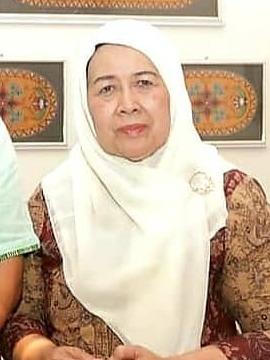
- Born: 2 August 1949; Surakarta, Indonesia
- Died: 24 August 2021 (aged 72); Bandung, West Java
- Spouse: Pieter Hermanus
- Children: 4
- Military career
- Service years: 1970–2004
- Rank: Brigadier general
- Unit: Adjutant General Corps

Kartini Hermanus (2 August 1949 – 24 August 2021) was an Indonesian military officer who became the first female general in the Indonesian Army.

== Early life ==
Hermanus was born on 2 August 1949 in Surakarta, Central Java. After attending the Medical Faculty of the Sam Ratulangi University for two years, she enlisted herself at the officers' conscription school in 1970.

== Military career ==
After graduating from the school, Hermanus joined the army as a member of the Adjutant General Corps. She attended the Indonesian Army Command and General Staff College in 1993 and graduated the next year. Hermanus and another military officer named Colonel Haerasma were the only female students out of the 201 military officers that attended the college that year.

On 27 May 1997, Hermanus was installed as the superintendent of the Women's Army Corps Education Center. She was installed after the body's separation from the Indonesian Army Doctrine, Education and Training Development Command.

After serving as superintendent for three years, Hermanus was appointed as an expert staff for social and cultural affairs to the Army chief of staff in early November 2000. In accordance to her new office, Hermanus was promoted to brigadier general on 1 December 2000, making her the first female military general in the Indonesian Army. She officially retired from the military on 11 November 2004.

== Personal life ==
Kartini Hermanus was married to Pieter Hermanus, a retired army colonel and the designer of Pindad SS2. The couple has four children, namely Ondre Hermanus, Marta Hermanus, Jimmy Hermanus, and Terry Hermanus.

When asked about whether she would still respect her husband after she outranked him in 2000, Kartini Hermanus stated that "If [I'm] at home, of course I would still respect my husband. After all, he is [already] retired [from the military]."
