= Syaukat Banjaransari =

Indonesian general (1936–2023)

Military Secretary to the President
- In office 14 February 1986 – 3 August 1993
- President: Suharto
- Preceded by: Kardono
- Succeeded by: Pranowo

Personal details
- Born: 26 November 1936 Kutoarjo, Dutch East Indies
- Died: 2 July 2023 (aged 86) Gatot Soebroto Army Hospital, Jakarta, Indonesia
- Education: National Military Academy

Military service
- Allegiance: Indonesia
- Branch/service: Indonesian Army
- Years of service: 1960–1994
- Rank: Major general
- Unit: Air Defense Artillery
- Commands: 9th Air Defense Artillery Battalion; Army Strategic Reserve Command

Syaukat Banjaransari (26 November 1936 – 2 July 2023) was an Indonesian army general and artist. He was the Military Secretary to the President from 1986 to 1992 and the Inspector General for Development from 1992 to 1996.

== Early life ==
Syaukat Banjaransari was born on 26 November 1936 in Kutoarjo, a small town in the Central Java province of the Dutch East Indies. His family later moved to Yogyakarta and he later spent most of his childhood there. Syaukat was enrolled to a People's School (equivalent to elementary school) in Yogyakarta and lived at the Merbabu Street in Yogyakarta, which also housed future president Suharto, who at that time was a military commander with the rank of lieutenant colonel. During an encounter with Suharto, Syaukat was asked by Suharto to help him pull his bicycle.

== Education and military career ==
Syaukat continued his education in Yogyakarta and graduated from the 1st Yogyakarta Junior High School and the Padmanaba Yogyakarta High School in 1957. He then attended the National Military Academy and was commissioned as an air defense artillery officer after his graduation in 1960. During his military career, Syaukat was assigned to various posts in the air defense artillery command, including as the commander of the 9th Air Defense Battalion in Ngawi and as the assistant for research and development to the air defense command.

Around 1979, Syaukat was posted to the Indonesian embassy in New Delhi as a military attache. During his time in the embassy, he met President Suharto and his wife, Siti Hartinah, during a visit to Sri Lanka. Upon figuring out that Syaukat's wife died of stillbirth, and that he has a two-year-old child, Hartinah rhetorically stated that Syaukat's child was "her child". Syaukat met Suharto again two years later in New Delhi as he was tasked to prepare the embassy for Suharto's visit.

Syaukat returned to Indonesia after serving as military attache. The military secretary to the president at that time, Air Vice Marshal Kardono, was impressed with Syaukat's ability in preparing the embassy during Suharto's visit, and appointed him as the head of the presidential security bureau. He was reassigned to the Army Strategic Reserve Command, where he became the chief of staff with the rank of brigadier general. Several months later, he was promoted to the rank of major general and became the assistant for personnel affairs to the army chief of staff.

== Later career ==
After serving for almost a decade as the military secretary to the president, Kardono nominated Syaukat as his replacement. Suharto approved the nomination, and Syaukat was installed as the military secretary to the president on 14 February 1986. Despite being an active military officer and a public official in the state secretariat, Syaukat's namecard listed his occupation as a painter. He was replaced as military secretary to the president by Brigadier General Pranowo, and he himself was reassigned as the president's inspector general for presidential instruction projects. He then became the secretary general of Indonesia's scouting movement, Gerakan Pramuka Indonesia, from 1998 until 2003, and the chairman of the Trikora Foundation, which gave financial assistance for children whose fathers perished during Operation Trikora.

== Painting and filmmaking ==
Syaukat had been painting since he was in high school. He continued his painting hobby after joining the army and became a professional painter sometime in the late 1980s. He joined the Indonesia Lima painters group, which was a group of five prominent Indonesian painters. The group held art exhibitions in various hotels and art galleries in Jakarta. Syaukat had also designed various items for the government and military, such as the alumni ring for National Military Academy and Indonesian Army Command and General Staff College graduates, emblems for various units inside the Air Defense Artillery Command, the transportation department's Wahana Tata Nugraha trophy in 1992, the sport's department trophy in 1993, and the logo of the National Civil Service Agency in 1994.

Syaukat was also involved in filmmaking and had participated in several films. After his retirement, he became the chairman of the Usmar Ismail Central Film Foundation.

== Death ==
Syaukat died on the morning of 2 July 2023 at the Gatot Soebroto Army Hospital. He was 86.
