= Military Secretary of the President (Indonesia) =

Secretariat of Indonesia President in military field

Military Secretary to the President of the President of Indonesia
- Sekretaris Militer Presiden

- Incumbent; Major General Wahyu Yudhayana since 14 October 2025
- Ministry of the State Secretariat
- Nominator: Minister of State Secretariat
- Appointer: President of Indonesia
- Formation: 1979
- First holder: Kardono
- Website: setneg.go.id

The Military Secretary to the President (Indonesian: Sekretaris Militer Presiden) is a structural official within the Ministry of State Secretariat of the Republic of Indonesia. The position is held by a high-ranking military officer from the Indonesian National Armed Forces or a high-ranking police officer from the Indonesian National Police. The Military Secretary provides technical and administrative support to the President of Indonesia and the Vice President of Indonesia regarding military and police affairs, security coordination, and national honors.

== Functions and Duties ==
The primary responsibilities of the Military Secretariat include:

- Coordinating the security administration for the President, Vice President, and their respective families, which includes overseeing the Presidential Security Force.
- Serving as the main administrative bridge between the President and the TNI as well as Polri.
- Processing the appointment, promotion, and retirement of military and police personnel under the authority of the President.
- Managing the administration of state honors, decorations, and medals awarded by the President in his name as grand master.

== List ==
No.	Name	Term Start	Term End	Rank	Military Branch / Police	President
1	Kardono	1979	22 February 1986	Air Vice Marshal	Indonesian Air Force	Suharto
2	Syaukat Banjaransari	22 February 1986	3 August 1993	Major General	Indonesian Army	Suharto
3	Pranowo	3 August 1993	1995	Major General	Indonesian Army	Suharto
4	Budhy Santoso	1998	2001	Air Vice Marshal	Indonesian Air Force	B. J. Habibie; Abdurrahman Wahid; Megawati Sukarnoputri
10	Hadi Tjahjanto	27 July 2015	8 November 2016	Air Commodore	Indonesian Air Force	Joko Widodo
11	Trisno Hendradi	8 November 2016	9 September 2019	Air Commodore	Indonesian Air Force	Joko Widodo
12	Suharyanto	9 September 2019	11 November 2020	Brigadier General	Indonesian Army	Joko Widodo
13	Mohamad Tony Harjono	11 November 2020	27 June 2022	Air Commodore	Indonesian Air Force	Joko Widodo
14	Hersan	24 August 2022	9 November 2023	Commodore	Indonesian Navy	Joko Widodo
15	Rudy Saladin	7 December 2023	24 July 2024	Major General	Indonesian Army	Joko Widodo
16	Kosasih	November 2024	14 October 2025	Major General	Indonesian Army	Prabowo Subianto
17	Wahyu Yudhayana	14 October 2025	Incumbent	Major General	Indonesian Army	Prabowo Subianto

== See also ==
- Ministry of State Secretariat (Indonesia)
- Presidential Security Force (Indonesia)
- Indonesian National Armed Forces
