= Solo Gang =

Indonesian police and military officers in Surakarta during 2005 to 2012

The Solo Gang (Indonesian: Geng Solo) refers to Indonesian police and military officers active in the city of Surakarta (Solo being the informal name for Surakarta) during the mayoralty of Joko Widodo (2005–2012), who were promoted into high-ranking positions during Widodo's presidency. The term initially referred to police officers but expanded to include military officers. The Solo Gang is noted by observers as Joko Widodo's strategy to consolidate his armed forces and police network, particularly before and after elections.

== Origin and scope ==
The term was coined in 2019 by Neta Pane, the chairman of the Indonesian Police Watch, in response to the appointment of Nana Sudjana as the police chief of Jakarta. Nana was previously the police chief of Surakarta from 2010 to 2011, while Joko Widodo was in his second term as mayor of the city. Neta stated that Nana's appointment as Jakarta's police chief was due to his relationship with Joko Widodo rather than his merits.

The term originally only covered police officers who served as the police chief or deputy police chief in Surakarta during Joko Widodo's mayoral term. However, after several high-ranking appointments of military officers from Surakarta, the term also covered officers who were the military district commander (Komandan Distrik Militer; Dandim) of Surakarta or the commander of the Adi Soemarmo Airbase (Komandan Pangkalan TNI Angkatan Udara Adi Soemarmo; Danlanud Adi Soemarmo) in Surakarta during Joko Widodo's mayoral term. A notable exception to this is Mohamad Tony Harjono, the air force chief of staff who was identified as a member of the Solo Gang, despite serving in Adi Soemarmo only after Joko Widodo had become president.

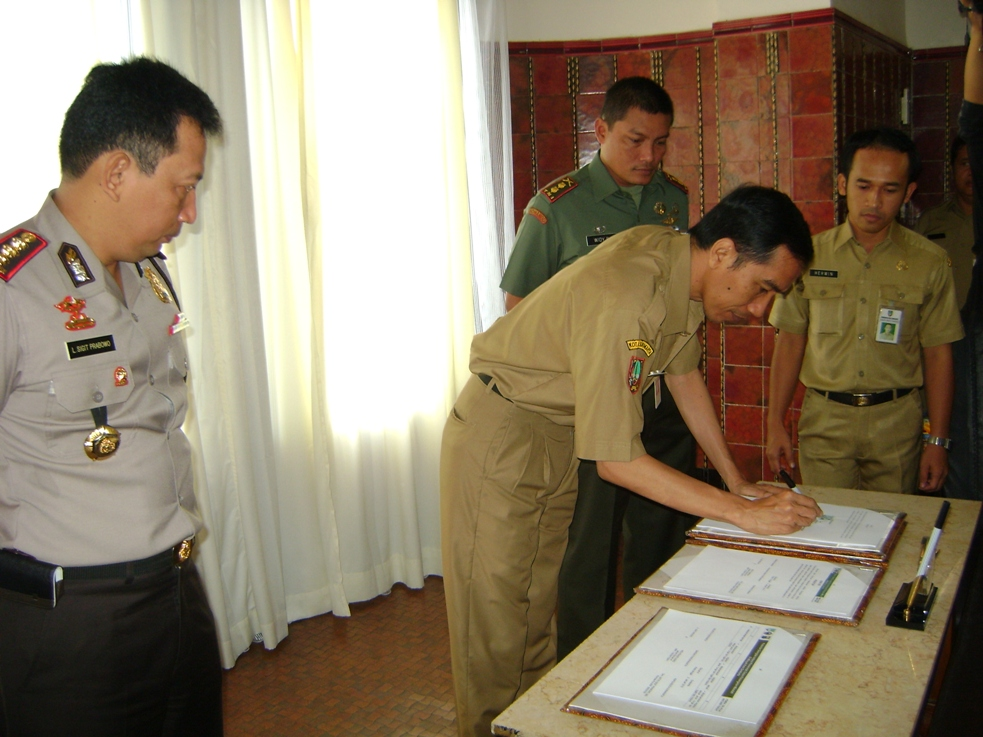
Surakarta police chief Listyo Sigit Prabowo, mayor Joko Widodo, and military district commander Widi Prasetijono signing a document on government agency synchronization in 2012.

== Purpose ==
The gang is utilized by Joko Widodo as his way of consolidating his armed forces and police network before and after elections. Unlike his predecessors, Joko Widodo has never established a strong connection with either the armed forces or the police. Evidence of such consolidation could be seen in 2015 and 2020, shortly after Joko Widodo's victory in the 2014 Indonesian presidential election and 2019 Indonesian general election. He sent two of Solo Gang members, Bakti Agus Fadjari and Agus Subiyanto to become military commanders in West Sumatra and West Java, the two provinces where Joko Widodo had lost significantly in the election.

A similar pattern could be observed nearing the 2024 Indonesian presidential election, in which Joko Widodo's son Gibran Rakabuming Raka ran as vice president. Joko Widodo assigned his Solo Gang's men to positions in Central Java's (the province with the 3rd largest population in Indonesia) government, military, and police. Nana Sudjana and Ahmad Luthfi, who were the police chief and deputy police chief during Joko Widodo's last years in Surakarta, respectively become the acting governor and police chief of Central Java, while Widi Prasetijono, the military district commander of Surakarta from 2011 to 2012, become the commander of the Central Java regional military command. A report by Kumparan nicknamed them as the "three musketeers".

== Identified members ==
=== Police ===
The police chief of Surakarta is held by a police officer with the rank of grand police commissioner (Komisaris Besar Polisi; Kombes Pol). There had been attempts to undermine the bargaining power of the Solo Gang during the tenure of police chief Idham Azis.

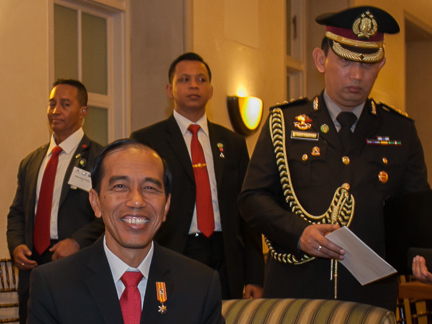
Listyo Sigit Prabowo (right) in 2015 as the aide-de-camp of President Joko Widodo (left).

- Listyo Sigit Prabowo: Listyo was the police chief of Surakarta from 2011 until 2012. At the beginning of Widodo's presidency, Listyo became his aide-de-camp, serving for two years. Afterwards, his career rose quickly, ranging from the police chief of Banten, the chief of profession and security division, and the chief of criminal investigation agency. He was installed as the police chief of Indonesia in December 2021, becoming the youngest police chief since 1966.
- Nana Sudjana: Nana served as Surakarta's police chief in 2010. The term Geng Solo originally rise due to his appointment as Jakarta's police chief in 2019. However, in 2020, he was removed from his position. National police chief Idham Azis stated that the reason was due to failure in controlling the crowds during the arrival of Rizieq Shihab in Indonesia in compliance with COVID-19 protocols. However, analysts suggest that the removal was more likely due to Idham's attempt in promoting his own gang. After his retirement, Nana was appointed as the acting governor of Central Java.
- Lutfi Lubihanto: Luthfi served twice as the police chief of Surakarta, first in early 2005 and second from 2006 until 2008. Like his Solo Gang compatriots, he was quickly promoted after Joko Widodo's presidency, holding the position of the deputy chief of security and intelligence in 2015. In 2016, following the appointment of Tito Karnavian as the national police chief, Widodo attempted to nominate Luthfi as his deputy, but received widespread rejection due to his lack of capacity and seniority. Luthfi was instead appointed as the chief of the police security and intelligence agency, an equivalent three-star post.
- Ahmad Luthfi: Ahmad was the deputy police chief of Surakarta in 2011. A year after Widodo came to power, he was promoted as Surakarta's police chief. He became the police chief of Central Java in 2020 and was the first police officer outside the police academy to hold the post. Neta Pane, the chairman of the Indonesian Police Watch, predicts that Ahmad Luthfi is being prepared by Widodo as the next national police chief. After the end of Widodo's second term, Luthfi successfully ran in the 2024 Central Java gubernatorial election. During the campaign, Widodo actively campaigned for Luthfi.

=== Army ===
The position of the military district commander of Surakarta is held by an army officer with the rank of lieutenant colonel. There are six lieutenant colonels who served as the commander of the Surakarta military district during Joko Widodo's term as mayor. Out of the six officers, five already reached or passed the rank of major general by the end of Joko Widodo's presidential term. A notable exception to this is Sadputro Adi Nugroho, a former Surakarta military district commander who was dishonorably discharged from the military for desertion.

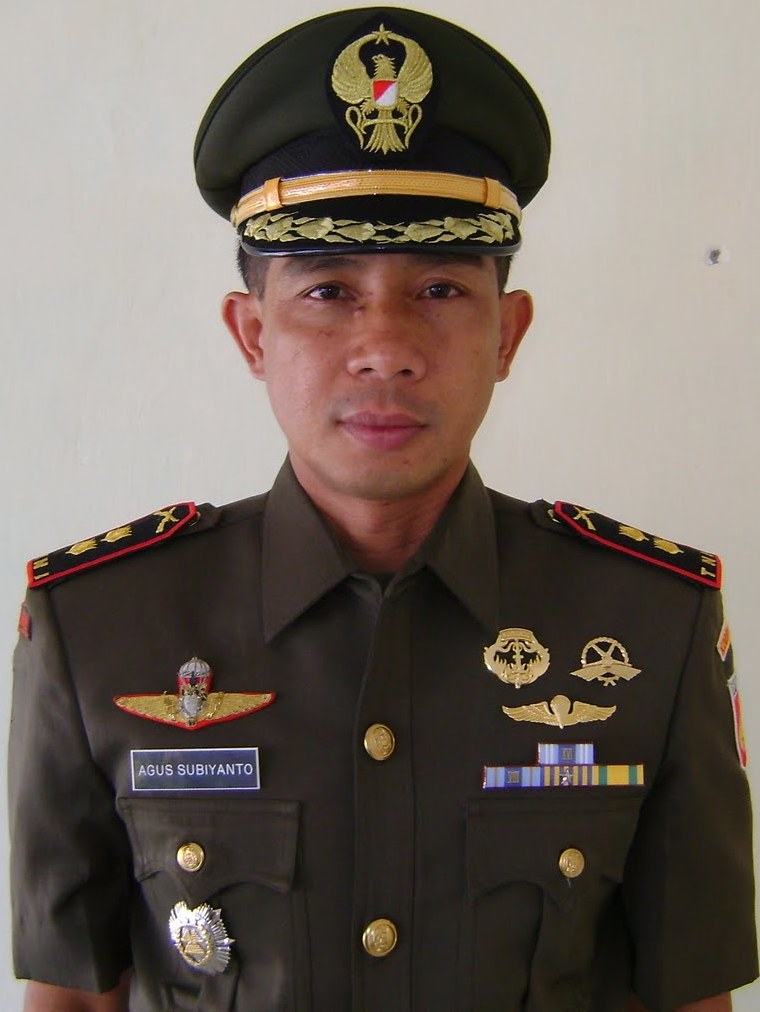
Agus Subiyanto as the Surakarta military district commander, 2009

- Agus Subiyanto: A member of the Kopassus elite force, Agus was Surakarta's military district commander from 2009 to 2011. After Joko Widodo's ascension to presidency, he held prestigious military offices, such as the commander of the Bogor (Suryakancana) Military Region, commander of the Presidential Security Force, and deputy chief of staff of the army. He briefly served as the army chief of staff before becoming the commander of the armed forces since November 2023.
- Widi Prasetijono: Like Agus, Widi was also a member of Kopassus, and the military district commander during the last two years of Joko Widodo's mayoral term (2011–2012). After Joko Widodo became president, he appointed Widi as his aide-de-camp, serving until 2016. He then commanded the Surakarta (Warastrama) Military Area, Central Java (Diponegoro) Military Region, and the commanding-general of Kopassus. By December 2023, he had already become commander of the Army Doctrine, Education and Training Leadership Command and the only lieutenant general in his class of 1993.

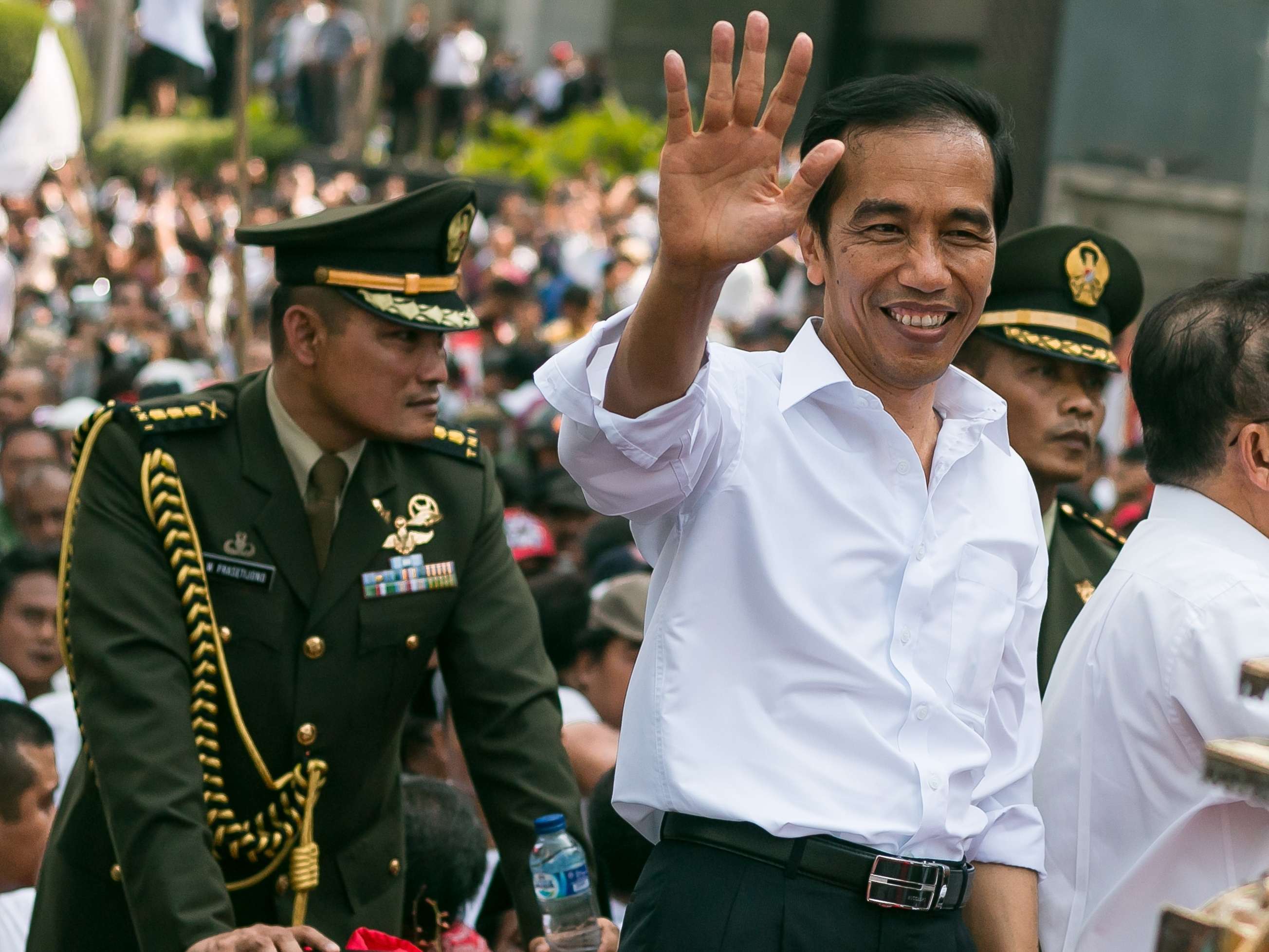
Widi Prasetijono (back), Joko Widodo's aide-de-camp, guarding Widodo (front) in a parade after his first inauguration.

A number of high-ranking military officers were assigned to command the Surakarta (Warastrama) Military Area during Joko Widodo's presidency. These were also identified as members of the Solo Gang. Unlike other military areas in Indonesia which has a brigadier general as its commander, the Surakarta Military Area is commanded by a colonel due to the relative stability of the region. Examples including Maruli Simanjuntak, who become the army chief of staff; Bakti Agus Fadjari, who become the army deputy chief of staff; Deddy Suryadi, who become the commanding-general of Kopassus; Achiruddin and Rafael Granada Baay who become the commander of the Presidential Security Force.

=== Air Force ===
The commander of the Adi Soemarmo airbase is regarded as the air force's representative in Surakarta. The post, allocated for an air force colonel, was largely insignificant, as the airbase is used for training purposes. After Joko Widodo's ascension to power, most of its officeholders started to hold important posts in the air force.

- Hadi Tjahjanto: Hadi forged relations with Joko Widodo during his tenure as the commander of the Adi Soemarmo airbase from 2010 to 2011. After Joko Widodo came into power, Hadi was appointed as Joko Widodo's military secretary, and later as the inspector general of the defense ministry. He then became the air force chief of staff from 2017 to 2018 and the armed forces commander from 2017 to 2021. Upon retirement, he was appointed by Joko Widodo as the minister of agrarian affairs and spatial planning and coordinating minister for political, legal, and security affairs.
- Mohamad Tony Harjono: Harjono was Joko Widodo's aide-de-camp from 2014 until 2016. He was then assigned to command the Adi Soemarmo airbase from 2016 to 2018, before becoming the air force chief of staff in 2024.

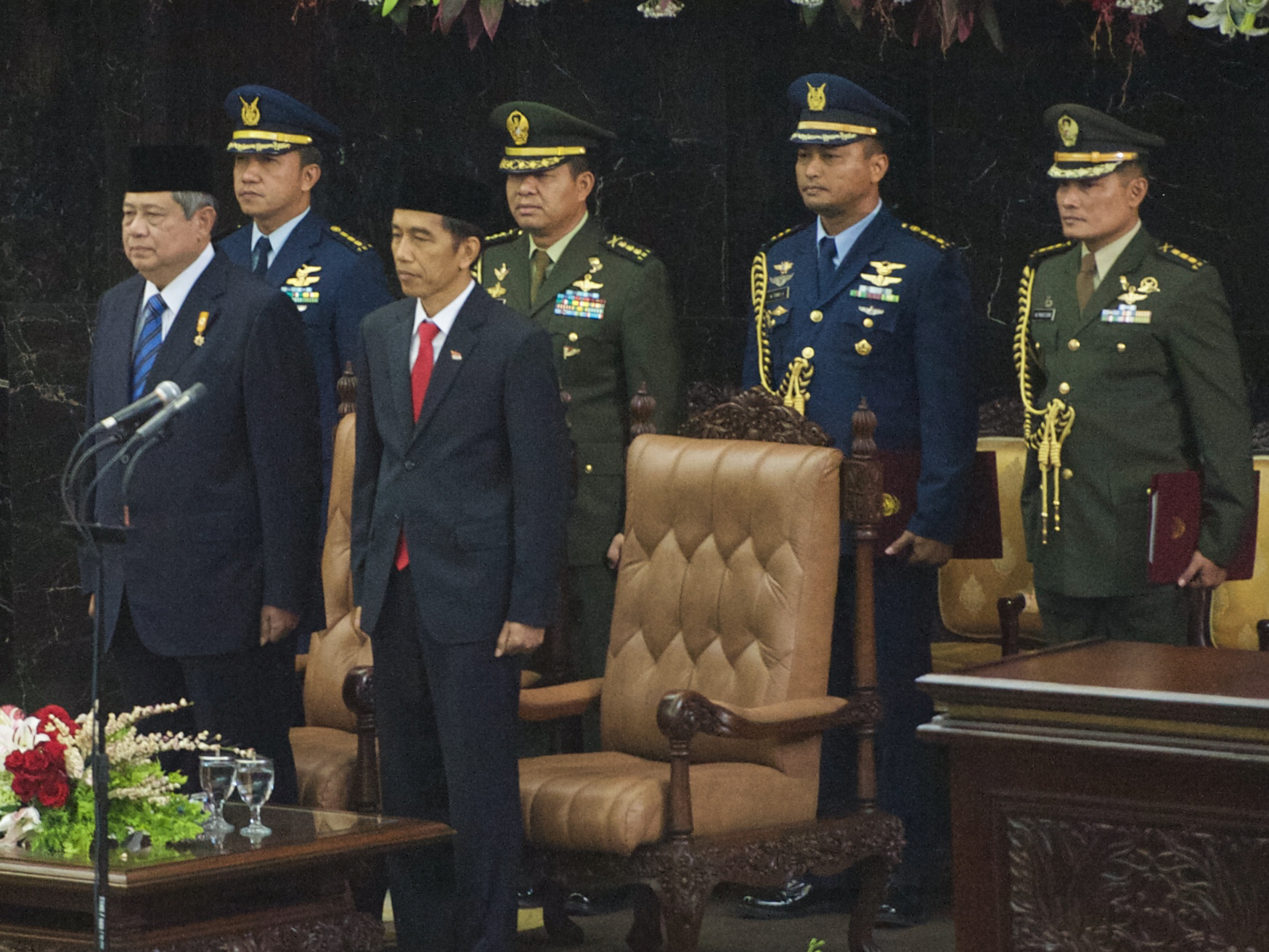
President-elect of Indonesia, Joko Widodo, and the outgoing president Susilo Bambang Yudhoyono, at Widodo's inauguration in 2014. Widi Prasetijono and Mohamad Tony Harjono could be seen standing behind Joko Widodo.

== Other gangs ==
Aside from the Solo Gang, Neta Pane also mentioned the existence of other gangs that exists during the bid for the national police chief. The Pejaten Gang includes police generals who are close to national intelligence chief Budi Gunawan (Pejaten referring to the location of Budi's office as national intelligence chief), while the Makassar Gang refers to police generals who originated from Makassar in Sulawesi and has relations with national police chief Idham Azis, deputy national police chief Syafruddin Kambo, or vice president Jusuf Kalla. Neta also distinguished the non-affiliated police generals as the Independent Gang.

== Response ==
Multiple government officials have denied the existence of the Solo Gang. Presidential chief of staff Moeldoko refuted allegations regarding the existence Solo Gang and emphasized that appointments made by Joko Widodo were based on talent scouting rather than personal affiliations. In response to the appointment of Nana Sudjana, police spokesperson M. Iqbal denied the Solo Gang claims, stating that the police has its own mechanism for appointments. NasDem Party MP Ahmad Sahroni stated that the allegations that Solo Gang members were placed in strategic positions is unfounded.

== See also ==
- Rolex 12 - a similar group from the Philippines
