= Yuyu Sutisna =

Indonesian Air Force officer

Air Chief Marshal (Ret.) His Excellency Yuyu Sutisna
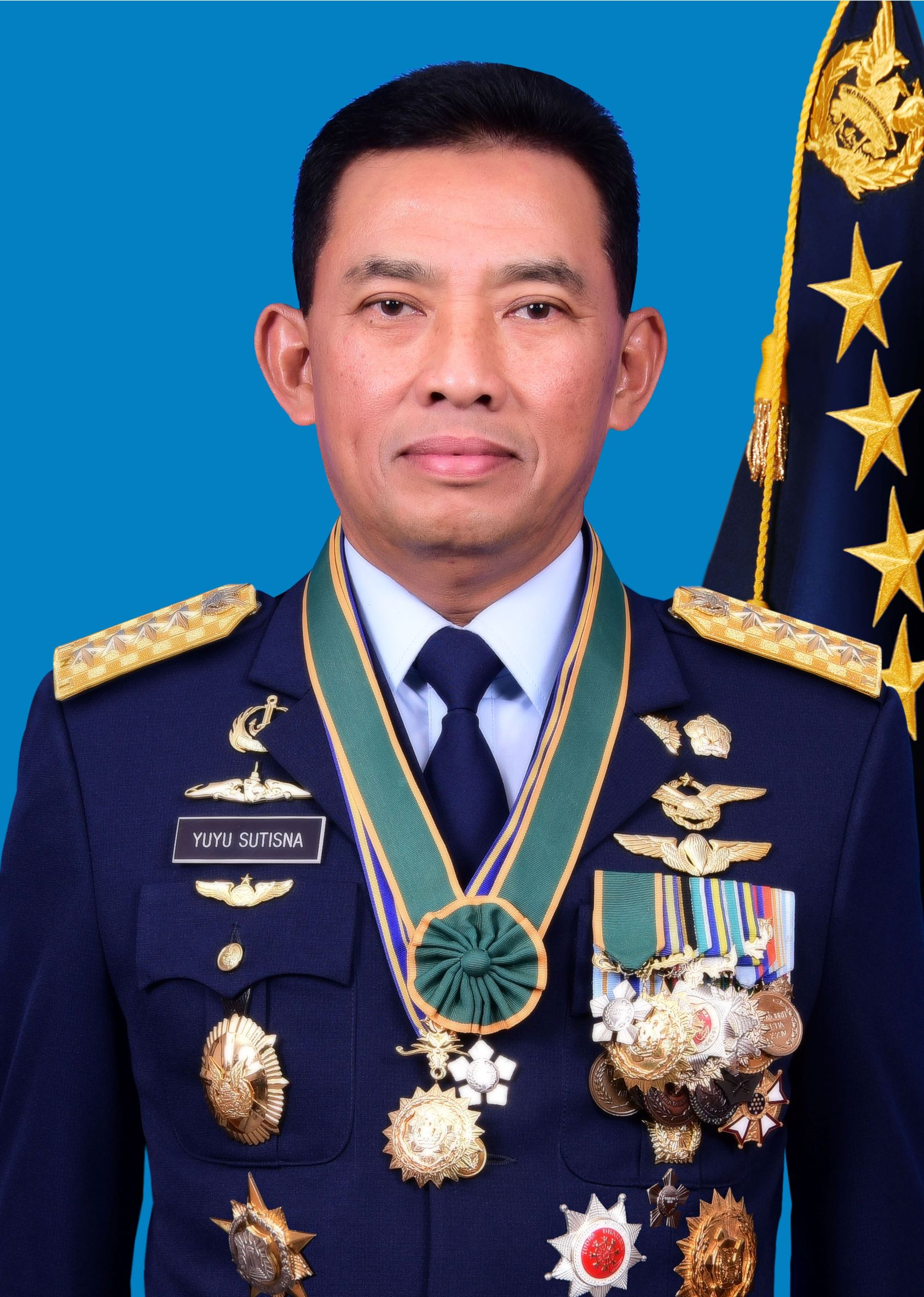

Ambassador of Indonesia to the Kingdom of Morocco
- Incumbent
- Assumed office 24 March 2025
- President: Prabowo Subianto
- Preceded by: Hasrul Azwar

Chief of Staff of the Indonesian Air Force
- In office 17 January 2018 – 20 May 2020
- Deputy: Himself (2018), Wieko Syofyan (2018-2019), Fahru Zaini (2019-2020)
- Preceded by: Hadi Tjahjanto
- Succeeded by: Fadjar Prasetyo

18th Vice Chief of Staff of the Indonesian Air Force
- In office 27 Oktober 2017 – 2 Maret 2018
- Chief of Staff: Hadi Tjahjanto (2017–18); Himself (2018)
- Preceded by: Hadiyan Sumintaatmadja
- Succeeded by: Wieko Syofyan

Personal details
- Born: 10 June 1962 (age 64) Bandung Regency, West Java, Indonesia

Military service
- Allegiance: Indonesia
- Branch/service: Indonesian Air Force
- Years of service: 1986–2020
- Rank: Air chief marshal
- Commands: Chief of Staff of the Indonesian Air Force

Air Chief Marshal (Ret.) Yuyu Sutisna (born 10 June 1962) is a retired air chief marshal who was the 27th Chief of Staff of the Indonesian Air Force, and currently serves as Indonesian Ambassador to Morocco. Previously, he had served as deputy chief of staff, in addition to commander of the 1st Air Force Operational Command and the national air defense forces command.

== Early life ==
Yuyu Sutisna was born on 10 June 1962 at a village in Cicalengka district, in Bandung Regency. His family previously lived in Bandung City proper, but was evicted from their home. Yuyu's father was a mechanic.

== Military career ==
Yuyu graduated from the Indonesian Air Force Academy by 1986 and pursued a career at the Iswahyudi Air Force Base where he flew an F-5 Tiger. He eventually became the base's commander in 2012. As a pilot, he managed to get total of 4,250 flying hours, 2,000 of which are with an F-5 Tiger.

He later also was appointed to a position within Air Force HQ, becoming an advisor to the Chief of Staff in 2015. On 5 January 2016, he was appointed the 25th commander of 1st air force operational command. A year later, he was appointed commander of the national air defense forces command. By the end of 2017, he was appointed deputy chief of staff of the air force.

=== Air Force Chief of Staff ===
Upon the elevation of Hadi Tjahjanto as Commander of the Indonesian National Armed Forces, Yuyu was appointed to replace him on 16 January 2018, after having the position vacant for over a month. Along with the post, he was promoted to air chief marshal.

He stated that acquiring Sukhoi Su-35 fighters would be a top priority in his term, and planned to finalize a contract by the end of January 2018. The contract was signed in February, with the Indonesian government placing orders for 11 SU-35s worth $1.14 billion. His term as chief of staff ended 20 May 2020, followed by his retirement from the armed forces in June 2020.

== Diplomatic career ==
On 24 March 2025, Yuyu was appointed Ambassador of Indonesia to Morocco. He presented copies of his credentials to Minister of Foreign Affairs, African Cooperation and Moroccan Expatriates Nasser Bourita on 24 June 2025. He officially began his duties with a presentation of credentials to king Mohammed VI of Morocco on 14 May 2026 and to president Mohamed Ould Ghazouani of Mauritania on 21 May 2026.

Military offices
Preceded by Hadi Tjahjanto	Chief of Staff of Indonesian Air Force; 2018–2020	Succeeded by Fadjar Prasetyo
