= Mohamad Tony Harjono =

24th Indonesian air force chief of staff from 2024

Air Chief Marshal Mohamad Tony Harjono
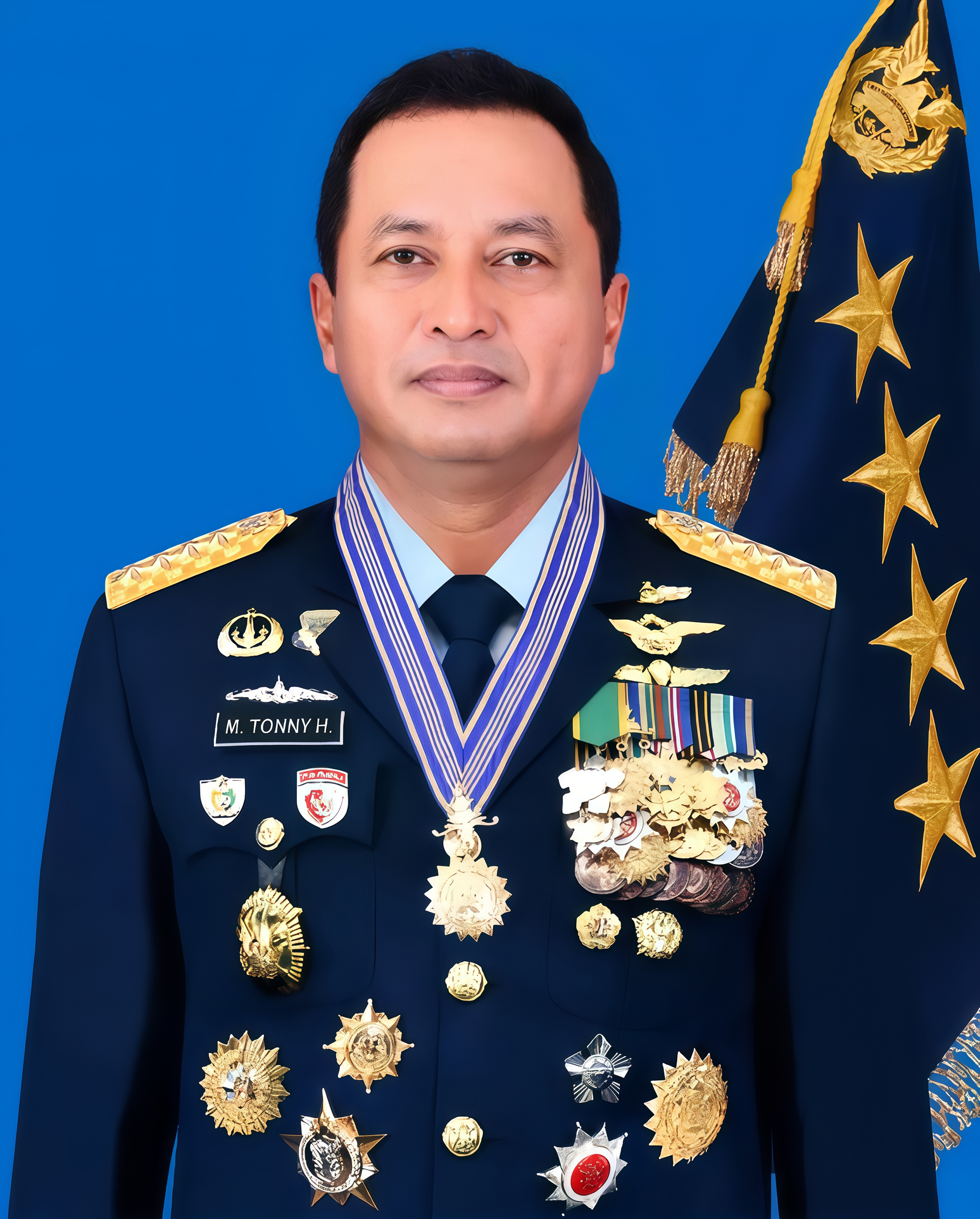

Chief of Staff of the Indonesian Air Force
- Incumbent
- Assumed office 5 April 2024
- President: Joko Widodo; Prabowo Subianto
- Preceded by: ACM Fadjar Prasetyo

Commander of Joint Territorial Defense Commands II
- In office 17 November 2023 – 5 April 2024
- Preceded by: AM Andyawan Martono Putra
- Succeeded by: AM M. Khairil Lubis

Commander of National Air Operations Command
- In office 4 November 2022 – 17 November 2023
- Preceded by: AM Andyawan Martono Putra
- Succeeded by: AM Tedi Rizalihadi

Personal details
- Born: 4 October 1971 (age 55) Jakarta, Indonesia
- Education: Indonesian Air Force Academy; Gajayana University
- Nickname: "Racoon"

Military service
- Allegiance: Indonesia
- Branch/service: Indonesian Air Force
- Years of service: 1993–present
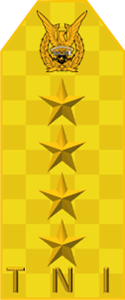
- Rank: Air Chief Marshall
- Commands: Air Force Doctrine, Education and Training Development Command; Halim Perdanakusuma Airbase; Adisumarmo Airbase; Timika Airbase; 11th Air Squadron
- Battles/wars: Papua conflict; 2003–2004 Indonesian offensive in Aceh; 2003 Bawean incident

Air Chief Marshal Mohamad Tonny Harjono (born 4 October 1971) is an Indonesian air force officer who became the 24th air force chief of staff, serving since 5 April 2024. He graduated from the air force academy in 1992 and commanded several airbases and regional commands before being entrusted to lead the air force. He was a confidant of President Joko Widodo, having served as his aide-de-camp from 2014 until 2016 and military secretary from 2020 until 2022. Military observers identified him as part of the Solo Gang, a group of military and police officers whose career rose swiftly after serving in Surakarta, the hometown of Joko Widodo.

== Military career ==
=== Fighter pilot and instructor ===
Harjono was born on 4 October 1971 in Jakarta. Harjono began his service upon graduating from the air force academy in 1993. He started his career as a flight officer in the 3rd squadron, headquartered in the Iswahjudi Air Force Base. His career gradually rose in the squadron and consequently became the chief of navigation and chief of personnel.

Harjono attended the air force's aviator school in 1996 and a course on flying the F-16 Fighting Falcon fighter jet the next year. He was assigned to the Adisumarmo Airbase as flight instructor. Harjono received certification to flew the KAI KT-1 Woongbi turboprop in 2005 and the Sukhoi Su-27 in 2008. He was given the callsign Racoon.

Harjono graduated from the Air Force Command School in 2002 and returned to the 3rd Squadron as a fighter pilot. On 3 July 2003, the squadron was detached by the National Air Defence Command in a standoff against the US Navy F-18 Hornets over Bawean Island. Harjono, who was a captain at that time, piloted one of the two F-16s deployed in the standoff.

=== Squadron, airbase commander, and aide-de-camp ===
Harjono's career in the airforce began to rose quickly after the incident. He was assigned to the Hasanuddin Airbase in Makassar, where he became the chief of operations and the commander of the 11th squadron. He was briefly sent to Timika in Central Papua as the commander of the local airbase before returning to Makassar as wing commander.

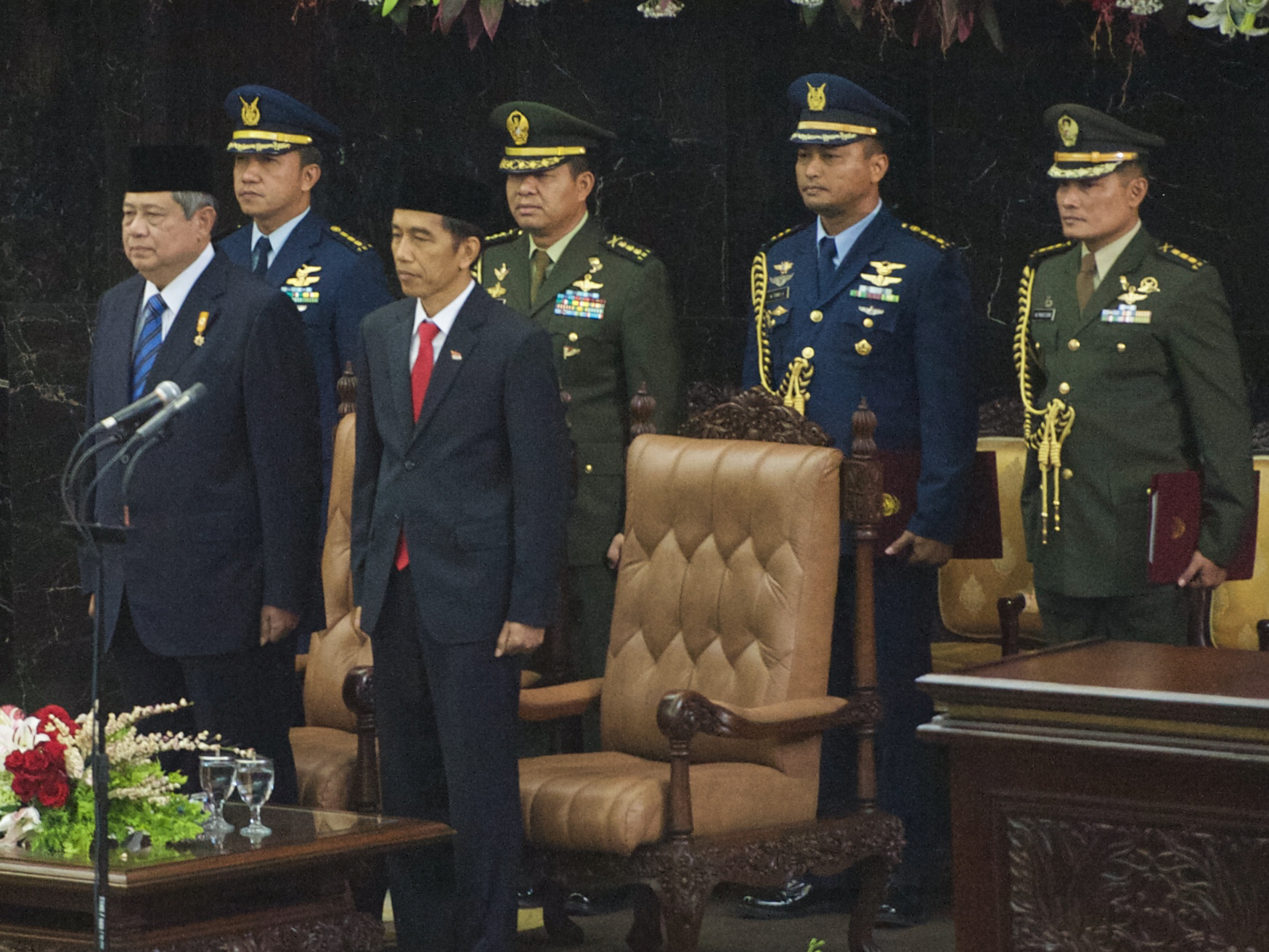
President-elect of Indonesia, Joko Widodo, and the outgoing president Susilo Bambang Yudhoyono, at Widodo's inauguration in 2014. Harjono could be seen standing behind second from the right.

At the end of his tenure as wing commander in 2014, Harjono was selected by president-elect at that time, Joko Widodo, as his aide-de-camp from the air force until 2016. Afterwards, in October 2016 he was sent to command the Adisumarmo Airbase in Surakarta, Joko Widodo's hometown, making him part of the Solo Gang.

During his tenure as airbase commander, an incident occurred in which an air force training aircraft skidded off the runway. Both the instructor and the pilot were unharmed, and Harjono later clarified that the aircraft suffered minor damage.

Aside from his daily duty in Surakarta, Harjono also studied management at the nearby Gajayana University in Malang. He received a degree in 2018.

After less than two years serving as the commander of the Adisumarmo Airbase, in February 2018 Harjono was assigned to command the Halim Perdanakusumah Airbase, the air force's largest airbase. Harjono was installed on 26 February 2018 and received a promotion to the rank of first air marshal (air commodore) on 8 April. Harjono issued a call for residents nearby to stop flying balloons in order to prevent flight accidents. He also oversaw the opening of the Halim Park for the public in 2019.

=== Military secretary and commander ===
Harjono as military secretary accompanying Coordinating Minister for Political, Legal, and Security Affairs Mahfud MD announcing new national heroes in 2021.

Harjono received his second star shortly after being appointed Joko Widodo's military secretary. He was installed for the position on 11 November 2020 and was promoted to air vice-marshal a week later. In April 2022, Harjono was appointed the commissioner for the Pelita Air Service company, representing the air force interests.

Less than two years later, on 13 July 2022, Harjono became the Commander of the Air Force Doctrine, Education and Training Leadership Command, and received his third star as air marshal on 29 July. Harjono continued to held the position of military secretary until 24 August.

Harjono's stint in the Air Force Doctrine, Education and Training Leadership Command lasted for less than six months, as on 6 December 2022 he became the commander of the newly-formed National Air Operations Command. A year later, on 13 December 2023, Harjono was made as the Commander of the Second Joint Territorial Defense Command. On both occasions, Harjono replaced Andyawan Martono Putra, who was five years more senior than him.

== Chief of Staff of the Air Force ==
Newsreel from Antara on Harjono's inauguration as the air force chief of staff.

As early as December 2022, Harjono had already been projected to become the air force chief of staff, as he was the only three-star marshal in his class of 1993. In March 2024, as air force chief of staff Fadjar Prasetyo was nearing his retirement age, three names became the main candidates to replace him. Harjono, Samsul Rizal (Commander of the Armed Force Command and Staff College), and Tedi Rizalhadi (Commander of the Second Joint Territorial Defense Command), were all nominees to the position. Andyawan, the-then deputy chief of staff of the air force, was not nominated, as he was also nearing his retirement age. Out of all the candidates, Tonny was the most junior and longest to retire, having five years and seven months of active service before entering retirement. Tonny's previous position as Joko Widodo's aide-de-camp and military secretary made him the strongest candidate out of them all. Harjono was eventually confirmed as the new chief of staff through a presidential decree on 25 March 2024.

Harjono was installed as the new air force chief of staff on 5 April 2024 at the state place by President Joko Widodo. He was promoted on the same occasion as a four-start air chief marshal. A handover ceremony from Fadjar to Harjono was held at the Halim Perdanakusumah Airbase on the same day, attended by cabinet and air force officials. Several hundred air force soldiers were deployed for the handover ceremony, including a flypast of six F-16s in the midst of flag passing ceremony. On his inauguration speech, armed forces commander General Agus Subiyanto urged the air force to adapt in light of the upcoming new planes. Coordinating Minister for Politics, Law, and Security Hadi Tjahjanto encouraged Harjono to continue Fadjar's program, ensure that defense equipment functions well, secure airspace and borders, and prepare weather modification technology to anticipate forest and land fires. Harjono stated his readiness to lead the air force despite the seniority of most of his subordinates, such as his deputy, Andyawan.

Harjono was endorsed by politicians inside the People's Representative Council. MP Bobby Rizaldi stated that Harjono was the most feasible candidate for the air force chief of staff due to his age and experience with the president. Another MP, TB Hasanuddin, stated his support for Harjono's appointment due to his good track record. Meutya Hafid, the chairman of the first commission—handling armed forces—inside the People's Representative Council, expressed her support for Harjono's nomination due to his experience in handling various aerial problems.

== Personal life ==
Harjono is married to Isa Apriliani and has two children.

Shortly after Harjono's confirmation as the air force chief of staff, the secretary general of the Indonesian Democratic Party of Struggle Hasto Kristiyanto stated that Harjono was related to first lady Iriana Widodo. A hoax later spread on Facebook that Harjono was the brother-in-law of Iriana. Independent investigation later disproved this claim, showing that Harjono was related neither to Joko Widodo nor Iriana.

== Dates of rank ==
Air commodore	8 April 2018
Air vice-marshal	18 November 2020
Air marshal	29 July 2022
Air chief marshal	5 April 2024

Military offices
Preceded by Fadjar Prasetyo	Chief of Staff of Indonesian Air Force; 2024–present	Incumbent
