= Indonesian Army Women's Corps =

Indonesian Army Women's Corps (Kowad)
- Korps Wanita Angkatan Darat; KOWAD
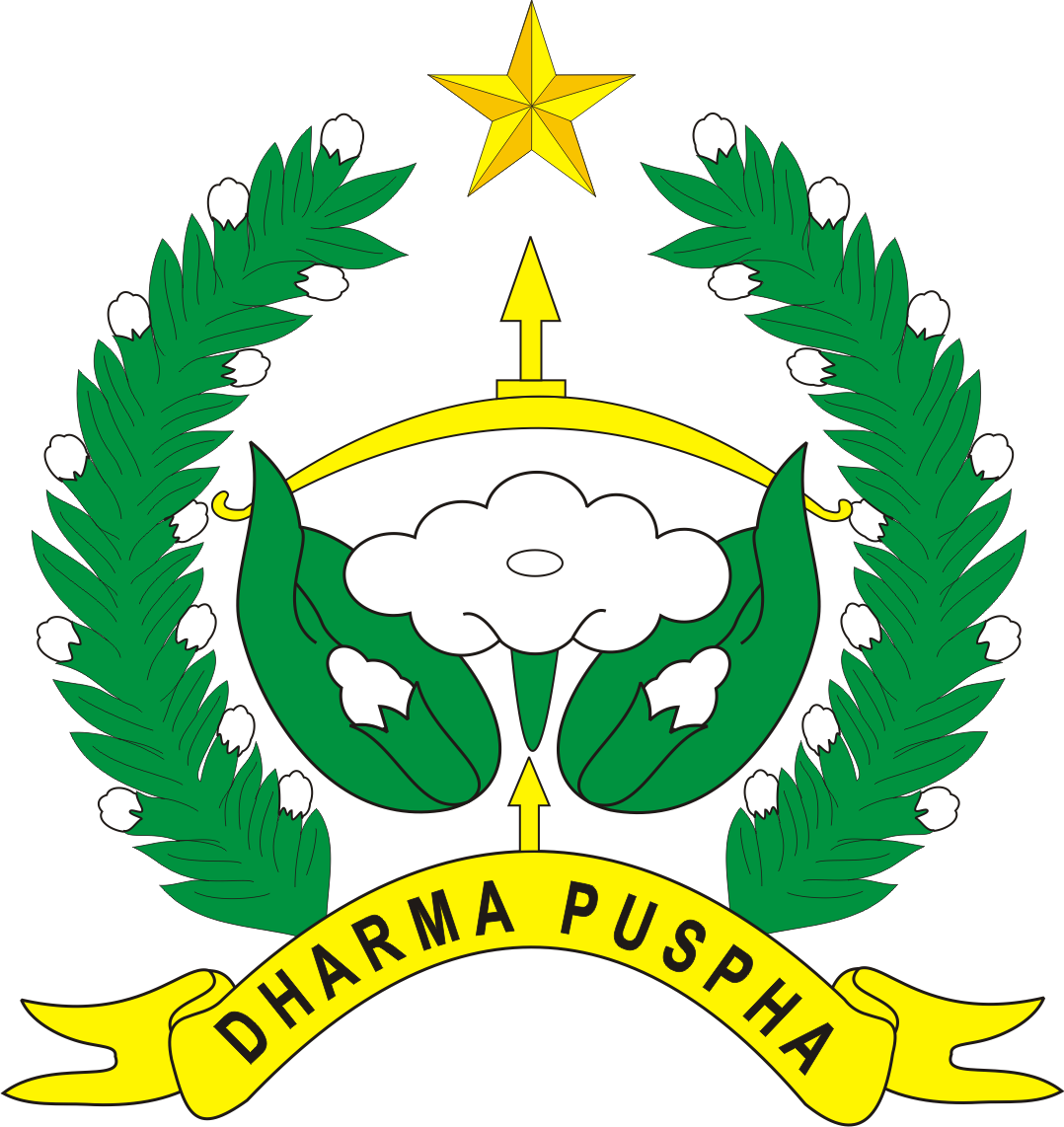
- Indonesian Army Women's Corps insignia
- Founded: 22 December 1961
- Country: Indonesia
- Branch: Indonesian Army
- Motto(s): Dharma Puspha ("Flowers of service")
- March: Mars Kowad
- Website: tniad.mil.id

The Army Women's Corps (Kowad) is the official administrative formation of women in active service in the combat, combat support and service support formations of the Indonesian Army.

== Brief history ==
In 1959, with Sukarno's guided democracy policies now in force, the National Armed Forces considered making a historic decision to finally enlist women to serve in its ranks. For many years before, during and after the Indonesian National Revolution, many women fought as either individual rebels or as part of rebel formations that fought for Indonesia's independence from the rule of the Dutch and many women had even made societal advances for various causes, including feminism and the economic and social scene. The rights of women were one of the many rights fought for by the pioneer generations of Indonesian nationalists. For these reasons and others, Colonel Dr. Sumarno, then assistant chief of staff of personnel of the Indonesian Army, conveyed his ideas of the service of women for certain fields of assignment that required precision, perseverance, patience, and maternal qualities that became the nature of women to better achieve organizational affiliation within the ranks of the regular Army and in the reserves. On 21 December 1960, by virtue of General Orders No.1056/12/1960 by the Commander of the National Armed Forces and Minister of Defense, General Abdul Haris Nasution, who was also then concurrently the chief of staff of the Army, the Women's Army Corps was officially created as a specialty arm of the Army for the volunteer service of women in military service as officers, warrant officers, non-commissioned officers and enlisted servicewomen, making Indonesia one of the first Southeast Asian countries to admit women for volunteer military service in the military.

Because December 22, 1938, the date now held as Mother's Day, was the day of the First Women's Congress that was held in Indonesian territory (then the Netherlands East Indies) in 1938, it was later designated as the official Corps Day, honoring the military mothers and women who through their works and actions not just ensured the independence and sovereignty of the Republic against foreign aggression, but also contributed to her defense, stability, progress and prosperity in all works of endeavor regardless of their religion, ethnic origin and way of life, including as servicewomen in the ranks of the Army.

The following year, the Women's Army Corps Training School was opened under the auspices of the Indonesian Army Doctrine, Education and Training Development Command to train directly recruited members of this corps from other arms and specialities of the Army.

On October 5, 1963, the KOWAD made its first public appearance as part of the Indonesian National Armed Forces Day celebrations held at the Gelora Bung Karno Sports Complex grounds. Many of the first ever women to march past in a national parade were veterans of the recently concluded Operation Trikora, wherein personnel of the Corps were deployed as part of the combat and service support units forward deployed to West Papua to fight against the Armed forces of the Netherlands. To this day, the presence of the Women's Army Corps in major ceremonies of the armed forces, including on Army Day, December 15, has indeed been positive among the general public, given the government's efforts to ensure that the Indonesian woman's role in national defense will be always maintained.

Beginning 2017, alongside graduates of the Career Officer Candidate School (Sepa PK), KOWAD has also included combat and combat/service support graduates from the Indonesian Military Academy.

== Organization ==
While being a personnel Corps of the Indonesian Army, unlike other corps and specialities, it is an administrative formation that is responsible for the service of women in active duty service in the Army's combat, combat support and service support formations and since the 2021 formation of the Reserve Component, responsible for the training and specialization work of Indonesian Army lady reservists, in both cases composed of servicewomen coming from all provinces, ethnic communities, races and religions of Indonesia.

The INA-WAC is organized on similar lines as the other corps and specialities of the Army with different recruiting standards for women planning to join this senior branch of the National Armed Forces. However, given its role as the administrative corps responsible for women's affairs, its personnel come from these other corps and specialties and wear crusher caps and the distinctive colored beret of their current reporting specialty. Its Director General, usually ranking brigadier general, is appointed and relieved from her position by order of the Chief of Staff of the Army.
