= Indonesian Army Doctrine, Education and Training Development Command =

Army Doctrine, Education and Training Development Command
- Komando Pembinaan Doktrin, Pendidikan dan Latihan TNI AD
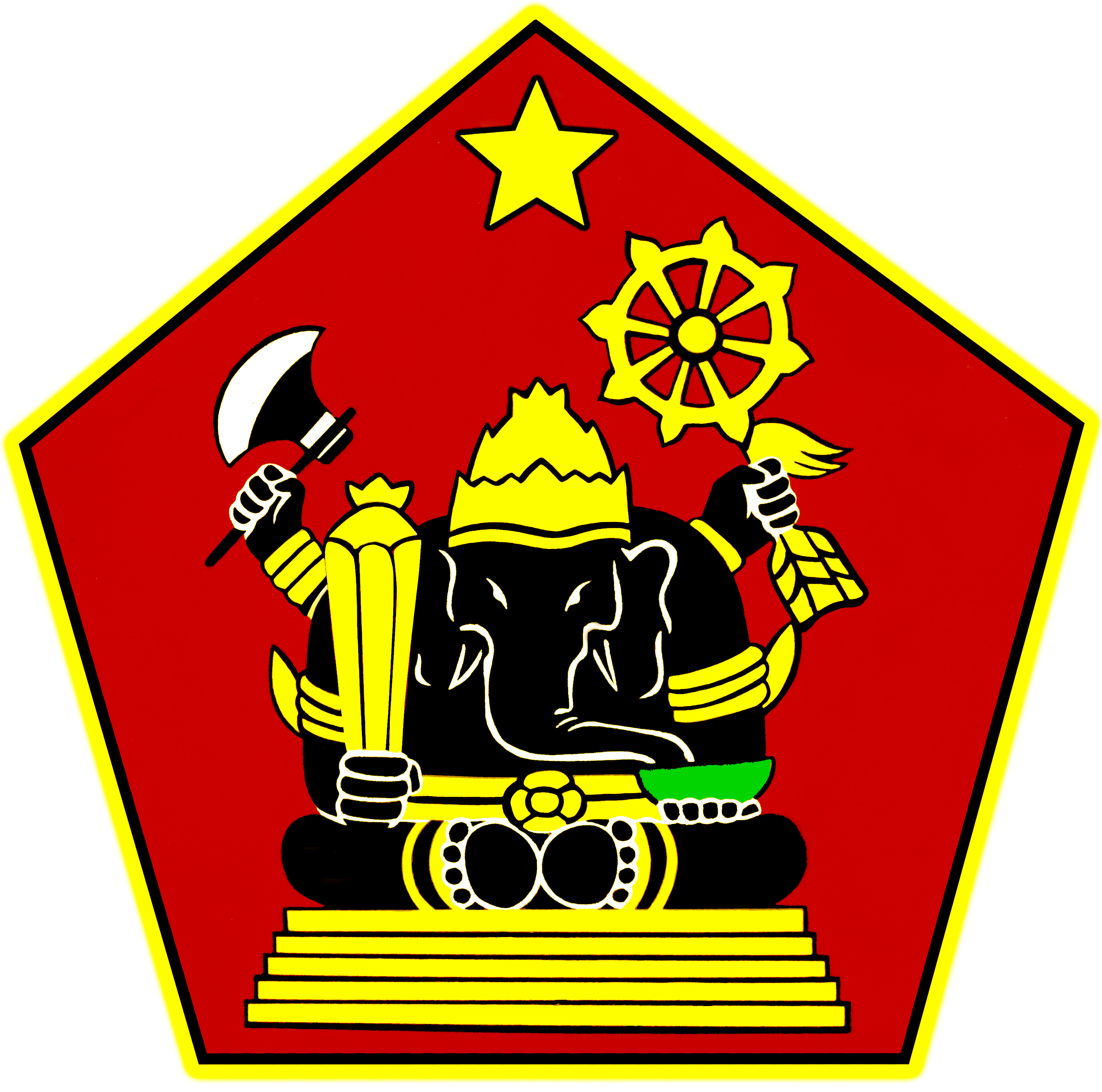
- Founded: December 10, 1994
- Country: Indonesia
- Branch: Indonesian Army
- Type: Training command
- Part of: Indonesian National Army
- Nickname: Kodiklatad
- Website: kodiklat-tniad.mil.id

Commanders
- Commander: Lieutenant General TNI Widi Prasetijono
- Deputy Commander: Major General TNI Kunto Arief Wibowo
- Inspector: Major General TNI Tjaturputra Gunadi Genah

Indonesian Army Doctrine, Education and Training Development Command (Indonesian: Komando Pembinaan Doktrin, Pendidikan dan Latihan TNI AD or Kodiklat TNI-AD) is an Indonesian Army Principal Command which is directly under the office of the Chief of Staff of the Army and located in Bandung, West Java. Its principal responsibility is the training of all service personnel of the Army to fulfill its primary responsibilities of national defense and civil-military cooperation in national development.

== Kodiklatad Task ==
The main task of the Kodiklat is to provide guidance on the doctrine / system of terrestrial dimension operations, education and training of the TNI AD. To carry out these basic tasks, Kodiklat is empowered to:

1. Doctrine formation: Includes all work efforts and activities in the field of research and development of the Army Doctrine and the operational standards of the Army
2. Educational training: Includes all business work and activities in the field of research and development of the military education system, organizing education except Educational activities in Seskoad, Akmil, Secapa, Pusdikpasus, Rindam, Instek and Akper as well as all educational work in the centers run by the command or are under nominal supervision of it
3. Training development: Includes all business and work activities in the field of research and development of the TNI AD training system, organizing exercises in national, regional and local levels to ensure the preparedness of army personnel for the performance of their duties in national defense, civil-military cooperation and civil disaster relief

== History ==
The founding of the Kodiklat began with the establishment of the Infantry Directorate in 1950. Then in 1951, it was changed to the Army Education Directorate, abbreviated as DPAD. Then in 1956, it was inaugurated as Inspectorate General of Education and Training which was perfected into KOPLAT. As the reorganization within the ABRI body was merged and formed into KOBANGDIKLAT, which was subsequently divided into two commands, PUSBANGSISOPS and PUSBINDIK. PUSBANGSISOPS and PUSBINDIK are considered to be more effective if they are coordinated into one Unit so that through the Kasad Skep Number Skep / 454 / XI / 1994 dated November 17, 1994, the two formations were merged into the current Kodiklatad.

== Directly reporting institutions ==
The following institutions are operated under direct supervision of the Kodiklatad:

- Combat Operations Training Centre (Pusat Latihan Tempur TNI AD (Puslatpur TNI AD)) located in Baturaja
- Combat Simulation Centre (Pusat Simulasi Tempur TNI AD (Pussimpur TNI AD)) located in Bandung
- Army Branch Training Schools (Pusdik Kecabangan):
  - Infantry Training School (Pusat Pendidikan Infanteri (Pusdikif)) in Bandung
  - Cavalry Training School (Pusat Pendidikan Kavaleri (Pusdikkav)) in Padalarang
  - Air Defense Artillery Training School (Pusat Pendidikan Artileri Pertahanan Udara (Pusdikarhanud)) in Malang, East Java
  - Field Artillery Training School (Pusat Pendidikan Artileri Medan (Pusdikarmed)) in Cimahi
  - Women's Army Corps Training School (Pusat Pendidikan Korps Wanita TNI AD (Pusdikkowad)) in Lembang
  - Finance Corps Training School (Pusat Pendidikan Keuangan (Pusdikku)) in Bandung
  - Physical Fitness and Sports Training School (Pusat Pendidikan Jasmani (Pusdikjas)) in Cimahi
  - Military Police Corps Training School (Pusat Pendidikan Polisi Militer (Pusdikpom)) in Cimahi
  - Army Signals Corps Training School (Pusat Pendidikan Perhubungan (Pusdikhub)) in Cimahi
  - Territorial Defence Training School (Pusat Pendidikan Teritorial (Pusdikter)) in Bandung
  - Logistics and Transportation Training School (Pusat Pendidikan Pembekalan Angkutan (Pusdikbekang)) in Cimahi
  - Ordnance Corps Training School (Pusat Pendidikan Peralatan (Pusdikpal)) in Cimahi
  - Topography Training School (Pusat Pendidikan Topografi (Pusdiktop)) in Bandung
  - Corps of Engineers Training School (Pusat Pendidikan Zeni (Pusdikzi)) in Bogor
  - Army Medical School (Pusat Pendidikan Kesehatan (Pusdikkes)) in Jakarta
  - Intelligence Training School (Pusat Pendidikan Intelijen (Pusdikintel)) in Bogor
  - Adjudant General's Corps Training School (Pusat Pendidikan Ajudan Jenderal (Pusdikajen)) in Lembang
  - Army Justice Corps Training School (Pusat Pendidikan Hukum (Pusdikkum)) in Jakarta
  - General Military Training School (Pusat Pendidikan Pengetahuan Militer Umum (Pusdikpengmilum)) in Cimahi
  - Army Aviation Training School (Pusat Pendidikan Penerbang Angkatan Darat (Pusdikpenerbad)) in Semarang
  - Army Scientific and Technological Application Review Agency (Lembaga Pengkajian Teknologi/STTAD (Lemjiantek)) in Bandung
  - Indonesian Army Polytechnic (Politeknik Angkatan Darat (Poltekad)) in Malang
  - Regional Training Regiments (Resimen Induk Daerah Militer (Rindam)) assigned to all 27 Military Regional Commands of the Army
