= 1st Army Area =

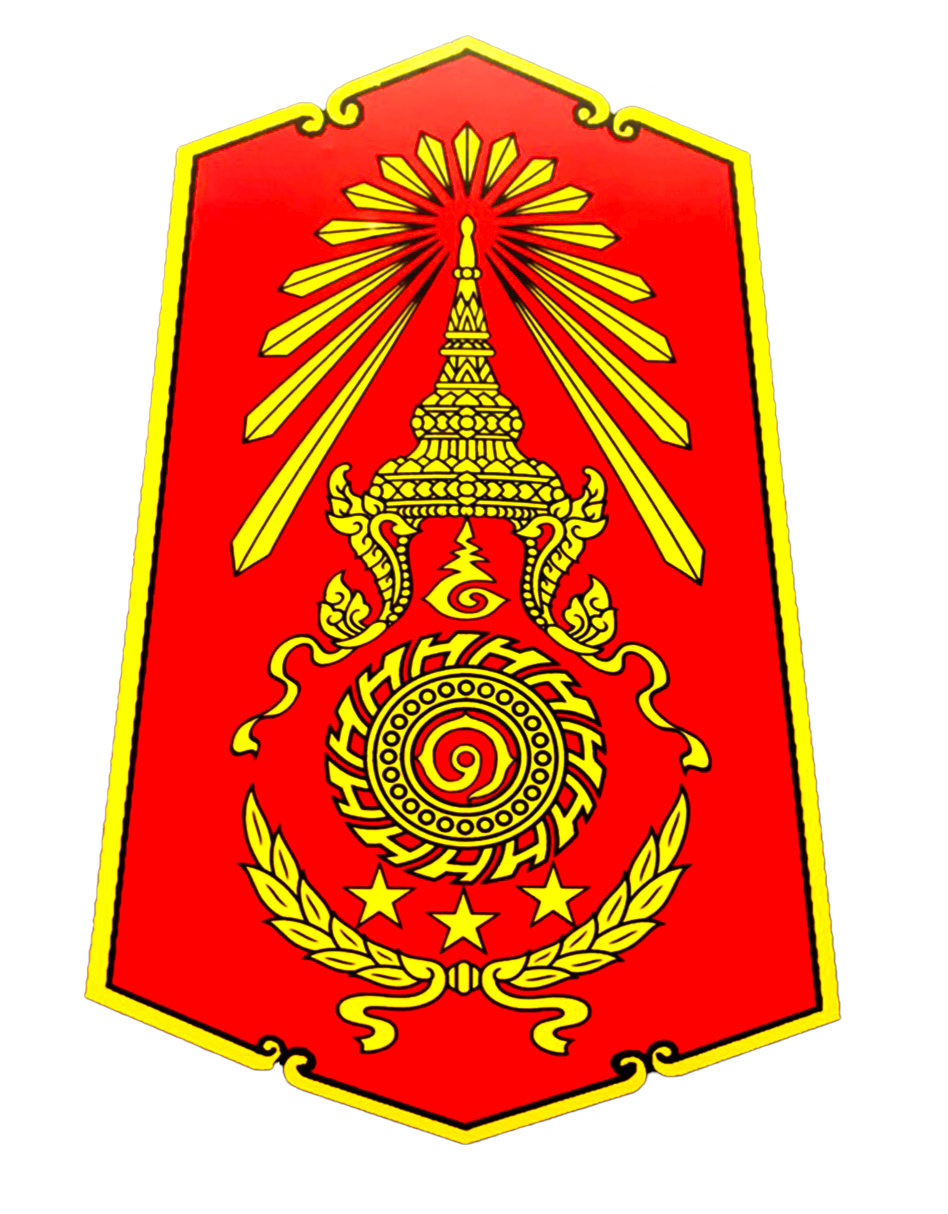
- Emblem of the 1st Army Area
- Founded: January 13, 1910; 116 years ago (as the 1st Army)
- Country: Thailand
- Allegiance: King of Thailand
- Branch: Royal Thai Army
- Size: Military district
- Part of: Royal Thai Army
- Garrison/HQ: Ratchadamnoen Nok Road Dusit subdistrict Dusit district Bangkok 10300
- Anniversaries: 13 January
- Engagements: World War II; Franco-Thai War; Pacific War; Japanese invasion of Thailand; Burma campaign; Japanese invasion of Burma; Burma campaign (1942–1943); Battle of Northern Burma and Western Yunnan; Burma campaign (1944); Burma campaign (1944–1945); South-East Asian Theatre; Bombing of Bangkok; Cold War; Cold War in Asia; Decolonisation of Asia; Korean War; Malayan Emergency; Indochina Wars; Vietnam War; Laotian Civil War; Cambodian Civil War; Communist insurgency in Thailand; Communist insurgency in Malaysia; Third Indochina War; Cambodian conflict (1979–1998); Cambodian–Vietnamese War; Vietnamese border raids in Thailand; Thai–Laotian Border War; 1999 East Timorese crisis; International Force East Timor; Cambodia–Thailand border dispute; 2008–2013 Cambodian–Thai border crisis; 2025 Cambodian–Thai conflict
- Website: https://army1.rta.mi.th/index_Thai.htm

Commanders
- Army Commander: Lieutenant General Worayot Luengsuwan
- Deputy Army Commander: Major General Natthadet Chantrangsu; Major General Yod-Arwut Phuengpak; Major General Sitthiphon Chulapana
- Notable commanders: Prince Purachatra Jayakara (First Commander); Mom Chao Bhanthuprawat Kasemsan; His Royal Highness Prince Thosasiriwong; Field Marshal Sarit Thanarat; Field Marshal Thanom Kittikachorn; Field Marshal Praphas Charusathian; General Kris Sivara; Field Marshal Kriangkrai Attananda; General Arthit Kamlang-ek; General Somthat Attananda; General Prawit Wongsuwan; General Anupong Paochinda; General Prayut Chan-o-cha; General Udomdej Sitabutr; General Teerachai Nakwanich; General Apirat Kongsompong; General Narongphan Jitkaewtae; General Charoenchai Hinthao; General Phana Khlaeoplotthuk

The 1st Army Area (Thai: กองทัพภาคที่ 1) was established on January 13, 1910. Responsible for the Central, Eastern and Western regions, with headquarters located in Dusit subdistrict, Dusit district, Bangkok.

== History ==
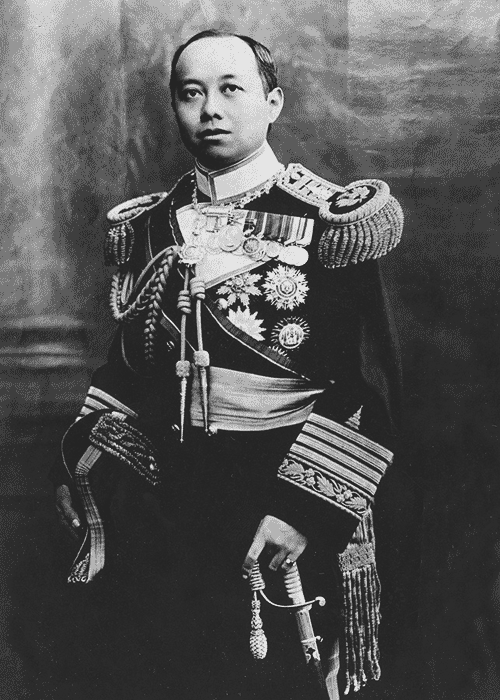
King Vajiravudh in the uniform of Admiral of the Fleet

The 1st Army Area was the first army of Royal Thai Army to be organized according to the model of Western powers. This followed King Chulalongkorn's command of the General Staff Department, which oversaw the army, to restructure and divide its command to advance military operations. The force was organized into 10 divisions distributed throughout various provinces to prepare for national defense. During the reign of King Vajiravudh, the army's manpower was reorganized, graciously ordering the organization of divisions into armies in 1910. Since January 13, 1910, King Vajiravudh established the 1st Army Area, a division that continues to this day. This marks over 100 years since its founding. The knowledge, skills, and loyalty of commanders at every level have consistently earned the 1st Army Area an outstanding reputation. This has made every soldier in the 1st Army Area extremely proud and ready to sacrifice their lives to protect the nation, religion, and monarchy. Examples of these brave soldiers include the Franco–Thai War, the Korean War, and the Vietnam War.

== Organization ==
- First Army Area - (Thai: กองทัพภาคที่ 1) – headquartered in Bangkok, controls troops in 26 provinces in central, eastern, western Thailand and Bangkok.
  - Command Division - (Thai: ส่วนบัญชาการ)
    - Headquarters and Headuqarters Company
    - 21st Signal Regiment, 1st Army Area
  - Organic Units (Thai: หน่วยขึ้นตรง)
    - 1st Army Corps
      - Headquarters and Headuqarters Company
  - Combat Division - (Thai: ส่วนการรบ)
    - First Army Area Operations Center - (Thai: ศูนย์ปฏิบัติการกองทัพภาคที่ 1)
      - Burapa Command aka Burapa Task Force - (Thai: กองกำลังเฉพาะกิจบูรพา)
        - Headquarters and Service Company
        - Quick Reaction Force Company
        - Army Aviation Squad
        - Combat Engineer Team
        - Fire Support Unit
        - Military Dogs Platoon
        - Military Intelligence Operations Team
        - Military Intelligence Unit
        - Signal Corps Unit
        - 12th Ranger Forces Regiment - (Thai: กรมทหารพรานที่ 12)
        - 13th Ranger Forces Regiment - (Thai: กรมทหารพรานที่ 13)
      - Surasee Command aka Surasee Force - (Thai: กองกำลังสุรสีห์)
        - Headquarters and Service Company
        - Army Air Defence Coordination Team
        - Army Aviation Operations Team
        - Combat Engineer Team
        - Civil Affairs Coordination Team
        - Civil Affairs Operations Team
        - Heavy Weapons Platoon
        - Military Intelligence Operations Team
        - Military Intelligence Unit
        - Queen's Cobras Task Force
        - Quick Reaction Force Platoon
        - Reconnaissance Platoon
        - Royal Initiative Projects Coordination Team
        - Signal Corps Unit
        - 14th Ranger Forces Regiment - (Thai: กรมทหารพรานที่ 14)
    - 1st Special Forces Training Company - (Thai: กองร้อยฝึกรบพิเศษที่ 1)
    - 11th Ranger Forces Regiment - (Thai: กรมทหารพรานที่ 11)
    - 1st Division, King's Guard - (Thai: กองพลที่ 1 รักษาพระองค์) (Bangkok)
      - Headquarters and Service Company, 1st Division, King's Guard
      - 31st Infantry Brigade, King's Royal Guard (Airborne forces and heliborne forces) - (Thai: กรมทหารราบที่ 31 รักษาพระองค์ ในพระบาทสมเด็จพระบรมชนกาธิเบศร มหาภูมิพลอดุลยเดชมหาราช บรมนาถบพิตร)
        - Headquarters and Service Company, 31st Infantry Brigade, King's Royal Guard
          - Heavy Mortar Company
          - Reconnaissance and Surveillance Company
          - 1st Infantry Battalion, 31st Infantry Brigade, King's Royal Guard (Airborne Infantry)
          - 2nd Infantry Battalion, 31st Infantry Brigade, King's Royal Guard (Light infantry)
          - 3rd Infantry Battalion, 31st Infantry Brigade, King's Royal Guard (Light infantry)
      - 1st Artillery Brigade, King's Royal Guard - (Thai: กรมทหารปืนใหญ่ที่ 1 รักษาพระองค์)
        - Headquarter and Service Battery, 1st Artillery Brigade, King's Royal Guard
          - 1st Artillery Battalion, 1st Artillery Brigade, King's Royal Guard
          - 11th Artillery Battalion, 1st Artillery Brigade, King's Royal Guard
          - 31st Artillery Battalion, 1st Artillery Brigade, King's Royal Guard
      - 1st Engineer Regiment - (Thai: กองพันทหารช่างที่ 1 กองพลที่ 1 รักษาพระองค์)
      - 1st Medical Regiment - (Thai: กองพันเสนารักษ์ที่ 1)
      - 4th Armoured Battalion, 1st Division, King's Royal Guard - (Thai: กองพันทหารม้าที่ 4 กองพลที่ 1 รักษาพระองค์)
      - 12th Military Police Battalion (Thai: กองพันสารวัตรทหารที่ 12 กองพลที่ 1 รักษาพระองค์)
      - 1st Signal Regiment, King's Royal Guard - (Thai: กองพันทหารสื่อสารที่ 1 รักษาพระองค์ กองพลที่ 1 รักษาพระองค์)
      - 1st Cavalry Squadron (|Reconnaissance, surveillance, and target acquisition|Reconnaissance) - (Thai: กองร้อยทหารม้าลาดตระเวนที่ 1 กองพลที่ 1 รักษาพระองค์)
      - 1st Long Range Reconnaissance Company - (Thai: กองร้อยลาดตระเวนระยะไกลที่ 1 กองพลที่ 1 รักษาพระองค์)
      - 1st Ordnance Company - (Thai: กองร้อยทหารสรรพาวุธที่ 1 กองพลที่ 1 รักษาพระองค์)
      - 1st Quartermaster Company (Thai: กองร้อยพลาธิการที่ 1 กองพลที่ 1 รักษาพระองค์)
      - Airfield Service and Control Tower Team 1
    - 2nd Infantry Division, Queen's Guard - (Thai: กองพลทหารราบที่ 2 รักษาพระองค์ ในสมเด็จพระนางเจ้าสิริกิติ์ พระบรมราชินีนาถ พระบรมราชชนนีพันปีหลวง) (Fort Phromyothi, Prachinburi Province)
      - Headquarters and Service Company, 2nd Infantry Division, Queen Sirikit's Guard
      - 2nd Infantry Brigade, Queen's Guard - (Thai: กรมทหารราบที่ 2 รักษาพระองค์ ในสมเด็จพระนางเจ้าสิริกิติ์ พระบรมราชินีนาถ พระบรมราชชนนีพันปีหลวง) - (aka "Burapha Payak" Thai: บูรพาพยัคฆ์: Eastern tigers)
        - Headquarters and Service Company, 2nd Infantry Brigade, Queen's Guard
        - 1st Mechanised Infantry Battalion, Queen's Guard
        - 2nd Infantry Battalion, Queen's Guard
        - 3rd Infantry Battalion, Queen's Guard
      - 12th Mechanised Infantry Brigade, Queen's Guard - (Thai: กรมทหารราบที่ 12 รักษาพระองค์ ในสมเด็จพระนางเจ้าสิริกิติ์ พระบรมราชินีนาถ พระบรมราชชนนีพันปีหลวง)
        - Headquarters and Service Company, 12th Infantry Brigade, Queen's Guard
        - 1st Mechanised Infantry Battalion, Queen's Guard
        - 2nd Mechanised Infantry Battalion, Queen's Guard
        - 3rd Mechanised Infantry Battalion, Queen's Guard
      - 21st Infantry Brigade, Queen's Guard - (Thai: กรมทหารราบที่ 21 รักษาพระองค์ ในสมเด็จพระนางเจ้าสิริกิติ์ พระบรมราชินีนาถ พระบรมราชชนนีพันปีหลวง) - (aka "Thahan Suea Rachini" Thai: ทหารเสือราชินี: the queen's tiger soldiers)
        - Headquarters and Service Company, 21st Infantry Brigade, Queen's Guard
        - 1st Mechanised Infantry Battalion, 21st Infantry Brigade, Queen's Guard
        - 2nd Infantry Battalion, 21st Infantry Brigade, Queen's Guard
        - 3rd Infantry Battalion, 21st Infantry Brigade, Queen's Guard
      - 2nd Artillery Brigade, Queen Sirikit's Guard - (Thai: กรมทหารปืนใหญ่ที่ 2 รักษาพระองค์ ในสมเด็จพระนางเจ้าสิริกิติ์ พระบรมราชินีนาถ พระบรมราชชนนีพันปีหลวง)
        - Headquarters and Service Battery, 2nd Artillery Brigade, Queen's Guard
        - 2nd Artillery Battalion, Queen's Guard
        - 12th Artillery Battalion, Queen's Guard
        - 21st Artillery Battalion, Queen's Guard
        - 102nd Artillery Battalion, Queen's Guard
      - 2nd Service Support Brigade, Queen's Guard
        - Logistic Battalion, 2nd Support Brigade- (Thai: กองพันทหารขนส่ง กรมสนับสนุนที่ 2)
        - Maintenance Battalion, 2nd Support Brigade- (Thai: กองพันซ่อมบำรุง กรมสนับสนุนที่ 2)
      - 2nd Armoured Battalion, Queen's Guard
      - 2nd Engineer Battalion, Queen's Guard
      - 2nd Medical Battalion, Queen's Guard
      - 2nd Signal Corps Battalion, Queen's Guard
      - 12th Military Police Battalion
      - 30th Cavalry Squadron, 2nd Infantry Division, Queen's Guard - (Thai: กองพันทหารม้าที่ 30 กองพลทหารราบที่ 2 รักษาพระองค์ ในสมเด็จพระนางเจ้าสิริกิติ์ พระบรมราชินีนาถ พระบรมราชชนนีพันปีหลวง)
      - 2nd Anti-tank Company, Queen's Guard
      - 2nd Long Range Reconnaissance Company
      - Airfield Service and Control Tower Team 2
    - 9th Infantry Division - (Thai: กองพลทหารราบที่ 9) (Fort Surasi, Kanchanaburi province)
      - Headquarters and Service Company, 9th Infantry Division
      - 9th Infantry Brigade - (Thai: กรมทหารราบที่ 9)
        - Headquarters and Service Company, 9th Infantry Brigade
        - 1st Infantry Battalion
        - 2nd Infantry Battalion
        - 3rd Infantry Battalion
      - 19th Infantry Brigade - (Thai: กรมทหารราบที่ 19)
        - Headquarters and Service Company, 19th Infantry Brigade
        - 1st Infantry Battalion
        - 2nd Infantry Battalion
        - 3rd Infantry Battalion (Designated as First Army Area Rapid Deployment Force)
      - 29th Infantry Brigade - (Thai: กรมทหารราบที่ 29)
        - Headquarters and Service Company, 29th Infantry Brigade
        - 1st Infantry Battalion
        - 2nd Infantry Battalion
        - 3rd Infantry Battalion
      - 9th Artillery Brigade - (Thai: กรมทหารปืนใหญ่ที่ 9)
        - Headquarters and Service Battery, 9th Artillery Brigade
        - 9th Field Artillery Battalion.
        - 19th Field Artillery Battalion.
        - 109th Field Artillery Battalion.
      - Service Support Brigade - (Thai: กรมสนับสนุน กองพลทหารราบที่ 9)
        - Headquarters and Service Company
        - Medical Battalion
        - Maintenance Battalion
        - Transportation Battalion
        - Detachment, Service Support Brigade, 9th Infantry Division
      - 9th Engineer Battalion
      - 9th Signal Battalion
      - 19th Cavalry Squadron
      - 9th Army Aviation Company
      - 9th Long Range Reconnaissance Company
      - 2nd Field Military Police Company, 12th Military Police Regiment
      - Fort Surasi Hospital
      - Light Ordnance Division
      - Quartermaster Division
    - 11th Infantry Division - (Thai: กองพลทหารราบที่ 11) (Fort Somdet Phra Nangklao, Chachoengsao province)
      - Headquarters and Service Company, 11th Infantry Division
      - 111th Infantry Brigade - (Thai: กรมทหารราบที่ 111)
        - Headquarters and Service Company, 111th Infantry Brigade
        - 1st Infantry Battalion
        - 2nd Infantry Battalion
        - 3rd Infantry Battalion
      - 112th Mechanised Infantry Brigade (Stryker Regiment Combat Team) - (Thai: กรมทหารราบที่ 112)
        - Headquarters and Service Company, 112th Infantry Brigade (Stryker Regiment Combat Team)
        - Heavy Mortar Company
        - Reconnaissance and Surveillance Company
        - 1st Mechanised Infantry Battalion (Stryker Battalion Combat Team)
        - 2nd Mechanised Infantry Battalion (Stryker Battalion Combat Team)
        - 3rd Mechanised Infantry Battalion (Stryker Battalion Combat Team)
      - Service Support Brigade, 11th Infantry Division - (Thai: กรมสนับสนุน กองพลทหารราบที่ 11)
        - Maintenance Regiment, Service Support Brigade, 11th Infantry Division - (Thai: กองพันซ่อมบำรุง กรมสนับสนุน กองพลทหารราบที่ 11)
    - 2nd Cavalry Division, King's Royal Guard - (Thai: กองพลทหารม้าที่ 2 รักษาพระองค์ ในพระบาทสมเด็จพระมงกุฎเกล้าเจ้าอยู่หัว) (Bangkok)
      - Headquarters and Service Squadron, 2nd Cavalry Division, King's Royal Guard
      - 1st Armoured Brigade, King Mongkutklao's Guard
        - Headquarters and Service Troop, 1st Cavalry Brigade, King's Royal Guard
        - 1st Armoured Squadron, 1st Cavalry Brigade, King's Royal Guard
        - 3rd Armoured Squadron, 1st Cavalry Brigade, King's Royal Guard
        - 17th Armoured Squadron, 1st Cavalry Brigade, King's Royal Guard
      - 4th Armoured Brigade, King's Royal Guard - (Thai: กรมทหารม้าที่ 4 รักษาพระองค์ ในสมเด็จพระศรีนครินทราบรมราชชนนี) (Fort Adisorn, Saraburi province)
        - Headquarters and Service Squadron, 4th Armoured Brigade, King's Royal Guard
        - 5th Armoured Squadron, 4th Armoured Brigade, King's Royal Guard
        - 11th Armoured Squadron, 4th Armoured Brigade, King's Royal Guard
        - 25th Armoured Squadron, 4th Armoured Brigade, King's Royal Guard
      - 5th Armoured Brigade, King's Royal Guard - (Thai: กรมทหารม้าที่ 5 รักษาพระองค์ ในพระบาทสมเด็จพระมงกุฎเกล้าเจ้าอยู่หัว)
        - Headquarters and Service Troop, 5th Armoured Brigade, King's Royal Guard
        - 20th Armoured Regiment, 5th Armoured Brigade, King's Royal Guard
        - 23rd Armoured , 5th Armoured Brigade, King's Royal Guard
        - 24th Armoured Squadron, 5th Armoured Brigade, King's Royal Guard
      - 27th Cavalry Squadron, King's Royal Guard (Fort Adisorn, Saraburi province)
      - 29th Cavalry Squadron, King's Royal Guard - (Thai: กองพันทหารม้าที่ 29 รักษาพระองค์ ในพระบาทสมเด็จพระมหาภูมิพลอดุลยเดชมหาราช บรมนาถบพิตร) (Phaya Thai district, Bangkok)
      - 12th Signal Regiment, King's Royal Guard, 2nd Cavalry Division, King's Royal Guard - (Thai: กองพันทหารสื่อสารที่ 12 รักษาพระองค์ กองพลทหารม้าที่ 2 รักษาพระองค์ ในพระบาทสมเด็จพระมงกุฎเกล้าเจ้าอยู่หัว)
      - 12th Service Support Brigade - (Thai: กรมสนับสนุนที่12)
        - Maintenance Regiment
          - 1st Forward Division Support Company - (Thai: กองร้อยสนับสนุนส่วนหน้าที่ 1)
          - 2nd Forward Division Support Company - (Thai: กองร้อยสนับสนุนส่วนหน้าที่ 1)
      - 12th Quartermaster Division, 2nd Cavalry Division, King's Royal Guard
      - Airfield Service and Control Tower Team 8, 2nd Cavalry Division, King's Royal Guard
  - Combat Service Support Division - (Thai: ส่วนสนับสนุนการช่วยรบ)
    - 1st Army Combat Service Support Command - (Thai: กองบัญชาการช่วยรบที่ 1)
      - 21st Logistics and Service Regiment, 1st Army Combat Service Support - (Thai: กองพันส่งกำลังและบริการที่ 21 กองบัญชาการช่วยรบที่ 1)
      - 21st Maintenance Battalion, 1st Army Combat Service Support - (Thai: กองพันซ่อมบำรุงที่ 21 กองบัญชาการช่วยรบที่ 1)
      - 21st Ordnance Ammunition Depot Battalion, 1st Army Combat Service Support - (Thai: กองพันสรรพาวุธกระสุนที่ 21 กองบัญชาการช่วยรบที่ 1)
      - Logistics Control Centre, 1st Army Combat Service Support - (Thai: ศูนย์ควบคุมการส่งกําลังบํารุง กองบัญชาการช่วยรบที่ 1)
      - Detachment, 1st Army Combat Service Support - (Thai: ส่วนแยก กองบัญชาการช่วยรบที่ 1)
  - Army Area Division - (Thai: ส่วนภูมิภาค)
    - 11th Military Circle - (Thai: มณฑลทหารบกที่ 11)
      - 11th Military Police Regiment
      - Band Platoon, 11th Military Circle
      - Infantry Battalion, 11th Military Circle
      - Military Prison, 11th Military Circle
    - 12nd Military Circle - (Thai: มณฑลทหารบกที่ 12)
      - 12th Military Police Regiment
      - Army Reserve Training Center, 12nd Military Circle - (Thai: ศูนย์การฝึกนักศึกษาวิชาทหาร มณฑลทหารบกที่ 12)
      - Band Platoon, 12th Military Circle
      - Military Prison, 12th Military Circle
    - 13rd Military Circle - (Thai: มณฑลทหารบกที่ 13)
      - 13rd Military Police Regiment
      - Army Reserve Training Center, 13nd Military Circle - (Thai: ศูนย์การฝึกนักศึกษาวิชาทหาร มณฑลทหารบกที่ 13)
      - Band Platoon, 13rd Military Circle
      - Military Prison, 13rd Military Circle
    - 14th Military Circle - (Thai: มณฑลทหารบกที่ 14)
      - 14th Military Police Regiment
      - Army Reserve Training Center, 14th Military Circle - (Thai: ศูนย์การฝึกนักศึกษาวิชาทหาร มณฑลทหารบกที่ 14)
      - Band Platoon, 14th Military Circle
      - Military Prison, 14th Military Circle
    - 15th Military Circle - (Thai: มณฑลทหารบกที่ 15)
      - 15th Military Circle Regiment- (Thai: กองพันมณฑลทหารบกที่ 15)
      - 15th Military Police Regiment
      - Army Reserve Training Unit, 15th Military Circle - (Thai: หน่วยการฝึกนักศึกษาวิชาทหาร มณฑลทหารบกที่ 15)
      - Band Platoon, 15th Military Circle
      - Military Prison, 15th Military Circle
    - 16th Military Circle - (Thai: มณฑลทหารบกที่ 16)
      - 16th Military Police Regiment
      - Army Reserve Training Unit, 16th Military Circle - (Thai: หน่วยการฝึกนักศึกษาวิชาทหาร มณฑลทหารบกที่ 16)
      - Band Platoon, 16th Military Circle
      - Military Prison, 16th Military Circle
    - 17th Military Circle - (Thai: มณฑลทหารบกที่ 17)
      - 17th Military Police Regiment
      - Army Reserve Training Unit, 17th Military Circle - (Thai: หน่วยการฝึกนักศึกษาวิชาทหาร มณฑลทหารบกที่ 17)
      - Band Platoon, 17th Military Circle
      - Military Prison, 17th Military Circle
    - 18th Military Circle - (Thai: มณฑลทหารบกที่ 18)
      - 18th Military Police Regiment
      - Army Reserve Training Unit, 18th Military Circle - (Thai: หน่วยการฝึกนักศึกษาวิชาทหาร มณฑลทหารบกที่ 18)
      - Band Platoon, 18th Military Circle
      - Military Prison, 18th Military Circle
    - 19th Military Circle - (Thai: มณฑลทหารบกที่ 19)
      - 19th Military Police Regiment
      - Army Reserve Training Unit, 19th Military Circle - (Thai: หน่วยการฝึกนักศึกษาวิชาทหาร มณฑลทหารบกที่ 19)
      - Band Platoon, 19th Military Circle
      - Military Prison, 19th Military Circle
  - Development Country Division (Thai: ส่วนช่วยการพัฒนาประเทศ)
    - 1st Development Division - (Thai: กองพลพัฒนาที่ 1) (Fort Sri Suriyawonge, Ratchaburi province)
      - Headquarters and Service Company, 1st Development Division
      - 1st Development Brigade - (Thai: กรมพัฒนาที่ 1)
        - 1st Development Battalion - (Thai: กองพันพัฒนาที่ 1)
      - 1st Engineer Brigade, King's Guard - (Thai: กรมทหารช่างที่ 1 รักษาพระองค์)
        - 52nd Engineer Battalion, King's Royal Guard - (Thai: กองพันทหารช่างที่ 52 รักษาพระองค์)
        - 112th Engineer Battalion, King's Royal Guard - (Thai: กองพันทหารช่างที่ 112 รักษาพระองค์)
