= 1st Division (Thailand) =

Royal Thai Army formation

1st Division, King's Guard
- กองพลที่ 1 รักษาพระองค์
- Emblem of the 1st Division, King's Guard
- Active: 1905 – present
- Country: Thailand
- Branch: Royal Thai Army
- Type: Combined arms
- Size: division
- Part of: 1st Army Area; 1st Army Corps
- Garrison/HQ: Dusit subdistrict, Dusit, Bangkok
- Nicknames: Wongthewan (วงศ์เทวัญ, Divine clique)
- Engagements: World War I; Boworadet rebellion; World War II; Franco-Thai War; Pacific War; Cold War; Communist insurgency in Thailand; Vietnamese border raids in Thailand; Thai–Laotian Border War; South Thailand insurgency; Cambodian–Thai border dispute; 2008–2011 Cambodia–Thailand border crisis; 2025 Cambodia–Thailand conflict
- Website: https://1divisionkingguard.rta.mi.th/index2.html

The 1st Division, King's Guard (Thai: กองพลที่ 1 รักษาพระองค์) (พล.๑ รอ.) is an infantry division of the Royal Thai Army, it is currently a part of the 1st Army Area. King Chulalongkorn (Rama V) founded the division in 1905. The Royal Command of King Bhumibol Adulyadej (Rama IX) designated the division as a King's Guard unit in 1973.

The division comprises one infantry regiment and four attachment units, the 31st Infantry Regiment, King's Guard. The division and its subsidiary units are mostly based in or around Bangkok, Thailand. The 31st Regiment is garrisoned in Lopburi.

== History ==
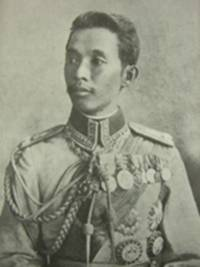
Prince Chirapravati Voradej, the Prince of Nakhon Chaisi was instrumental in reorganizing the army in 1905, he later served as Minister of Defence from 1910-1913.

The command of King Chulalongkorn formed the division in 1905 on the recommendation of the Prince Chirapravati Voradej, the director of operations of the Ministry of Defence. The Prince wanted to organize the Siamese army on European lines, comprising at least ten army divisions. By 1906, the 1st Division became fully recruited and garrisoned in Bangkok. In 1908, the army was once again reorganized, by this date the division was made up of five units (1st Infantry Regiment, King's Own Bodyguard, 2nd Infantry Regiment (the name later changed to 11th Infantry), 1st Cavalry Regiment, 1st Artillery Battery and the 1st Engineer Regiment). The 1st Division was then given the responsibility of protecting the king, his Grand Palace, the royal capital and the surrounding Menam basin.

In the early hours of 24 June 1932, a revolution broke out in Bangkok. The Khana Ratsadon (a group of disgruntled military officers and civilians) staged a coup d'état to replace the absolute rule of King Prajadhipok (Rama VII) with a constitutional monarchy. The conspirators began by arresting key military personnel in the capital, including the Commander of the 1st Infantry Division; Phraya Saena Sonogram (Mom Rajawongse Ei Noppawong) at his private residence. A scuffle ensued and an unnamed Lieutenant shot and wounded the resisting commander. Sometime later, a Major Luang Kraichingrit (Puth Vinitchaikul) of the King's Own Bodyguards ordered a company of troops towards the Makawan bridge to resist the coup; however, by that time the revolution was a fait accompli and the troops were ordered to return to their barracks. Other than this one incidence of violence, the revolution was carried out smoothly without further bloodshed. The King complied with the Khana Ratsadon's demands and Siam was granted its first Constitution in December of the same year. As a result of the coup, the new administration temporarily dissolved all formations above battalion level, including the 1st Infantry Division.

During the Franco-Thai War of 1940-1941, the division's former components incorporated the Burapha Army (Eastern army) on the orders of Field Marshal Plaek Phibunsongkhram. The division took part in the army's objectives of retaking the French Indochinese provinces of Sisophon and Battambang (now in modern-day Cambodia). After this brief conflict, the Burapha Army formation disbanded and the 1st Infantry Division commenced in 1942.

In 1948, the division moved into a permanent headquarters next to the Suan Kularb Mansion of the Dusit Palace. In 1956, the Royal Thai Army reorganized and the 1st Infantry Division came under the command of the 1st Army Area. In 1958, the division, in full, took part in the Royal guards parade to celebrate the birthday of King Bhumibol Adulyadej. Since that year, the division have taken part in the organizing and performing of the ceremony until the present day. On 2 April 1973, Royal Command designated the 1st Infantry Division as a King's Guard unit and changed its name to '1st Division, King's Guard', the first of its kind.

On 1 October 2019, 1st Infantry Regiment and 11th Infantry Regiment was put under the command of the Royal Security Command.

== Current composition ==
Locations of Main units of the 1st Division, King's Guard
- 31st Infantry Regiment, King Bhumibol's Guard (Airborne infantry, Rapid deployment force)
  - 1st Infantry Battalion, 31st Infantry Regiment, King Bhumibol's Guard
  - 2nd Infantry Battalion, 31st Infantry Regiment, King Bhumibol's Guard
  - 3rd Infantry Battalion, 31st Infantry Regiment, King Bhumibol's Guard
- 1st Field Artillery Regiment, King's Guard
  - 1st Field Artillery Battalion, 1st Field Artillery Regiment, King's Guard.
  - 11th Field Artillery Battalion, 1st Field Artillery Regiment, King's Guard.
  - 31st Field Artillery Battalion, 1st Field Artillery Regiment, King's Guard.
- 4th Tank Battalion, 1st Division, King's Guard
- 1st Combat Engineer Battalion
- 1st Signal Battalion, King's Guard
- 1st Medical Battalion
- 1st Long Range Reconnaissance Patrols Company
- 1st Cavalry Reconnaissance Squadron
- Headquarters Company
- Military Police Company
- Service Company
- Quartermaster Division
- Light Ordnance Division

== See also ==
- 2nd Infantry Division (Thailand)
- 4th Infantry Division (Thailand)
- 5th Infantry Division (Thailand)
- 7th Infantry Division (Thailand)
- 9th Infantry Division (Thailand)
- 15th Infantry Division (Thailand)
- Royal Security Command
- King's Guard (Thailand)
- Royal Thai Army
- Thai Royal Guards parade
