= 4th Tank Battalion (Thailand) =

Royal Thai Army unit

4th Tank Battalion 1st Division, King's Guard
- กองพันทหารม้าที่ 4 กองพลที่ 1 รักษาพระองค์
- Active: 1930 – present
- Country: Thailand
- Branch: Royal Thai Army
- Type: Armoured cavalry Royal guard
- Role: Armoured warfare Artillery observer Counterattack; Maneuver warfare Reconnaissance; Screening; Shock tactics Tracking
- Size: Battalion
- Part of: 1st Division, King's Guard
- Garrison/HQ: Thanon Nakhon Chai Si Subdistrict, Dusit District, Bangkok, Thailand
- Engagements: World War II; Franco-Thai War; Pacific War; Burma Campaign; Cold War; Vietnam War; Communist insurgency in Thailand; Vietnamese border raids in Thailand; Thai–Laotian Border War; Southern Insurgency; Cambodia–Thailand border dispute; 2025 Cambodian–Thai conflict
- Website: https://www.tank1004.com/(in Thai)

Commanders
- Commander: Lieutenant Colonel Akekapong Krittayakiatchuti

The 4th Tank Battalion, 1st Division, King's Guard (Thai: กองพันทหารม้าที่ 4 กองพลที่ 1 รักษาพระองค์) (ม.พัน ๔ พล.๑ รอ.) is a King's Guard Armoured Cavalry Battalion of the Royal Thai Army (RTA), it is currently a part of the 1st Division, King's Guard.

== History ==
4th Tank Battalion, 1st Division, King's Guard was originally founded in 1930 from after a transformation of 2nd Tank Battalion in Saraburi. The first commander is M.L. Tor Panomwan. Eventually in 1944 the government shut down the 4th Tank Battalion in Karnchanaburi then later transformed the 6th Tank Battalion into a new 4th Tank Battalion and in 1951 the 4th Battalion was changed again to 7th Battalion.

The 4th Battalion was re-founded in 1973 as the 2nd Tank Battalion with type M24 tanks from U.S. in Phra Nakhon province (Bangkok nowadays). The unit was established again on 1 April 1951. In 1979 the 4th Tank Battalion was appointed as King's Guard.

== Organization ==
=== Mission ===
- Engage and destroy the enemy
- Using firepower and maneuvers
- Power to terrorize
- Capable of working with other units

=== Capacity ===
- Conducting combat operations using firepower with fluency and brutality
- Ability to strike or counter-strike the enemy
- Ability to destroy enemy's vehicles
- Provide infantry support and Cavalry using destructive strategy
- Fluency in territory control
- Provide unit fire support
- Manage administration, transmission and communication and maintenance within the Battalion
- 100% operational

=== Limitation ===
- Only oneself
  - height, weight, hearing and sight
  - need for heavy maintenance
- Obstructive environment
  - terrain and weather
  - Natural and man-made Barricades

== See also ==
- 1st Division (Thailand)
- 2nd Infantry Division (Thailand)
- 7th Infantry Division (Thailand)
- 9th Infantry Division (Thailand)
- 30th Cavalry Squadron, Queen's Guard (Thailand)
- King's Guard (Thailand)
- Royal Thai Army
- Thai Royal Guards parade
