= 1st Field Artillery Regiment, King's Guard (Thailand) =

Special operations force of the Royal Thai Army

1st Field Artillery Regiment, King's Guard.
- กรมทหารปืนใหญ่ที่ 1 รักษาพระองค์
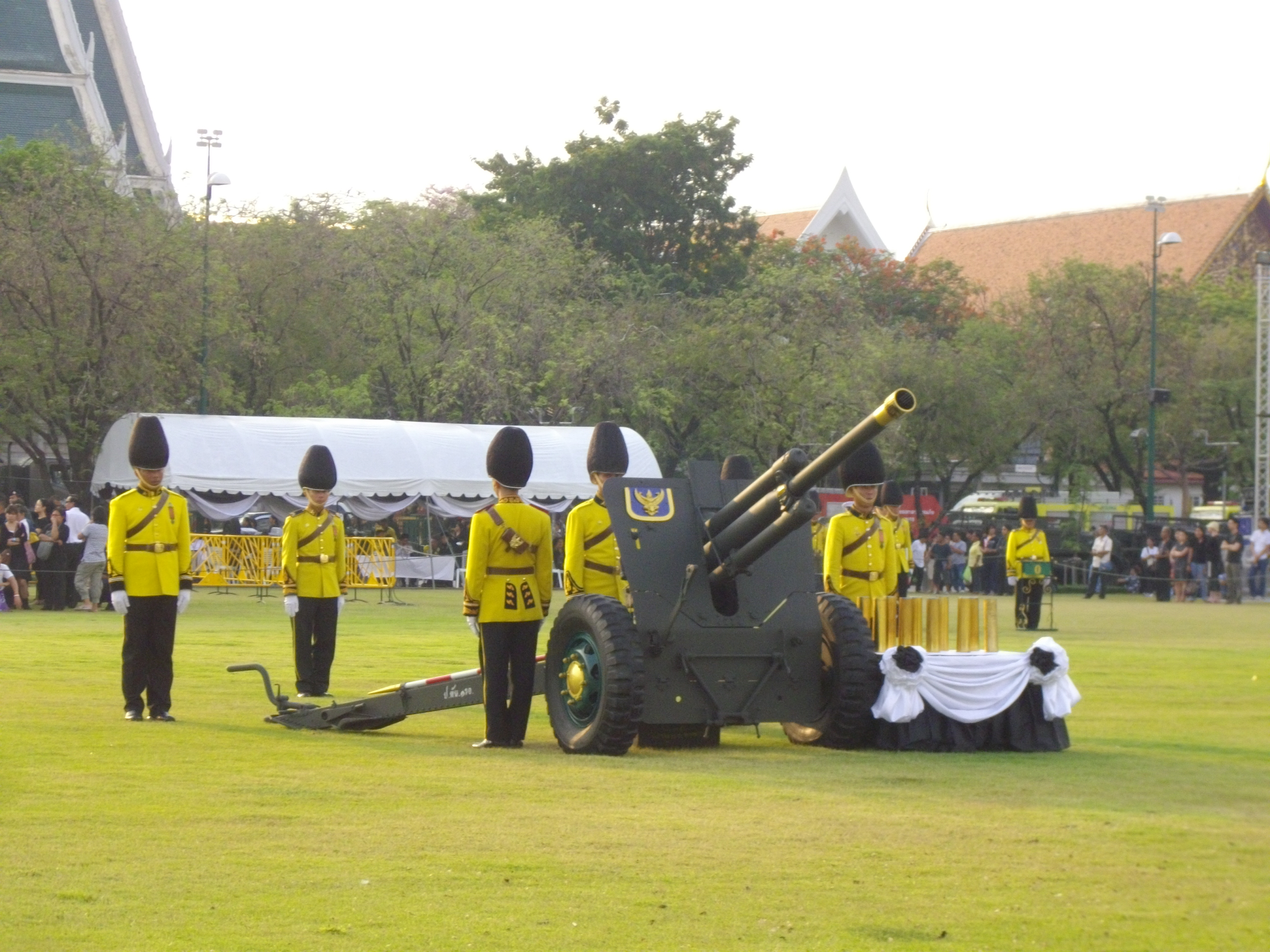
- A company of the 1st Artillery Battalion, 1st Field Artillery Regiment, King's Guard, prepared for a 21-gun salute in the royal cremation ceremony of Bejaratana Rajasuda, 2012.
- Active: 6 February 1852–present
- Country: Thailand
- Branch: Royal Thai Army
- Type: Artillery; Royal guard
- Size: Regiment
- Part of: 1st Division, King's Guard
- Garrison/HQ: Thanon Nakhon Chai Si Subdistrict, Dusit District, Bangkok, Thailand
- Engagements: Haw wars; Franco-Siamese conflict; World War I; Western Front; Boworadet rebellion; World War II; Franco-Thai War; Pacific War; Burma campaign; Cold War; Vietnam War; Laotian Civil War; Communist insurgency in Thailand; Vietnamese border raids in Thailand; Thai–Laotian Border War; Southern Insurgency
- Website: http://www.1artillery.org/arty1.php(in Thai)

Commanders
- Colonel of the Regiment: Col. Sitthijak Romphojee

The 1st Field Artillery Regiment, King's Guard (Thai: กรมทหารปืนใหญ่ที่ 1 รักษาพระองค์) (ป.๑ รอ.) is an Artillery Regiment of the Royal Thai Army, it is currently a part of the 1st Infantry Division, King's Guard. The unit is composed of the 1st Field Artillery Battalion, 11th Field Artillery Battalion and 31st Field Artillery Battalion.

== History ==
In 1852, King Mongkut (Rama IV) ordered the raising of the Volunteer Vietnamese Artillery Division to replace the Vietnamese Volunteers Division that formerly transferred the mastery to the Front Palace. This division has the former governor who is the confide of the king's commander, namely Phraya Manrattana Rachawalop and Phraya Phichai. Alongside this, the existing Guards Artillery Regiment was reorganized in European lines as a royal guard artillery unit, and personnel of several units of the RTA, including European gunners of a number of artillery batteries, were transferred.

In 1853 Major Krom Muen Mahesuan Sivavilas was named commander of the artillery battalion of the "Tahan Lorm Wang" (Palace bodyguards) Brigade, which was raised as part of the modernization of the army. Major Phraya Siharat Dechochai was later named commander in 1854 and the unit was reorganized, its training now on European lines of the field artillery of the period. In 1907, the 1st Field Artillery Regiment, created on the basis of the artillery battalions in the Bangkok area and in a number of cities, was granted the status and dignity of a Royal Guard unit by HM King Chulalongkorn (Rama V). Disbanded in 1932, it was recreated in 1947 following the Second World War.

Its regimental anniversary is held every 6 February.

== Organization ==
- 1st Field Artillery Regiment, King's Guard Headquarter located in Bangkok
- 1st Field Artillery Battalion, 1st Field Artillery Regiment, King's Guard located in Bangkok
- 11th Field Artillery Battalion, 1st Field Artillery Regiment, King's Guard located in Mueang Lopburi district
- 31st Field Artillery Battalion, 1st Field Artillery Regiment, King's Guard located in Mueang Lopburi district

== See also ==
- 1st Division, King's Guard
- 2nd Infantry Division (Thailand)
- 7th Infantry Division (Thailand)
- 9th Infantry Division (Thailand)
- King's Guard (Thailand)
- Royal Thai Army
- Thai Royal Guards parade
