= King's Guard (Thailand) =

- ทหารรักษาพระองค์
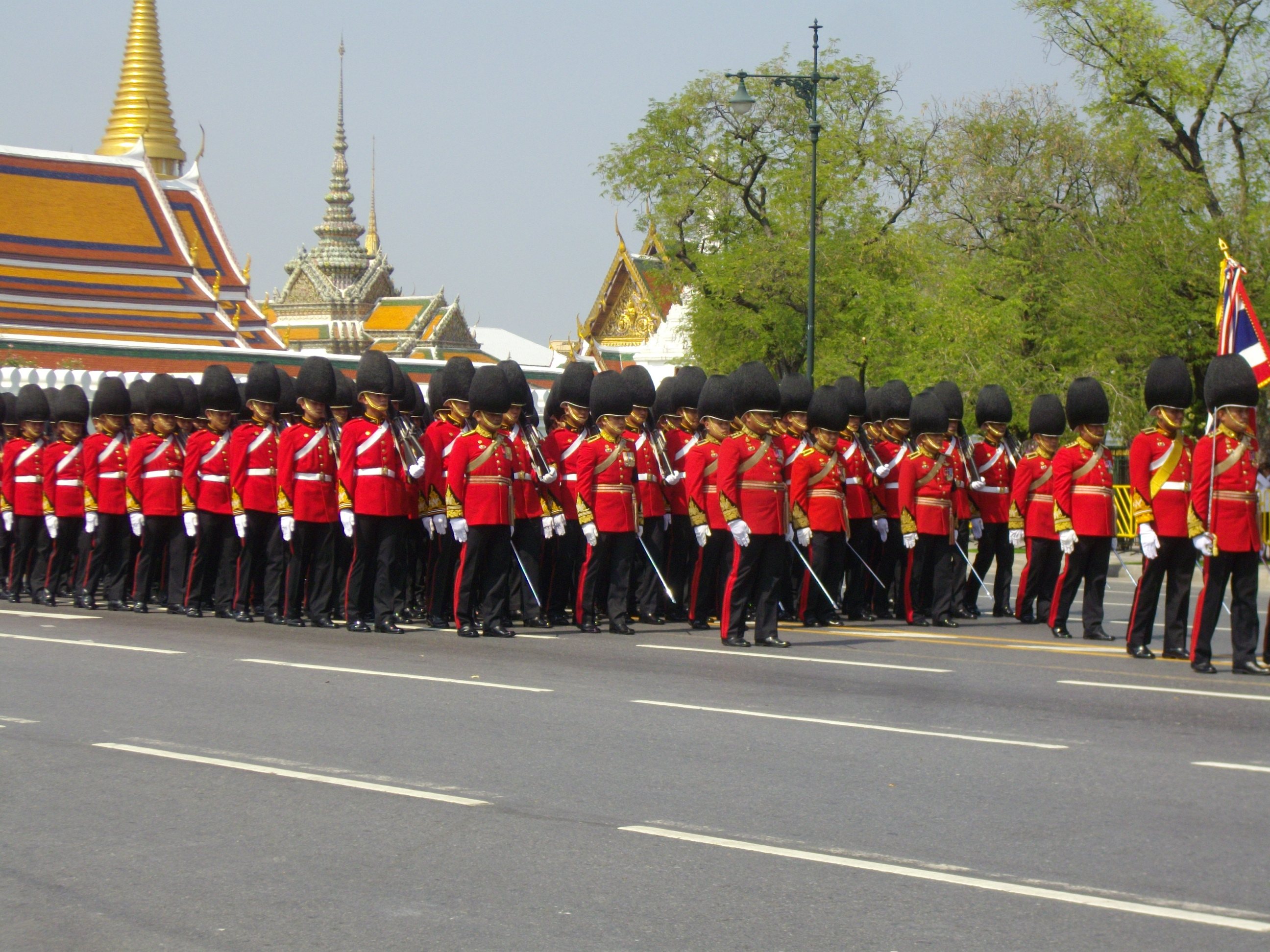
- King's Guard during a royal ceremony in 2012
- Active: 1859–present
- Country: (Thailand) Siam (1859–1948); Thailand (1948–present)
- Branch: Royal Thai Army; Royal Thai Navy; Royal Thai Air Force
- Type: Guard Corps (Army); Guard Brigade (Navy and Air Force)
- Role: Executive protection
- Size: 87 regimental units
- March: Royal Guards March (มาร์ชราชวัลลภ, March Raja Vanlop)

The King's Guard (Thai: ทหารรักษาพระองค์; RTGS: Thahan Raksa Phra Ong) is a ceremonial designation given by the Monarchy of Thailand to the various units within the Royal Thai Armed Forces. Practical and real security of the Royal family has since 1992 been provided by the Royal Security Command, which is an agency that is completely independent of the armed forces.

== History ==
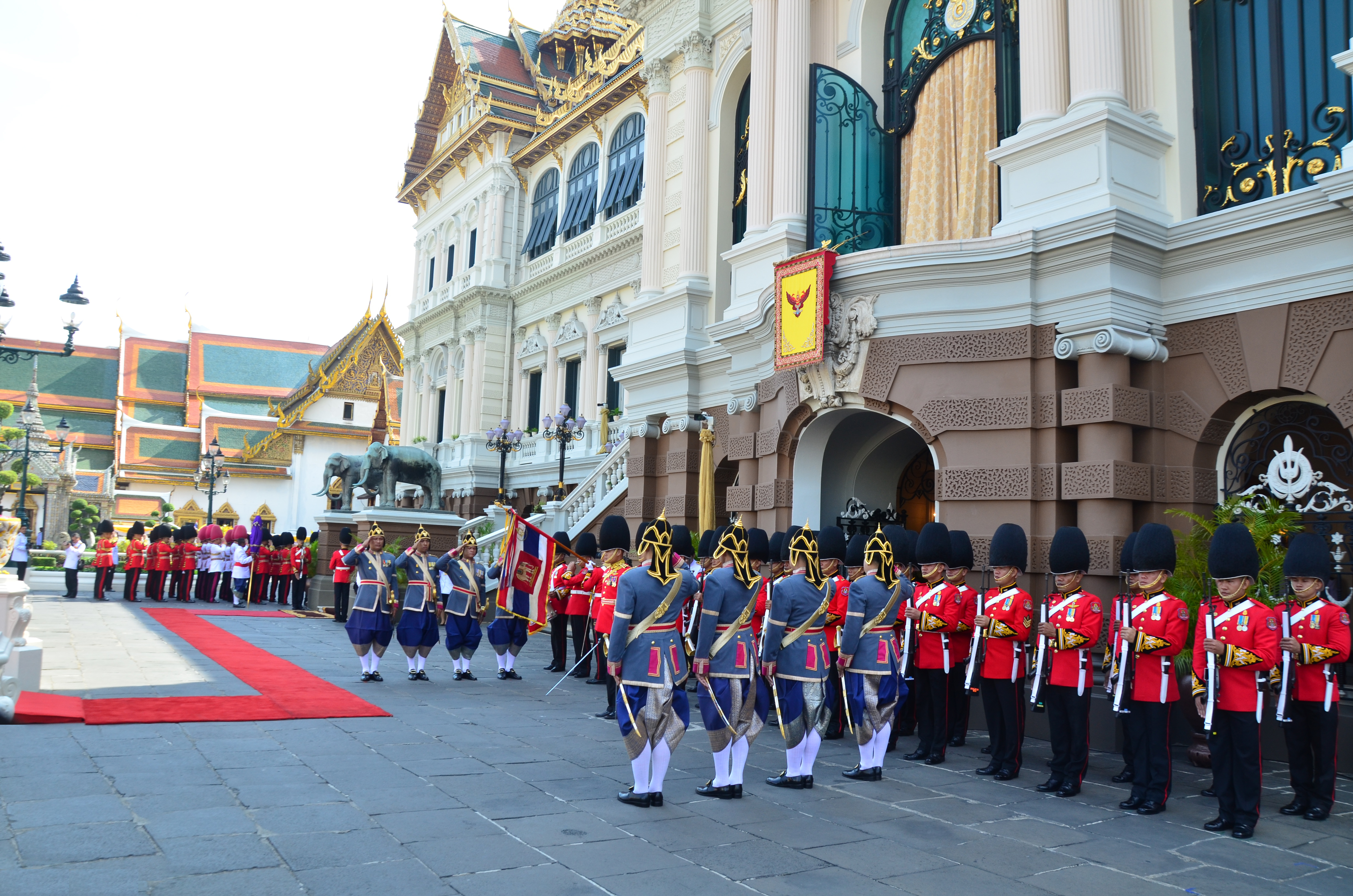
King's Guard at Grand Palace

The first Royal Guards unit was established by King Chulalongkorn (Rama V) in 1859, when he was still the heir. Initially, the Royal Guards were servants with duties such as scaring crows, which led to commoners referring to them as the "Mahat Lek Lai Ka," roughly translated as "Scarecrow Corps".

When he succeeded his father in 1868, King Chulalongkorn took his Royal Guard and formed a 24-strong Royal Bodyguard, referred to as the "Thahan Song Lo" (Two-Dozen soldiers"). In 1870, the Royal Guard regiment were given the name the "King's Guard" and their duties included escorting the king while he travelled around the country.

About the year 1875 the necessity for surveys in connection with improvements in the city of Bangkok, and for supervision in carrying out these improvements, led to the selection of certain officers of the royal bodyguard for training in this direction. These officers were formed into a special company called "Military Engineers of the Royal Bodyguard," in which Mr. James McCarthy held the rank of captain. A royal decree issued September 3, 1885, separated the surveyors from the royal bodyguard and created the Royal Survey Department, which is now the Royal Thai Survey Department (Thai: กรมแผนที่ทหาร), a Special Services Group of the Royal Thai Armed Forces Headquarters.

The Royal Guards still exist down to the present and many more units from all branches of the armed forces were given this distinction. Today's King's Guard units serve as the Thai equivalent to the ceremonial guard units of various countries. However, the role of the actual protection of the Royal family has been taken over by the Royal Security Command, established in 1992, with King Vajiralongkorn as its commander.

== King's Guard units (until 2024) ==
In 2019, The Royal Guards were composed of 87 formations (formerly 94 battalions or equivalents), mostly found in the Royal Thai Army.

=== Royal Security Command ===
The Royal Security Command is in charge of two Infantry regiments:

- 1st Infantry Regiment, King's Close Bodyguard (Thai: มหาดเล็กราชวัลลภ; RTGS: mahat lek ratcha wanlop), 'The king's close bodyguards')
  - 1st Infantry Battalion, 1st King's Own Bodyguard Regiment
  - 2nd Infantry Battalion, 1st King's Own Bodyguard Regiment
  - 3rd Infantry Battalion, 1st King's Own Bodyguard Regiment
- 11th Infantry Regiment, King's Close Bodyguard, (Thai: ทหารล้อมวัง; RTGS: thahan lom wang), 'The palace bodyguards')
  - 1st Infantry Battalion, 11th King's Own Bodyguard Regiment
  - 2nd Infantry Battalion, 11th King's Own Bodyguard Regiment
  - 3rd Infantry Battalion, 11th King's Own Bodyguard Regiment

=== Royal Thai Army ===
Cadet unit

- Chulachomklao Royal Military Academy Cadet Regiment, King's Guard (Cadet students of the Royal Military Academy)
  - 1st Cadet Battalion, Chulachomklao Royal Military Academy Cadet Regiment, King's Guard, Chulachomklao Royal Military Academy
  - 2nd Cadet Battalion, Chulachomklao Royal Military Academy Cadet Regiment, King's Guard, Chulachomklao Royal Military Academy
  - 3rd Cadet Battalion, Chulachomklao Royal Military Academy Cadet Regiment, King's Guard, Chulachomklao Royal Military Academy
  - 4th Cadet Battalion, Chulachomklao Royal Military Academy Cadet Regiment, King's Guard, Chulachomklao Royal Military Academy

Infantry units

- 1st Division, King's Guard
  - 31st Infantry Regiment, King Bhumibol's Guard (Airborne)
    - 1st Infantry Battalion, 31st Infantry Regiment, King Bhumibol's Guard
    - 2nd Infantry Battalion, 31st Infantry Regiment, King Bhumibol's Guard
    - 3rd Infantry Battalion, 31st Infantry Regiment, King Bhumibol's Guard
- 2nd Infantry Division, Queen Sirikit's Guard (Designated in honour of Queen Sirikit in 1988)
  - 2nd Infantry Regiment, Queen Sirikit's Guard
    - 1st Infantry Battalion, 2nd Infantry Regiment, Queen Sirikit's Guard
    - 2nd Infantry Battalion, 2nd Infantry Regiment, Queen Sirikit's Guard
    - 3rd Infantry Battalion, 2nd Infantry Regiment, Queen Sirikit's Guard
  - 12th Infantry Regiment, Queen Sirikit's Guard
    - 1st Infantry Battalion, 12th Infantry Regiment, Queen Sirikit's Guard
    - 2nd Infantry Battalion, 12th Infantry Regiment, Queen Sirikit's Guard
    - 3rd Infantry Battalion, 12th Infantry Regiment, Queen Sirikit's Guard
  - 21st Infantry Regiment, Queen Sirikit's Guard (a.k.a. "Thahan Suea Rachini" Thai: ทหารเสือราชินี: the queen's tiger soldiers)
    - 1st Infantry Battalion, 21st Infantry Regiment, Queen Sirikit's Guard
    - 2nd Infantry Battalion, 21st Infantry Regiment, Queen Sirikit's Guard
    - 3rd Infantry Battalion, 21st Infantry Regiment, Queen Sirikit's Guard

Cavalry units

- 2nd Cavalry Division, King Vajiravudh's Guard
    - 27th Cavalry Squadron, 2nd Cavalry Division, King Vajiravudh's Guard
    - 29th Cavalry Squadron, King Bhumibol's Guard
  - 1st Cavalry Regiment, King Vajiravudh's Guard
    - 1st Cavalry Squadron, 1st Cavalry Regiment, King Vajiravudh's Guard
    - 3rd Cavalry Squadron, 1st Cavalry Regiment, King Vajiravudh's Guard
    - 17th Cavalry Squadron, 1st Cavalry Regiment, King Vajiravudh's Guard
  - 4th Cavalry Regiment, Princess Srinagarindra's Guard
    - 5th Cavalry Squadron, 4th Cavalry Regiment, Princess Srinagarindra's Guard
    - 11th Cavalry Squadron, 4th Cavalry Regiment, Princess Srinagarindra's Guard
    - 25th Cavalry Squadron, 4th Cavalry Regiment, Princess Srinagarindra's Guard
  - 5th Cavalry Regiment, King Vajiravudh's Guard
    - 20th Cavalry Squadron, 5th Cavalry Regiment, King Vajiravudh's Guard
    - 23rd Cavalry Squadron, 5th Cavalry Regiment, King Vajiravudh's Guard
    - 24th Cavalry Squadron, 5th Cavalry Regiment, King Vajiravudh's Guard
- 4th Tank Battalion, Princess Srinagarindra's Guard, 1st Division, King's Guard
- 2nd Cavalry Squadron, 2nd Infantry Division, Queen Sirikit's Guard
- 30th Cavalry Squadron, 2nd Infantry Division, Queen Sirikit's Guard

Artillery units

- 1st Field Artillery Regiment, King's Guard
  - 1st Field Artillery Battalion, 1st Field Artillery Regiment, King's Guard
  - 11th Field Artillery Battalion, 1st Field Artillery Regiment, King's Guard
  - 31st Field Artillery Battalion, 1st Field Artillery Regiment, King's Guard
- 2nd Field Artillery Regiment, Queen Sirikit's Guard
  - 2nd Field Artillery Battalion, 2nd Field Artillery Regiment, Queen Sirikit's Guard
  - 12th Field Artillery Battalion, 2nd Field Artillery Regiment, Queen Sirikit's Guard
  - 21st Field Artillery Battalion, 2nd Field Artillery Regiment, Queen Sirikit's Guard
  - 102nd Field Artillery Battalion, 2nd Field Artillery Regiment, Queen Sirikit's Guard
- 1st Air Defense Artillery Battalion, King's Guard, 2nd Air Defense Artillery Regiment

Engineer units

- 1st Engineer Regiment, King's Guard
  - 52nd Engineer Battalion, 1st Engineer Regiment, King's Guard
  - 112th Engineer Battalion, 1st Engineer Regiment, King's Guard
- 1st Engineer Battalion, King's Guard, 1st Division, King's Guard
- 2nd Engineer Battalion, Queen Sirikit's Guard, 2nd Infantry Division, Queen Sirikit's Guard

Special Operations

- 3rd Special Forces Regiment, King's Guard
  - Ranger Battalion, King's Guard (Royal Thai Army Ranger)
  - Special Operation Battalion, King's Guard (Task Force 90)

=== Royal Thai Navy ===
Cadet unit

- Naval Cadet Regiment, King's Guard (Cadet students of the Royal Naval Academy)
  - 1st Cadet Battalion, Naval Cadet Regiment, King's Guard, Royal Thai Naval Academy
  - 2nd Cadet Battalion, Naval Cadet Regiment, King's Guard, Royal Thai Naval Academy
  - 3rd Cadet Battalion, Naval Cadet Regiment, King's Guard, Royal Thai Naval Academy
  - 4th Cadet Battalion, Naval Cadet Regiment, King's Guard, Royal Thai Naval Academy

Royal Thai Marine Corps

- 1st Marine Battalion, King's Guard, 1st Infantry Regiment, Marine Division, Royal Thai Marine Corps
- 9th Marine Battalion, King's Guard, 3rd Infantry Regiment, Marine Division, Royal Thai Marine Corps

=== Royal Thai Air Force ===
Cadet unit

- Air Cadet Regiment, King's Guard, Navaminda Kasatriyadhiraj Royal Thai Air Force Academy (Cadet students of the Royal Air Force Academy)
  - 1st Cadet Battalion, Air Cadet Regiment, King's Guard, Navaminda Kasatriyadhiraj Royal Thai Air Force Academy
  - 2nd Cadet Battalion, Air Cadet Regiment, King's Guard, Navaminda Kasatriyadhiraj Royal Thai Air Force Academy
  - 3rd Cadet Battalion, Air Cadet Regiment, King's Guard, Navaminda Kasatriyadhiraj Royal Thai Air Force Academy
  - 4th Cadet Battalion, Air Cadet Regiment, King's Guard, Navaminda Kasatriyadhiraj Royal Thai Air Force Academy
  - 5th Cadet Battalion, Air Cadet Regiment, King's Guard, Navaminda Kasatriyadhiraj Royal Thai Air Force Academy

Royal Thai Air Force Security Force Regiment

- Royal Thai Air Force Security Force Regiment, King's Guard, Royal Thai Air Force Security Force Command
  - 1st Security Force Battalion, Royal Thai Air Force Security Force Regiment, King's Guard, Royal Thai Air Force Security Force Command
  - 2nd Security Force Battalion, Royal Thai Air Force Security Force Regiment, King's Guard, Royal Thai Air Force Security Force Command
  - 3rd Security Force Battalion, Royal Thai Air Force Security Force Regiment, King's Guard, Royal Thai Air Force Security Force Command

Anti-Aircraft Artillery

- Anti-Aircraft Artillery Regiment, King's Guard
  - 1st Anti-Aircraft Artillery Battalion, Anti-Aircraft Artillery Regiment, King's Guard
  - 2nd Anti-Aircraft Artillery Battalion, Anti-Aircraft Artillery Regiment, King's Guard
  - 3rd Anti-Aircraft Artillery Battalion, Anti-Aircraft Artillery Regiment, King's Guard

== King's Guard units (since 2024) ==
In 2024, The Royal Guards were composed of 63 formations (formerly 87 battalions or equivalents) excluded units under Royal Security Command.

=== Royal Security Command ===
- King Close Bodyguard Regiment, King Close Bodyguard Command, Royal Security Command
  - 1st King Close Bodyguard Battalion, King Close Bodyguard Regiment, King Close Bodyguard Command, Royal Security Command
  - 2nd King Close Bodyguard Battalion, King Close Bodyguard Regiment, King Close Bodyguard Command, Royal Security Command
  - 3rd King Close Bodyguard Battalion, King Close Bodyguard Regiment, King Close Bodyguard Command, Royal Security Command
- King Close Palace Guard Regiment, King Close Bodyguard Command, Royal Security Command ("Thahan Raksa Wang", formerly 3rd Infantry Battalion, 1st King's Own Bodyguard Regiment)
  - 1st King Close Palace Guard Battalion, King Close Palace Guard Regiment, King Close Bodyguard Command, Royal Security Command
  - 2nd King Close Palace Guard Battalion, King Close Palace Guard Regiment, King Close Bodyguard Command, Royal Security Command
  - Royal Court Battalion, King Close Palace Guard Regiment, King Close Bodyguard Command, Royal Security Command
- 21st King Close Bodyguard Regiment, King's Guard, King Close Bodyguard Regiment, King Close Bodyguard Command, Royal Security Command (formerly 1st Infantry Regiment, King Close Bodyguard)
  - 1st King Close Bodyguard Battalion, 21st King Close Bodyguard Regiment, King's Guard, King Close Bodyguard Regiment, King Close Bodyguard Command, Royal Security Command
  - 2nd King Close Bodyguard Battalion, 21st King Close Bodyguard Regiment, King's Guard, King Close Bodyguard Regiment, King Close Bodyguard Command, Royal Security Command
  - 3rd King Close Bodyguard Battalion, 21st King Close Bodyguard Regiment, King's Guard, King Close Bodyguard Regiment, King Close Bodyguard Command, Royal Security Command
- 11th King Close Bodyguard Regiment, King's Guard, King Close Bodyguard Regiment, King Close Bodyguard Command, Royal Security Command ("Thahan Lom Wang", formerly 11th Infantry Regiment, King Close Bodyguard)
  - 1st King Close Bodyguard Battalion, 11th King Close Bodyguard Regiment, King's Guard, King Close Bodyguard Regiment, King Close Bodyguard Command, Royal Security Command
  - 2nd King Close Bodyguard Battalion, 11th King Close Bodyguard Regiment, King's Guard, King Close Bodyguard Regiment, King Close Bodyguard Command, Royal Security Command
  - 3rd King Close Bodyguard Battalion, 11th King Close Bodyguard Regiment, King's Guard, King Close Bodyguard Regiment, King Close Bodyguard Command, Royal Security Command

=== Royal Thai Army ===
Cadet unit

- Chulachomklao Royal Military Academy Cadet Regiment, King's Guard, Chulachomklao Royal Military Academy
  - 1st Cadet Battalion, Chulachomklao Royal Military Academy Cadet Regiment, King's Guard, Chulachomklao Royal Military Academy
  - 2nd Cadet Battalion, Chulachomklao Royal Military Academy Cadet Regiment, King's Guard, Chulachomklao Royal Military Academy
  - 3rd Cadet Battalion, Chulachomklao Royal Military Academy Cadet Regiment, King's Guard, Chulachomklao Royal Military Academy
  - 4th Cadet Battalion, Chulachomklao Royal Military Academy Cadet Regiment, King's Guard, Chulachomklao Royal Military Academy

Infantry unit

- 1st Division, King's Guard
  - 31st Infantry Regiment, King Bhumibol's Guard (Airborne)
    - 1st Infantry Battalion, 31st Infantry Regiment, King Bhumibol's Guard
    - 2nd Infantry Battalion, 31st Infantry Regiment, King Bhumibol's Guard
    - 3rd Infantry Battalion, 31st Infantry Regiment, King Bhumibol's Guard
- 2nd Infantry Division, King's Guard
  - 2nd Infantry Regiment, King's Guard
    - 1st Infantry Battalion, 2nd Infantry Regiment, King's Guard
    - 2nd Infantry Battalion, 2nd Infantry Regiment, King's Guard
    - 3rd Infantry Battalion, 2nd Infantry Regiment, King's Guard
  - 12th Infantry Regiment, Queen Sirikit's Guard
    - 1st Infantry Battalion, 12th Infantry Regiment, King's Guard
    - 2nd Infantry Battalion, 12th Infantry Regiment, King's Guard
    - 3rd Infantry Battalion, 12th Infantry Regiment, King's Guard
  - 902 Infantry Regiment, King Vajiralongkorn's Guard
    - 1st Infantry Battalion, 902 Infantry Regiment, King Vajiralongkorn's Guard
    - 2nd Infantry Battalion, 902 Infantry Regiment, King Vajiralongkorn's Guard
    - 3rd Infantry Battalion, 902 Infantry Regiment, King Vajiralongkorn's Guard

Cavalry unit

- 2nd Cavalry Division, King Vajiravudh's Guard
  - 1st Cavalry Regiment, King Vajiravudh's Guard
    - 1st Cavalry Squadron, 1st Cavalry Regiment, King Vajiravudh's Guard
    - 3rd Cavalry Squadron, 1st Cavalry Regiment, King Vajiravudh's Guard
    - 17th Cavalry Squadron, 1st Cavalry Regiment, King Vajiravudh's Guard
  - 4th Cavalry Regiment, Princess Srinagarindra's Guard
    - 5th Cavalry Squadron, 4th Cavalry Regiment, Princess Srinagarindra's Guard
    - 11th Cavalry Squadron, 4th Cavalry Regiment, Princess Srinagarindra's Guard
    - 25th Cavalry Squadron, 4th Cavalry Regiment, Princess Srinagarindra's Guard
  - 5th Cavalry Regiment, King Vajiravudh's Guard
    - 20th Cavalry Squadron, 5th Cavalry Regiment, King Vajiravudh's Guard
    - 23rd Cavalry Squadron, 5th Cavalry Regiment, King Vajiravudh's Guard
    - 24th Cavalry Squadron, 5th Cavalry Regiment, King Vajiravudh's Guard
  - 29th Cavalry Squadron, King Bhumibol's Guard

Artillery unit

- 1st Field Artillery Regiment, King's Guard
  - 1st Field Artillery Battalion, 1st Field Artillery Regiment, King's Guard
  - 11th Field Artillery Battalion, 1st Field Artillery Regiment, King's Guard
  - 31st Field Artillery Battalion, 1st Field Artillery Regiment, King's Guard
- 2nd Field Artillery Regiment, King Vajiralongkorn's Guard
  - 2nd Field Artillery Battalion, 2nd Field Artillery Regiment, King's Guard
  - 12th Field Artillery Battalion, 2nd Field Artillery Regiment, King's Guard
  - 902 Field Artillery Battalion, 2nd Field Artillery Regiment, King's Guard
  - 102nd Field Artillery Battalion, 2nd Field Artillery Regiment, King's Guard

=== Royal Thai Navy ===
Cadet unit

- Naval Cadet Regiment, King's Guard, Royal Thai Naval Academy
  - 1st Cadet Battalion, Naval Cadet Regiment, King's Guard, Royal Thai Naval Academy
  - 2nd Cadet Battalion, Naval Cadet Regiment, King's Guard, Royal Thai Naval Academy
  - 3rd Cadet Battalion, Naval Cadet Regiment, King's Guard, Royal Thai Naval Academy
  - 4th Cadet Battalion, Naval Cadet Regiment, King's Guard, Royal Thai Naval Academy

Royal Thai Marine Corps

- 1st Marine Battalion, King's Guard, 1st Infantry Regiment, Marine Division, Royal Thai Marine Corps
- 9th Marine Battalion, King's Guard, 3rd Infantry Regiment, Marine Division, Royal Thai Marine Corps

=== Royal Thai Air Force ===
Cadet Unit

- Air Cadet Regiment, King's Guard, Navaminda Kasatriyadhiraj Royal Thai Air Force Academy
  - 1st Cadet Battalion, Air Cadet Regiment, King's Guard, Navaminda Kasatriyadhiraj Royal Thai Air Force Academy
  - 2nd Cadet Battalion, Air Cadet Regiment, King's Guard, Navaminda Kasatriyadhiraj Royal Thai Air Force Academy
  - 3rd Cadet Battalion, Air Cadet Regiment, King's Guard, Navaminda Kasatriyadhiraj Royal Thai Air Force Academy
  - 4th Cadet Battalion, Air Cadet Regiment, King's Guard, Navaminda Kasatriyadhiraj Royal Thai Air Force Academy
  - 5th Cadet Battalion, Air Cadet Regiment, King's Guard, Navaminda Kasatriyadhiraj Royal Thai Air Force Academy

Royal Thai Air Force Security Force

- Royal Thai Air Force Security Force Regiment, King's Guard, Royal Thai Air Force Security Force Command
  - 1st Security Force Battalion, Royal Thai Air Force Security Force Regiment, King's Guard, Royal Thai Air Force Security Force Command
  - 2nd Security Force Battalion, Royal Thai Air Force Security Force Regiment, King's Guard, Royal Thai Air Force Security Force Command
  - 3rd Security Force Battalion, Royal Thai Air Force Security Force Regiment, King's Guard, Royal Thai Air Force Security Force Command

== Former King's Guard units ==
=== Royal Thai Army ===
Infantry units

- 4th Infantry Battalion, 1st Infantry Regiment, King Chulalongkorn's Guard (amalgamated with the Royal Security Command as King Close Bodyguard Command in 2017)

Cavalry units

- 2nd Cavalry Squadron, Queen Sirikit's Guard, 2nd Infantry Division, Queen Sirikit's Guard
- 4th Tank Battalion, Princess Srinagarindra's Guard, 1st Division, King's Guard
- 27th Cavalry Squadron King's Guard, 2nd Cavalry Division, King Vajiravudh's Guard
- 30th Cavalry Squadron, Queen Sirikit's Guard, 2nd Infantry Division, Queen Sirikit's Guard

Artillery units

- 1st Air Defense Artillery Battalion, King's Guard, 2nd Air Defense Artillery Regiment

Engineer units

- 1st Engineer Regiment, King's Guard
  - 52nd Engineer Battalion, 1st Engineer Regiment, King's Guard
  - 112th Engineer Battalion, 1st Engineer Regiment, King's Guard
- 1st Engineer Battalion, King's Guard, 1st Division, King's Guard
- 2nd Engineer Battalion, Queen Sirikit's Guard, 2nd Infantry Division, Queen Sirikit's Guard

Signal units

- 1st Signal Battalion, King's Guard
- 12th Signal Battalion, King's Guard
- 2nd Signal Battalion, 2nd Infantry Division, Queen Sirikit's Guard

Medical units

- 1st Medical Battalion, 1st Division, King's Guard
- 2nd Medical Battalion, 2nd Infantry Division, Queen Sirikit's Guard

Ordnance units

- Maintenance Battalion, Support Regiment, 2nd Cavalry Division, King Vajiravudh's Guard
- Maintenance Battalion, Support Regiment, 2nd Infantry Division, Queen Sirikit's Guard

Transportation units

- Transportation Regiment, King's Guard
  - 1st Transportation Battalion, Transportation Regiment, King's Guard
  - 2nd Transportation Battalion Combat Team, Transportation Regiment, King's Guard

Special Operations

- 3rd Special Force Regiment, King's Guard
  - Ranger Battalion, King's Guard, 3rd Special Force Regiment, King's Guard
  - Special Operation Regiment, King's Guard, 3rd Special Force Regiment, King's Guard

=== Royal Thai Navy ===
Royal Thai Marine Corps

- Marine Command Garrison, 1st Infantry Regiment, King's Guard, Marine Division, Royal Thai Marine Corps
- Marine Command Garrison, 3rd Infantry Regiment, King's Guard, Marine Division, Royal Thai Marine Corps

=== Royal Thai Air Force ===
Squadrons

- 201 Helicopter Squadrons, King's Guard
- 602 Royal Flight Squadrons, King's Guard

Anti-Aircraft Artillery

- Anti-Aircraft Artillery Regiment, King's Guard
  - 1st Anti-Aircraft Artillery Battalion, Anti-Aircraft Artillery Regiment, King's Guard
  - 2nd Anti-Aircraft Artillery Battalion, Anti-Aircraft Artillery Regiment, King's Guard
  - 3rd Anti-Aircraft Artillery Battalion, Anti-Aircraft Artillery Regiment, King's Guard

== Royal Military Endorsement units ==
In addition, they established their own endorsement units. They are mostly retired, currently they have only three units left.

=== Royal Thai Army ===
==== Active ====
- 6th Cavalry Squadron, 6th Cavalry Regiment, Queen Saovabha Phongsri's Endorsement Unit
- 14th Cavalry Squadron, 7th Cavalry Regiment, Queen Saovabha Phongsri's Endorsement Unit
- 3rd Infantry Battalion, 17th Infantry Regiment, Princess Srinagarindra's Endorsement Unit

==== Former ====
- 1st Infantry Battalion, 3rd Infantry Regiment, King's Endorsement Unit
- 6th Infantry Regiment, Crown Prince's Endorsement Unit
  - 1st Infantry Battalion, 6th Infantry Regiment, Crown Prince's Endorsement Unit
  - 2nd Infantry Battalion, 6th Infantry Regiment, Crown Prince's Endorsement Unit
  - 3rd Infantry Battalion, 6th Infantry Regiment, Crown Prince's Endorsement Unit
- 1st Infantry Battalion, 7th Infantry Regiment, King's Endorsement Unit
- 2nd Infantry Battalion, 5th Infantry Regiment, King's Endorsement Unit
- 3rd Infantry Battalion, 5th Infantry Regiment, Princess Royal's Endorsement Unit
- 152nd Infantry Regiment, Princess Royal's Endorsement Unit
  - 1st Infantry Battalion, 152nd Infantry Regiment, Princess Royal's Endorsement Unit
  - 2nd Infantry Battalion, 152nd Infantry Regiment, Princess Royal's Endorsement Unit
  - 3rd Infantry Battalion, 152nd Infantry Regiment, Princess Royal's Endorsement Unit
- 1st Infantry Battalion, Infantry Center, King's Endorsement Unit

== Gallery ==
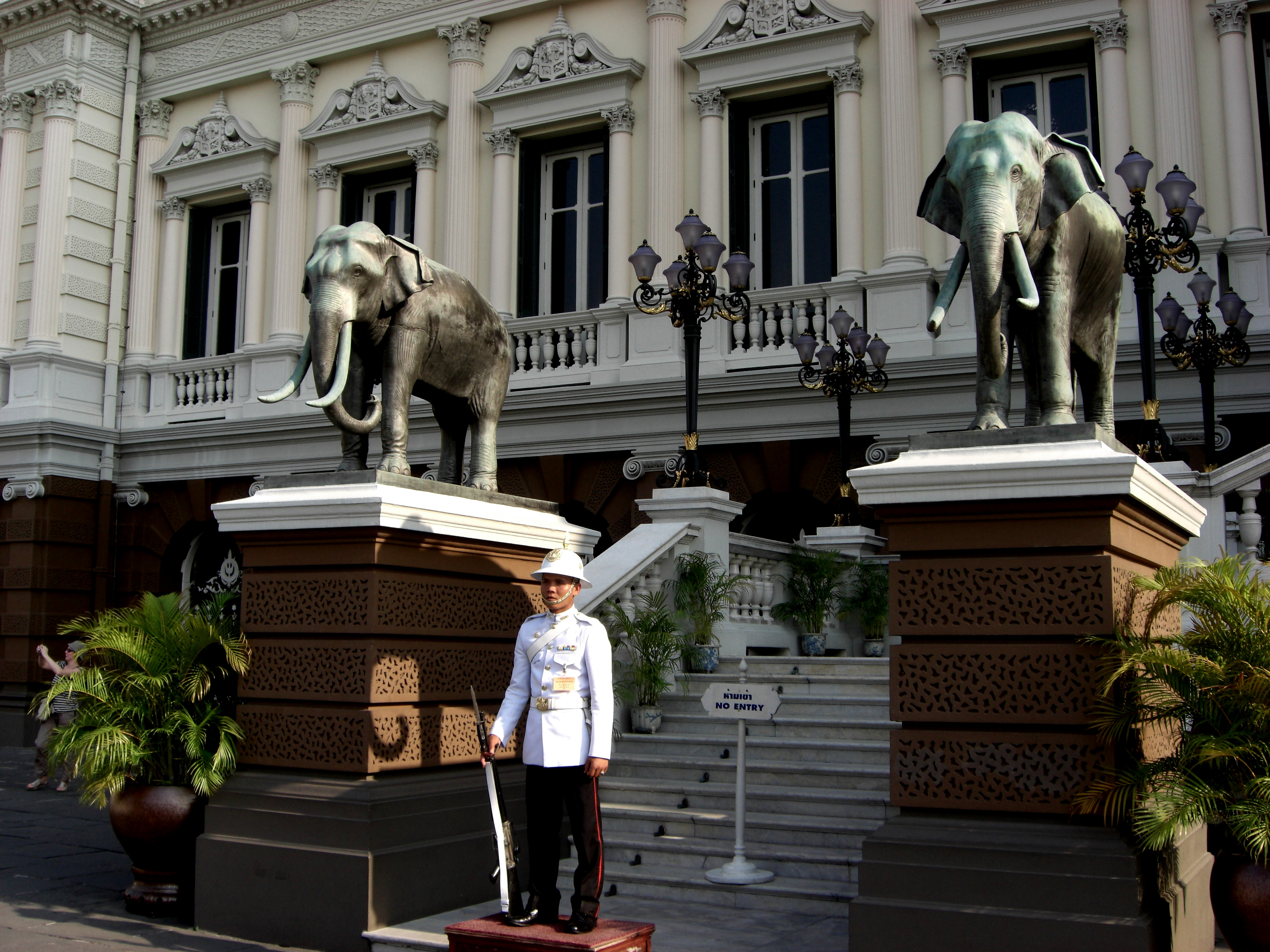
A Royal Guard at the gate of Chakri Maha Prasat Throne Hall, Grand Palace, Bangkok.

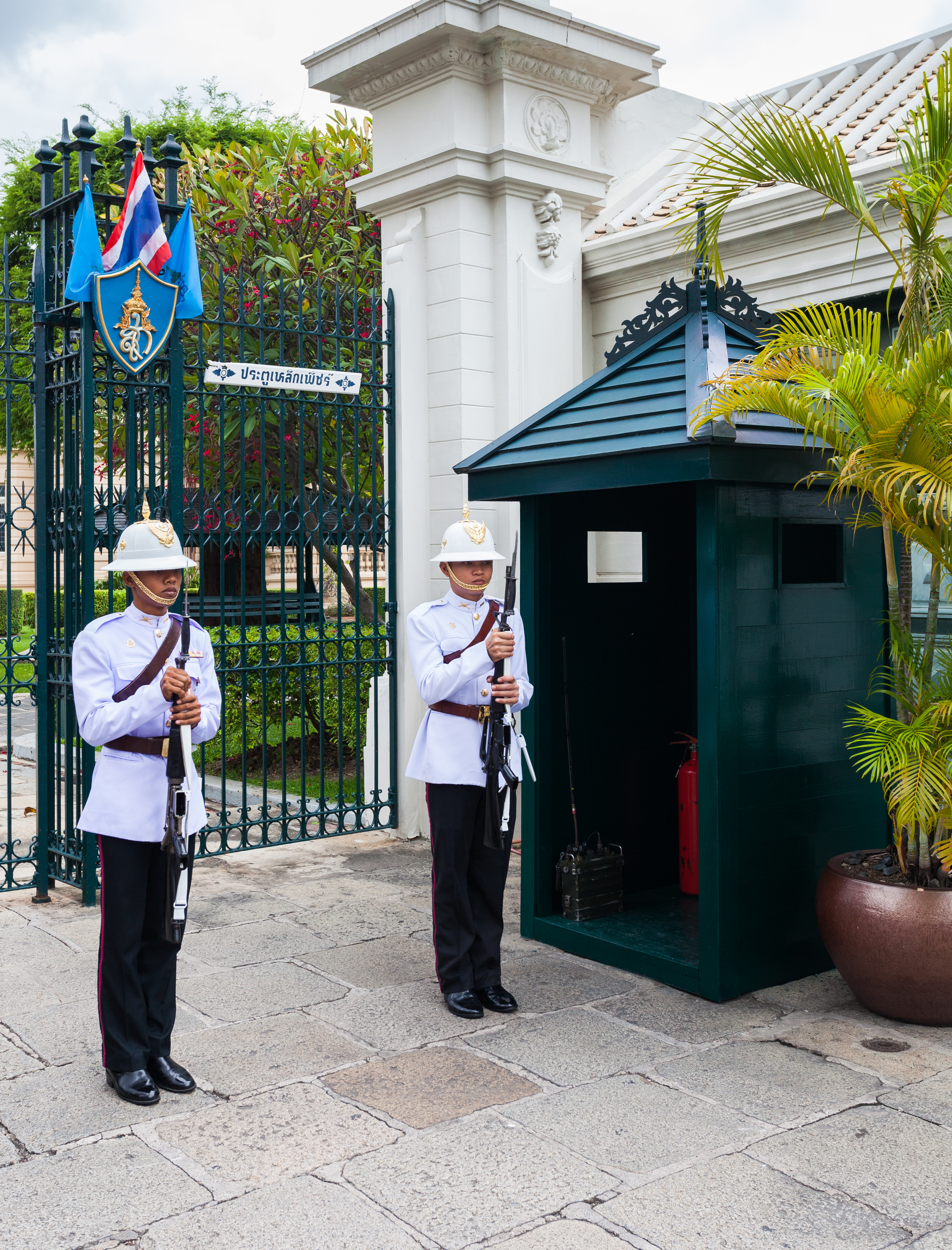
Changing of the guard of the 1st Infantry Regiment of the Royal Guard, Grand Palace, Bangkok

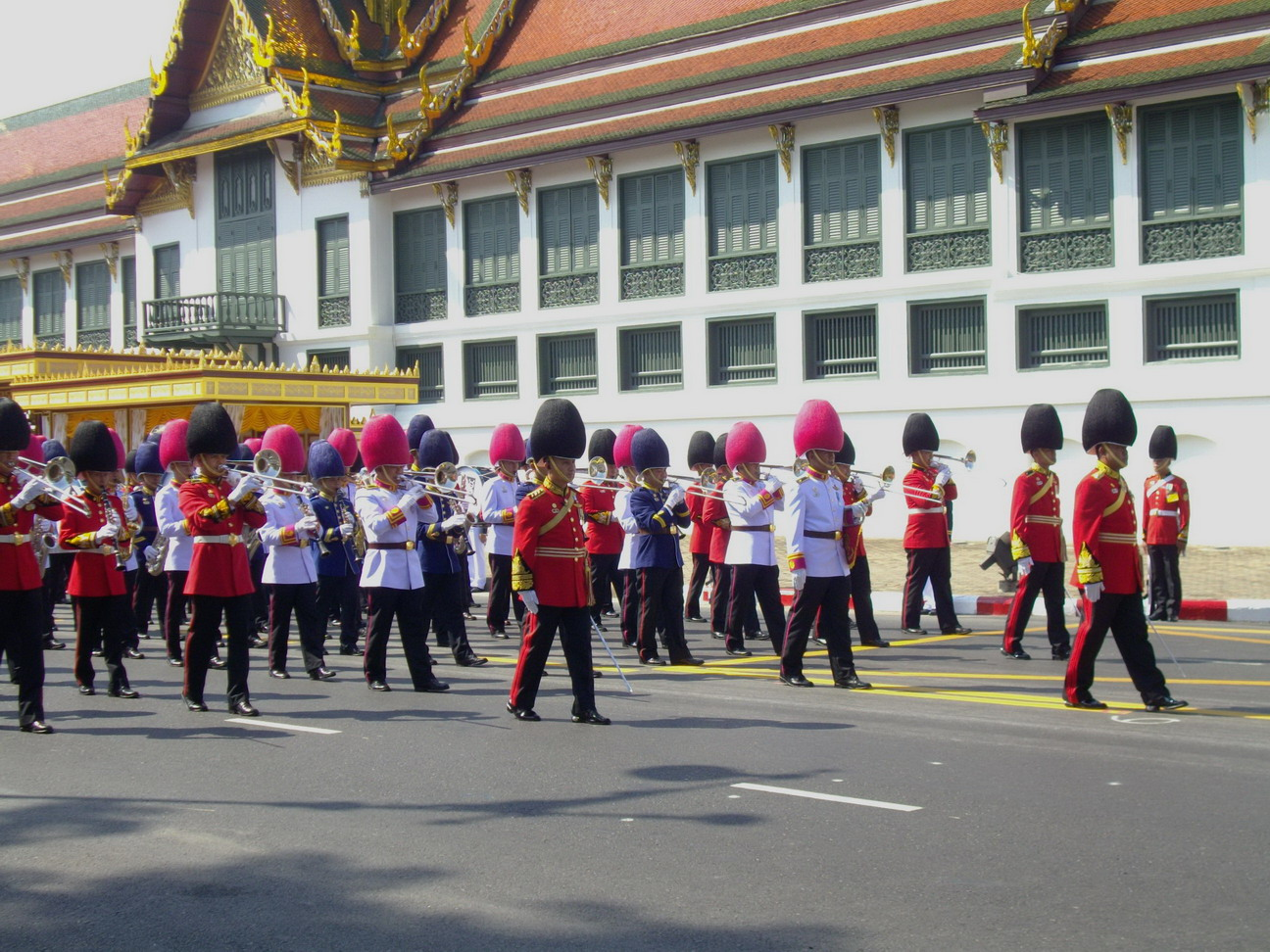
The Royal Thai Army Band in uniforms of various royal guards unit, ranked in the shape of the flag of Thailand

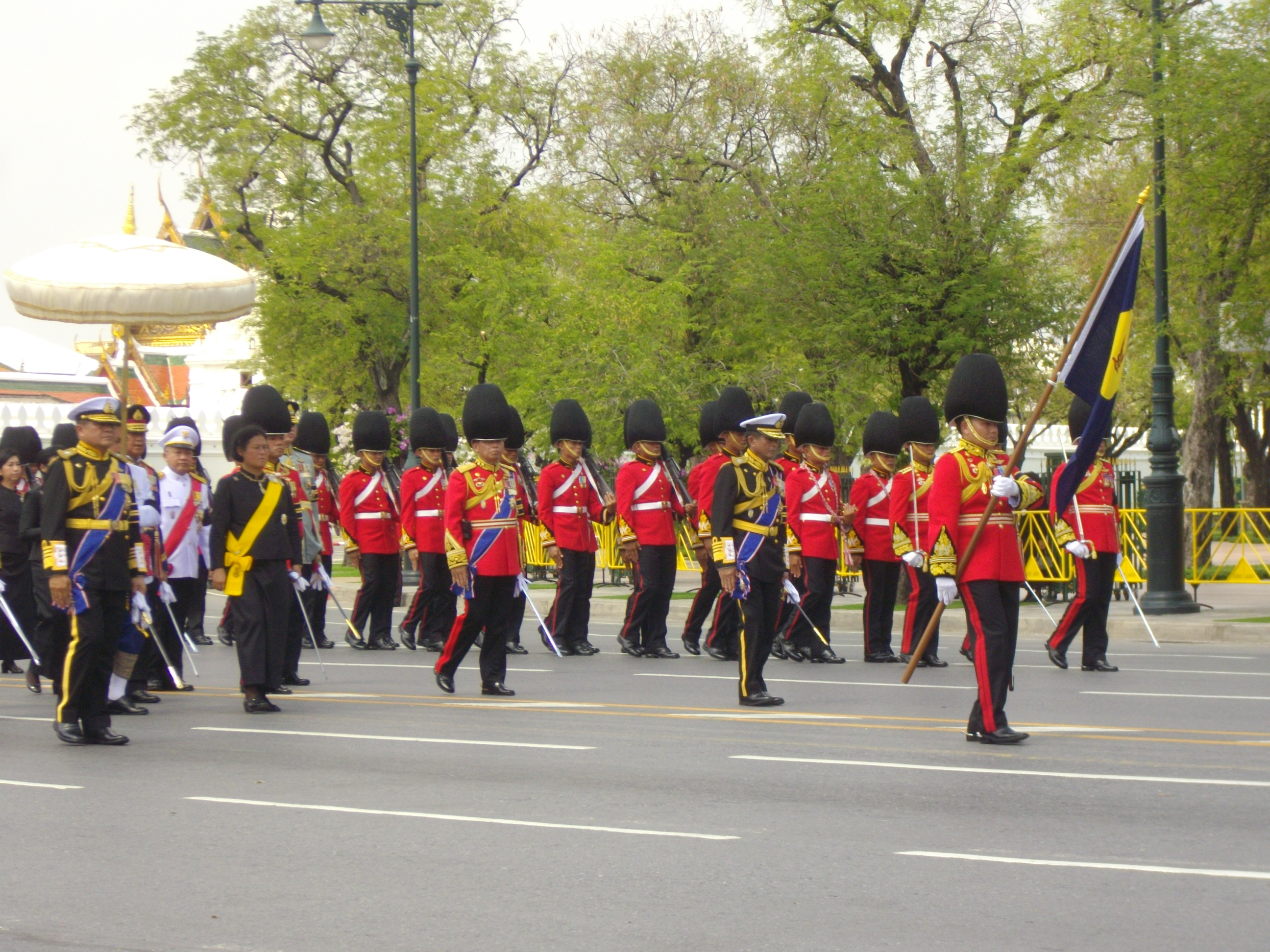
HRH Princess Sirindhorn with her royal guards, 2012.

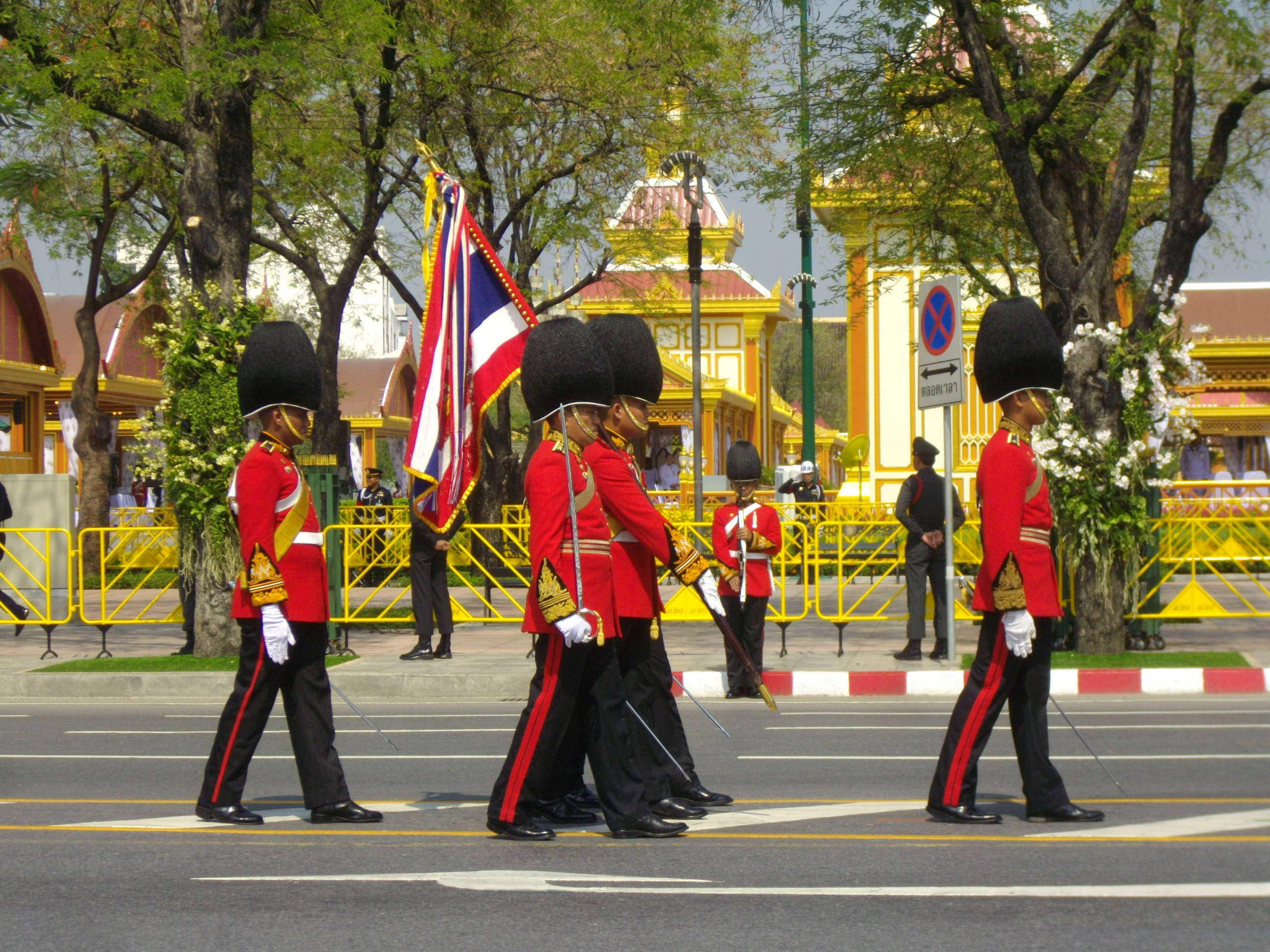
Colour guard of the 1st Infantry Regiment, King's Own Bodyguard

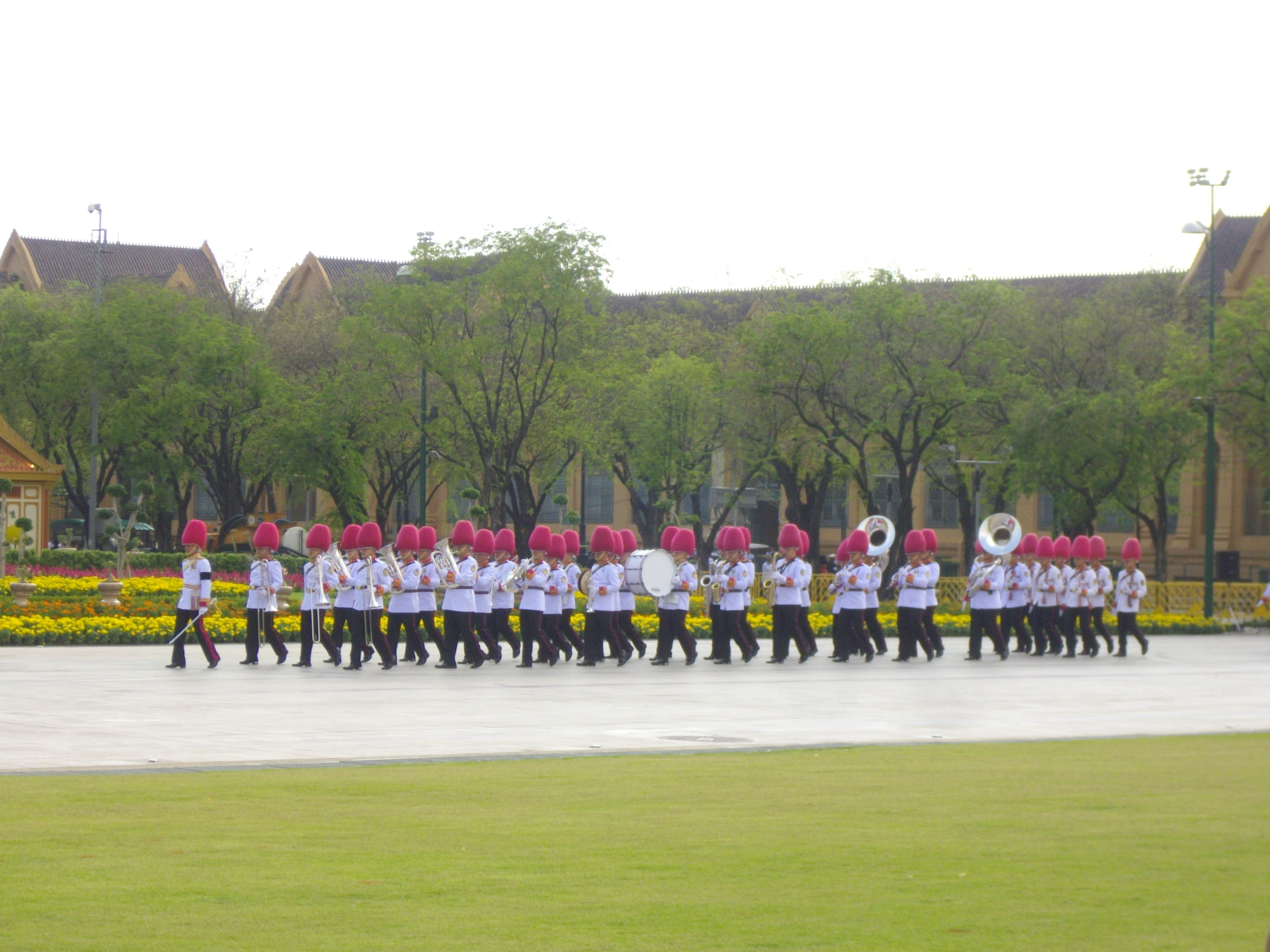
A Military Band of 3rd Infantry Battalion, 1st Infantry Regiment, King's Own Bodyguard

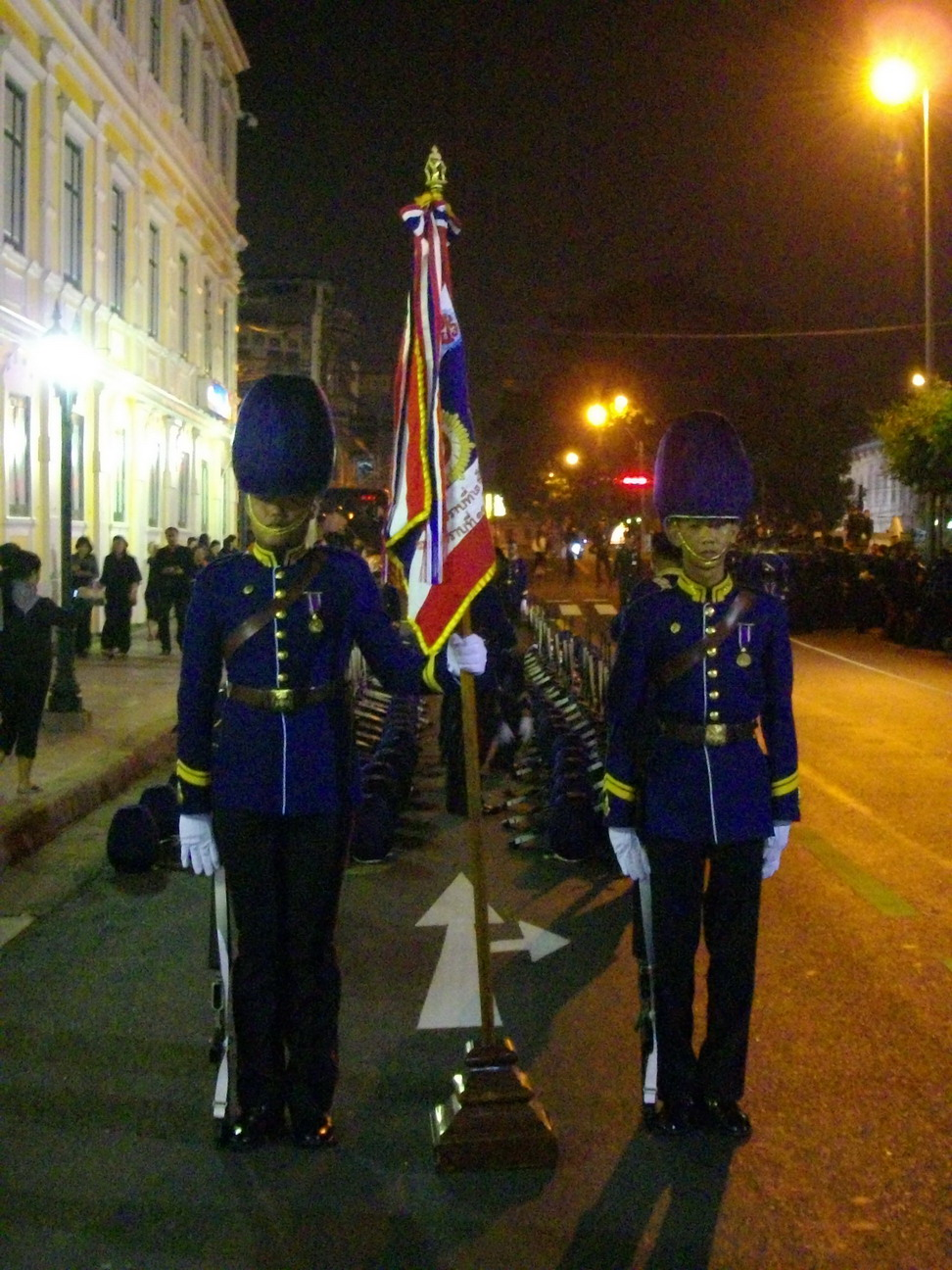
Colour guard of the 2nd Infantry Battalion, 11th Infantry Regiment, King's Guard

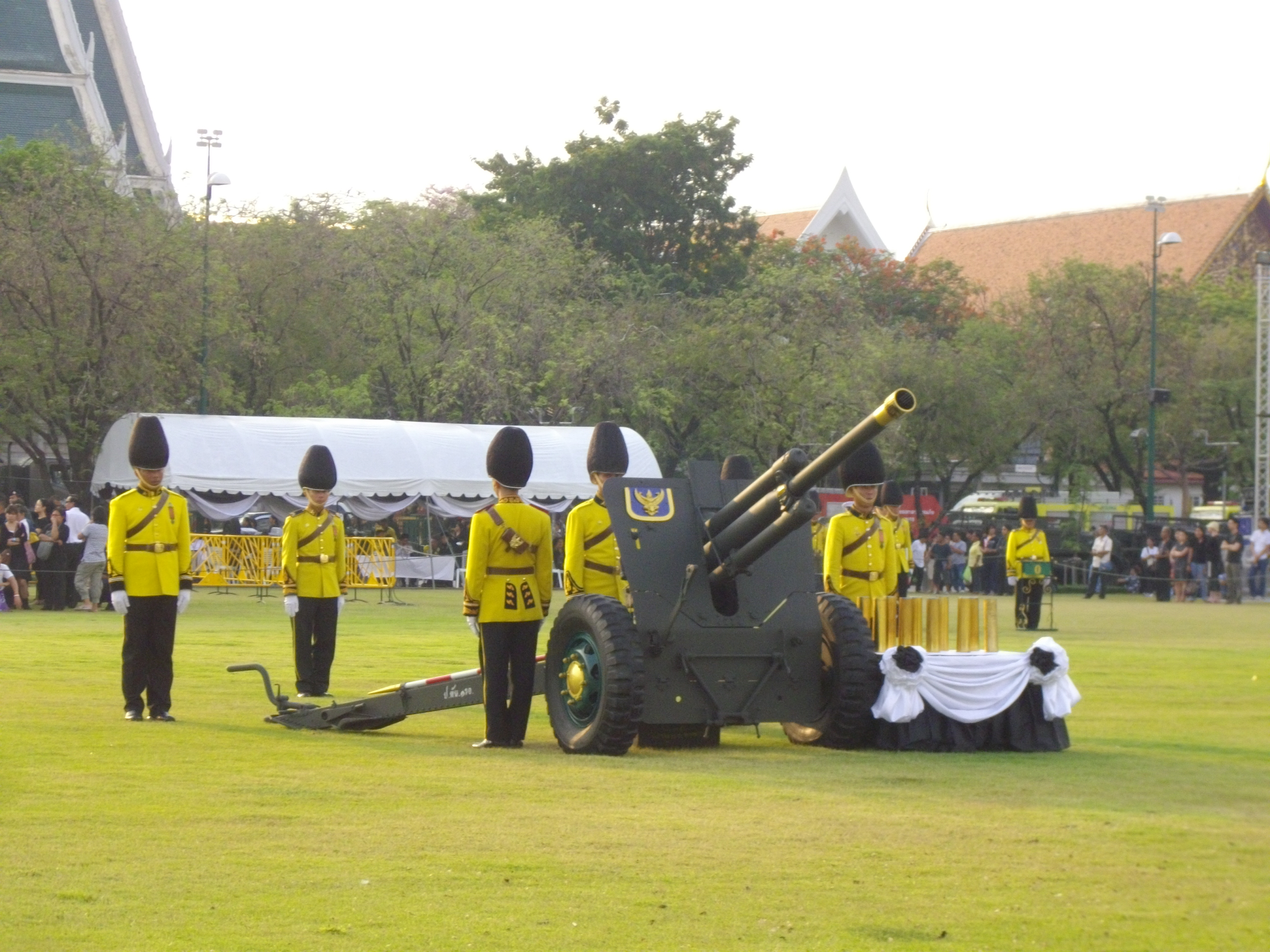
A company of the 1st Artillery Battalion prepared for a 21-gun salute in the royal cremation ceremony of Bejaratana Rajasuda, 2012.

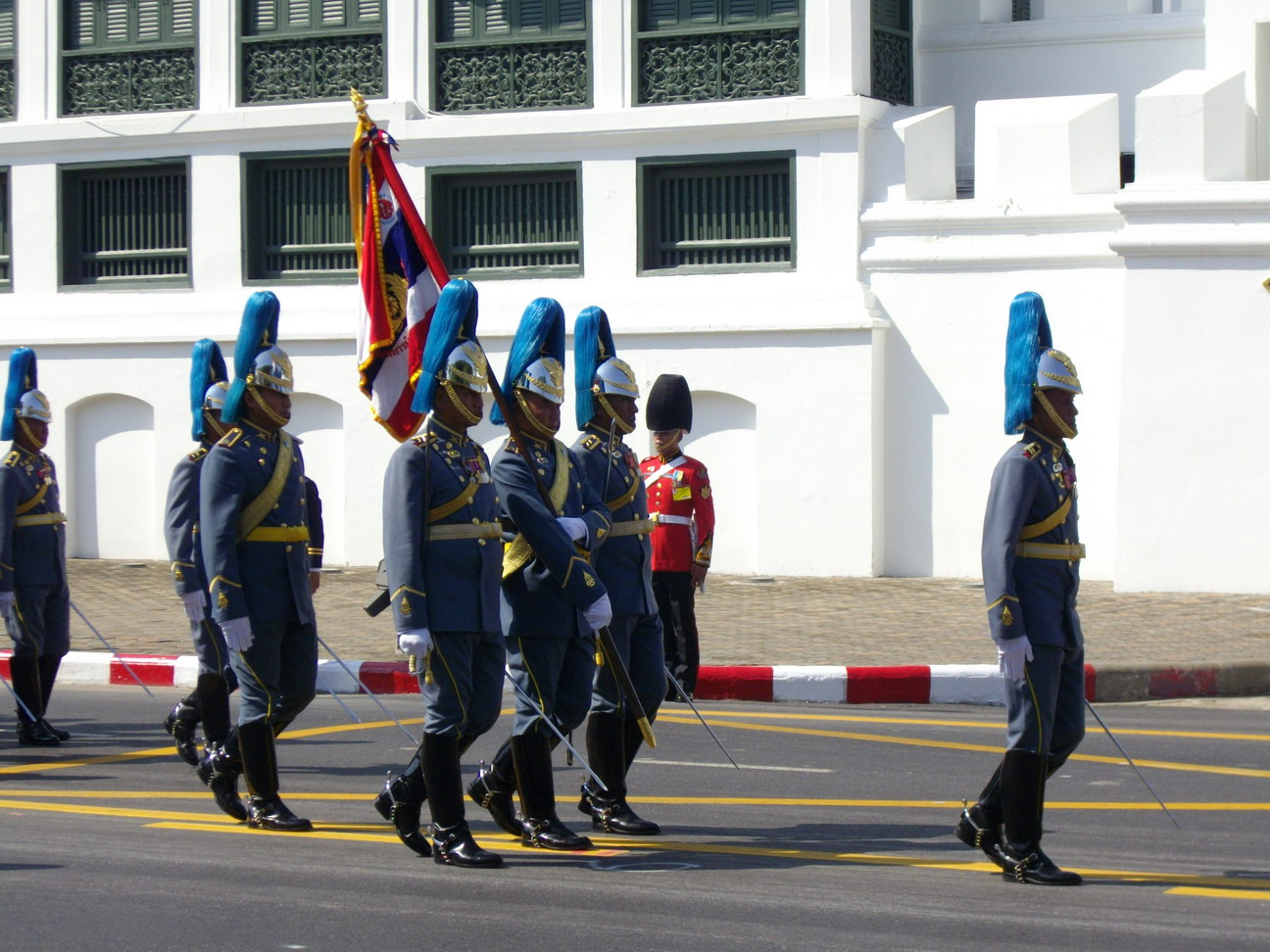
Colour guard of the 1st Cavalry Squadron, King's Guard

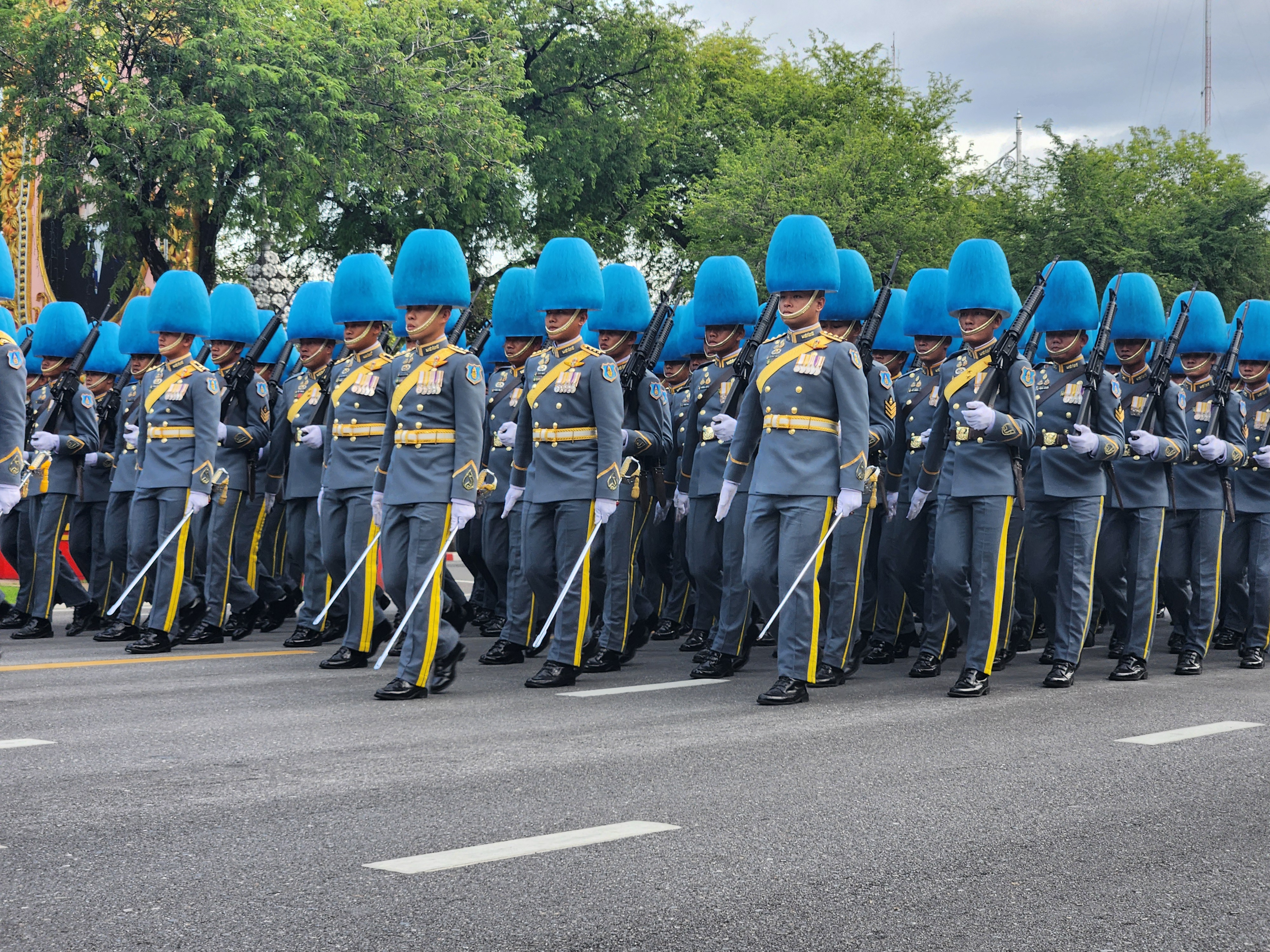
Troopers from 25th Cavalry Squadron, 4th Cavalry Regiment, Princess Srinagarindra's Guard

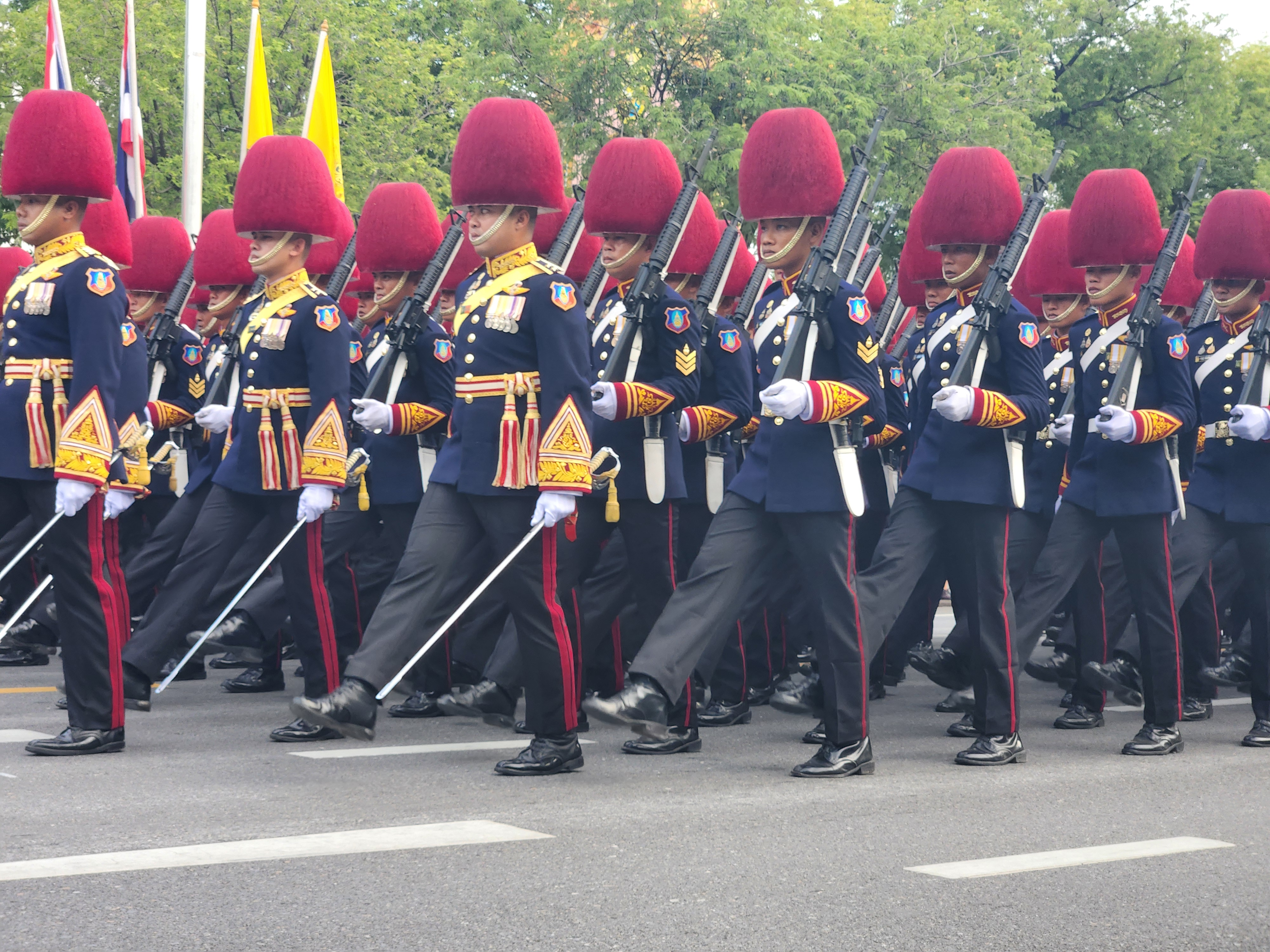
Troopers from 31st Infantry Regiment, King Bhumibol Adulyadej's Guard

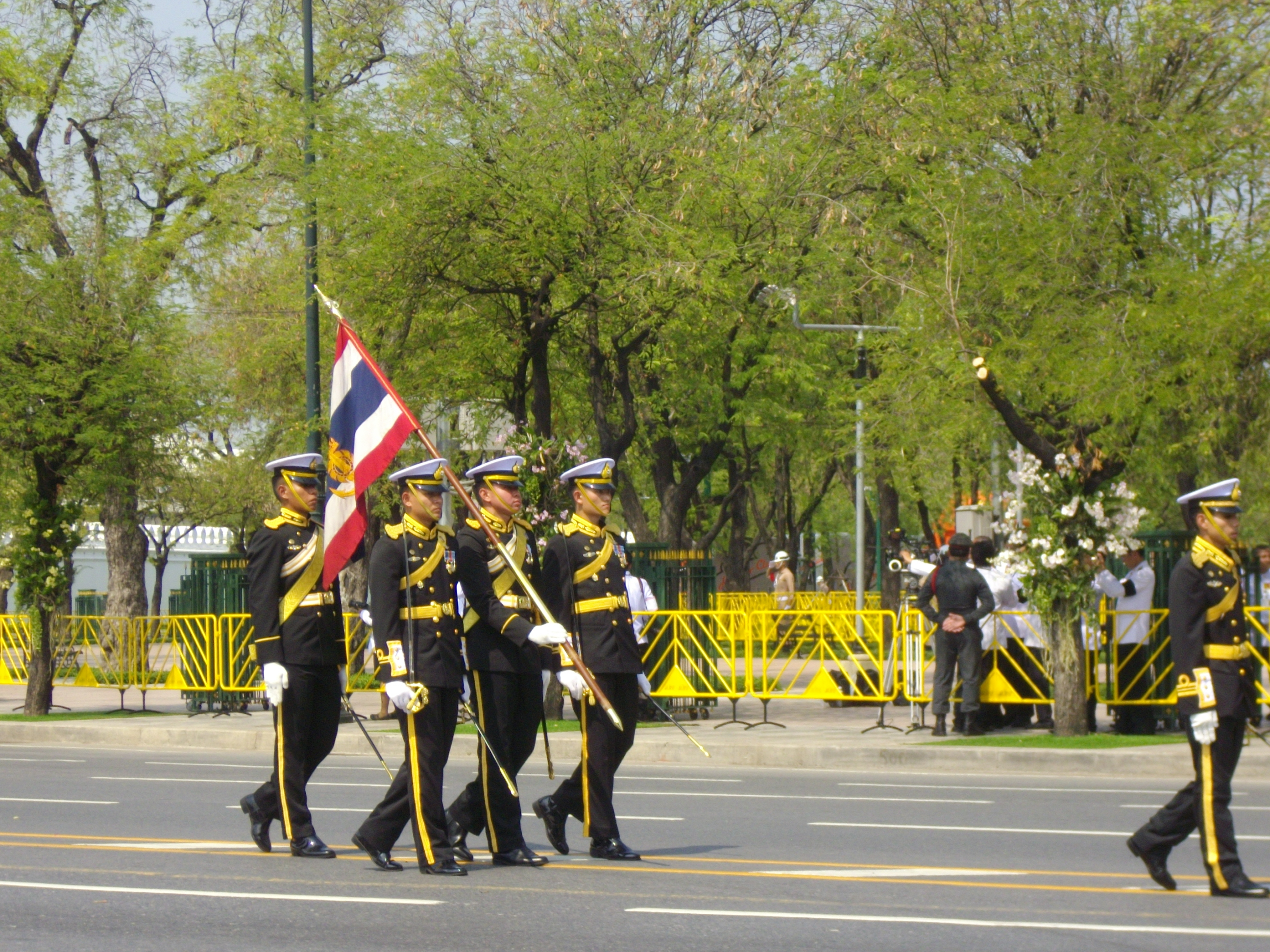
Colour guards of the Naval Cadet Regiment, King's Guard, Royal Thai Naval Academy

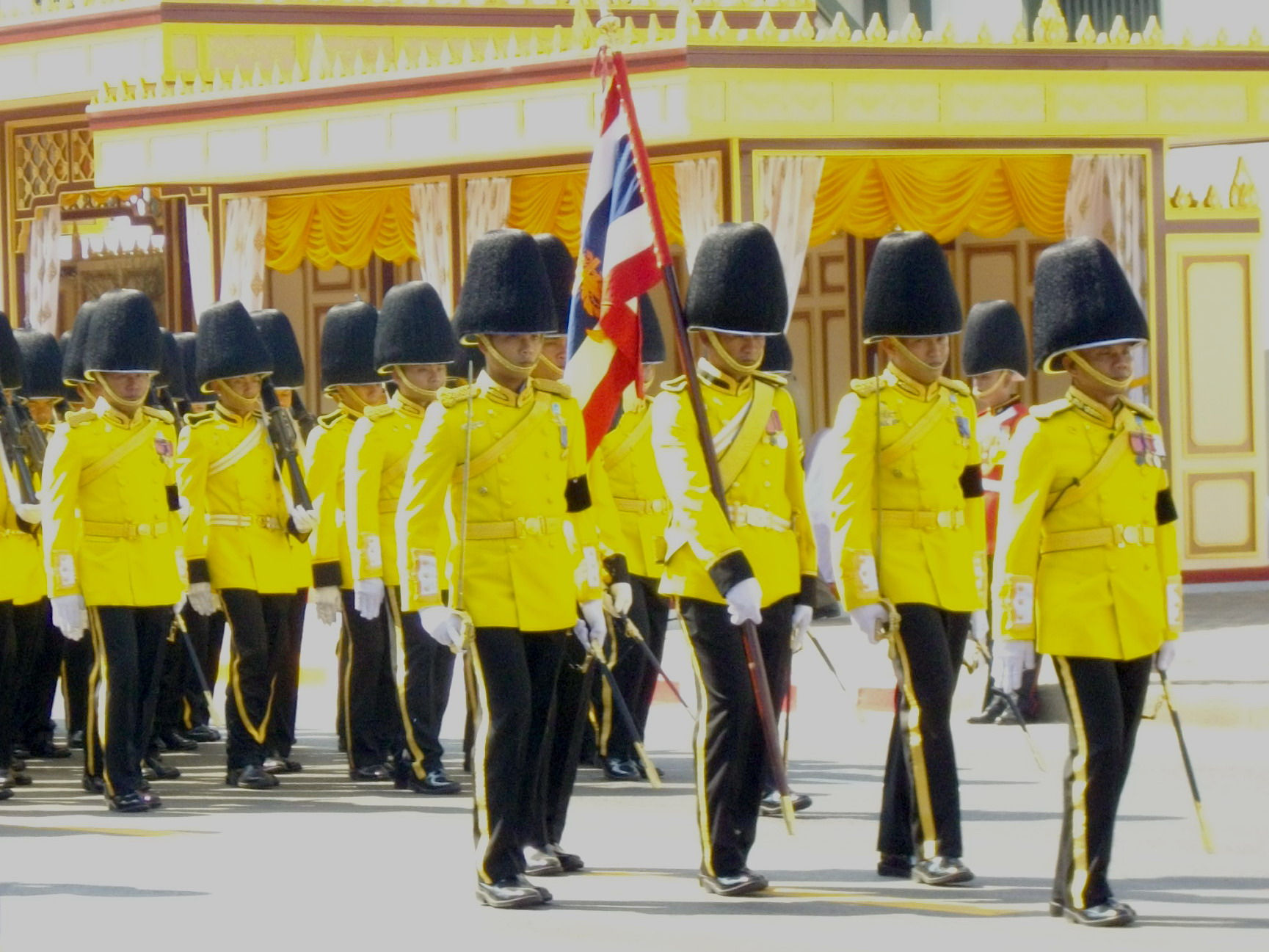
Colour guard of the 1st Marine Battalion, King's Guard, Royal Thai Navy

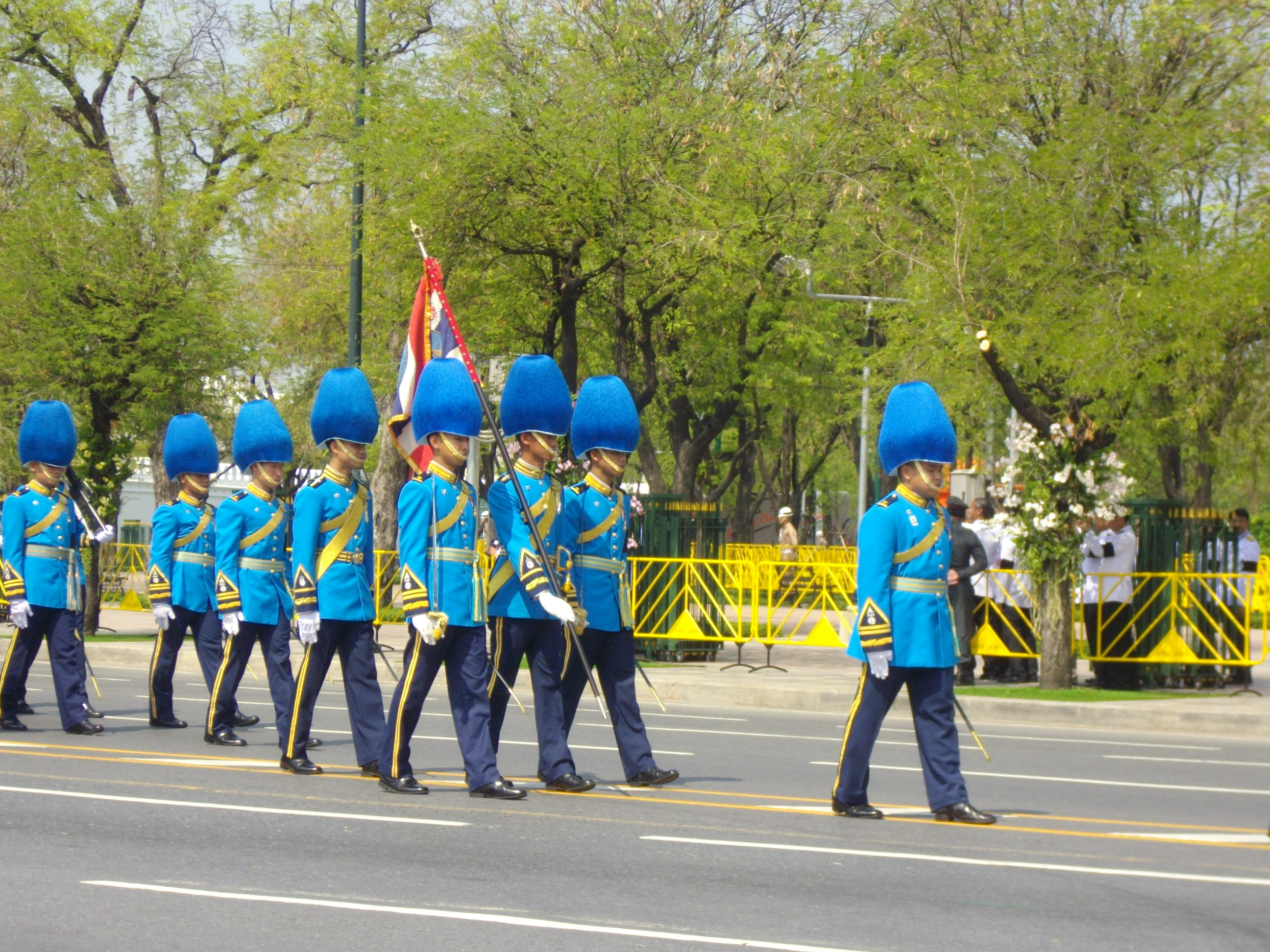
Colour guard of the Air Cadet Regiment, King's Guard, Royal Thai Air Force Academy

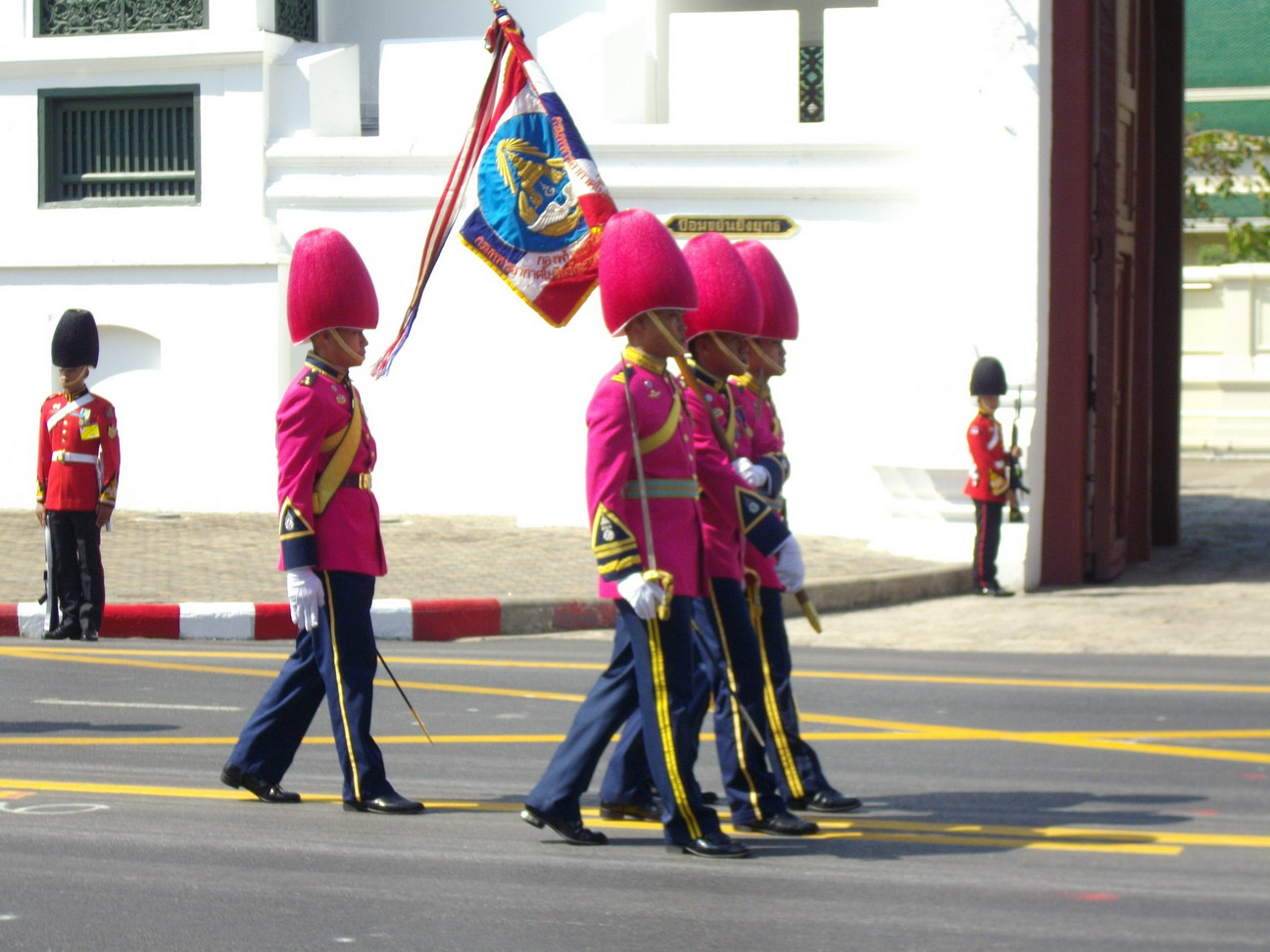
Colour guards of the 1st Security Force Battalion, King's Guard, Royal Thai Air Force

== See also ==
- Thai Royal Guards parade
- Monarchy of Thailand
- Royal Security Command
- Head of the Royal Thai Armed Forces
- List of army units called "guards"
