= Phud Vinichaikul =

Thai general

- Born: March 14, 1898; Bangkok, Thailand
- Died: June 11, 1964 (aged 65); Phuket, Thailand
- Military career
- Allegiance: Thailand
- Branch: Royal Thai Army
- Service years: 1909–1946
- Rank: Major-General
- Commands: 3rd Division
- Conflicts: Franco-Thai War; World War II
- Awards: Order of the Golden Kite

Phud Vinichaikul (also known as just Luang Kraichingrith) (Thai: พุด วินิจฉัยกุล ; March 14, 1899 – June 11, 1964) was a Major-General in the Thai Army Commissioner participated in the Franco-Thai War and Commanding 3rd Division occupation the northern part of Malaysia during Thai annexation of northern Malay states.
