= Thai Royal Guards parade =

The Thai Royal Guards parade, also known as Trooping the Colour, occurs every December 2 since 1953, in celebration of the birthday of the King of Thailand, during which the King's Guard of the Royal Thai Armed Forces perform a military parade and pledge loyalty to the monarch. The venue is the Royal Plaza at Bangkok, Thailand, in front of the Dusit Palace and its Ananta Samakhom Throne Hall.

== Introduction ==
All three branches of the armed forces take part in the parade, as seen in the composition of the Massed Military Bands, Bugle Squads and the Colour Parties of the 13 military units participating. The parade is notable for the colourful uniforms on display; pith helmets with heavy plumes resembling bearskins are worn, except for the lone cavalry unit in attendance - with British-style cavalry helmets and Thai lances on horsebacks - and the Naval Cadets. These uniforms are a nod to the British military traditions in the Royal Thai Armed Forces since the time of King Rama V (Chulalongkorn) in the final years of the 19th century, with a combination of the British and German military drill and ceremonial. The general public also attend the parade celebrations, and Thai television stations broadcast this to the entire nation.

Of the 13 participating battalions most are from the Royal Thai Army with two battalions, one each from the Royal Thai Navy and Royal Thai Marine Corps and another two battalions coming from the Royal Thai Air Force; all in full dress uniforms. Of all of them, most are active military units, the rest are military academies of the Royal Thai Armed Forces, represented by cadet battalions of the academies themselves led by their commandants.

The tradition started in 1953 by King Bhumibol Adulyadej (Rama IX), as a simple colours ceremony for the new colours of the 1st Infantry Regiment, King's Own Bodyguard and has now grown into a national military tradition through the years. Since 2009, however, Trooping the Colours is not held, however the oath taking part of the ceremony is retained, plus the ceremonial march-in and march-out of the troops and the Massed Bands, the Royal Salutes and the Royal 21-Gun Salute.

The parade itself came back in 2014 after a 5-year break, but this time before the King's birthday celebrations. After a 9 year break the National Day Royal Guards parade officially returned in 2024 in the full ceremonial last seen in 2008.

== History of the ceremonial parade ==
On Dec. 5, 1953, the 1st Inf. Regiment The King's Guards of the Royal Thai Army received their Colours from King Bhumibol Adulyadej, in his capacity as Head of the Royal Thai Armed Forces, in Bangkok, and trooped it in his presence, thus beginning this national military tradition. This has now grown from being a purely infantry activity to becoming an Armed Forces-wide celebration over the years, with the original unit now being joined by 12 other units representing the Royal Thai Armed Forces. They form the Thai counterpart to the British Household Division: 14 foot units and 1 to 2 mounted units parade past the royal family on that day, 3 from the military academies of the RTAF and the rest from units within the Armed Forces.

The difference now that the ones on parade are units designated as "King's Guards" by the King in his full constitutional duties as Head of the Royal Thai Armed Forces, from all its three branches and the Royal Security Command, drawn from personnel of the Army.

These units are as follows:

- 1st and 3rd Battalions, 1st Infantry Regiment, King's Own Bodyguard (a.k.a. "Ratchawanlop")
- 1st and 2nd Battalions, 11th Infantry Regiment, King's Bodyguard
- 1st and 2nd Battalions, 21st Infantry Regiment, Queen's Guard (a.k.a. "Thahan Suea Rachini")
- 31st Infantry Regiment, King's Guard (Airborne)
- 1st Cavalry Squadron, King's Guard
- 29th Cavalry Squadron, King's Guard
- 1st Field Artillery Regiment, King's Guard
- 1st Engineer Battalion, King's Guard
- 1st Marine Battalion, King's Guard (Royal Thai Marine Corps)
- Security Force Regiment, King's Guard (Royal Thai Air Force)
- 1st Battalion, Naval Cadet Regiment, King's Guard
- 1st Battalion, CRMA Cadet Regiment, King's Guard
- 1st Battalion, Air Cadet Regiment, King's Guard

The 1st Field Artillery Regiment, King's Guard's 1st Battalion Ceremonial Battery provides the ceremonial 21-gun salutes in all royal occasions, and also on the parade itself. The Parade's Field Officer is usually an appointment given to an experienced officer of the Army with the rank of Major General and the Regimental Staff is composed of officers from the units on parade, led by the Parade Brigade Major, which is the billet of a Colonel. In 2024, Queen Suthida became the parade's first ever female Field Officer.

=== Massed bands in attendance ===
The Massed Military Bands for the parade are made up of the following bands that mostly fall under the Royal Thai Army with one band under the Air Force:

- Band of the 1st Battalion, 1st Infantry Regiment, King's Own Close Bodyguard
- Band of the 3rd Battalion, 1st Infantry Regiment, King's Own Close Bodyguard
- Band of the 1st Battalion, 11th Infantry Regiment, King's Own Bodyguard
- Regimental Band of the Chulachomklao Royal Military Academy
- Band of the 2nd Battalion, 11th Infantry Regiment, King's Own Bodyguard
- Band of the 1st Battalion, 21st Infantry Regiment, Queen's Guard
- Band of the 1st Battalion, 31st Infantry Regiment, King's Guard
- Regimental Band of the Navaminda Kasatriyadhiraj Royal Thai Air Force Academy

The combined strength is about 180 bandsmen, led by the Senior Director of Music of the Bangkok Capital Garrison District, the billet of a field officer of the army.

=== Summary of the parade ===
- The 1st to 2nd Guards Regiments of 4 battalions each march first, forming the 1st Guards Brigade, the 2nd Brigade is formed of the 3rd-4th Regiments, and their massed bands - mostly under the Royal Thai Army - lead each column
- The Cavalry Squadron takes its post behind the infantry units
- The Colours then take post in quick time first and later in slow time towards the Field Officer and his staff
- Arrival of the King and Queen (or in their behalf, the Crown Prince, the Princess Royal or the Chief of Defense Forces, Thailand, if the former two are in the parade field Sansoen Phra Barami is played by the Massed Bands as a Royal Salute is rendered)
- Report of the Field Officer (only if the King and Queen are present)
- Parade inspection (if the Guards Division will be present during the birthday event itself or even before the day, the inspection is omitted)
- If they are present, the King (or in their behalf, the Crown Prince and/or the Princess Royal) will then step off the inspection vehicles and walk towards the Saluting Base in the Royal Plaza
- Military Oath of Loyalty to the King of Thailand and Commander in Chief of the Royal Armed Forces
- 1st Royal or General Salute (Especially if the King is present, Sansoen Phra Barami is played by the Massed Bands, w/ a 21-gun salute)
- Speech of Gratitude by the King or Message for the King to the Armed Forces and the Nation by the Chief of Defense Forces (if the King is absent the CDF leads the Oath of Loyalty after his message)
- 2nd Royal or General Salute
- Colors return to their battalions in quick time
- Parade forms up for the march pass in review in quick time or the march out

If the King is only present, the following then follow:

- A bugler sounds the Attention Call twice.
- The Field Officer orders the parade: "Fix bayonets!" and all the Guards battalions fix their bayonets, the cavalry excluded.
- The FO orders the left turn as the 3rd and 4th regiments, composing the 2nd Brigade, are ordered later for an about turn and to take post, if needed, several paces away from the 1st Brigade.
- The FO orders the parade to slope arms, followed by a bugler sounding the call to march past.
- To the tune of the "Royal Guards March", the parade marches past in quick time, with the crowd assembled standing and bowing whenever the Victory Colours are marched past the saluting base.
- As the march past in quick time ends and as the music changes to the King Cotton March by the Massed Bands, the cavalry troop trots past the saluting base.
- The band then takes position in the saluting base to play a song especially composed for the King, and then returns to its position in the line
- Following the return of the Massed Bands, the parade renders one final Royal Salute as the King and Queen and the whole of the royal party depart

== See also ==
- King's Guard (Thailand)
- Trooping the Colour (United Kingdom)
- Royal Thai Armed Forces
- Head of the Royal Thai Armed Forces
