= 31st Infantry Regiment (Thailand) =

Royal Thai Army unit

31st Infantry Regiment, King Guard
- กรมทหารราบที่ 31 รักษาพระองค์ ในพระบาทสมเด็จพระบรมชนกาธิเบศร มหาภูมิพลอดุลยเดชมหาราช บรมนาถบพิตร
- Emblem of the 31st Infantry Regiment, King Bhumibol's Guard
- Active: 31st Infantry Regiment, King Guard (1980 – present); 31st Infantry Regiment, 1st Division, King's Guard (1979 – 80); 31st Combined Regiment, 1st Division, King's Guard (1976 – 79); 31st Combined Regiment (1955 – 76)
- Country: Thailand
- Allegiance: HM The King of Thailand
- Branch: Royal Thai Army
- Type: Airborne forces King's Guard; Rapid deployment force
- Size: Regiment
- Part of: 1st Division, King's Guard
- Garrison/HQ: Thanon Yai, Mueang Lopburi district, Lopburi
- Nicknames: กองพันทหารเสือ (Musketeer battalion) กองพันมรณะ (Battalion of death)
- Motto: ยอมตายดีกว่าเป็นทาส "Death is better than be slave."
- Engagements: Cold War; Vietnam War; Communist insurgency in Thailand; Vietnamese border raids in Thailand; Thai–Laotian Border War; 1999 East Timorese crisis; International Force East Timor; Operation Pochentong; South Thailand insurgency; Cambodian–Thai border dispute; 2008–2011 Cambodia–Thailand border crisis; 2025 Cambodia–Thailand conflict
- Decorations: Bravery Medal (1st & 2nd Battalion)
- Website: www.rdf31.com

The 31st Infantry Regiment, King Bhumibol's Guard (Thai: กรมทหารราบที่ 31 รักษาพระองค์ ในพระบาทสมเด็จพระบรมชนกาธิเบศร มหาภูมิพลอดุลยเดชมหาราช บรมนาถบพิตร) is an airborne force and rapid deployment force (RDF)'s King's Guard regiment of the 1st Division, King's Guard of the Royal Thai Army (RTA). Established in 1955, the regiment comprises highly trained paratroopers with armoured cavalry capabilities. However, it is not classified as a special forces or special operations forces. Except for the pathfinder unit in the 1st Infantry Battalion, it was organized as a special operations capable forces unit with special reconnaissance capabilities in preparation for airborne operations.

The original composition of this regiment consisted of three battalions: 1st Infantry Battalion serves as the airborne forces battalion spearheading RDF operations, while the other two function as light infantry. Based in Lopburi, the regiment carries the prestigious title “King Bhumibol Adulyadej's Guards,” a tribute to its honored role in protecting the monarchy.

== History ==
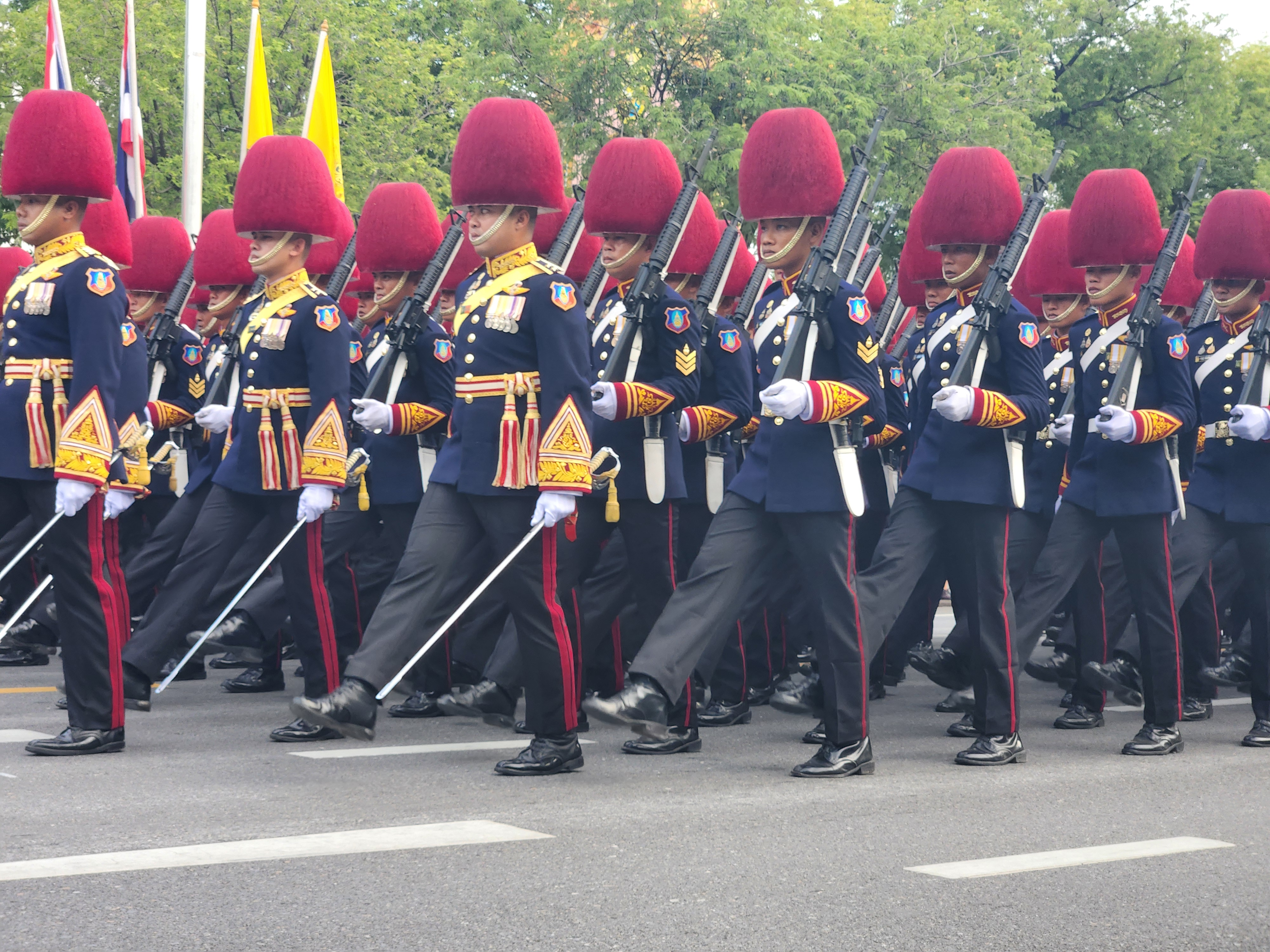
Ceremonial full dress uniform of 31st Infantry Regiment

The 31st Infantry Regiment, King Bhumibol's Guard, traces its origins to 10 November 1955, when it was established as the 31st Combined Regiment (กรมผสมที่ 31). It became part of the 1st Division in 1956. The regiment's transformation into an airborne force began in 1969, with the 1st Battalion converting into a paratrooper unit, followed by the other battalions soon after.

In 1976, the regiment was elevated to King's Guard unit status, leading to its renaming as the 31st Infantry Regiment, King’s Guard in 1979. A year later, in 1980, it was further honored with the title "King Bhumibol Adulyadej’s Own Guards."

The regiment’s paratroopers, known as the 31st IR (Para), are distinguished by their scarlet plumes on bearskin caps during ceremonial parades in full dress uniform.

== Organization ==
The 31st Infantry Regiment, King Bhumibol's Guard is a regiment-level unit of the regular army divided into three infantry battalions sized, three companies sized departments operational forces, and the one HQ company.

- 31st Infantry Regiment, King Bhumibol's Guard (since 2018 until now)
  - Headquarter (HQ)
    - Armoured Cavalry Company
    - Headquarter Company
    - Heavy Mortar Company
    - Reconnaissance and Surveillance Company
    - 1st Infantry Battalion, 31st Infantry Regiment, King Bhumibol's Guard (Only airborne forces and heliborne forces)
    - 2nd Infantry Battalion, 31st Infantry Regiment, King Bhumibol's Guard (Light infantry)
    - 3rd Infantry Battalion, 31st Infantry Regiment, King Bhumibol's Guard (Light infantry)

== Missions ==
- Air assault and airborne operations in the event of an emergency requiring military force as a rapid deployment force (RDF).
- Military training, researchs, and development to respond and adapt to modern warfare.
- Operations to seize important military strategic locations before passing on the responsibility to subsequent combat units.
- Preparing forces and readiness to deal with situations that exceed the capabilities of army border defense units.
- Protection of the Thai Royal Family.
- Supporting assistance to people affected by natural disasters.
- Supporting Royal Initiative Project.
