= Thailand in the Vietnam War =

- Part of the Vietnam War
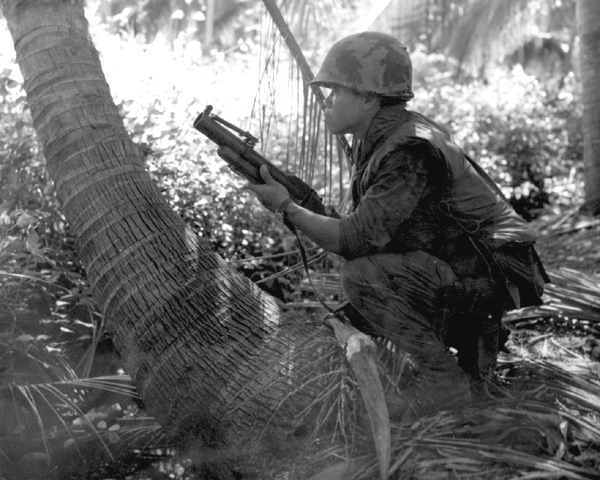
- Queen's Cobras M79 grenadier in Phuoc Tho in 1967
- Type: War
- Location: Republic of Vietnam
- Objective: To support South Vietnam against Communist attacks
- Date: 1967 – 1972
- Casualties: 351 killed 1,358 injured

The Kingdom of Thailand, under the administration of military dictator Field Marshal Thanom Kittikachorn, took an active role in the Vietnam War. Thailand was the third-largest provider of ground forces to South Vietnam, following the Americans and South Koreans.

Due to its proximity to Thailand, Vietnam's conflicts were closely monitored by Bangkok. Thai involvement did not become official until the total involvement of the United States in support of South Vietnam in 1964. The Thai government then allowed the United States Air Force in Thailand to use its air and naval bases. At the height of the war, almost 50,000 American military personnel were stationed in Thailand, mainly airmen.

== Deployment of forces to South Vietnam ==
Seal of Royal Thai Army Expeditionary Division

On 29 September 1964 a 16-man Royal Thai Air Force (RTAF) contingent arrived in Vietnam to assist in flying and maintaining some of the cargo aircraft operated by the Republic of Vietnam Air Force (RVNAF). On 22 July 1966 a 21-man RTAF contingent qualified on the C-123 became operational and were attached to the United States Air Force (USAF) 315th Air Commando Wing, while 5 men remained with the RVNAF where they were assigned to fly C-47 aircraft.

In October 1967 the Royal Thai Volunteer Regiment (Queen's Cobras) was sent to Camp Bearcat at Bien Hoa, to fight alongside the Americans, Australians, New Zealanders and South Vietnamese. In 1968 the Cobras were replaced by the Royal Thai Army Expeditionary Division (Black Panthers). About 40,000 Thai military would serve in South Vietnam, with 351 killed in action and 1,358 wounded.

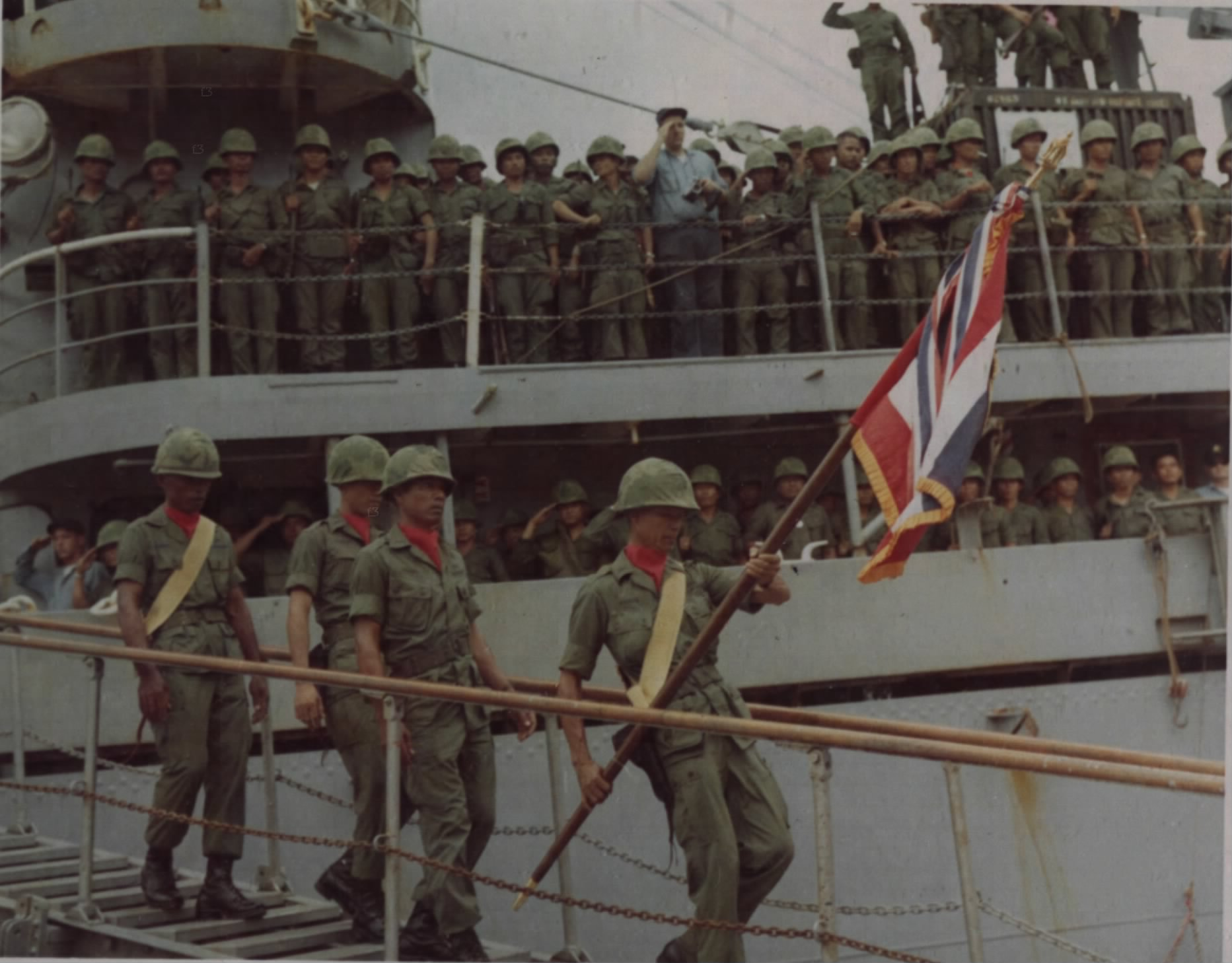
Black Panther Division colors come off USS Okanogan, Newport, 29 July 1968

Thai morale was generally high, with Thai troops taking pride in their roles as "defenders of Thailand from communism" and as Buddhists. Thai forces were generally respected by their American allies and inflicted on their PAVN opponents several times the losses they took; Thai media would often report on the war in terms of enemy killed, similar to American media. One state newspaper during the war had the headline "In 150 Fights, 100 [Thais] Are Dead, 1,000 Viet Cong Are Killed."

The RTAF contingent achieved its greatest strength in late 1970. The total number of Thais serving with the Victory Flight, as their Vietnam transport operation was designated, had grown from 21 to 45. 3 pilots and 5 flight engineers flew RVNAF C-47s with the 415th Squadron; 9 pilots, 7 flight engineers and 3 load masters were flying C-123Ks with the USAF 19th Tactical Airlift Squadron both located at Tan Son Nhut Air Base. The remaining members of the flight had jobs on the ground in intelligence, communications, flight engineering, loading and operations.

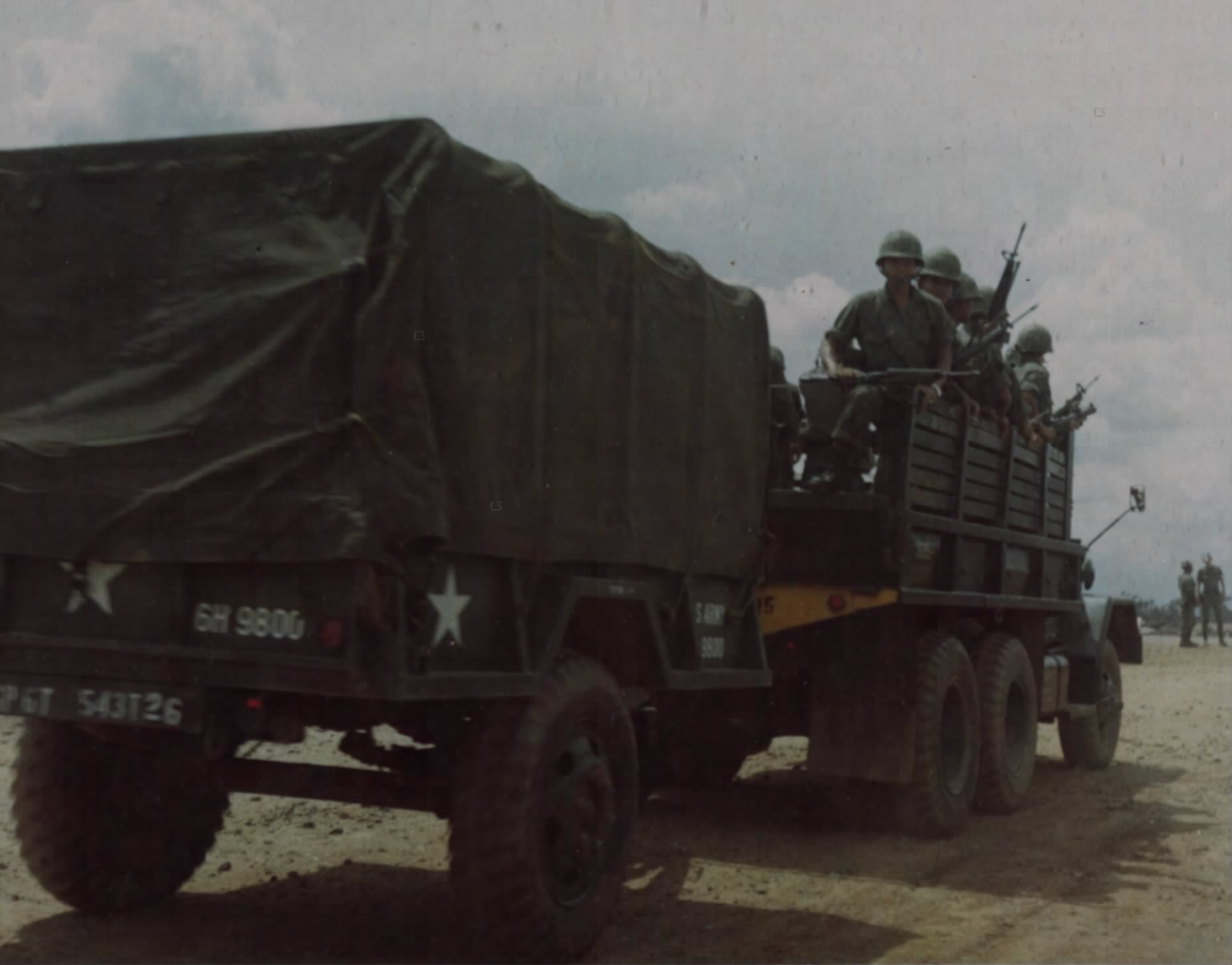
Members of Black Panther Division, loaded onto 2 1/2-ton trucks, roll through the gate of the US Army Terminal at Newport Docks en route to Bearcat, 22 July 1968

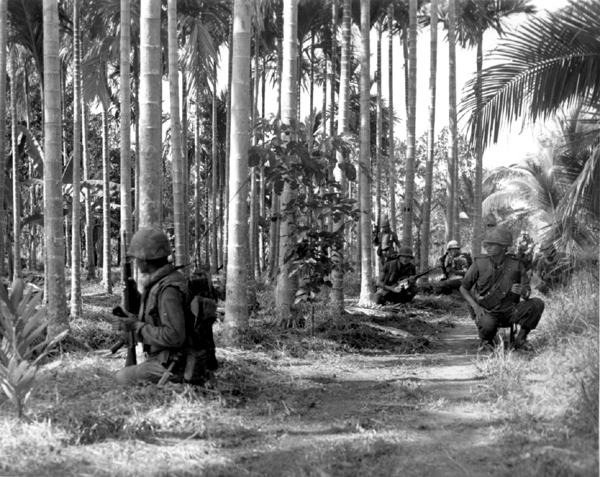
The Thai Queen's Cobra battalion in Phuoc Tho

In December 1969 the effects of the withdrawal of the Philippine Civic Action Group, Vietnam, and antiwar sentiment in the US were felt in Thailand as elsewhere. The United States had welcomed the decision of the Thai government to contribute troops to South Vietnam and was willing to compensate it by logistical support and payment of certain allowances to Thai forces for duty out of the country. These facts led to charges and countercharges regarding the expenditures of funds supporting the Thai division. On 19 December the Bangkok press reported that some twenty government party members of the Thai parliament had signed a letter to the prime minister urging the withdrawal of Thai troops from South Vietnam. The reasons given were that the situation in South Vietnam had improved as a result of the Vietnamization program and other aid as evidenced by U.S. cutbacks, and that difficult domestic economic and security problems existed in Thailand. No reference was made to the "mercenary" and "subsidy" charges of the previous few days. On 21 December Thai Foreign Minister Thanat Khoman told newsmen that he had considered the withdrawal of Thai troops "because the United States recently issued another announcement regarding further withdrawals." He also stated that the subject had been discussed with South Vietnamese Foreign Minister Tran Chan Thanh, and had been under consideration for some time. Two days later there was an apparent reversal of policy. After a cabinet meeting aimed at developing a unified position, the deputy prime minister announced: "Thailand will not pull any of her fighting men out of South Vietnam... Thailand has never contemplated such a move... The operation of Thai troops in South Vietnam is considered more advantageous than withdrawing them. If we plan to withdraw, we would have to consult with GVN since we sent troops there in response to an appeal from them. It is true that several countries are withdrawing troops from South Vietnam but our case is different."

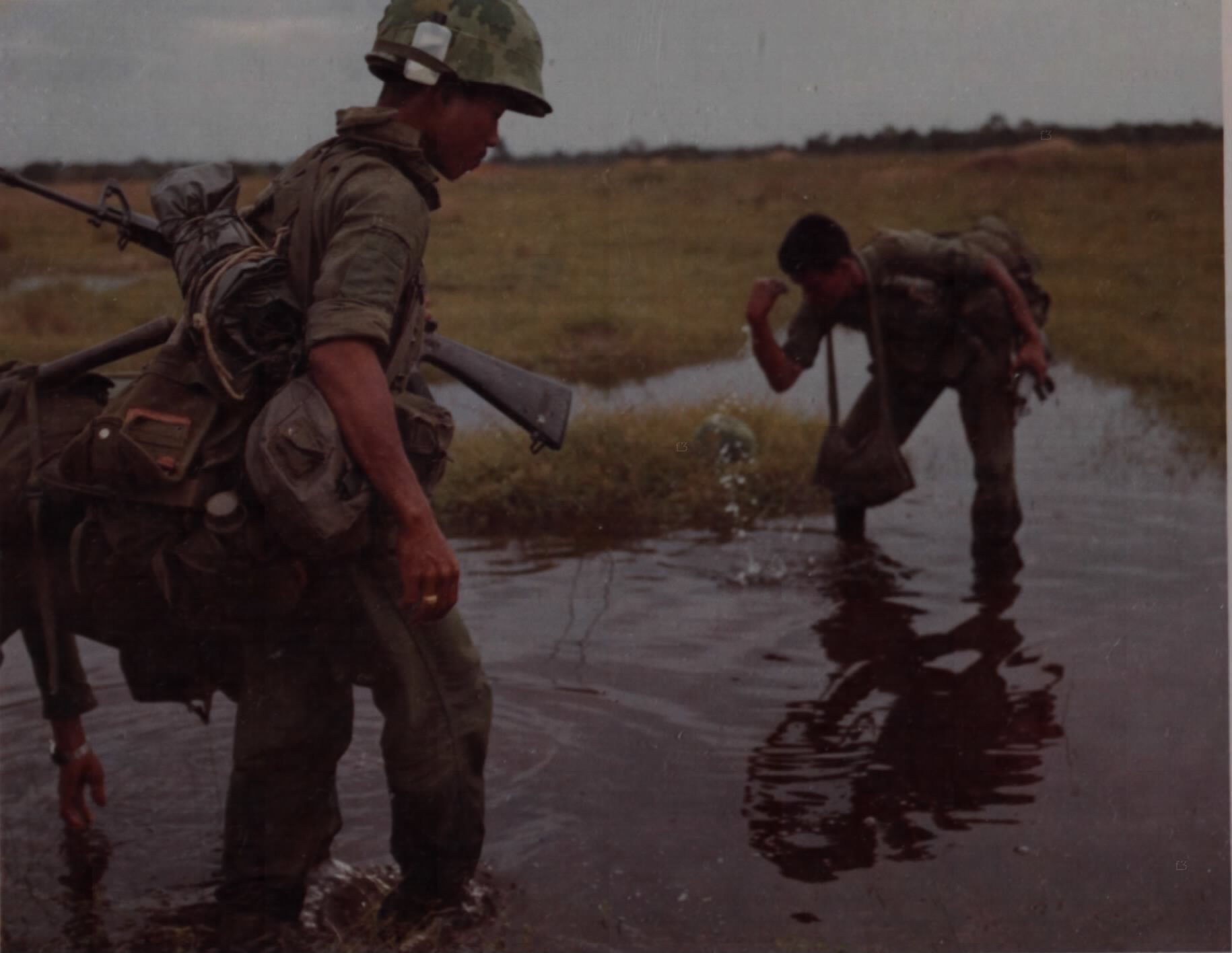
Thai soldiers wash in a small pool during a break in operations, Nhon Trac, 19 October 1967

The subject of a Thai troop withdrawal came up again in March 1970. In a meeting with the U.S. Ambassador, the Thai Prime Minister indicated that in light of continued U.S. and allied reductions, there was considerable pressure from the Thai parliament to withdraw. He stated that "When the people feel very strongly about a situation, the government must do something to ease the situation." Little occurred until the following November when the Thai government announced it was planning to withdraw its forces from South Vietnam by 1972. The decision was related to the deterioration of security in Laos and Cambodia and the growth of internal insurgency in Thailand, as well as the U.S. pullback.

The withdrawal plans were based on a rotational phase-out. The fifth increment would not be replaced after its return to Thailand in August 1971. The sixth increment would deploy as planned in January 1971 and withdraw one year later to complete the redeployment. Thai Navy and Air Force units would withdraw sometime before January 1972. The composition of the remaining residual force would be taken up in Thai-South Vietnamese discussions held later. A token Thai force of a non-combatant nature was under consideration. The withdrawal plans were confirmed and even elaborated upon through a Royal Thai government announcement to the United States and South Vietnam on 26 March 1971. The Thais proposed that half of the Black Panther Division be withdrawn in July 1971, and the remaining half in February 1972; this plan was in line with their earlier proposals. The three LST's Landing Ship, Tank (LSTs) of the Sea Horse unit would be withdrawn in April 1972 and Victory Flight would be pulled out by increments during the period April–December 1971. After July 1971 the Headquarters, Royal Thai Forces, Vietnam, would be reduced to 204 men. It would remain at that strength until its withdrawal in April 1972, after which only a token force would remain.

== US use of Thai air bases ==
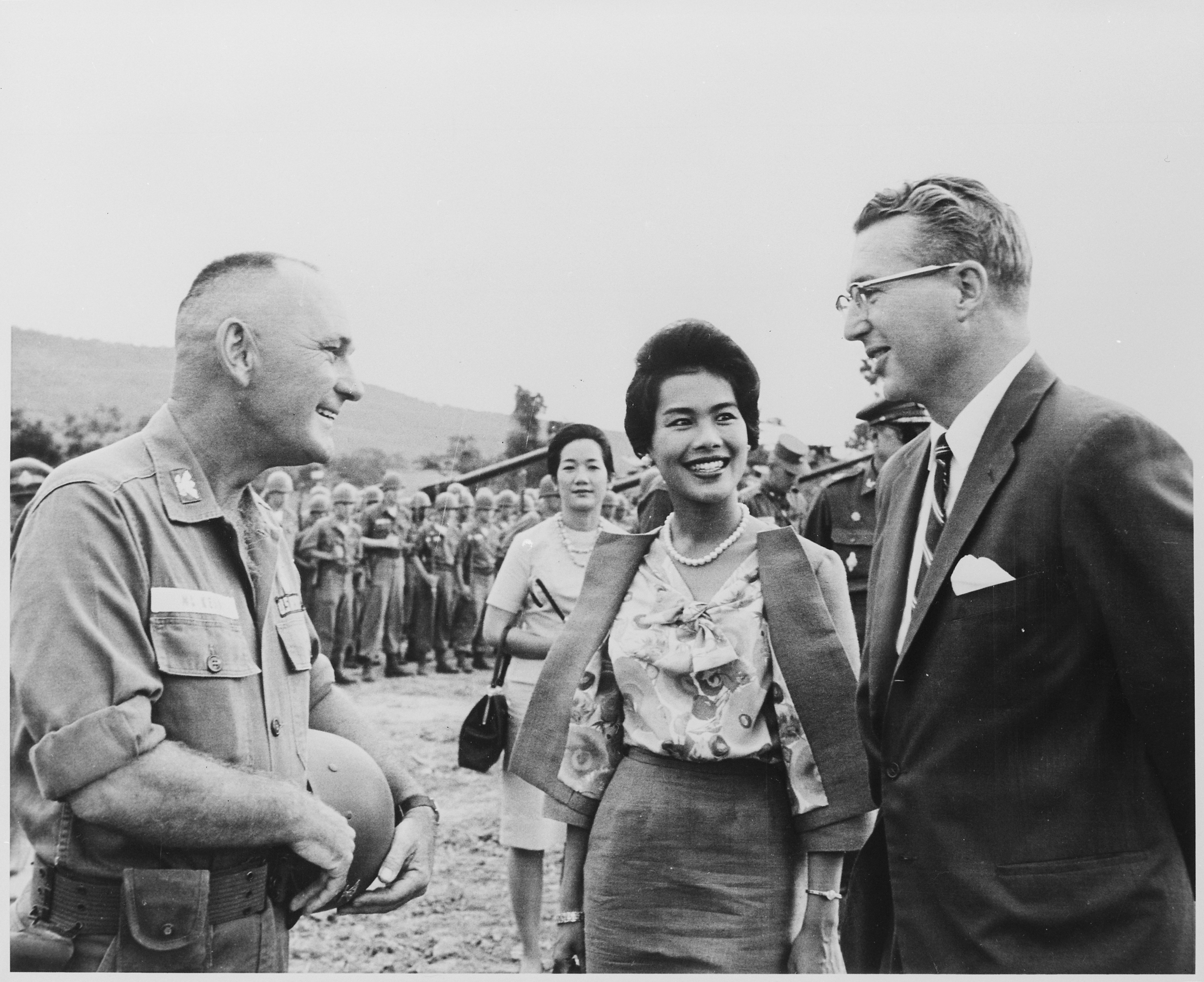
King Bhumibol and Queen Sirikit of Thailand visited the U.S. Army's 27th Infantry "Wolfhounds" near Korat, Thailand in 1962. Here, Queen Sirikit visited with Colonel William A. Mckean, Commander of the 27th, and U.S. Ambassador to Thailand, Kenneth T. Young Jr. The U.S. forces in Thailand are used to assist as instructors and advisors.

The official American military presence in Thailand started in April 1961 when an advance party of the USAF 6010th Tactical (TAC) Group arrived at Don Muang Royal Thai Air Force Base at the request of the Thai government to establish an aircraft warning system at Don Muang. The USAF presence grew rapidly with the expansion of the Laotian Civil War and the Vietnam War.

The USAF would eventually use 8 airbases in Thailand: Don Muang, Korat, Nakhon Phanom, Nam Phong, Takhli, Ubon, Udorn and U-Tapao.

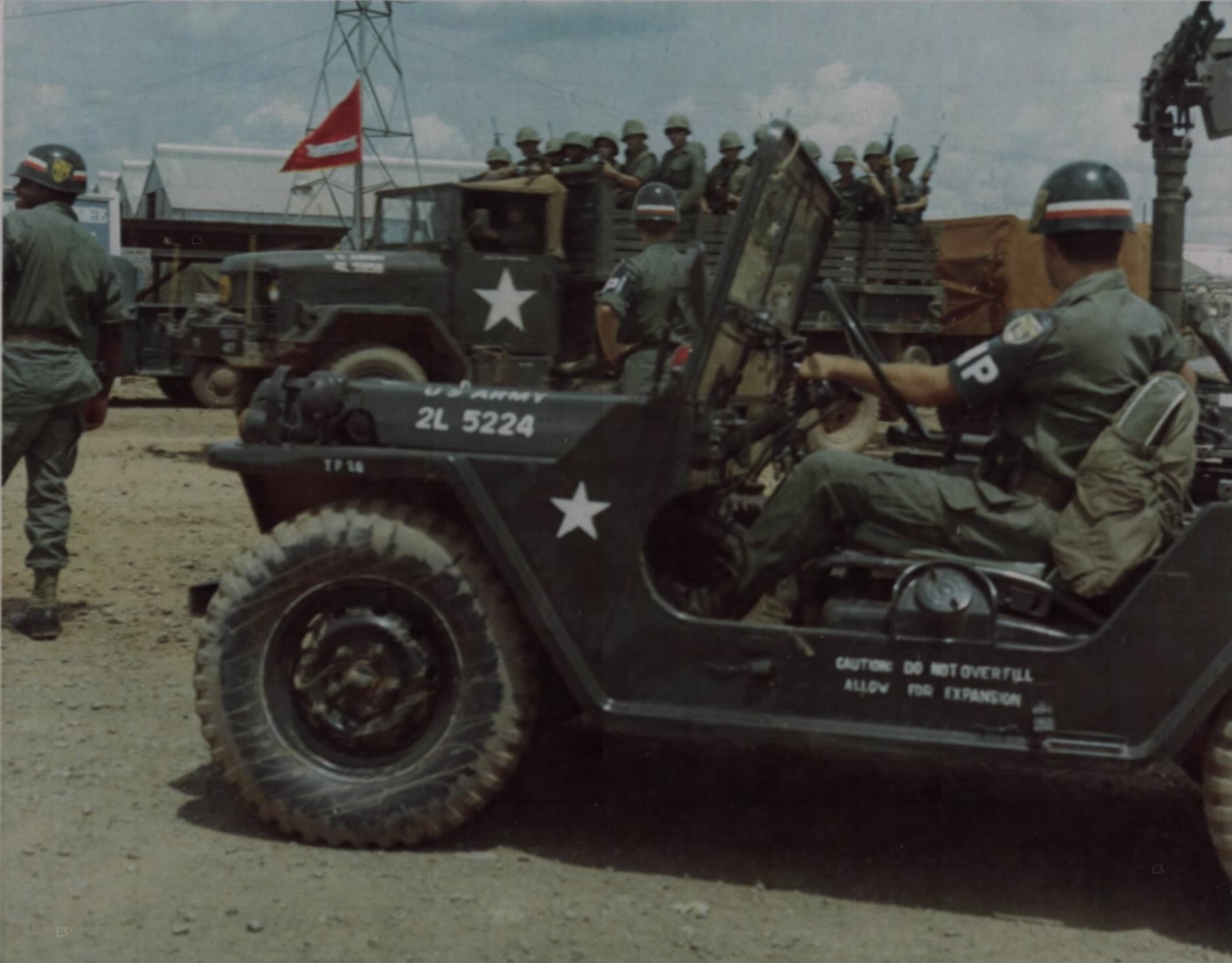
Military Police stop traffic to allow the 2 1/2-ton trucks carrying members of the Black Panther Division to leave Newport Docks, en route to Bearcat, 22 July 1968

The People's Army of Vietnam Special Forces infiltrated into Thailand several times to attack these airbases, with a 1972 raid on U-Tapao seeing three Boeing B-52 Stratofortress bombers being damaged with several sappers and a Thai sentry killed.

Over the course of the war, the United States poured $1.1 billion in economic and military aid into Thailand, while USAID poured in another $590 million, both aiding Thailand's economy and indirectly paying for the cost of Thailand's participation and then some. At the height of the war, some 50,000 American military personnel (mostly Air Force) were stationed throughout Thailand. Thai entrepreneurs built scores of new hotels, restaurants and bars to serve the waves of free-spending American G.I.s, causing foreign funding to flow into the country. At the war's end, Thailand kept all military equipment and infrastructure left by the Americans, aiding in the country's modernization.

On 14 October 1973 following the 1973 Thai popular uprising, former Supreme Court Judge Sanya Dharmasakti, then chancellor and dean of the faculty of law at Thammasat University, was appointed prime minister by royal decree, replacing the succession of staunchly pro-American and anti-Communist military dictatorships that had ruled Thailand previously.

With the fall of both Cambodia and South Vietnam in April 1975, the political climate between Washington and the government of PM Sanya had soured. Immediately after the news broke of the use of Thai bases to support the Mayaguez rescue, the Thai Government lodged a formal protest with the US and riots broke out outside the US Embassy in Bangkok. The Thai government wanted the US out of Thailand by the end of the year. The USAF implemented Palace Lightning, the plan to withdraw its aircraft and personnel from Thailand. The SAC units left in December 1975; and the 3rd Aerospace Rescue and Recovery Group left on 31 January 1976, however the base remained under US control until it was formally returned to the Thai government on 13 June 1976.

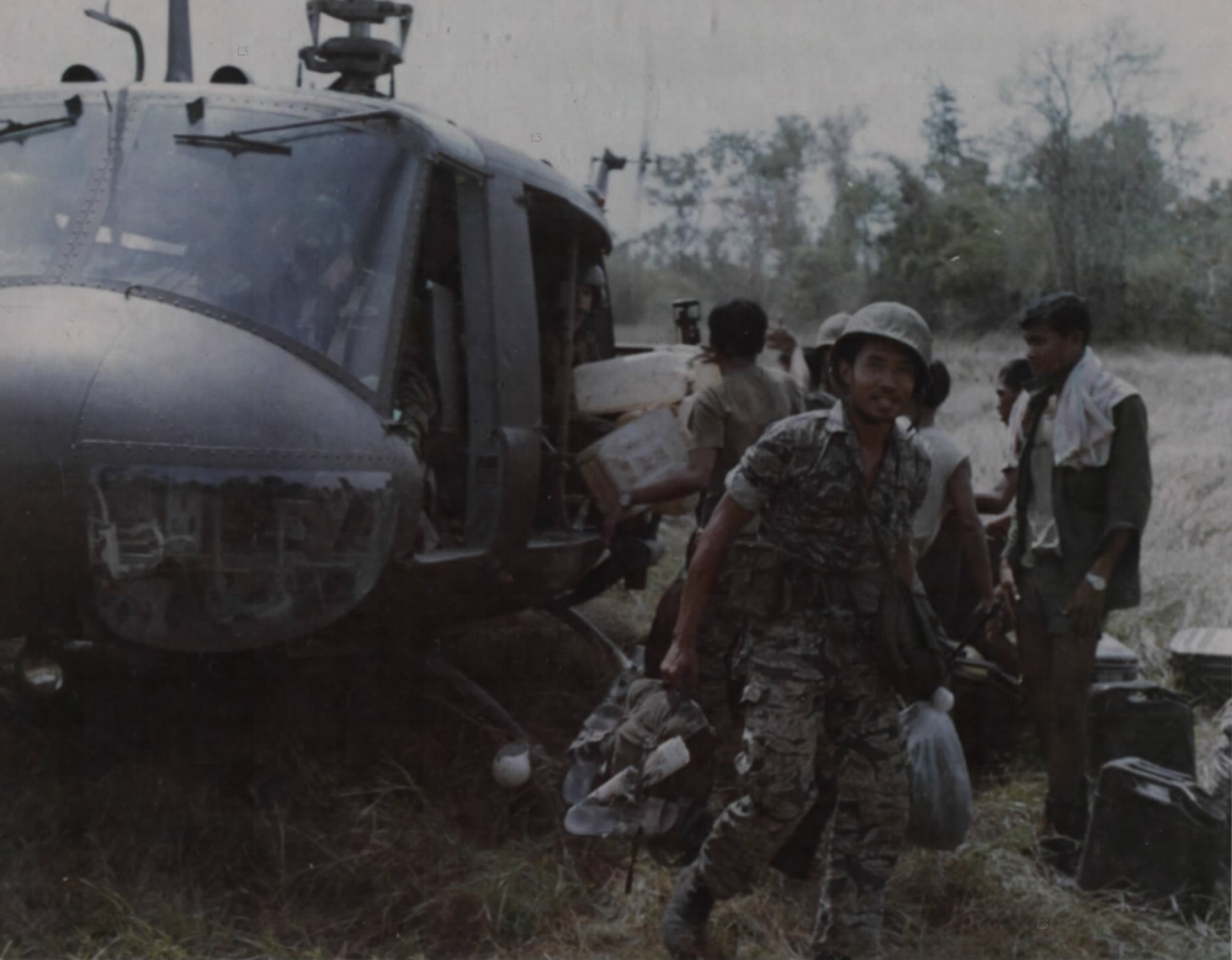
Royal Thai Army troops in the field south of Bearcat unload supplies from a UH-1D helicopter from the 240th Helicopter Assault Company, 23 January 1971

== Order of battle ==
- 1st Infantry Division (Wongthe-wan)
- 2nd Infantry Division (Bura-phaPayak/Eastern warriors)
- 9th Infantry Division (Black Panthers Division)
- Royal Thai Army Expeditionary Division (Black Panthers)
- Royal Thai Volunteer Regiment (Jong-Ang Suek/Queen's Cobras)

== Operations involving Thailand ==
- Tet Offensive
- Battle of Hat Dich
- Operation Toan Thang I
- Operation Toan Thang II
- Battle of Lima Site 85
- Operation Counterpunch
- Operation Phalat
- Operation Sayasila
- Operation Sourisak Montry VIII
- Operation Strength
- Campaign Toan Thang
- Battle of Vientiane
- Campaign Z

== See also ==
- Military Assistance Command, Vietnam
- Republic of China in the Vietnam War
- South Korea in the Vietnam War
- Thailand in the Korean War
- Communist insurgency in Thailand
