= 9th Infantry Division (Thailand) =

Special operations force of the Royal Thai Army

- กองพลทหารราบที่ 9
- Unit insignia
- Active: January 14th 1968–present
- Country: Thailand
- Branch: Royal Thai Army
- Type: Infantry
- Role: Combined arms
- Size: Division
- Part of: First Army Area
- Garrison/HQ: Fort Surasi, Kanchanaburi, Thailand
- Nicknames: Black Panthers Division (กองพลเสือดำ)
- Mascot: Black panther
- Engagements: Cold War; Vietnam War; Tet Offensive; Battle of Hat Dich; Operation Toan Thang I; Operation Toan Thang II; Operation Toan Thang III; Communist insurgency in Thailand; Communist insurgency in Malaysia; Vietnamese border raids in Thailand; Thai–Laotian Border War; Thai political crisis; March 1977 Thai coup d'état attempt; 1981 Thai military rebellion; 1991 Thai coup d'état; Black May (1992); War on drugs; Internal conflict in Myanmar (Humanitarian/Anti-Drug); 2010–2012 Myanmar border clashes (Humanitarian); 1999 East Timorese crisis; International Force East Timor; Global War on Terrorism; Iraq War; Southern Insurgency; Cambodia–Thailand border dispute; 2025 Cambodia–Thailand conflict
- Decorations: Army Meritorious Unit Commendation Vietnam Cross of Gallantry with Palm Vietnam Civil Actions Medal with Palm
- Website: http://www.surasee.com/index.php(in Thai)

Commanders
- Ceremonial chief: Wutthaya Chanthamat

The 9th Infantry Division (Thai: กองพลทหารราบที่ 9) (พล.ร.๙.) also known as Black Panthers Division (Thai: กองพลเสือดำ) is an infantry division of the Royal Thai Army, it is currently a part of the First Army Area. The unit is composed of the 9th Infantry Regiment, 19th Infantry Regiment and 29th Infantry Regiment.

Seal of Royal Thai Army Expeditionary Division

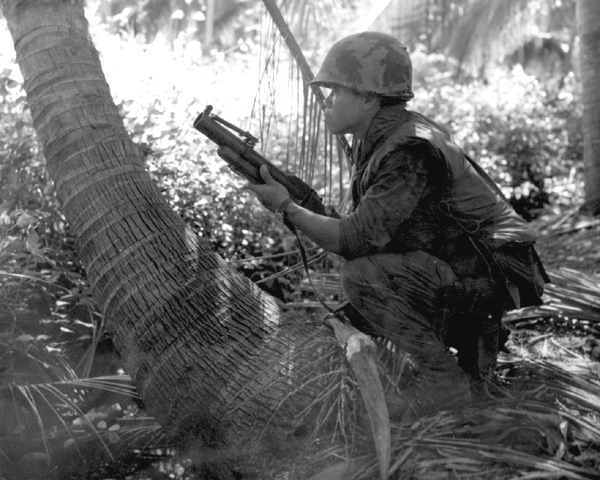
Queen's Cobras M79 grenadier in Phúc Thọ in 1967

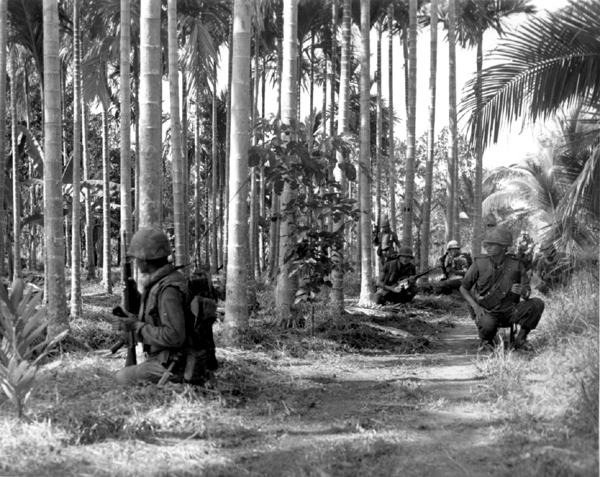
The Thai Queen's Cobra battalion in Phuoc Tho

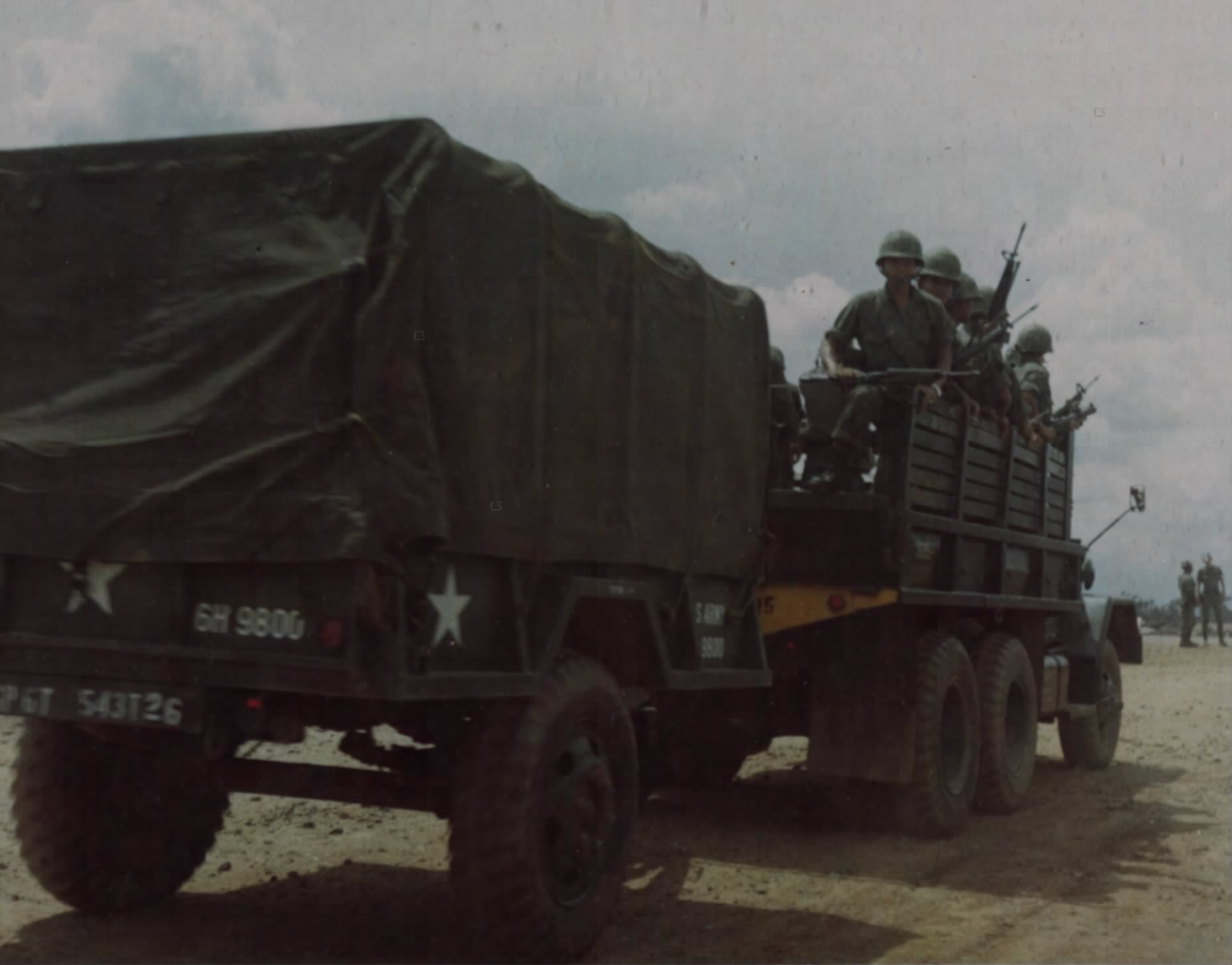
Members of Black Panther Division, loaded onto 2 1/2-ton trucks, roll through the gate of the US Army Terminal at Newport Docks en route to Bearcat, 22 July 1968

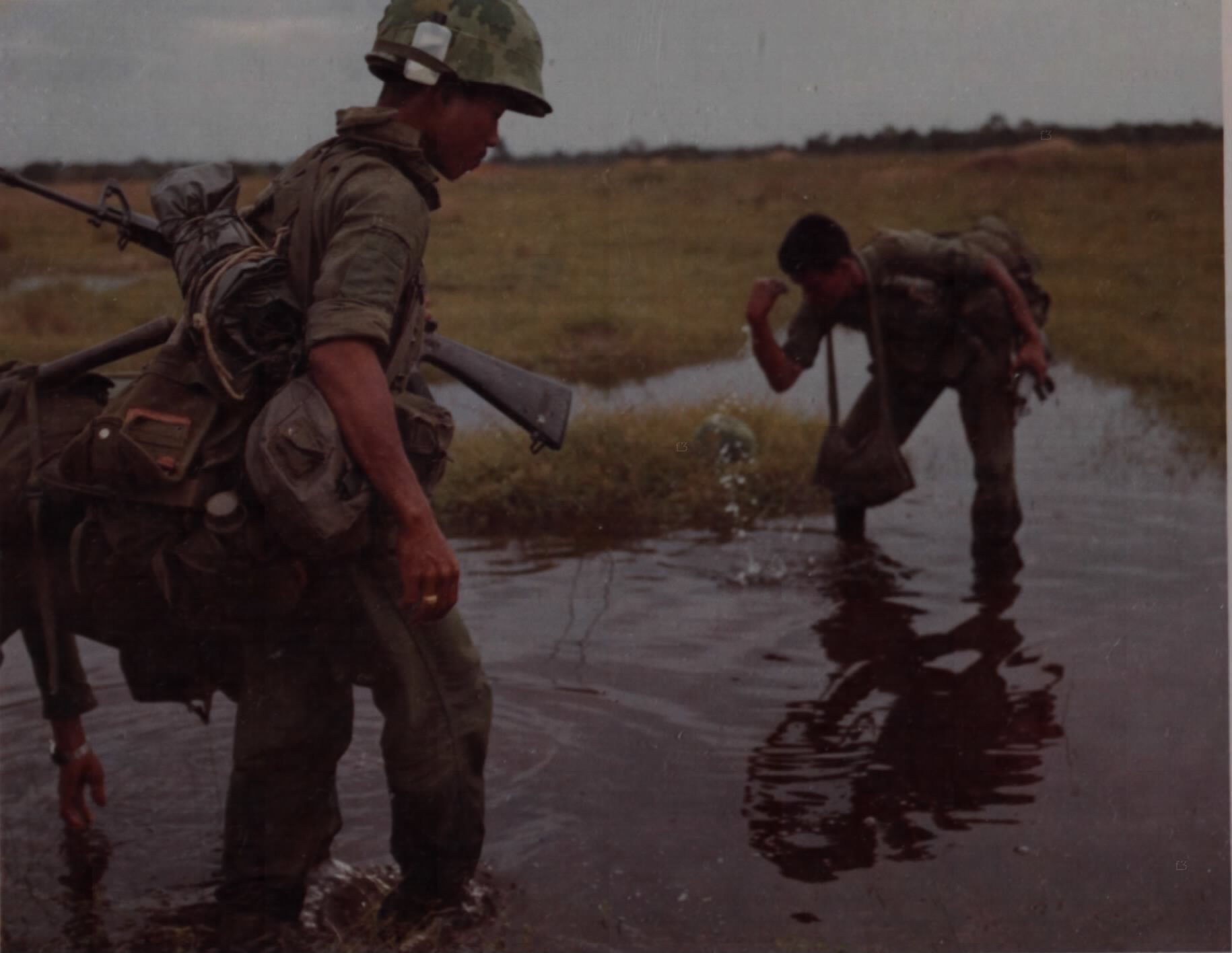
Thai soldiers wash in a small pool during a break in operations, Nhon Trac, 19 October 1967

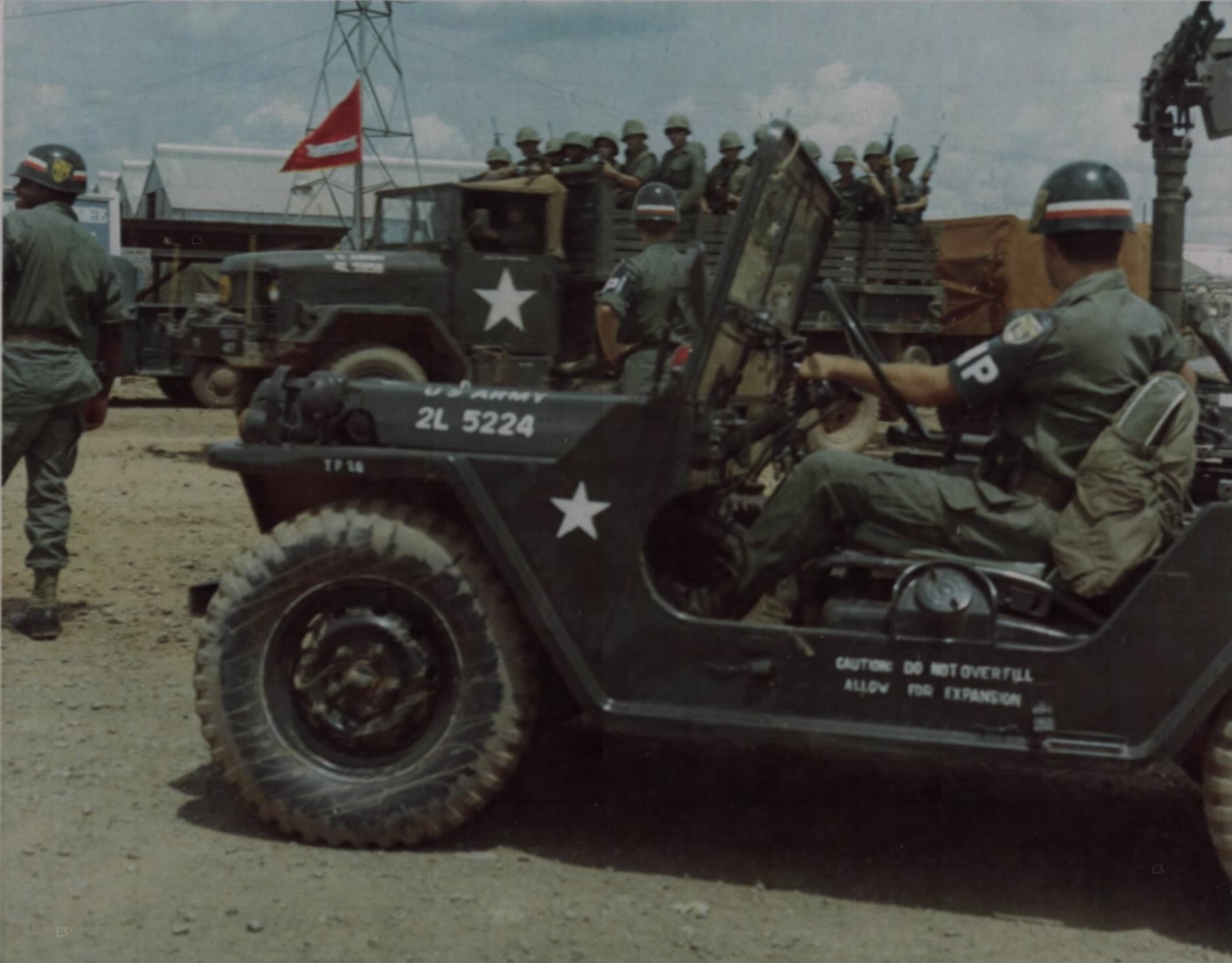
Military Police stop traffic to allow the 2 1/2-ton trucks carrying members of the Black Panthers Division to leave Newport Docks, en route to Bearcat, 22 July 1968

== History ==
After World War II ended in 1945, Vietnam announced that it would fight France for the liberation of Vietnam. The French colonies had to fight for 8 years until France accepted defeat and signed the Geneva Convention 1954 in Geneva. As a result, Vietnam was divided into two parts the North Vietnam and South Vietnam with the 17th parallel as the boundary between the two Vietnams. Under the leadership of Ho Chi Minh, who sought to reunite Vietnam, the North supported the Viet Cong as it harassed and infiltrated South Vietnam. The US government sent troops to assist the South Vietnamese military in alliance with Australia, New Zealand, the Philippines, South Korea and Thailand with Spain sending a medical unit. At the beginning of the Vietnam war the Thai government approved the principle of sending military assistance to the Government of the Republic of Vietnam. A task force was set up, called the Royal Thai Volunteer Regiment, whose mission was to fight and carry out civic action programs to assist South Vietnam. Combat operations in Vietnam had the nickname "Cobra". Preparations went forward for rotating volunteer regiments, under a Royal Thai Army Expeditionary Division.

On 9 June 1971, the Royal Thai Army issued an order setting up at Lat Ya, Muang district, Kanchanaburi province a new division composed of the volunteers who fought in Vietnam called the 9th Infantry Division, the reason being the twenty-four anniversary of the coronation of His Majesty King Bhumibol on 21 June 1974, the army has established the 9th Infantry Division also known as "Fort Kanchanaburi" or "Fort Surasi" in nowaday.

=== Vietnam War (1967-1972) ===
see Thailand in the Vietnam War

The Kingdom of Thailand, under the administration of military dictator Field Marshall Thanom Kittikachorn took an active role in the Vietnam War. Thailand was the third-largest provider of ground forces to South Vietnam, following the Americans and South Koreans.

Due to its proximity to Thailand, Vietnam's conflicts were closely monitored by Bangkok. Thai involvement did not become official until the total involvement of the United States in support of South Vietnam in 1963. The Thai government then allowed the United States Air Force in Thailand to use its air and naval bases. At the height of the war, almost 50,000 American military personnel were stationed in Thailand, mainly airmen.

In October 1967 the Royal Thai Volunteer Regiment (Queen's Cobras) was sent to Camp Bearcat at Bien Hoa, to fight alongside the Americans, Australians, New Zealanders and South Vietnamese. In 1968 the Cobras were replaced by the Royal Thai Army Expeditionary Division ("Black Panthers"). About 40,000 Thai military would serve in South Vietnam, with 351 killed in action and 1,358 wounded. The last Thai ground forces were withdrawn from South Vietnam on 5 February 1972.

=== East Timor (1999–2002) ===
After the East Timor crisis, Thailand, with 28 other nations, provided troops for the International Force for East Timor or INTERFET. Thailand also provided the force commander, Lieutenant General Winai Phattiyakul. The force was based in Dili and lasted from 25 October 1999 to 20 May 2002.

=== Iraq War (2003–2004) ===
After the successful US invasion of Iraq, Thailand contributed 423 non-combat troops in August 2003 to nation building and medical assistance in post-Saddam Iraq. Troops of the Royal Thai Army were attacked in the 2003 Karbala bombings, which killed two soldiers and wounded five others. However, the Thai mission in Iraq was considered an overall success, and Thailand withdrew its forces in August 2004. The mission is considered the main reason the United States decided to designate Thailand as a major non-NATO ally in 2003.

== Operation Deployments ==
- In 1968-1970 Combat missions in South Vietnam (Black Panther Division) Part of Vietnam War
- In 1972-1973 anti-communist operations Phitsanulok Loei Phetchabun Operations Samchai (1972) Part of Communist insurgency in Thailand
- In 1973-1974 anti-communist operations Chiang Rai Phayao Nan Part of Communist insurgency in Thailand
- In 1974-1981 anti-communist operations Phitsanulok Province Loei Province Phetchabun Province Part of Communist insurgency in Thailand
- In 1981-1982 The mission to protect the eastern border of the First Army Area in Prachuap Khiri Khan Province
- In 1983-1984 Efforts to end the insurgency led to an amnesty being declared on 23 April 1980 when Prime Minister Prem Tinsulanonda signed Order 66/2523. The order significantly contributed to the decline of the insurgency, as it granted amnesty to defectors and promoted political participation and democratic processes. By 1983, the insurgency had come to an end. Part of Communist insurgency in Thailand
- In 1988 In Sangkhla Buri District Anti-poaching sovereignty The race in Payathonzu
- In 1989-1999 South Korea Separate units of the Royal Thai Army in United Nations Command
- In 1995–present Western Border Protection Kanchanaburi Province to Prachuap Khiri Khan Province
- In 1999 Humanitarian Operation in East Timor Part International Force East Timor in 1999 East Timorese crisis
- In 2003 Humanitarian Operation in Iraq. Thai Humanitarian Assistance Task Force 976 Thai-Iraq part of Multi-National Force – Iraq in Iraq War
- In 2004–present facing an Islamist insurgency in Southern Insurgency
- In 2025 Support 2nd Army Area in 2025 Cambodia–Thailand conflict

== Organization ==
=== 9th Infantry Division Headquarters ===
- 9th Infantry Division
  - 9th Infantry Regiment
    - 1st Infantry Battalion
    - 2nd Infantry Battalion
    - 3rd Infantry Battalion
  - 19th Infantry Regiment
    - 1st Infantry Battalion
    - 2nd Infantry Battalion
    - 3rd Infantry Battalion (Designated as First Army Area Rapid Deployment Force)
  - 29th Infantry Regiment
    - 1st Infantry Battalion
    - 2nd Infantry Battalion
    - 3rd Infantry Battalion
  - 9th Field Artillery Regiment
    - 9th Field Artillery Battalion
    - 19th Field Artillery Battalion
    - 109th Field Artillery Battalion
  - Service Support Regiment
    - Transportation Battalion
    - Maintenance Battalion
    - Combat Medical Battalion
  - 19th Cavalry Squadron
  - 9th Combat Engineer Battalion
  - 9th Signal Corp Battalion
  - 9th Long Range Reconnaissance Patrols Company
  - Military Police Company
  - 9th Aviation Company
  - 14th Ranger Forces Regiment
  - 17th Military Circle
  - Fort Surasi Hospital

== Regimental decorations ==
- Army Meritorious Unit Commendation, Streamer embroidered :

VIETNAM 1968-1969

- Gallantry Cross Unit Citation with Palm, Streamer embroidered :

HÀNH QUÂN LỘC AN LONG THÀNH 1969

- Civil Actions Unit Citation with Palm, Streamer embroidered :

DÂN SỰ VỤ 1968-1969

== See also ==
- Thailand in the Vietnam War
- Thai Humanitarian Assistance Task Force 976 Thai-Iraq
- 1st Division (Thailand)
- 2nd Infantry Division (Thailand)
- 4th Infantry Division (Thailand)
- 5th Infantry Division (Thailand)
- 7th Infantry Division (Thailand)
- 15th Infantry Division (Thailand)
- King's Guard (Thailand)
- Royal Thai Army
- Thai Royal Guards parade
