= 7th Infantry Division (Thailand) =

Special operations force of the Royal Thai Army

- กองพลทหารราบที่ 7
- Active: March 17th 2011–present
- Country: Thailand
- Branch: Royal Thai Army
- Type: Mountain infantry
- Size: Division
- Part of: Third Army Area
- Garrison/HQ: Mae Rim, Chiang Mai, Thailand
- Motto: We Stay Up Front
- Engagements: War on drugs; Internal conflict in Myanmar (Humanitarian/Anti-Drug); 2010–2012 Myanmar border clashes; South Thailand insurgency
- Website: http://www.infdiv7.com/index1.htm(in Thai)

The 7th Infantry Division (Thai: กองพลทหารราบที่ 7) (พล.ร.๗.) is the only mountain infantry division of the Royal Thai Army (RTA), it is currently a part of the Third Army Area. The unit is composed of the 7th Infantry Regiment and 17th Infantry Regiment.

Normally, Thai infantry can fight the mountain terrain to a certain extent, but with the threat along the border that is a struggle between the ethnic minority and the Burmese government, including drug problems. So, the Royal Thai Army has established a mountain infantry unit specializing in fighting in jungle, steep, and hard-to-reach areas to respond to the threats of the border with steep mountain jungle terrain.

== History ==
The 7th Infantry Division was established by the Abhisit government to approve the proposal of the Ministry of Defence. Later, the Army has severing the order 9/54 on 17 March 2011 to establishing the 7th Infantry Division. It located at Fort Chao Khun Nen, Mae Rim, Chiang Mai.

== Organization ==
=== 7th Infantry Division Headquarters ===
- 7th Infantry Division
  - 7th Infantry Regiment
    - 1st Infantry Battalion (Designated as 3rd Army Area Rapid Deployment Force)
    - 2nd Infantry Battalion
    - 5th Infantry Battalion
  - 17th Infantry Regiment
    - 2nd Infantry Battalion
    - 3rd Infantry Battalion
    - 4th Infantry Battalion
  - 7th Field Artillery Battalion
  - 17th Field Artillery Battalion

== See also ==
- Thailand in the Vietnam War
- 1st Division (Thailand)
- 2nd Infantry Division (Thailand)
- 4th Infantry Division (Thailand)
- 5th Infantry Division (Thailand)
- 9th Infantry Division (Thailand)
- 15th Infantry Division (Thailand)
- King's Guard (Thailand)
- Royal Thai Army
- Thai Royal Guards parade
