= Thahan Phran =

Thai paramilitary force

- (left) Official Thahan Phran Marines Beret Capbadge (right) Official Thahan Phran Beret Capbadge
- Founded: 1978
- Country: Thailand
- Branch: Royal Thai Army; Royal Thai Marine Corps
- Size: Regiment
- Garrison/HQ: Pak Thong Chai
- Nicknames: Nak rob sua dum (นักรบเสื้อดำ) English translation : Black shirt warrior Iron Flowers (Female personnel)
- Mottos: Chat, Satsana, Phra Mahakasat. (Nation, Religion, King.)
- Colors: Black
- Engagements: Cold War; Communist insurgency in Thailand; Communist insurgency in Malaysia; Third Indochina War; Cambodian–Vietnamese War; Vietnamese border raids in Thailand; Thai–Laotian Border War; War on drugs; Internal conflict in Myanmar; Operation destroy Khun Sa's heroin factory in the Burmese; Battle of Ban Hin Taek; 2010–2012 Myanmar border clashes; South Thailand insurgency; Cambodian–Thai border dispute; 2008–2011 Cambodia–Thailand border crisis; 2025 Cambodia–Thailand clashes

Thahan Phran soldier with a HK33A2.

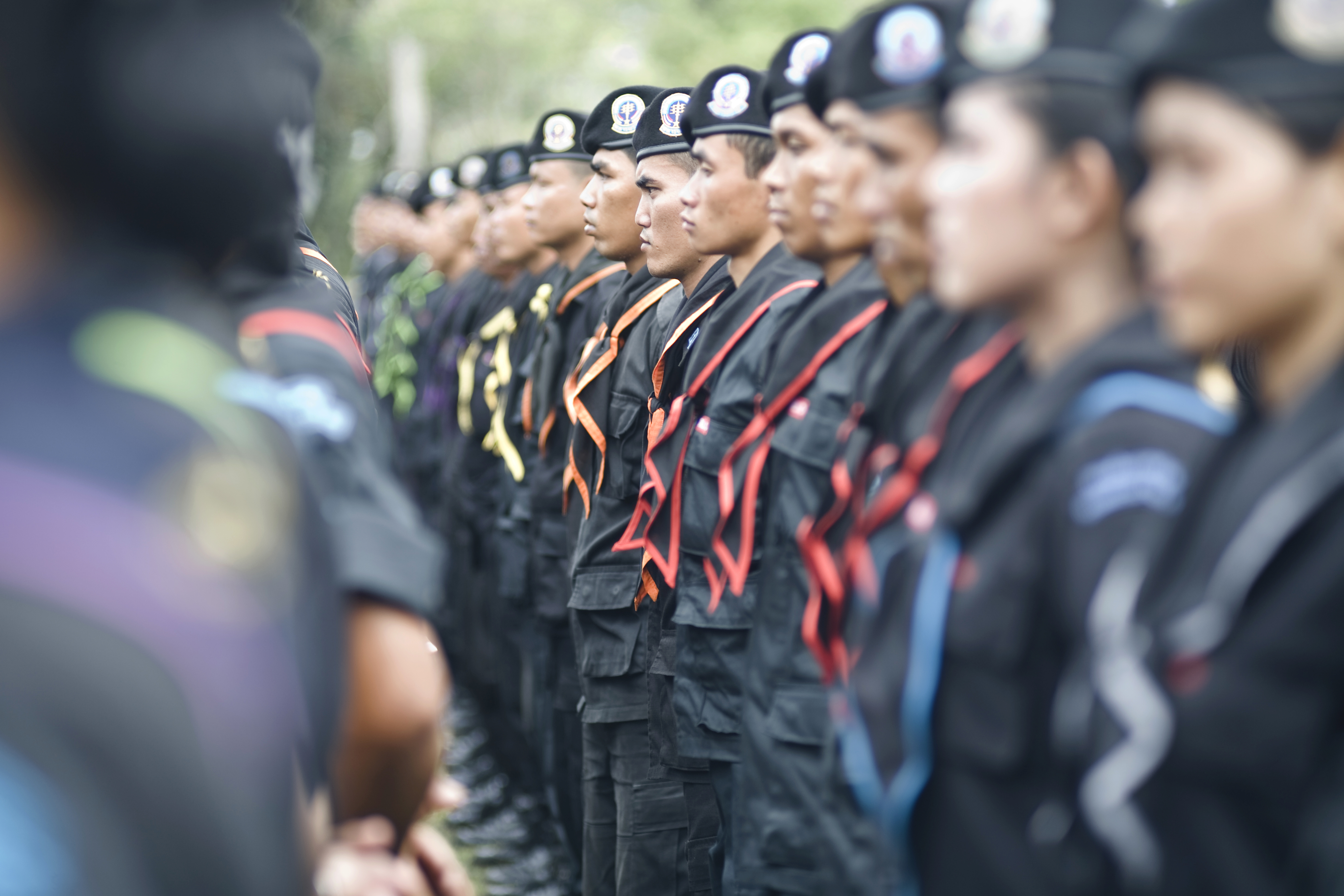

The Thahan Phran (ทหารพราน; literally "hunter soldiers"; AKA Thai Rangers) AKA the Royal Thai Paramilitary Force is a paramilitary light infantry force which patrols the borders of Thailand and is an auxiliary of the Royal Thai Army (RTA) and the Royal Thai Marine Corps (RTMC). The Thahan Phran operate in conjunction with the Border Patrol Police (BPP), but are trained and equipped to engage in combat while the BPP is primarily a law enforcement agency. In Thailand there is a common name of black clothing unit (นักรบเสื้อดำ) or the Black Army due to their wearing of black uniforms.

== History ==
The Thahan Phran was established in 1978 to fight Communist Party of Thailand (CPT) guerrillas and drive them from their mountain strongholds in northeast Thailand. Conceived by General Chavalit Yongchaiyudh, then Director of the Army Operations Centre at RTA headquarters in Bangkok, the unit was to be composed of recruits from regions affected by the communist insurgency, who would be given intensive training courses of 45 days, issued with modern weapons, and then sent back to their villages to mount guerrilla operations against the communists.

=== Controversy ===
In the past some of the Thahan Phran's initial recruits were convicted criminals whose sentences were remitted; others joined to obtain parcels of land granted as a reward for successful campaigns. To some extent the Thahan Phran were intended to supplant the Volunteer Defense Corps, a civilian militia responsible for protecting the local population from guerrillas. By late 1981, Thahan Phran had replaced up to 80 percent of regular army units in counter-insurgency operations on the Burmese, Cambodian and Malaysian borders.

Thahan Phran units conducted numerous operations against Khun Sa in the Golden Triangle and also participated in security actions during the standoff at Preah Vihear in 2008 and 2009.

The Thahan Phran have had a troubled history, with units often accused of atrocities, abuse of authority, and involvement in the drug trade. It has been reported that these units include local thugs who make use of their status to commit crimes against their fellow citizens. Numerous reforms have been made since the 1980s, particularly in screening recruits, and it is a more professional force than twenty years ago, but serious problems with discipline and human rights abuses remain.

The Thahan Phran are also suspected to have been involved in terrorist activities during the 2010 Redshirt riots in Bangkok.

== Special units of the Thahan Phran ==
In the late 1970s and early 1980s, Thahan Phran set up a covert special task force to suppress the communist insurgents in Thailand and a black operation to destroy Khun Sa's heroin factory. The unit was known as the Project Control and Coordination Section 513 and 514 (PCCS513 and 514) (Thai:ชุดควบคุมและประสานงานโครงการ 513 และ 514 (ชค.513 และ ชค.514)), they were trained like special forces.

- PCCS513 took on a mission to wipe out communist insurgents all over the country, and was the only unit of Thahan Phran Pak Thong Chai Camp who fought throughout the country and was the Thahan Phran's spearhead unit in the battle during Communist insurgency and Vietnamese border raids in Thailand and disbanded in the 1990s.
- PCCS514 took on a black operation to destroy Khun Sa's heroin factory in the Burmese side opposite Mae Chan District, Chiang Rai Province, Thailand. After the successful destruction Khun Sa's heroin factory, they took on a mission to counter and destroy Khun Sa's drugs along the Northern Thailand border and disbanded in April 1987.

Task Force 80 - In 1979 the influx of Cambodian refugees into Thailand became a significant political problem and a security issue, especially since thousands of them were Khmer Rouge combatants. Thai Prime Minister Kriangsak Chomanan, a professional soldier who had previously been Supreme Commander of the Royal Thai Army, placed the border districts under martial law and authorized the Joint Operation of the Supreme Command to control and provide security for the refugees. The Supreme Command responded by creating Task Force 80 in February 1980, a special Thahan Phran unit charged with defensive duties, refugee management, and the supply of food and weapons to the anti-Vietnamese resistance factions that Thailand supported, particularly the Khmer Rouge, as well as the Khmer People's National Liberation Front and the Armee Nationale Sihanoukiste or ANS. During its brief existence Task Force 80 was accused of frequent human rights violations until it was dissolved in August 1988. One observer summarized the Task Force 80 experiment thus:

"In a country with a dizzying array of different military units, the rangers were among the lowest paid, worst trained, and least disciplined of all Thai soldiers. They were at the bottom of the military status hierarchy: a poorly educated group who could not have made it into the more prestigious units. Indeed, they were regarded in some circles as little better than local thugs in uniform, who had been issued guns at a time when Communism was considered an immediate threat to Thailand's stability. With little supervision and a long history of often personal experience with the border conflict (many were local recruits from those villages that bore the brunt of the violence that spilled across the border), the rangers were not hesitant to take out their frustrations and aggression on the Khmer. Their "protective" presence often created more conflict than it prevented."

In 1998 the Salween Special Task Force was created to protect the Salawin National Park and Salawin Wildlife Sanctuary in Mae Hong Son Province.

In 2007 a new Thahan Phran regiment was formed for special duties in Chiang Saen, Chiang Khong and Wiang Kaen districts along the Mekong River in Chiang Rai Province. The regiment is responsible for curbing human trafficking and other illegal movements across the Mekong into Thailand from northwestern Laos. Thahan Phran cooperate closely with the Laotian authorities, informing them when they force illegal migrants to return to the Lao side.

== Requirements ==
Before joining Thahan Phran, all candidates must be able to pass the following requirements:

- Age 18-29
- Thai citizen
- Passing grade on physical fitness exam
- Graduate of grade 5
- Residency near the deployment site

Lacking the above requirements, the candidates must have a special ability such as relevant regional experience.

== Strength ==
The force is led by regular officers and NCOs, with the other ranks comprising both full-time and part-time personnel. Roughly one-third of these regional-level troops are given more advanced training to become an army-level force. The force completed a major reorganization and downsizing between October 2000 through late 2001. The re-organization saw eight of 21 regiments disbanded by General Surayud Chulanont, then commander-in-chief of the army. This was due to changes in the threats on Thailand's eastern and western borders as well as RTA budget cuts. The total strength is now believed to be about 10,600, a substantial decline from the nearly 20,000 (including reserves) reached in the early 1990s.

== Organization ==
=== Army ===
The headquarters at Pak Thong Chai, some 30 km south-southwest of Korat, was closed on 30 September 2000 and command transferred to the army's four regional headquarters. The Thahan Phran now has thirteen regimental headquarters (each with 46 headquarters personnel), 107 90-man companies, and twelve women's squads (each 11-strong).

Five regiments, with 37 companies, are now responsible for guarding the border with Myanmar, the 31st, 32nd, 35th, and 36th Regiments in the northwest, and the 14th Regiment in Kanchanaburi.

==== Field organization ====
In 1998 the Tahan Prahran consisted of 13 regiment headquarters (subordinate to Royal Thai Armies), 107 units (90 members), 12 women squads (11 members).

As of 2018 it is organized as follows:

- 1st Army - headquartered in Bangkok and is responsible for the country's western and central provinces including the capital city.
  - 11th Ranger Forces Regiment - Fort Thanarat, Pran Buri District, Prachuap Khiri Khan Province
  - 12th Ranger Forces Regiment - Muang Saikeo County, Saqeo County
  - 13th Ranger Forces Regiment - One Somboon County, Saquao County
  - 14th Ranger Forces Regiment - Kanchanaburi Province Muang Khan Thanh Buri County Tambon Wandon
- 2nd Army - headquartered in Nakhon Ratchasima and is responsible for the northeastern quadrant.
  - 21st Ranger Forces Regiment - Dear Sirie County, Loei County
  - 22nd Ranger Forces Regiment - Fort Suranari, Mueang Nakhon Ratchasima District, Nakhon Ratchasima Province
  - 23rd Ranger Forces Regiment - Kantarakul County, Nan Province
  - 26th Ranger Forces Regiment - Nakhon Ratchasima County Puck Tong Chai County
- 3rd Army - headquartered in Phitsanulok, responsible for the northern and northwestern parts of the kingdom.
  - 31st Ranger Forces Regiment - Phayao County Chienkam County
  - 33rd Ranger Forces Regiment - Fort Ekathotsarot, Mueang Phitsanulok District, Phitsanulok Province
  - 32nd Ranger Forces regiment - Muang Nan county in Narn province
  - 35th Ranger Forces Regiment - Kam Payne Pet County Clone Lane County
  - 36th Ranger Forces Regiment - Mae Hong Son County Mae Saarien County
- 4th Army - headquartered in Nakhon Si Thammarat, responsible for southern Thailand, engaged in the South Thailand insurgency.
  - 41st Ranger Forces Regiment - Yarra County Rahman County
  - 42nd Ranger Forces Regiment
  - 43rd Ranger Forces Regiment - Nolathiwat County Choi Ai Lane County
  - 45th Ranger Forces Regiment - Surat Thani County Baanna Thane County
  - 46th Ranger Forces Regiment
  - 47th Ranger Forces Regiment
  - 48th Ranger Forces Regiment
  - 49th Ranger Forces Regiment

=== Marine Corps ===
The Paramilitary Marine Regiment (Thahan Phran Marines) is organized as follows:

- Paramilitary Marine comprises 16 Companies
  - 1st Paramilitary Marine Company
  - 2nd Paramilitary Marine Company
  - 3rd Paramilitary Marine Company
  - 4th Paramilitary Marine Company
  - 5th Paramilitary Marine Company
  - 6th Paramilitary Marine Company
  - 7th Paramilitary Marine Company
  - 8th Paramilitary Marine Company
  - 9th Paramilitary Marine Company
  - 10th Paramilitary Marine Company
  - 11th Paramilitary Marine Company
  - 12th Paramilitary Marine Company
  - 13th Paramilitary Marine Company
  - 14th Paramilitary Marine Company
  - 15th Paramilitary Marine Company
  - 16th Paramilitary Marine Company
- 1st Female Paramilitary Marine 1 Platoon
  - 1st Female Paramilitary Marine Platoon

== Activities ==
On the western frontier, where there is sporadic fighting, the Thahan Phran work closely with the RTA and the Border Patrol Police. On the eastern border, facing Laos and Cambodia, they now have primary responsibility for border surveillance and protection. Many Rangers have been killed or wounded in recent years during cross-border attacks by Burmese troops or their allies, the United Wa State Army and Democratic Karen Buddhist Army. In February 2001, a 19-man Thahan Phran base designated Unit 9631, situated at Ban Pang Noon near Mae Sai on the Thai-Myanmar border, was captured by 500 Burmese troops. The RTA has tripled the strength of the Thahan Phran in the southern peninsula since violence surged there in 2004.

In October 1981 a 39-man unit of Thahan Phran and Burmese guerrillas attempted to assassinate the drug warlord Khun Sa at the instigation of the US Drug Enforcement Administration. The attempt failed, however in January 1982 a Thahan Phran squad from Pak Thong Chai, together with units from the BPP and the Royal Thai Army, was used to force Khun Sa to move his headquarters from Ban Hin Taek in northwest Thailand across the border into Myanmar.

Units of the Thahan Phran have been sent to the deep south to curb the South Thailand insurgency since 2004. They been responsible for apprehending and killing many key leaders in the area, but have also suffered casualties from ambushes.

== See also ==
- Village Scouts
- Pakistan Rangers, a similar organization in Pakistan
