= 4th Infantry Division (Thailand) =

Special operations force of the Royal Thai Army

- กองพลทหารราบที่ 4
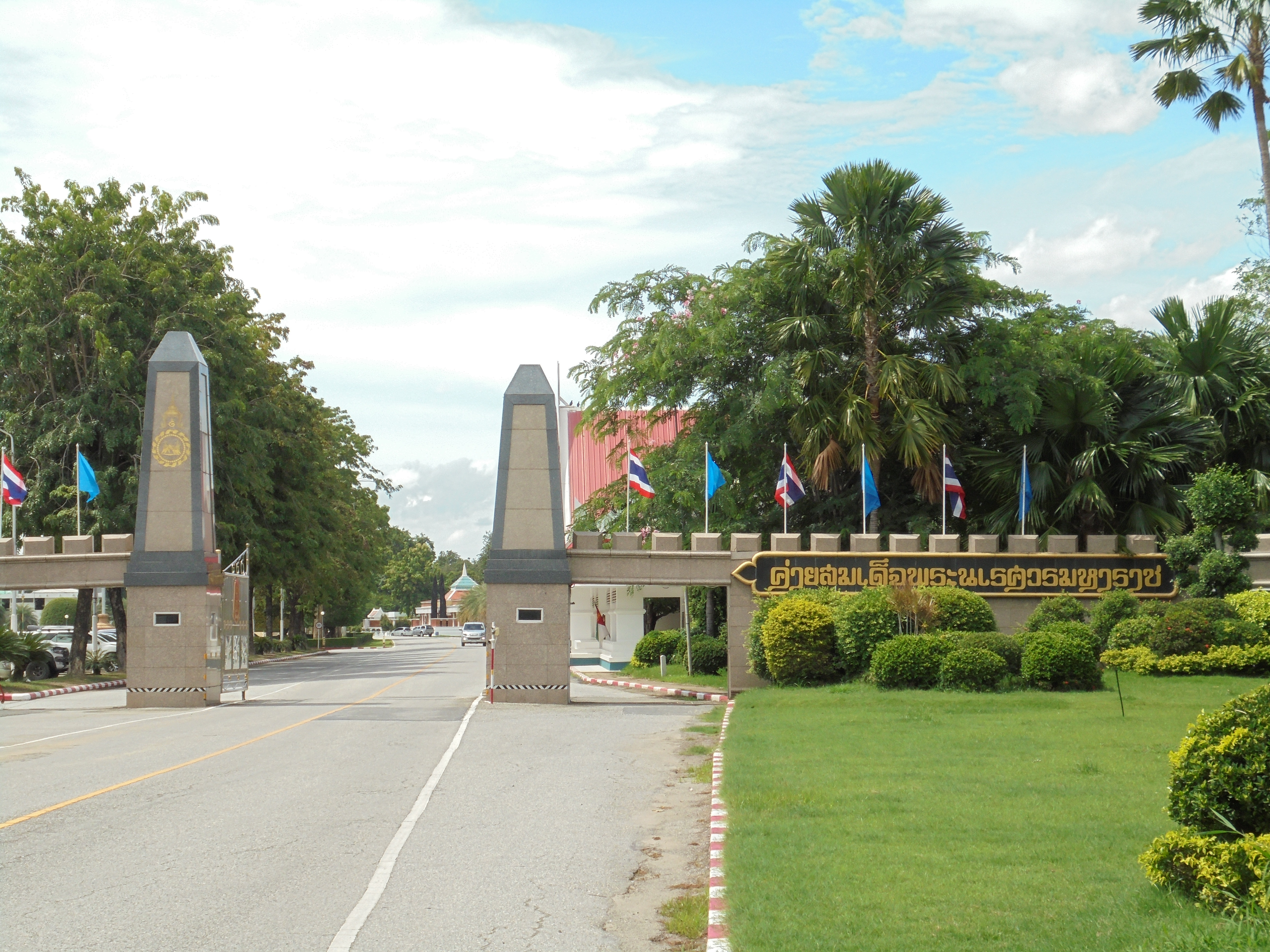
- King Naresuan Maharat Camp, 4th Infantry Division, Royal Thai Army in Ban Wat Yang, Ban Khlong subdistrict, Mueang Phitsanulok district, Phitsanulok province.
- Active: 2 December 1941–present
- Country: Thailand
- Branch: Royal Thai Army
- Type: Infantry
- Size: Division
- Part of: Third Army Area
- Garrison/HQ: Fort King Naresuan Maharat, Ban Khlong, Mueang Phitsanulok, Phitsanulok, Thailand
- Motto(s): Protect Strive Expertize (ปกป้อง มุ่งมั่น เชี่ยวชาญยุทธ)
- Engagements: World War II; Franco-Thai War; Pacific War; Burma campaign; Cold War; Communist insurgency in Thailand; Thai–Laotian Border War; 1999 East Timorese crisis; International Force East Timor; War on drugs; Internal conflict in Myanmar; Siege of Myawaddy; 2010–2012 Myanmar border clashes; Global War on Terrorism; Iraq War; United Nations peacekeeping; United Nations Mission in Sudan
- Website: http://4infdiv.rta.mi.th/(in Thai)

Commanders
- Current commander: Major General Narongritthi Panikbutr

The 4th Infantry Division (Thai: กองพลทหารราบที่ 4) (พล.ร.๔.) is one of two infantry divisions of the Third Army Area, Royal Thai Army (RTA) that specialized in border security, combined arms, and jungle warfare. It is currently a part of the Third Army Area. The unit is composed of the 4th Infantry Regiment and 14th Infantry Regiment.

== Organization ==
=== 4th Infantry Division Headquarters ===
- 4th Infantry Division
  - 4th Infantry Regiment
    - 1st Infantry Battalion
    - 2nd Infantry Battalion
    - 3rd Infantry Battalion
  - 14th Infantry Regiment
    - 1st Infantry Battalion
    - 2nd Infantry Battalion
    - 3rd Infantry Battalion
  - 4th Field Artillery Regiment
    - 1st Field Artillery Battalion
    - 2nd Field Artillery Battalion
    - 3rd Field Artillery Battalion
    - 4th Field Artillery Battalion
  - 4th Cavalry Reconnaissance Squadron
  - 9th Cavalry Squadron
  - 4th Combat Engineer Battalion
  - 4th Signal Corp Battalion
  - 31st Military Police Battalion

== See also ==
- Thai Humanitarian Assistance Task Force 976 Thai-Iraq
- 1st Division (Thailand)
- 2nd Infantry Division (Thailand)
- 5th Infantry Division (Thailand)
- 7th Infantry Division (Thailand)
- 9th Infantry Division (Thailand)
- 15th Infantry Division (Thailand)
- King's Guard (Thailand)
- Royal Thai Army
- Thai Royal Guards parade
