= USS Okanogan =

1944 American Haskell-class attack transport

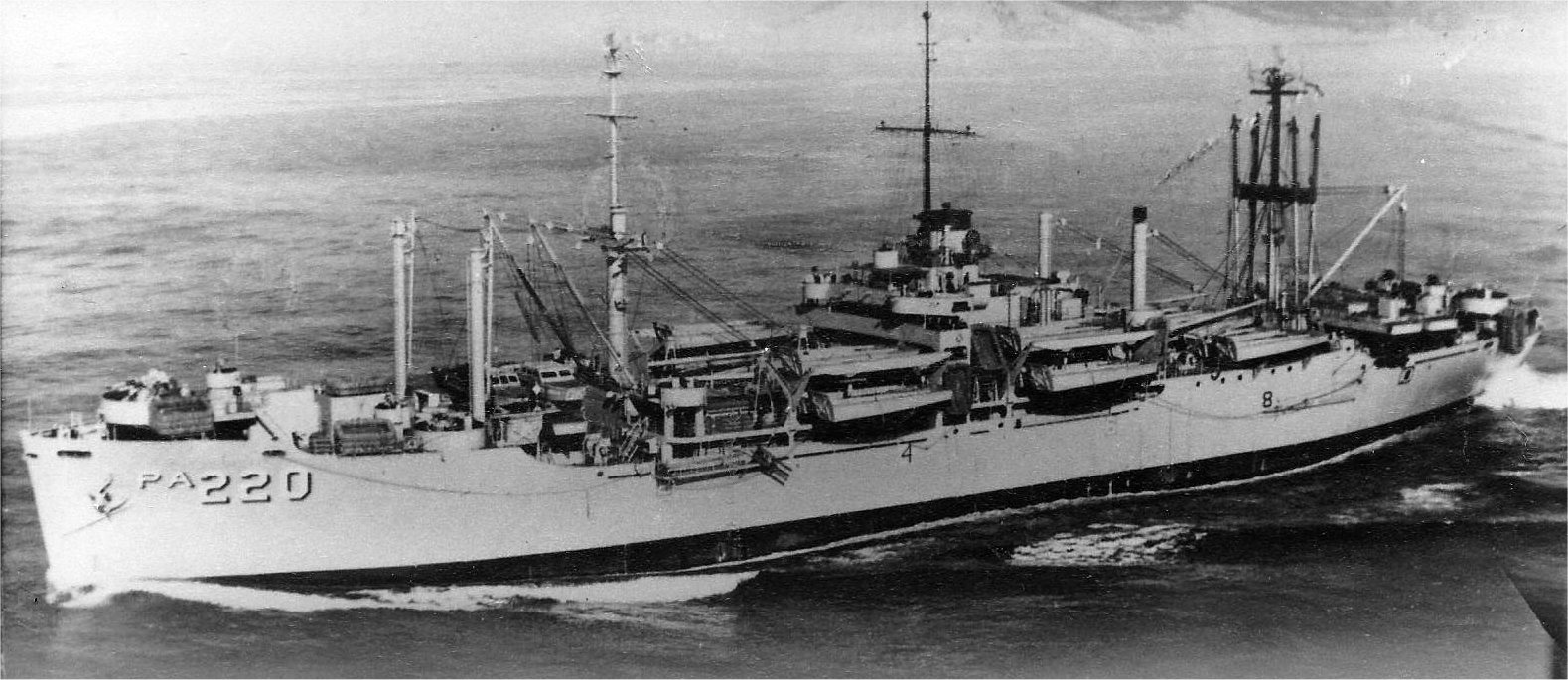
- USS Okanogan (APA-220), in the Western Pacific, c. 1958.

History

United States
- Name: Okanogan
- Namesake: Okanogan County, Washington
- Ordered: as a Type VC2-S-AP5 hull, MCE hull 568
- Builder: Permanente Metals Corporation, Richmond, California
- Yard number: 568
- Laid down: 10 August 1944
- Launched: 26 October 1944
- Sponsored by: Mrs E. J. Husted
- Commissioned: 3 December 1944
- Decommissioned: 5 February 1970
- Reclassified: redesignated Amphibious Transport (LPA-220), 1 January 1969
- Stricken: 1 June 1973
- Identification: Hull symbol: APA-220; Hull symbol: LPA-220; Code letters: NPQW
- Honors and awards: 1 × battle star for World War II service; 6 × battle star for Korean War service; 5 × campaign stars for Vietnam War service
- Fate: transferred to Maritime Administration (MARAD), 20 April 1971, laid up in the National Defense Reserve Fleet, Suisun Bay Group, Benicia, California trade-out, 2 October 1979, withdrawn, 19 November 1979

General characteristics
- Class & type: Haskell-class attack transport
- Type: Type VC2-S-AP5
- Displacement: 6,873 long tons (6,983 t) (light load); 14,837 long tons (15,075 t) (full load)
- Length: 455 ft (139 m)
- Beam: 62 ft (19 m)
- Draft: 24 ft (7.3 m)
- Installed power: 2 × Combustion Engineering header-type boilers, 465 psi (3,210 kPa) 750 °F (399 °C); 8,500 shp (6,338 kW)
- Propulsion: 1 × Westinghouse geared turbine; 1 x propeller
- Speed: 17.7 kn (32.8 km/h; 20.4 mph)
- Boats & landing craft carried: 2 × LCMs; 1 × open LCPL; 18 × LCVPs; 2 × LCPRs; 1 × closed LCPL (Captain's Gig)
- Capacity: 2,900 long tons (2,900 t) DWT; 150,000 cu ft (4,200 m^{3}) (non-refrigerated)
- Troops: 86 officers, 1,475 enlisted
- Complement: 56 officers, 480 enlisted
- Armament: 1 × 5 in (127 mm)/38 caliber dual purpose gun; 1 × quad 40 mm (1.6 in) Bofors anti-aircraft (AA) gun mounts; 4 × twin 40mm Bofors (AA) gun mounts; 10 × single 20 mm (0.8 in) Oerlikon cannons AA mounts

Service record
- Part of: TransRon 19
- Operations: World War II; Assault and occupation of Okinawa Gunto (17–22 April 1945); Korean War Era; North Korean Aggression (27 September, 8 October–2 November 1950); Communist China Aggression (3–15 November 1950, 4 December 1950 – 13 January 1951); First UN Counter Offensive (11 February–7 March 1951); Communist China Spring Offensive (26 April–6 May 1951); Second Korean Winter (22–26 April 1952); Korean Defense Summer–Fall 1952 (17–18 October 1952); Vietnam War; Vietnam Advisory Campaign (6–10 November 1963, 21–29 May, 15–17 June 1965); Vietnam Defense (4–8 July, 16 August–15 October 1965); Vietnam Counteroffensive–Phase II (1–3 July, 29 November–4 December 1966, 17 December 1966 – 3 February 1967, 15 February–18 March 1967); Vietnam Counteroffensive–Phase IV (13–20 June 1968); Vietnam Counteroffensive–Phase V (14 July–3 September, 24 September–4 October, 20–25 October, 30 October–1 November 1968); Vietnam Counteroffensive–Phase VI (2–7 November 1968)
- Awards: World War II; China Service Medal; American Campaign Medal; Asiatic–Pacific Campaign Medal; World War II Victory Medal; Navy Occupation Service Medal; National Defense Service Medal; Philippine Liberation Medal; Korean War; Korean Service Medal; United Nations Korea Medal; Republic of Korea War Service Medal; Republic of Korea Presidential Unit Citation; Vietnam Era; Armed Forces Expeditionary Medal; Vietnam Service Medal; Republic of Vietnam Gallantry Cross Unit Citation; Republic of Vietnam Campaign Medal

USS Okanogan (APA/LPA-220) was a Haskell-class attack transport that saw service with the US Navy in World War II, the Korean War and the Vietnam War. She was of the VC2-S-AP5 Victory ship design type and named after Okanogan County, Washington.

== Construction ==
Okanogan was laid down 10 August 1944, under Maritime Commission (MARCOM) contract, MCV hull 568, by Permanente Metals Corporation, Yard No. 2, Richmond, California; launched 26 October 1944; sponsored by Mrs. E. J. Husted; and acquired and commissioned 3 December 1944.

== Design ==
Okanogan's primary mission as an attack transport was to carry and disembark with her own landing craft, a full battalion of troops, and to evacuate troops, casualties, and prisoners of war from the objective. In line with this, she was equipped with all facilities for the troops embarked; messing, berthing, medical and dental care, and recreational facilities.

== Service history ==
=== World War II ===
Okanogan's first mission began 16 February 1945, when she sailed from San Francisco bound for Hawaii with the staff of Transport Division 57, along with a number of Navy, Marine, and civilian passengers.

==== Invasion of Okinawa ====
At Pearl Harbor Okanogan embarked some 740 Army assault troops, reinforcements for Okinawa, where she arrived 17 April. After five days off the fiercely embattled island, "where the fleet had come to stay", she sailed for Saipan, with 160 battle casualties. At Saipan 1,000 veterans embarked for San Francisco which she reached 1 June.

==== Transport duties ====
Okanogan voyaged across the Pacific and between the combat areas twice more as the war closed.

=== Post-war service ===
Only brief periods in West Coast ports broke her heavy schedule, brought on by the urgent need to redeploy troops for occupation duties and to return combat veterans to the United States. She completed a voyage at San Francisco 9 January 1946, and a month later sailed for Norfolk, Virginia, her home port for operations with the Atlantic Fleetfor the next four years.

=== Peacetime missions ===
As the Navy and Marines sharpened the techniques of warfare born in wartime, Okanogan made reserve training cruises and took part in maneuvers and exercises along the eastern seaboard, in the Caribbean, and, in the fall of 1949, in the Hawaiian Islands.

=== Korean War ===
Okanogan rejoined the US Pacific Fleet upon the outbreak of the Korean War, and in August 1950, loaded part of the 1st Marine Division at San Diego for Japan. These troops had been urgently requested by General Douglas MacArthur for a counter-offensive against North Korean aggression. Okanogan landed the men at Inchon 15 September, in an amphibious assault of incredible difficulty. The skill with which the operation was executed won acclaim from General MacArthur, who exclaimed "...the Navy and Marine Corps have never shone brighter …". Okanogan landed men of the same division in the assault on Wonsan 26 October.

Okanogan evacuated three thousand refugees from Chinampo in December; one more was born at sea and later named for the ship by its grateful parents. In January 1951, Okanogan brought more troops to Inchon, and in April served as flagship in demonstration landings at Kojo.

Returning to San Diego in May 1951, Okanogan trained indefatigably for future combat assignments. In September and October she carried men of the US Air Force to Yokohama, and sailed again for Japan in March 1952, carrying Naval Beach Group One. She transported the staff of Landing Ship Flotilla One to Kojedo, Korea, and carried out amphibious exercises off Japan, before returning to Long Beach in December.

=== Peacetime service ===
For the next eight years, Okanogan continued a tight program of training both for herself and for Marines when she was not deployed to the Far East. Such six to seven-month cruises were made in 1954, 1956, 1958, and 1959. An experience of her 1958 cruise illustrates the ability of the Navy to make a world-wide response to any crisis. When the US 6th Fleet landed Marines in Lebanon, in July, Okanogan, half a world away, at once proceeded to Okinawa, ready to load more Marines and carry them to the Mediterranean should they be needed.

During 1959 Okanogan was in San Francisco for overhaul and San Diego for refresher training.

Amphibious Squadron SEVEN including Okanogan left Long Beach on 16 February 1960, and after participating in a large scale amphibious exercise in Taiwan, a search and rescue operation and deterrent operations in the Taiwan Straits. Okanogan remained in Southeast Asia conducting amphibious exercises on Luzon in the Philippines and visited various ports. Her first mission, in preparing to return to Long Beach, was the delivery of ten landing craft to the Laotian government; her second, the loading of Thai and Vietnamese art treasures for a planned tour of the United States. Okanogan returned to Yokosuka Japan to reconfigure # 1 and 4 hatches and per-voyage repairs. Okanogan returned to Long Beach 25 July. For the remainder of the year Okanogan conducted amphibious exercises off the coast of California.

The Laotian situation entailed changes of embarkation plans for the 4th Marine Regiment. On 11 March 1961, while Amphibious Squadron SEVEN including Okanogan was in Hawaii, originally intended for an amphibious assault exercise on California beaches, the Marines were instead carried, under Top Secret orders, to Buckner Bay Okinawa where Amphibious Squadron SEVEN joined the amphibious squadron and an amphibious command ship already in WESTPAC until tensions abated. Amphibious Squadron SEVEN returned to Long Beach on 22 May 1961. Okanogan was in Portland Oregon for overhaul, San Diego for refresher training and amphibious exercises off the coast of California.

Amphibious Squadron SEVEN departed Long Beach for the Western Pacific on 22 January 1962. Okanogan operating as part of Amphibious Ready Group SEVENTH Fleet. She remained in Southeast Asia conducting amphibious exercises on Luzon in the Philippines and visited various ports. OKANOGAN returned to Long Beach on 24 July. During international tensions brought on by the discovery of Russian missile sites in Cuba, Amphibious Squadron SEVEN including Okanogan embarked units of the 5th Marine Expeditionary Brigade and sailed from San Diego on 27 October, with two reinforced amphibious squadrons and the amphibious command ship Eldorado. The Panama Canal was closed to commercial shipping and on 5 November warships of Amphibious Group THREE arrived in Panama. The 22 amphibious ships passed thru the canal to the Caribbean. Okanogan operated with the Atlantic Fleet until tensions abated with the withdrawal of the missiles. Okanogan returned to Long Beach on 15 December 1962. For the remainder of 1962, the ship remained in Long Beach with the heavy cargo remaining aboard.

During 1963–1964, Okanogan again cruised with the 7th Fleet in the Western Pacific.

==== Project SHAD ====
Okanogan was subjected to simulated chemical weapon attacks in January and February 1965 under Project SHAD.

=== Vietnam War ===
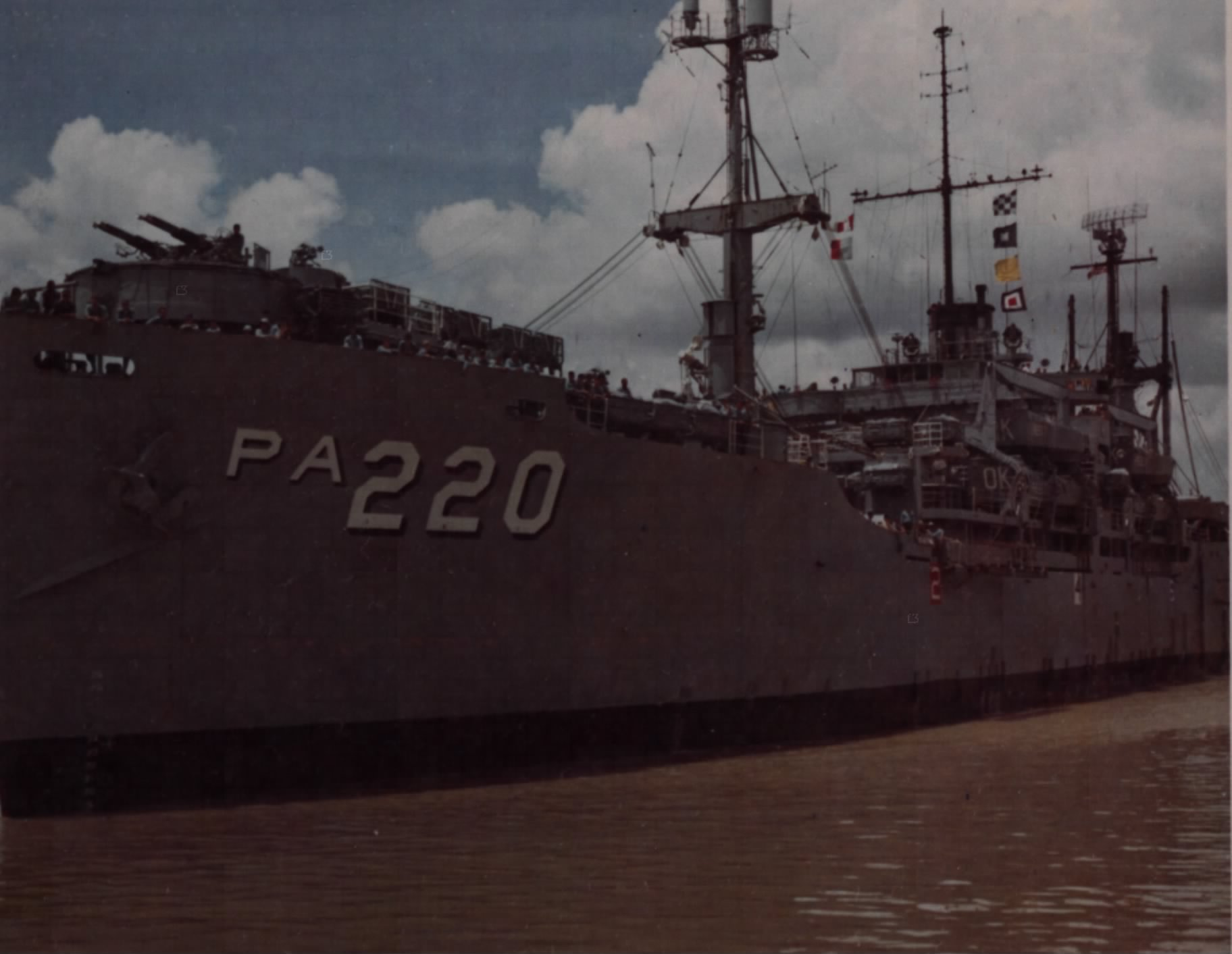
USS Okanogan arrives at Newport, Saigon, carrying men of the Thai Black Panther Division, 22 July 1968

Okanogan left Long Beach 19 April 1965, it was for direct participation in the Vietnam War. Through May and June 1965, Okanaogan carried men and ammunition between Okinawa and Da Nang, Chu Lai, and Qui Nhơn; from July to November, she served as station ship at Da Nang, providing the Navy Support Activity there with berthing and messing facilities for 700 to 900 persons. Her boats operated 18 to 20 hours a day in this essential support for build-up of one of the major bases for the Allied effort to repel Communist aggression.

Okanogan returned to Long Beach 17 December, and in June and July 1966, again voyaged to South Vietnam, carrying Marine communications technicians. On 17 November 1966, she returned to Da Nang as station ship. Okanogan arrived at home port Long Beach on 14 June 1967. As a member of Amphibious Force Pacific, Okanogan continued her mission in transporting, training and supporting the fleet into 1968.

== Decommissioning ==
She was decommissioned 5 February 1970, with delivery to the Maritime Administration (MARAD) 20 April 1971. Okanogan was laid up in the National Defense Reserve Fleet, Suisun Bay Group, Benicia, California. She was struck from the Navy Vessel Register on 1 June 1973.

=== Fate ===
On 2 October 1979, Nissho-Iwai American Corporation, traded SS Santa Rita for Okanogan. She was withdrawn 19 November 1979, to be scrapped by Dong Kuk Steel, South Korea.

== Decorations ==
Okanogan received one battle star for World War II Service, six for Korean War Service, four for Armed Forces Expeditionary Service, and five campaign stars for Vietnam War Service.

== Notes ==
Citations

== Bibliography ==
Online resources

- "Okanogan". Dictionary of American Naval Fighting Ships. Naval History and Heritage Command. 17 August 2015. This article incorporates text from this source, which is in the public domain.
- "Kaiser Permanente No. 2, Richmond CA". Shipbuilding History. 13 October 2010.
- "USS Okanogan (LPA-220)". NavSource. 7 January 2017.
- "OKANOGAN (APA-220/LPA-220)". United States Department of Transportation. Archived from the original on 13 April 2015.
