= 5th Infantry Division (Thailand) =

Special operations force of the Royal Thai Army

- กองพลทหารราบที่ 5
- Unit insignia
- Active: February 19th 1939–present
- Country: Thailand
- Branch: Royal Thai Army
- Type: Infantry
- Size: Division
- Part of: Fourth Army Area
- Garrison/HQ: Fort Thep Satri Srisunthorn Thung Song, Nakhon Si Thammarat, Thailand
- Engagements: World War II; Franco-Thai War; Pacific War; Japanese invasion of Thailand; Battle of Prachuap Khiri Khan; Battle of Chumphon; Battle of Nakhon Si Thammarat; Battle of Surat Thani; Battle of Pattani; Battle of Songkhla; Malayan campaign; Cold War; Communist insurgency in Thailand; Communist insurgency in Malaysia; South Thailand insurgency
- Website: http://www.infdiv5.com/main.html(in Thai)

The 5th Infantry Division (Thai: กองพลทหารราบที่ 5) (พล.ร.๕.) is an infantry division of the Royal Thai Army (RTA) that specialized in border security, combined arms, and counterinsurgency. It is currently a part of the Fourth Army Area. The unit is composed of the 5th Infantry Regiment, 15th Infantry Regiment and 25th Infantry Regiment.

== History ==
Before World War II, to take place in Japan, the then superpowers in Asia. Partner resources as raw materials To expand its military power. The government, led by Thailand's Field Marshal Plaek Phibunsongkhram Prime Minister and Minister of Defense. Look that the southern area are precarious. And not have military units to protect the sovereign which Field Marshal Phin Choonhavan Chief of the Royal Thai Army at that time. Ask expansion units Infantry Battalion and Artillery Battalion in the Southern Thailand. Consider placing The units from north to south, according to the strategy.

- 38th Infantry Battalion in Chumphon Province
- 39th Infantry Battalion in Nakhon Si Thammarat Province
- 40th Infantry Battalion in Trang Province
- 41st Infantry Battalion in Songkhla Province
- 42nd Infantry Battalion in Pattani Province
- 43rd Artillery Battalion in Songkhla Province

=== Franco-Thai War (1940–1941) ===
The Prime Minister approved the establishment of the first main military unit separates from 2nd Infantry Battalion, 11th Infantry Regiment Phetchaburi Province traveled to the site at Kho Hong Camp (Sena Narong Camp), Hat Yai District, Songkhla Province on 19 February 1939 and the following year. In the year 1941 At Franco-Thai War the army ordered the battalion in the south to be a reserve unit. In the east, northeast, and northern regions until the end of the mission returned.

=== Japanese invasion of Thailand (1941) ===
In 1941, as World War II, Japan was hit by Thailand to Burma And Malaysia on December 8, 1941, by troops ashore on the east coast of the provinces. Nakhon Si Thammarat, Songkhla, Pattani, which suffered heavy damage. The resistance of Thailand until the heroism of soldiers who died in battle. And has built a monument to the heroes of those monuments, like the Godfather Thailand beaching black sergeant. Nakhon Si Thammarat, Thailand. The. Ingkharayuthboriharn fattening. Pattani, Songkhla, etc. Senanarong Khun Seni Department of combat exploits at that time. Japan is not successful In ashore And Thailand to prevent the Japanese invasion of Burma. And Malaysia.

Thailand had a well-trained military of 26,500 men, together with a reserve force which brought the army's numbers up to about 50,000.

The Royal Thai Army started to set up the new military units in the Kra Peninsula including:

- Chumphon
  - the 38th Infantry Battalion stationed at Ban Na Nian, Tambon Wang Mai, Muang District of Chumphon (9 km from Provincial Hall).
- Nakhon Si Thammarat
  - the 39th Infantry Battalion stationed at Tambon Pak Phoon, Muang District of Nakhon Si Thammarat.
  - the 15th Artillery Battalion stationed at Tambon Pak Phoon, Muang District of Nakhon Si Thammarat.
  - Headquarter of the Sixth Division at Tambon Pak Phoon, Muang District of Nakhon Si Thammarat.
- Trang
  - the 40th Infantry Battalion
- Songkla
  - the 5th Infantry Battalion stationed at Tambon Khao Kho Hong, Hat Yai District of Songkla, transferred from Bang Sue to Hat Yai by military train on 18 February 1940, the first unit that moved to the south.
  - the 41st Infantry Battalion stationed at Suan Tun, Tambon Khao Roob Chang, Muang District of Songkla.
  - the 13th Artillery Battalion stationed at Suan Tun, Tambon Khao Roob Chang, Muang District of Songkla.
- Pattani
  - the 42nd Infantry Battalion stationed at Tambon Bo Thong, Nong Jik District of Pattani.

=== Malayan Emergency (1948–1960) ===
In 1949 Thailand and Malaysia had Joint Operation fighting communist guerillas in Malaya Betong district of Yala province.

=== Communist insurgency in Malaysia and Communist insurgency in Thailand (1965–1989) ===
In 1965 the Communist era Under the leadership of China Has extensive influence in Southeast Asia. Thailand is a prime target as the Domino theory. While Royal Thai Army has deep threat analysis of Thailand 1–2 decades, if disputes of foreign troops. Maybe troops along the coast. The expansion of the military in the Southern Thailand. A brigade-level unit, and on March 3, 1975, the 5th Infantry Division has set up two units to control the mixing of the first district of the city. Nakhon Si Thammarat later moved to the brigade headquarters. Fort Senanarong Hat Yai to suppress bandits, communist Malaya for four years, Thailand has lost troops and munitions huge budget until November 23rd 1979 has moved the brigade headquarters to the usual Fort Thepsatri Sri(Fort Thung Song), Nakhon Si Thammarat Up until now.

== Organization ==
=== 5th Infantry Division Headquarters ===
- 5th Infantry Division
  - 5th Infantry Regiment
    - 1st Infantry Battalion
    - 2nd Infantry Battalion
    - 3rd Infantry Battalion
  - 15th Infantry Regiment
    - 1st Infantry Battalion
    - 2nd Infantry Battalion (Designated as 4th Army Area Rapid Deployment Force)
    - 4th Infantry Battalion
  - 25th Infantry Regiment
    - 1st Infantry Battalion
    - 2nd Infantry Battalion
    - 3rd Infantry Battalion
  - 5th Field Artillery Regiment
    - 5th Field Artillery Battalion
    - 15th Field Artillery Battalion
    - 25th Field Artillery Battalion
    - 105th Field Artillery Battalion
  - 5th Cavalry Reconnaissance Squadron
  - 16th Cavalry Squadron
  - 5th Combat Engineer Battalion
  - 5th Signal Corp Battalion
  - 5th Medical Battalion

== See also ==
- 1st Division (Thailand)
- 2nd Infantry Division (Thailand)
- 4th Infantry Division (Thailand)
- 7th Infantry Division (Thailand)
- 9th Infantry Division (Thailand)
- 15th Infantry Division (Thailand)
- Royal Thai Marine Corps
- King's Guard (Thailand)
- Royal Thai Army
- Thai Royal Guards parade
