= 15th Infantry Division (Thailand) =

Special operations force of the Royal Thai Army

- กองพลทหารราบที่ 15
- Unit insignia
- Active: April 1, 2007–present
- Country: Thailand
- Branch: Royal Thai Army
- Type: Infantry
- Size: Division
- Part of: Fourth Army Area
- Garrison/HQ: Fort Ingkhayutthaborihan, Nong Chik, Pattani, Thailand
- Engagements: South Thailand insurgency
- Website: http://www.infantry-division15.com/Inf_Dev15.html(in Thai)

The 15th Infantry Division (Thai: กองพลทหารราบที่ 15) (พล.ร.๑๕.) is an infantry division of the Royal Thai Army (RTA) that specialized in border security, combined arms, and counterinsurgency. It is currently a part of the Fourth Army Area.

The unit is composed of the 151st Infantry Regiment, 152nd Infantry Regiment and 153rd Infantry Regiment, Service Support Regiment, and has its own battalion-level military intelligence unit.

The division engaged in the South Thailand insurgency.

== History ==
=== South Thailand insurgency (2001–ongoing) ===
The ongoing South Thailand insurgency had begun in response to Prime Minister Plaek Phibunsongkhram's 1944 National Cultural Act, which replaced the use of Malaya in the region's schools with the Thai language and also abolished the local Islamic courts in the three ethnic Malay and Muslim majority border provinces of Yala, Pattani, and Narathiwat. However, it had always been on a comparatively small scale.

The South Thailand insurgency intensified in 2001, during the government of Prime Minister Thaksin Shinawatra. Terrorist attacks were now extended to the ethnic Thai minority in the provinces. The Royal Thai Armed Forces also went beyond their orders and retaliated with strong armed tactics that only encouraged more violence. By the end of 2012 the conflict had claimed 3,380 lives, including 2,316 civilians, 372 soldiers, 278 police, 250 suspected insurgents, 157 education officials, and seven Buddhist monks. Many of the dead were Muslims themselves, but they had been targeted because of their presumed support of the Thai government.

The creation of the 15th Infantry Division was announced in January 2005. Defence Minister, General Samphan Boonyanan, was quoted as saying that the new unit, dubbed the "Development Division", would not be a combat unit for fighting Islamic militants, but rather its main mission would be to assist local citizens and develop the region. The military will not ignore its general function of providing safety for the citizens of the region, he added. He said that troops for the new division would undergo training to give them a good understanding of local residents, the vast majority of whom are ethnic Malay Muslims.

The division is in fact a transformation of the Pranburi-based 16th Infantry Division. It will now be headquartered at Fort Ingkhayutthaborihan in Pattani, complete with its battalions and companies of military police and communications and aviation personnel, he said. It will also have three separate infantry battalions, one each in Pattani, Yala, and Narathiwat. Each battalion will include three companies of medical, engineering, and psychological warfare personnel, he said. The government will allocate a budget of more than 18 billion baht for the division over the next four years.

The 15th Infantry Division is being established as a permanent force to handle security problems in the Deep South. The division is based in Pattani and is expected to have a combined force of around 10,000. The establishment of this new division, approved by the government in 2005, has yet to be completed. As of this writing, some 7,000 troops deployed in the Deep South are affiliated to this division."

In 2005, General Prawit Wongsuwon, then commanders-in-chief of the Royal Thai Army, recognized the importance of military intelligence operations in counterinsurgency operations following the South Thailand insurgency. Therefore, an attempt was made to propose the idea of establishing a military intelligence unit for the 15th Infantry Division to the Minister of Defense to present this idea to the Cabinet to establish a military intelligence unit for the 15th Infantry Division.

Later in 2008, The 15th Infantry Division was authorized to establish its own battalion-level military intelligence unit under Army Order 95/50, officially named the 15th Military Intelligence Battalion, based at Fort Somdej Phra Suriyothai, Nong Chik district, Pattani province.

== Organization ==
=== 15th Infantry Division Headquarters ===
- 15th Infantry Division
  - 151st Infantry Regiment
    - 1st Infantry Battalion
    - 2nd Infantry Battalion
    - 3rd Infantry Battalion
  - 152nd Infantry Regiment
    - 1st Infantry Battalion
    - 2nd Infantry Battalion
    - 3rd Infantry Battalion
  - 153rd Infantry Regiment
    - 1st Infantry Battalion
    - 2nd Infantry Battalion
    - 3rd Infantry Battalion
  - Support Service Regiment
    - Logistic and Service Battalion
    - Maintenance Battalion
    - Medical Battalion
    - Psychological Operations Company
  - 15th Combat Engineer Battalion
  - 15th Military Intelligence Battalion (founded in 2008 by Army Order 95/50)
  - 15th Signal Corp Battalion
  - 31st Cavalry Squadron
  - 15th Long Range Reconnaissance Patrols Company

== See also ==
- 1st Division (Thailand)
- 2nd Infantry Division (Thailand)
- 4th Infantry Division (Thailand)
- 5th Infantry Division (Thailand)
- 7th Infantry Division (Thailand)
- 9th Infantry Division (Thailand)
- Royal Thai Marine Corps
- King's Guard (Thailand)
- Royal Thai Army
- Thai Royal Guards parade
