= 2nd Infantry Division (Thailand) =

Royal Thai Army formation

2nd Infantry Division, King's Guard
- กองพลทหารราบที่ 2 รักษาพระองค์
- Emblem of the 2nd Infantry Division, Queen Sirikit's Guard
- Active: 1910-present
- Country: Thailand
- Branch: Royal Thai Army
- Type: Mechanized infantry
- Size: Division
- Part of: First Army Area
- Garrison/HQ: Fort Promyothee, Prachinburi, Thailand
- Nicknames: Nakrob Burapha (นักรบบูรพา, Eastern warriors); Burapha Payak (บูรพาพยัคฆ์, Eastern tigers)
- Mottos: Ready for battle and Graceful
- Engagements: World War II; Franco-Thai War; Pacific War; Burma campaign; Cold War; Communist insurgency in Thailand; Vietnamese border raids in Thailand; Khmer Rouge insurgency; South Thailand insurgency; Cambodian–Thai border dispute; 2008–2011 Cambodia–Thailand border crisis; 2025 Cambodia–Thailand conflict
- Website: 2id.rta.mi.th/2id/

The 2nd Infantry Division, King's Guard (Thai: กองพลทหารราบที่ 2 รักษาพระองค์) (พล.๒ รอ.) also known as Mechanized Infantry Division (Thai: กองพลทหารราบยานเกราะ) is the King's Guard Mechanized Infantry Division of the Royal Thai Army (RTA). It is currently part of the First Army Area. The division was founded by King Chulalongkorn (Rama V) in 1910. In 1988 the division was designated a King's Guard unit by cabinet order, however, as a mark of distinction the division and all its subsidiary units were put under the patronage of Queen Sirikit and has since been known as the Queen's Guard until 2026.

The division is composed of three infantry regiments and three attached units, the 2nd Infantry Regiment, Queen's Guard, the 12th Infantry Regiment, Queen's Guard, and the 21st Infantry Regiment, Queen's Guard. The division and its subsidiary units are all based east of Bangkok, headquartered in Prachinburi, with other units in Chonburi and Sa Kaeo.

== History ==
The 2nd Infantry Division was formed in 1910 at the command of King Chulalongkorn, as a part of the newly reorganised Siamese army. After the Siamese revolution of 1932 the new administration temporarily dissolved all formations above battalion level, including the 2nd Infantry Division. During the Franco-Thai War of 1940-1941, the division's former components were incorporated into the Burapha Army (Eastern army), as the 2nd Division on the orders of Field Marshal Plaek Phibunsongkhram. The division remained part of the army during the Burma Campaign and supported the Phayap Army's invasion of the Shan States. After the end of the war the division was once again dissolved in 1946, this time due to budget cuts. Its headquarters was absorbed into the 2nd Infantry Regiment.

In 1974 the 2nd Division was reconstituted as part of the First Army Area. During the Cold War the division defended the Thai border against Vietnamese incursions and the suppression of domestic communist agitations. The division saw action in at least four border raids by Vietnamese or Kampuchea troops, in 1975, 1978-1979, 1983, and 1984-1985.

On 19 August 1988, the 2nd Infantry Division was designated a King's Guard unit by cabinet order (นร.020/14747). However, as a mark of special distinction the 2nd Infantry Division and all its subsidiary units were put under the royal patronage of Queen Sirikit and has since been known as Queen's Guard.

On 3 February 2026, the units have been renamed and become King's guard.

== Mission ==
- Protect and preserve the sovereignty of the nation.
- Protection of the Thai Royal Family.
- Spearheaded the combat in battlefield.

== Composition ==
Locations of main units of the 2nd Infantry Division, King's Guard

=== 2nd Infantry Division, King's Guard Headquarters. ===
- 2nd Infantry Division, King's Guard
  - 2nd Infantry Regiment, King's Guard - (aka "Burapha Payak" Thai: บูรพาพยัคฆ์: Eastern tigers)
    - 1st Infantry Battalion, King's Guard
    - 2nd Infantry Battalion, King's Guard
    - 3rd Infantry Battalion, King's Guard
  - 12th Infantry Regiment, King's Guard
    - 1st Infantry Battalion, King's Guard
    - 2nd Infantry Battalion, King's Guard
    - 3rd Infantry Battalion, King's Guard
  - 902 Infantry Regiment, King Vajiralongkorn's Guard - (aka "Thahan Suea Rachini" Thai: ทหารเสือราชินี: the queen's tiger soldiers)
    - 1st Infantry Battalion, King Vajiralongkorn's Guard
    - 2nd Infantry Battalion, King Vajiralongkorn's Guard
    - 3rd Infantry Battalion, King Vajiralongkorn's Guard
  - 2nd Field Artillery Regiment, King's Guard
    - 2nd Field Artillery Battalion, King's Guard
    - 12th Field Artillery Battalion, King's Guard
    - 902 Field Artillery Battalion, King's Guard
    - 102nd Field Artillery Battalion, King's Guard
  - 2nd Service Support Regiment
    - Logistic Battalion
  - 2nd Cavalry Squadron
  - 30th Cavalry Squadron
  - 2nd Signal Corp Battalion
  - 2nd Combat Engineer Battalion
  - 2nd Medical Battalion
  - 2nd Anti-tank Company
  - 12th Military Police Battalion
  - 2nd Long Range Reconnaissance Patrols Company
  - 12th Military Circle
  - 14th Military Circle
  - 18th Military Circle
  - 19th Military Circle

== See also ==
- 1st Division (Thailand)
- 4th Infantry Division (Thailand)
- 5th Infantry Division (Thailand)
- 7th Infantry Division (Thailand)
- 9th Infantry Division (Thailand)
- 15th Infantry Division (Thailand)
- King's Guard (Thailand)
- Royal Thai Army
