= Royal Thai Army Expeditionary Division =

Thai military unit

Royal Thai Army Volunteer Force
- RTAVF emblem
- Country: Thailand
- Branch: Royal Thai Army
- Type: Infantry
- Size: Division
- Part of: Royal Thai Armed Forces
- Nickname: Black Panther
- Engagements: Vietnam War

The Royal Thai Army Volunteer Force (Thai: กองพลทหารอาสาสมัคร), or the Black Panthers (กองพลเสือดำ) was a combined infantry unit of the Royal Thai Army (RTA) which served in the Vietnam War, replacing the Royal Thai Volunteer Regiment (RTVR) aka Queen's Cobras in 1968.

== Deployment ==
Even before all elements of the RTVR had arrived in South Vietnam, efforts were being made to increase again the size of the Thai contribution. By mid-1967 the Thai government had unilaterally begun consideration of the deployment of additional forces to South Vietnam. On 8 September the Thai government submitted a request for extensive military assistance to the American Embassy in Bangkok. Specific items in the request were related directly to the provision of an additional army force for South Vietnam. The Thai Prime Minister proposed a one brigade group at a strength of 10,800 men. This organization was to be composed of three infantry battalions, one artillery battalion, one engineer battalion and other supporting units as required.

The deployment of the new headquarters began with the arrival of the advance party on 1 July 1968 and was completed on 15 July. The troops quickly followed. The first 5,700-man increment of the division, now known as the Black Panther Division arrived in South Vietnam in late July 1968 and was deployed in the Bearcat Base area. The second increment of 5,704 men began deployment in January 1969 and completed the move on 25 February. This increment contained the division headquarters and headquarters company (rear), the 2nd Infantry Brigade of 3 infantry battalions, 2 artillery battalions and the remainder of the division combat service support elements. The division was under the operational control of the Commanding General, II Field Force, Vietnam. The third increment was deployed to South Vietnam during July and August to replace the first increment, which returned to Thailand. The last of the third increment arrived at Bearcat on 12 August 1969. The replacement brigade assumed the designation of 1st Brigade. In addition, the headquarters of the Royal Thai Army Volunteer Force (RTAVF) completed its annual rotation.

In November 1970 the Thai government announced it was planning to withdraw its forces from South Vietnam by 1972. The decision was related to the deterioration of security in Laos and Cambodia and the growth of internal insurgency in Thailand, as well as the ongoing U.S. withdrawal of forces. The withdrawal plans were based on a rotational phase-out. The fifth increment would not be replaced after its return to Thailand in August 1971. The sixth increment would deploy as planned in January 1971 and withdraw one year later to complete the redeployment. On 26 March 1971 the Thai government announced to the United States and South Vietnam that half of the Division would be withdrawn in July 1971, and the remaining half in February 1972 in line with their earlier proposals.

Following its return from South Vietnam the division was renamed the 9th Infantry Division based at (Fort Surasi, Kanchanaburi Province).

== Organization ==
=== Royal Thai Army Expeditionary Division Headquarters ===
- Royal Thai Army Expeditionary Division
  - HQ Company
  - 1st Infantry Regiment
    - 1st Infantry Battalion
    - 2nd Infantry Battalion
    - 3rd Infantry Battalion
  - 2nd Infantry Regiment
    - 1st Infantry Battalion
    - 2nd Infantry Battalion
    - 3rd Infantry Battalion
  - 105th Field Artillery Regiment
    - 1st Field Artillery Battalion
    - 2nd Field Artillery Battalion
  - 155th Field Artillery Regiment
    - 1st Field Artillery Battalion
  - Maintenance Battalion
  - Combat Medical Battalion
  - Cavalry Squadron
  - Combat Engineer Battalion
  - Signal Corp Battalion
  - Long Range Reconnaissance Patrols Company
  - Military Police Company
  - Combat Aviation Company
  - Transportation Company

== Lineage and honors ==
Conflict/Decoration	Streamer/Device	Inscription
Meritorious Unit Commendation		VIETNAM 1968–1969
Gallantry Cross Unit Citation		HÀNH QUÂN LỘC AN LONG THÀNH 1969
Civil Actions Unit Citation		DÂN SỰ VỤ 1968–1969
