= Royal Thai Volunteer Regiment =

Seal of Royal Thai Volunteer Regiment

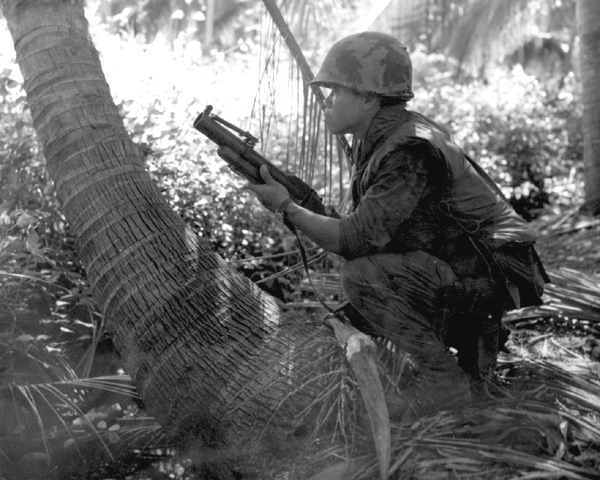
Queen's Cobras M79 grenadier in Phuoc Tho in 1967

The Royal Thai Volunteer Regiment (Thai: กรมทหารอาสาสมัคร), or the Queen's Cobras (จงอางศึก) was a combined force unit of the Royal Thai Armed Forces (RTARF) which served in the Vietnam War. The unit of some 2,000 troops served alongside the American 9th Infantry Division from 1967–1968, when they were replaced by the Royal Thai Army Expeditionary Division ("Black Panthers").

== Organisation ==
Organizationally, the unit consisted of a headquarters company with a communications platoon, an aviation platoon, an M113 armored personnel carrier platoon, a psychological operations platoon, a heavy weapons platoon with a machine gun section, and a four-tube 81mm mortar section; a service company consisting of a personnel and special services platoon and supply and transport, maintenance, and military police platoons; four rifle companies; a reinforced engineer combat company; a medical company: a cavalry reconnaissance troop of two reconnaissance platoons and an M113 platoon; and a six-tube 105mm howitzer battery.

== Vietnam deployment ==
The deployment of the regiment to South Vietnam was divided into four phases. Acting as the regiment's quartering party, the engineer company left Bangkok by Royal Thai Navy Landing Ship, Tank (LST) on 11 July 1967 and arrived at Newport Army Terminal on 15 July. After unloading its equipment the company traveled by convoy to Bearcat Base, where it began work on the base camp. The advance party traveled by air to Bearcat on 20 August. The main body of the Regiment arrived during the period 19–23 September 1967. The last unit to arrive was the APC platoon, which had completed its training on 25 September and was airlifted to South Vietnam on 28 November.

The area of operations assigned to the Thais was characterized by a low level of Viet Cong (VC) action because the land was used by the VC primarily as a source of food and clothing. Moving constantly and constructing new base camps, the VC had little time for offensive action. As a result, VC operations conducted in the Thai area were not as significant as elsewhere.

Following a series of small unilateral and larger combined operations with Vietnamese units, the regiment launched Operation Narasuan in October 1967. In this, their first largescale separate operation, they assisted in the pacification of the Nhơn Trạch District of Bien Hoa Province, killing 145 VC. The Thais built a hospital, constructed 48 kilometers of new roads, and treated nearly 49,000 civilian patients through their medical units.

On 25 June at 07:55 two UH-1 Iroquois collided 4 miles (6.4 km) west of Bearcat Base killing 12 U.S. Army personnel, 16 Thai soldiers and one ARVN soldier.

== Lineage and honors ==
Conflict/Decoration	Streamer/Device	Inscription
Army Meritorious Unit Commendation		VIETNAM 1967 – 1968
