= Bearcat Base =

Former U.S. Army base in southern Vietnam

Bearcat Base (Long Thanh North Airfield)
- Biên Hòa, Đồng Nai province in Vietnam
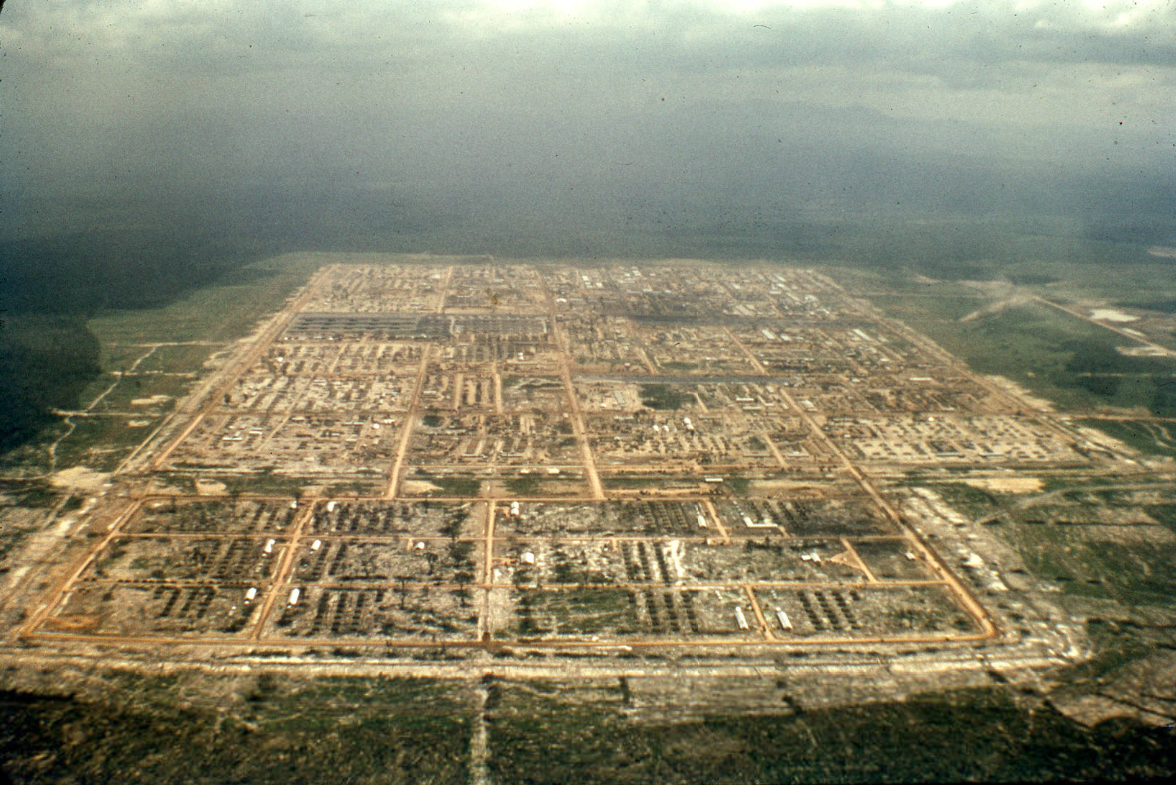
- Bearcat Base, 26 September 1967

Site information
- Operator: Army of the Republic of Vietnam (ARVN); United States Army (U.S. Army)
- Condition: Abandoned

Location
- Shown within Vietnam
- Coordinates: 10.835°N 106.96°E

Site history
- Built: 1960
- In use: 1960-1972
- Battles/wars: Vietnam War

Garrison information
- Garrison: 9th Infantry Division; Royal Thai Volunteer Regiment; Royal Thai Army Expeditionary Division

Airfield information
- Elevation: 140 feet (43 m) AMSL
Runways
Direction	Length and surface
05/23	5,000 feet (1,524 m) Asphalt

Bearcat Base (also known as Bearcat, Camp Martin, Camp Cox or Long Thanh North) is a former U.S. Army base near the city of Biên Hòa in Đồng Nai province in southern Vietnam.

== History ==
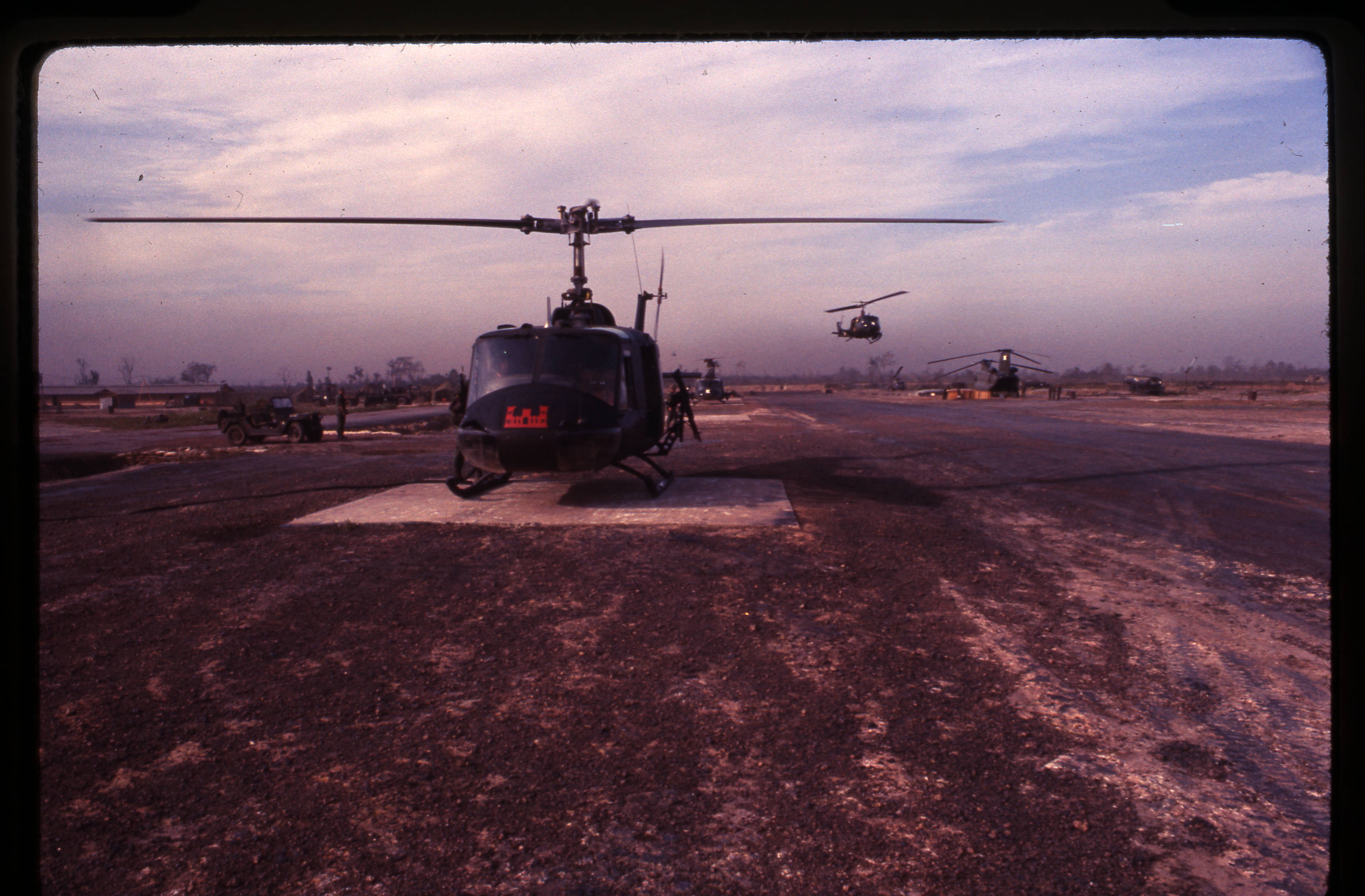
Long Thanh helicopters, 27 January 1967

Bearcat was originally a French airfield, later used by the Japanese during World War II. Early in the Vietnam War, the 1st Special Forces established a base there. It was later the base camp for the 9th Infantry Division from January 1967 until the division moved to Đồng Tâm Base Camp near Mỹ Tho in late 1967. The camp was located on Route 15, 16 km southeast of Biên Hòa. The camp took its name from its Special Forces radio call sign. Other U.S. units stationed at Bearcat included:

- 7th Battalion, 8th Artillery (June–October 1967)
- 7th Battalion, 9th Artillery (November 1966–August 1969)
- 1st Battalion, 11th Artillery (January 1967–1968)
- 5th Battalion, 42nd Artillery (1968)
- 1st Battalion, 84th Artillery (February 1967–1968)
- 2nd Brigade, 1st Infantry Division comprising:
  - 1st Battalion, 16th Infantry (June 1967, February 1970)
  - 2nd Battalion, 16th Infantry (January–February 1970)
  - 1st Battalion, 18th Infantry (January 1970)
  - 2nd Battalion, 18th Infantry (January–February 1970)
- 3rd Brigade, 4th Infantry Division comprising:
  - 2nd Battalion, 12th Infantry (October–November 1966)
  - 3rd Battalion, 22nd Infantry (October–November 1966)
- 2nd Battalion, 47th Infantry (March–July 1968)1

Bearcat also served as the base for the Royal Thai Army Expeditionary Division forces from 1968.

Long Thanh North Airfield

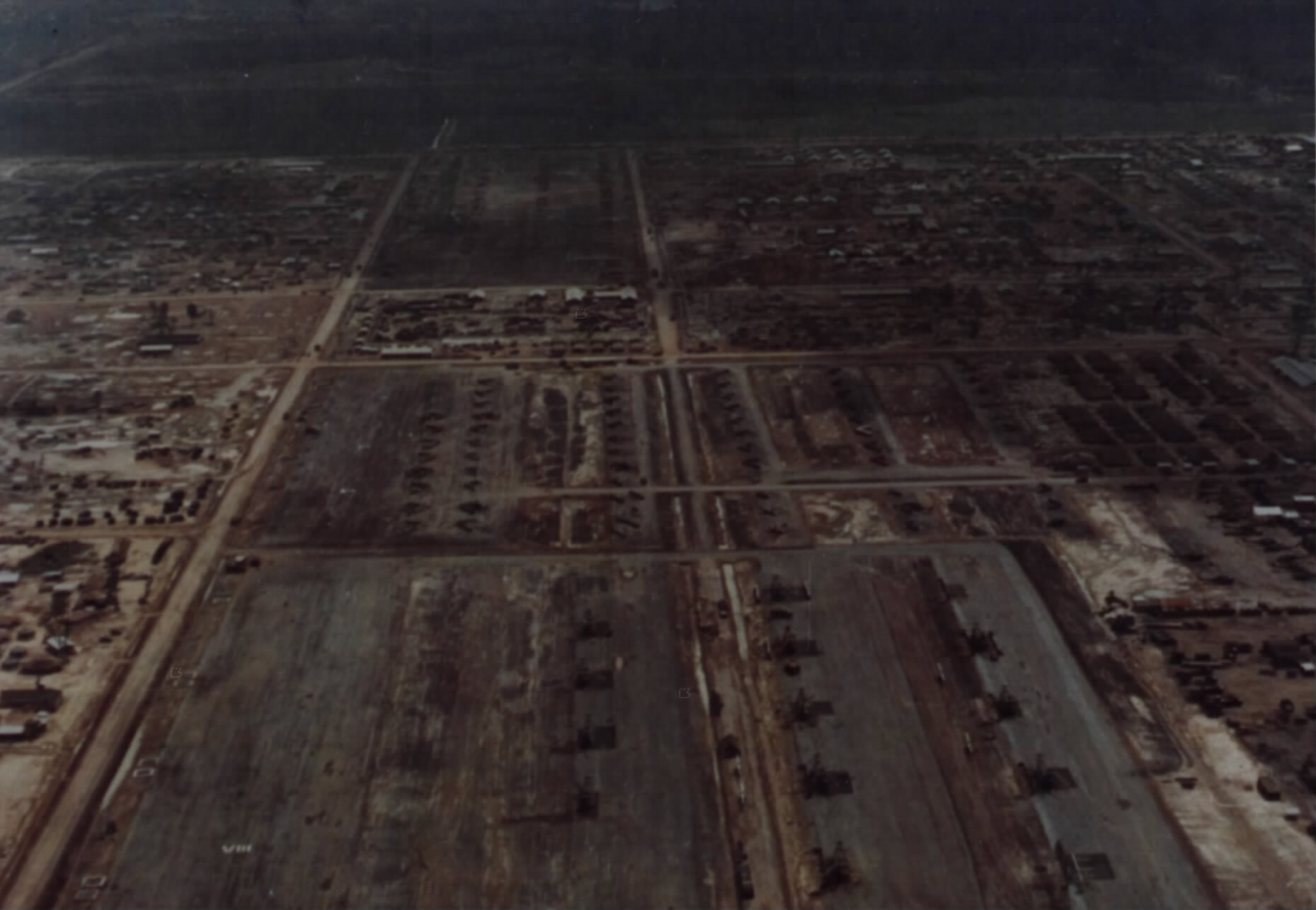
Long Thanh Army Airfield, July 1967

Aviation paragraph.

- 210th Aviation Battalion (January 1968-August 1971)
  - 25th Aviation Company (February 1968-July 1971)
  - 54th Aviation Company (January 1968-March 1971)
  - 73rd Aviation Company (January 1968-May 1970)
  - 74th Aviation Company (January 1968-July 1971)
  - 120th Aviation Company (January 1968-April 1969)
  - 125th Aviation Company (January 1968-March 1968)
  - 184th Aviation Company (January 1968-July 1971)
- 214th Aviation Battalion (January 1967-November 1968)
  - 191st Assault Helicopter Company (May 1967-late 1968 when it moved to Dong Tam to support the 9th Infantry)
  - 200th Aviation Company (March 1967–July 1968)
  - 240th Aviation Company (May 1967–December 1971)
- 135th Aviation Company (January-unknown 1968)
- 244th Aviation Company (August–December 1971)
- 56th Transportation Company, 765th Transportation Battalion

== ARVN use ==
In 1972 the Army of the Republic of Vietnam infantry school and armor school began moving to Bearcat Base from Thủ Đức.

== Current use ==
The base was abandoned and turned over to farmland although the Long Thanh North airfield is clearly visible on satellite images.
