= 2010–2012 Myanmar border clashes =

Internal conflict in Myanmar

- Part of the internal conflict in Myanmar and the Karen conflict
Date	7 November 2010 – 12 January 2012 (1 year, 2 months and 5 days)
Location	Myanmar-Thailand border, Kayin State, Myanmar: Kawkareik; Myawaddy; Three Pagodas Pass
Result	Ceasefire

Belligerents
Myanmar	DKBA-5; Karen National Union

Commanders and leaders
Than Shwe; Min Aung Hlaing	Saw Lah Pwe; Saw Kyaw Thet †

Units involved
Tatmadaw: Military Operations Command 19	Karen National Liberation Army

Strength
~250	~300

Casualties and losses
43 killed, 63 wounded	Unknown
- Civilians: 3 killed, 24 wounded At least 20,000 refugees fled to neighbouring Thailand

The 2010–2012 Myanmar border clashes were a series of skirmishes between the Tatmadaw (Myanmar Armed Forces) on one side, and the DKBA-5 and the Karen National Liberation Army (KNLA) on the other. The clashes erupted along the border with Thailand shortly after Myanmar's general election on 7 November 2010. An estimated 10,000 refugees have fled into nearby neighbouring Thailand to escape the violent conflict. There was concern that due to discontent with the elections, and speculations of electoral fraud, that the conflict could escalate into a civil war.

== Timeline ==
=== June 2010 ===
- 12 June. KNLA kill 12 troops.

=== October 2010 ===
- 1 October. Fighting erupted yesterday between Burmese troops and a breakaway Shan force only hours after a Burmese soldier died following an ambush by a Karen army.
- 19 October. 4,000 troops of the KNLA are now on high alert.

=== 8–9 November 2010 ===
The fighting started in the town of Myawaddy, in Karen State, on 8 November. The government deployed heavy artillery in the town in response to the presence of forces from the renegade DKBA brigade. The military had allegedly threatened to shoot people who refused to vote. There were also clashes near Three Pagodas Pass. It is believed at least three people were killed and twenty wounded when a Burmese Army artillery shell landed in a market in the centre of Myawaddy. At least five Thai civilians were injured when a rocket propelled grenade exploded in the town of Mae Sot, on the border between Thailand and Burma.

It is estimated that at least 10,000 refugees have fled into Thailand to escape the violence. DKBA rebels took the town of Myawaddy on 9 November, and were holding it against government forces. The town was closed off, and information on further casualties remains unavailable.

According to Thai sources, the Tatmadaw recaptured the majority of the town later in the evening, after an earlier battle between troops and DKBA forces. By the following morning only a few areas remained under rebel control. The Thai military, who are supervising the thousands of refugees, announced that it would send the refugees back over the border once the situation in the town had calmed down.

By the middle of 9 November, reports emerged that government troops had fully retaken the town, and pushed rebel troops back into the forests. Thai Officials were preparing to start moving the estimated 15,000 refugees back over the border.

Late on Tuesday 9 November, refugees started moving back over the river from Thailand, with the government claiming that its forces had quelled the violence, and that DKBA fighters were no longer present in the town. It is believed between five and ten civilians were killed during the fighting. However, neither the government nor DKBA fighters have released any information on the numbers of casualties from the fighting.

=== 10 November onwards ===
By November skirmishes between rebel forces and government troops were continuing around the Three Pagodas Pass area. The next day, both sides continued small skirmishes with both sides exchanging rocket fire. DKBA forces allegedly briefly took control of the town of Payathonsu, however government forces drove the rebels out. According to a Thai official, at least 30 rockets were fired by both sides between 4 and 6 am. Both belligerents are believed to have reinforced their numbers over the last few days. The DKBA rebel, Waw Lay base was also destroyed by Government forces after a heavy artillery bombardment.

On 12 November, Al-Jazeera English reported that the DKBA had joined forces with the Karen National Liberation Army to counter an expected crackdown by the government. Fighting then erupted again as both sides exchanged rocket fire. During the fighting a RPG exploded near Tinetayar Monastery, wounding 3 civilians who were taken to a nearby hospital.

Fighting flared up once more on the evening of 14 November with DKBA forces once more exchanging Mortar and small arms fire with Government troops. The fresh outburst of violence sent at least 200 civilians fleeing across the border into Thailand Thai officials were keen to start sending the refugees back over the border as soon as the violence died down.

On the 27th DKBA forces ambushed government troops reportedly killed One soldier and wounding 8. Government forces used 81-millimetre shells against rebel forces during the attack, however no rebel casualties have been announced. The fighting sent a reported 1,000 civilians over the border once more into Thailand.

=== 2011 clashes ===
==== January ====
Fighting spilled over into the new year when DKBA and Government forces exchanged yet another large burst of rocket and artillery fire on 1 January. Two Thai Army soldiers who were patrolling the Thai side of the border were wounded when misguided 120mm artillery fire landed near their patrol vehicle which was destroyed. Several Government troops were also reported wounded when their Army truck ran over an IED.

Gun battles were exchanged between Junta troops and DKBA personnel between 26 and 27 January. According to DKBA sources 26 Junta soldiers were killed and 35 wounded during the fighting. At least 200 more refugees have fled over the Thai border and have taken refuge in the Thai Phop Phra District. DKBA forces accused the Thai Army of allowing Burmese troops to cross into Thai territory to attack Brigade 5 from Thai soil. Thai military officials have made no comment on the matter.

==== February ====
For the first time in over 10 years the Kachin Independence Organisation (KIO) had an armed clash with Government Troops, reportedly wounding a battalion commander as well as several other soldiers. The KIO said that junta troops, led by battalion commander Lieutenant Colonel Yin Htwe, intruded into a KIO-controlled area, which started the fighting. Yin Htwe's condition was unknown. The fighting lasted for approximately 20 minutes before government troops withdrew. According to the KIO, the two sides last fought in April 1997 near Nammatee in Kachin State.

==== March ====
The KNLA ambushed a convoy of 27 trucks carrying more than 300 troops between Kanelay and Bayintnaung in the Waw Lay area killing 16 and wounding 17.

From the period 1 January to 31 March 2011, the KNLA was involved in 526 clashes with the Myanmar Army.

==== April ====
15 April: The conflict escalates from Three Pagodas Pass to Shan State.

==== May ====
2 May: Clash between the Burmese military troops and the Karenni soldiers near Daw Ta Naw village.

3 May: Clashes between the Burmese military troops and an alliance of the Democratic Karen Buddhist Army (DKBA) and Karen National Liberation Army (KNLA) in Kyarinnseikgyi township.

==== June ====
12 June: Clashes between the Burmese military troops and the Kachin Independence Army (KIA) at Sang Gang, Kachin State, Northern Burma.

13 June: The KIA declared a state of war.

==== July ====
2 July: Kler Day road, Karen State. A Myanmar army battalion commander killed and another company commander and a sergeant wounded.

7 July: After a break starts KIA fighting again.

8 July: Infantry Battalion (IB) No. 62 based in Thanphyuzayart, between Three Pagodas Pass and Moulmein expect an attack from KNLA.

==== September ====
Myanmar border clashes intensify.

24–26 September: Four days as heavy fighting by KIA

==== November ====
The government and the Karen National Union agreed to talks aimed at negotiating a ceasefire and eventual lasting peace.

== Economic impact ==
The recent clashes which have occurred on the Thai-Myanmar border are nothing new to the Thai border village of Mae Sot. However the fighting which has erupted near the town since the 2010 Myanmar elections has been causing a significant impact in the trade between Thailand and Myanmar due to the border being closed. Trade between the two countries brings in approximately 30 to 36 billion baht annually.

== International reactions ==
- United Nations – Secretary-General Ban Ki-moon expressed concern about reported clashes between government troops and ethnic rebels "and urged all sides to refrain from any action that could raise tensions further or create instability at this sensitive time."
- Australia – The Australian Greens party has called for a full trade embargo against Myanmar in the wake of the election and resulting violence.
- Canada – The Department of Foreign affairs announced that they would work with Canadian Friends of Burma to help send aid to refugees affected and displaced by the fighting.
- Thailand – The Thai government called for both sides to show restraint and be careful when firing weapons, as it was revealed several M79 Grenades landed on the Thai side of the border.
