= Royal Thai Army =

National army of Thailand

- กองทัพบกไทย
- Emblem of the Royal Thai Army
- Founded: 8 May 1874 (152 years)
- Country: Thailand
- Allegiance: King of Thailand
- Branch: Army
- Type: Army
- Role: Land warfare
- Size: 245,000
- Part of: Royal Thai Armed Forces And Royal Thai Armed Forces Headquarters
- HQ: Royal Thai Army Headquarters, Ratchadamnoen Avenue, Phra Nakhon, Bangkok
- Nickname: "ทบ." "Thor Bor" Abbreviation of Army
- Patron: King of Thailand
- Mottos: เพื่อชาติ ศาสน์ กษัตริย์ และประชาชน ("For the Nation, Religion, Monarchy, and People")
- Colours: Red and yellow
- March: มาร์ชกองทัพบก (Army March)
- Mascots: Tiger for Royal Thai Army Ranger and 2nd Infantry Division (Thailand), Panther for 9th Infantry Division (Thailand)
- Anniversaries: 18 January (Royal Thai Armed Forces Day)
- Engagements: Franco-Siamese War; World War I; World War II; Franco-Thai War; Burma Campaign; Pacific War; Cold War; Korean War; Third Battle of Seoul; Battle of Pork Chop Hill; Vietnam War; Tet Offensive; Battle of Hat Dich; Operation Toan Thang I; Operation Toan Thang II; Operation Toan Thang III; Laotian Civil War; Communist insurgency in Thailand; Internal conflict in Myanmar; Maw Pokay incident; Operation Border Post 9631; Vietnamese border raids in Thailand; Battle of Chong Bok; Khmer Rouge insurgency; Thai–Laotian Border War; Thai political crisis; March 1977 Thai coup d'état attempt; 1981 Thai military rebellion; 1991 Thai coup d'état; Black May (1992); 1999 East Timorese crisis; International Force East Timor; South Thailand insurgency; Global War on Terrorism; Iraq War; Cambodia-Thailand border dispute; 2008-2011 Cambodia-Thailand border crisis; 2025 Cambodian-Thai border crisis
- Website: rta.mi.th

Commanders
- Commander-in-chief: General Phana Khlaeoplotthuk

Insignia
- Royal Thai Army Flag

- Unit colour

- Aircraft symbol

The Royal Thai Army or RTA (Thai: กองทัพบกไทย; RTGS: kong thap bok thai) is the army of Thailand and the oldest and largest branch of the Royal Thai Armed Forces.

== History ==
=== Origin ===
The Royal Thai Army is responsible for protecting the kingdom's sovereignty. The army was formed in 1874, partly as a response to new security threats following the 1855 Bowring Treaty with the United Kingdom, which opened the country for international trade.

=== Current ===
In the modern era, the army has a long history of coups d'état and coup attempts. Its leadership continues to see coup-making as one role of the army.

On 22 May 2014, the army deposed the government, appointed military officers to the national assembly, and on 21 August 2014, they elected the army's Commander in Chief, General Prayut Chan-o-cha, as prime minister. The general retired October 2014 to concentrate on political reform which he said would take at least a year, following which he promised that national elections would be held.

The existence of an information warfare unit participating in a cyber campaign against government critics was leaked to the public in late February 2020. In 2020, Twitter shut down a network of accounts which were engaged in information warfare. According to Twitter, "Our investigation uncovered a network of accounts partaking in information operations that we can reliably link to the Royal Thai Army (RTA)." The operation had targeted the political opposition within Thailand. The Thai Army denied that they had been involved in the disinformation operation.

=== Army components and control ===
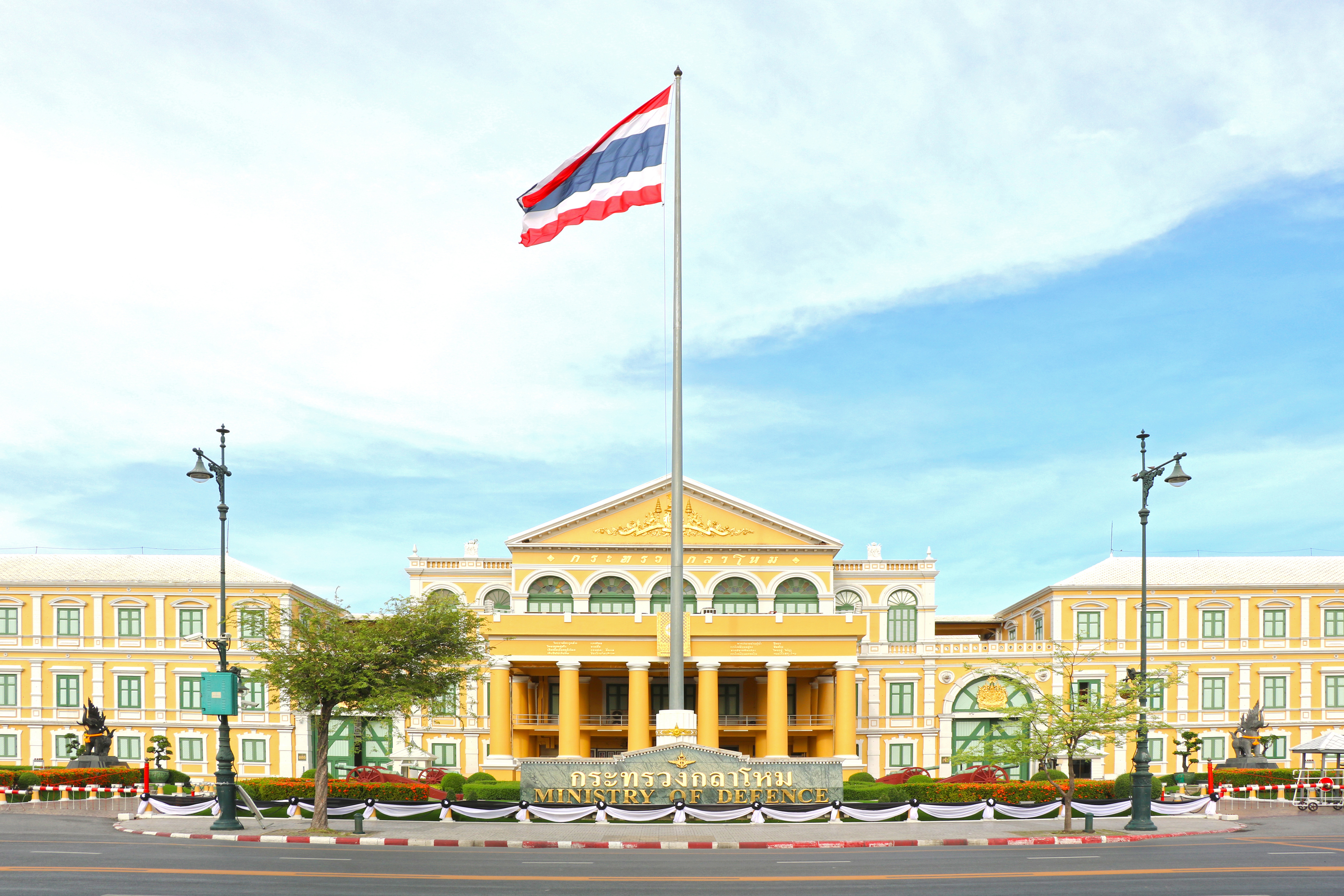
The Ministry of Defence, Bangkok

The number of Thai Army generals is unclear. One point of comparison: as of 1 November 2019, the US Army had 322 general officers for a force of 471,990 troops. Saiyud Kerdphol was Thailand's oldest general, a veteran of World War II and Korea who retired in 1983 as supreme commander. During his tenure, general officer numbers were based on the number of troops under their command. As of 2019, only 150–200 four-star generals occupy command positions. Speaking on the topic of army manpower, Saiyud declared that, "Everybody being a general is unbelievable. Full generals don't have a seat to sit in or a job to do."

=== Command and control ===
The commander-in-chief of the Royal Thai Army (ผู้บัญชาการทหารบกไทย) is considered the most powerful position in the Royal Thai Armed Forces. Since 1 October 2024, the commander-in-chief has been General Phana Khlaeoplotthuk.

- Commander-in-Chief: General Phana Khlaeoplotthuk since 1 October 2024
- Deputy Commander-in-Chief: General Nattawut Nakanakorn since 1 October 2024
- Chairman of the Royal Thai Army Advisory Board: General Ekkarat Changkaew since 1 October 2024
- Assistant Commander-in-Chief: General Wasu Jiamsuk since 1 October 2024
- Assistant Commander-in-Chief: General Chitsanupong Rodsiri since 1 October 2024
- Chief of Staff of the Army: General Thongchai Rodyoi since 1 October 2024
- Commander of the 1st Army Area: Lieutenant General Amrit Boonsuya since 1 October 2024
- Commander of the 2nd Army Area: Lieutenant General Boonsin Padklang since 1 October 2024
- Commander of the 3rd Army Area: Lieutenant General Kittipong Chaemsuwan since 1 October 2024
- Commander of the 4th Army Area: Lieutenant General Paisan Nusang since 1 October 2024
- Commander of the Royal Thai Army Special Warfare Command: Lieutenant General Narongrit Kamphira since 1 October 2024

== Structure ==
The army is organized nationally into four army areas:

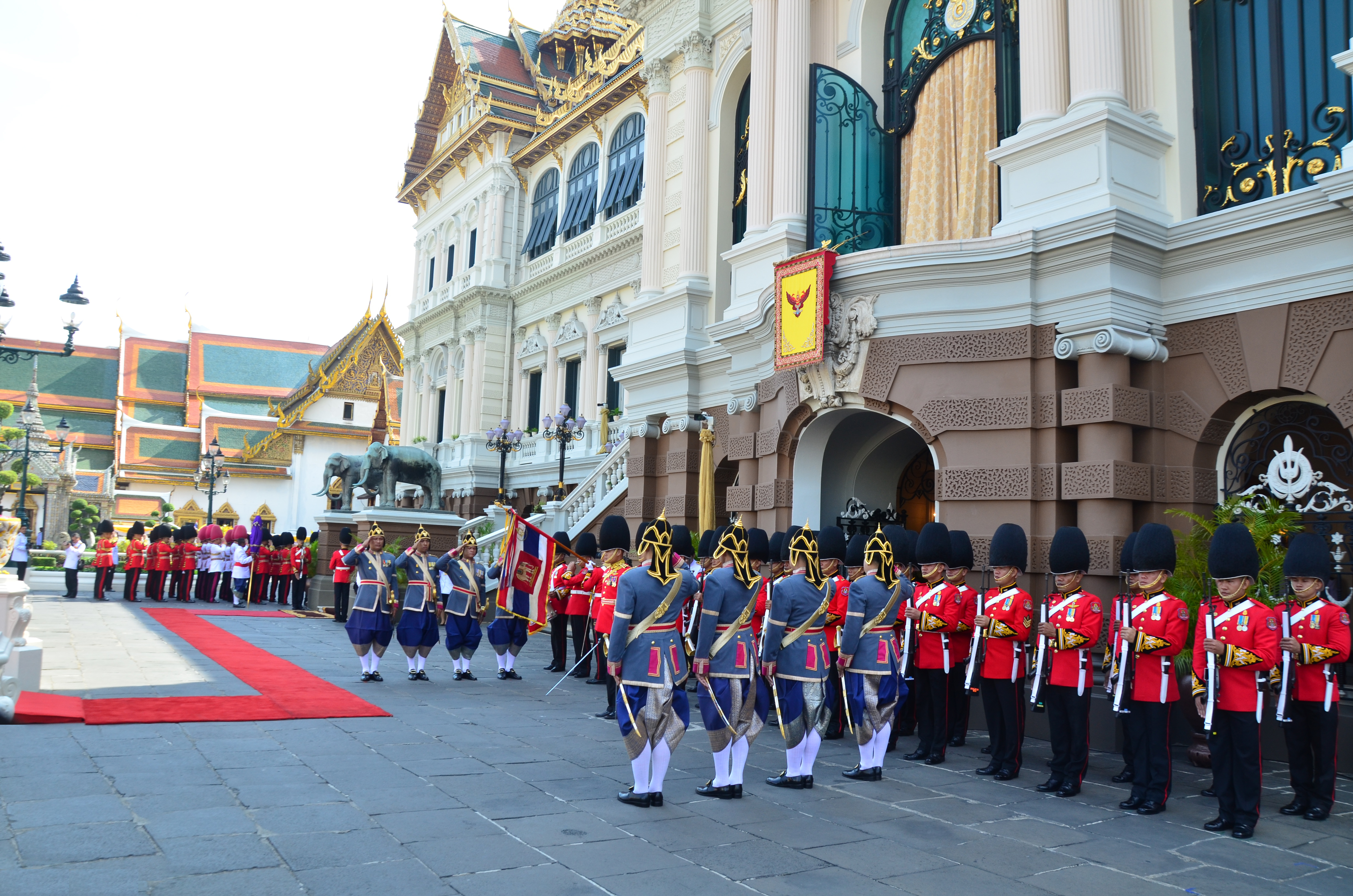
King's Guard at Grand Palace

Locations of the army's major units in Bangkok
Locations of the army's major units in Thailand

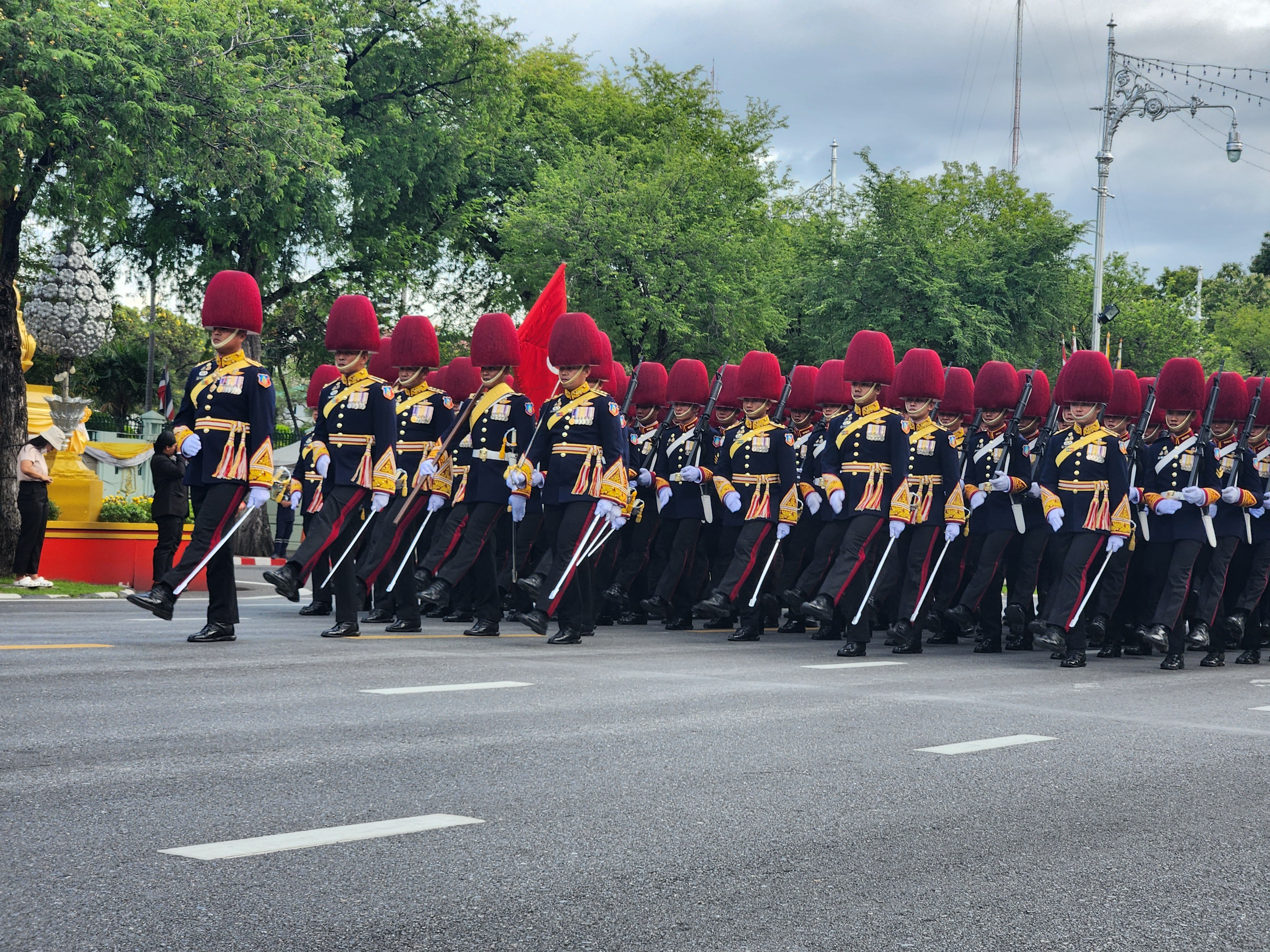
31st Infantry Brigade, King's Guard

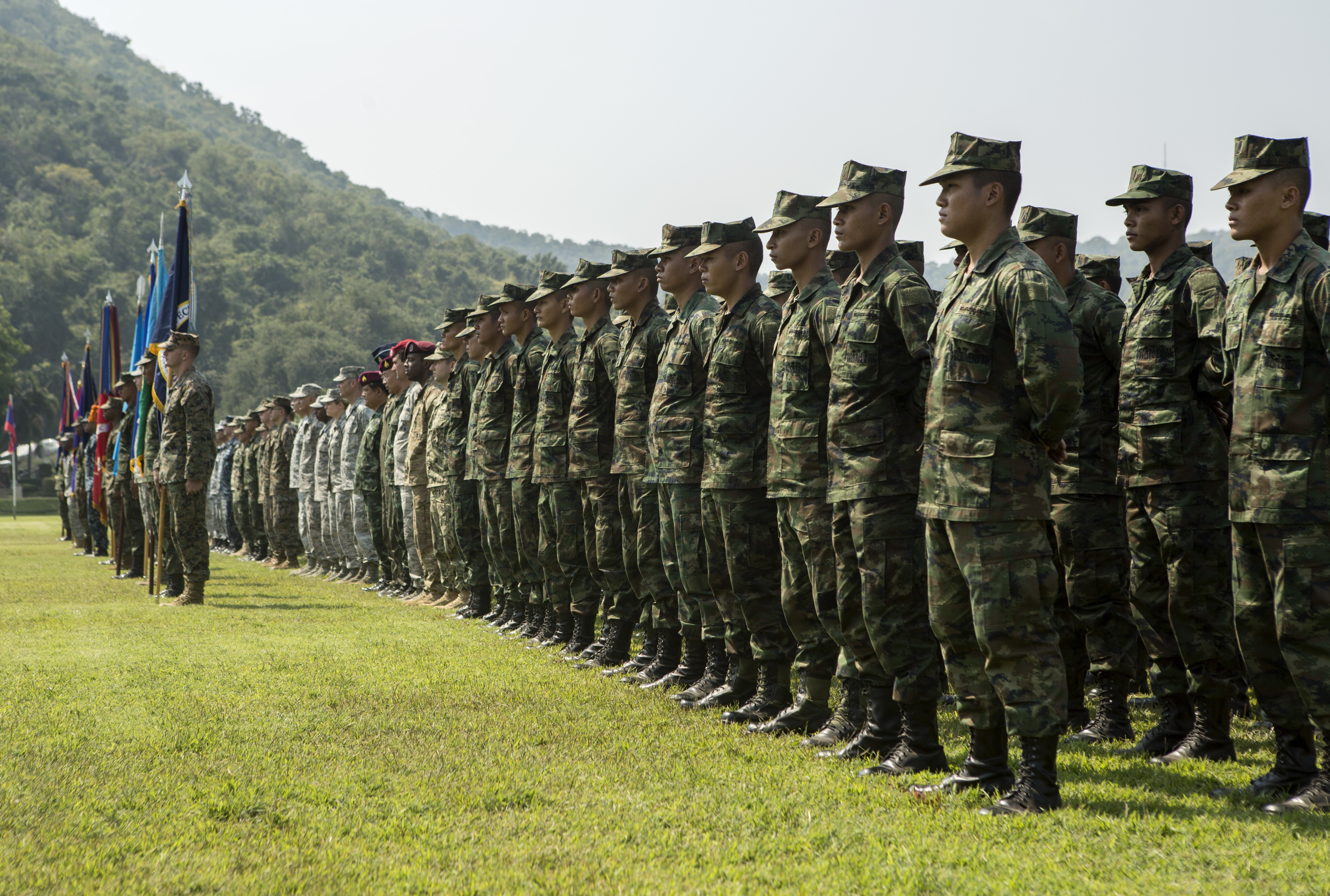
Royal Thai Army welcome members of Cobra Gold 2016

- First Army Area - (Thai: กองทัพภาคที่ 1) – headquartered in Bangkok, controls troops in 26 provinces in central, eastern, western Thailand and Bangkok.
  - Command Division - (Thai: ส่วนบัญชาการ)
    - Headquarters and Headuqarters Company
    - 21st Signal Regiment, 1st Army Area
  - Organic Units (Thai: หน่วยขึ้นตรง)
    - 1st Army Corps
      - Headquarters and Headuqarters Company
  - Combat Division - (Thai: ส่วนการรบ)
    - First Army Area Operations Center - (Thai: ศูนย์ปฏิบัติการกองทัพภาคที่ 1)
      - Burapa Command aka Burapa Task Force - (Thai: กองกำลังเฉพาะกิจบูรพา)
        - Headquarters and Service Company
        - Quick Reaction Force Company
        - Army Aviation Squad
        - Combat Engineer Team
        - Fire Support Unit
        - Military Dogs Platoon
        - Military Intelligence Operations Team
        - Military Intelligence Unit
        - Signal Corps Unit
        - 12th Ranger Forces Regiment - (Thai: กรมทหารพรานที่ 12)
        - 13th Ranger Forces Regiment - (Thai: กรมทหารพรานที่ 13)
      - Surasee Command aka Surasee Force - (Thai: กองกำลังสุรสีห์)
        - Headquarters and Service Company
        - Army Air Defence Coordination Team
        - Army Aviation Operations Team
        - Combat Engineer Team
        - Civil Affairs Coordination Team
        - Civil Affairs Operations Team
        - Heavy Weapons Platoon
        - Military Intelligence Operations Team
        - Military Intelligence Unit
        - Queen's Cobras Task Force
        - Quick Reaction Force Platoon
        - Reconnaissance Platoon
        - Royal Initiative Projects Coordination Team
        - Signal Corps Unit
        - 14th Ranger Forces Regiment - (Thai: กรมทหารพรานที่ 14)
    - 1st Special Forces Training Company - (Thai: กองร้อยฝึกรบพิเศษที่ 1)
    - 11th Ranger Forces Regiment - (Thai: กรมทหารพรานที่ 11)
    - 1st Division, King's Guard - (Thai: กองพลที่ 1 รักษาพระองค์) (Bangkok)
      - Headquarters and Service Company, 1st Division, King's Guard
      - 31st Infantry Brigade, King Bhumibol's Guard (Airborne forces and heliborne forces) - (Thai: กรมทหารราบที่ 31 รักษาพระองค์ ในพระบาทสมเด็จพระบรมชนกาธิเบศร มหาภูมิพลอดุลยเดชมหาราช บรมนาถบพิตร)
        - Headquarters and Service Company, 31st Infantry Brigade, King's Guard
          - Heavy Mortar Company
          - Reconnaissance and Surveillance Company
          - 1st Infantry Battalion, 31st Infantry Brigade, King's Guard (Airborne Infantry)
          - 2nd Infantry Battalion, 31st Infantry Brigade, King's Guard (Light infantry)
          - 3rd Infantry Battalion, 31st Infantry Brigade, King's Guard (Light infantry)
      - 1st Artillery Brigade, King's Guard - (Thai: กรมทหารปืนใหญ่ที่ 1 รักษาพระองค์)
        - Headquarter and Service Battery, 1st Artillery Brigade, King's Royal Guard
          - 1st Artillery Regiment, 1st Artillery Brigade, King's Guard
          - 11th Artillery Regiment, 1st Artillery Brigade, King's Guard
          - 31st Artillery Regiment, 1st Artillery Brigade, King's Guard
      - 1st Engineer Regiment - (Thai: กองพันทหารช่างที่ 1 กองพลที่ 1 รักษาพระองค์)
      - 1st Medical Regiment - (Thai: กองพันเสนารักษ์ที่ 1)
      - 4th Armoured Regiment, 1st Division, King's Guard - (Thai: กองพันทหารม้าที่ 4 กองพลที่ 1 รักษาพระองค์)
      - 12th Military Police Regiment (Thai: กองพันสารวัตรทหารที่ 12 กองพลที่ 1 รักษาพระองค์)
      - 1st Signal Regiment, King's Guard - (Thai: กองพันทหารสื่อสารที่ 1 รักษาพระองค์ กองพลที่ 1 รักษาพระองค์)
      - 1st Cavalry Squadron (Reconnaissance) - (Thai: กองร้อยทหารม้าลาดตระเวนที่ 1 กองพลที่ 1 รักษาพระองค์)
      - 1st Long Range Reconnaissance Company - (Thai: กองร้อยลาดตระเวนระยะไกลที่ 1 กองพลที่ 1 รักษาพระองค์)
      - 1st Ordnance Company - (Thai: กองร้อยทหารสรรพาวุธที่ 1 กองพลที่ 1 รักษาพระองค์)
      - 1st Quartermaster Company (Thai: กองร้อยพลาธิการที่ 1 กองพลที่ 1 รักษาพระองค์)
      - Airfield Service and Control Tower Team 1
    - 2nd Infantry Division, King's Guard - (Thai: th:กองพลทหารราบที่ 2 รักษาพระองค์) (Fort Phromyothi, Prachinburi Province)
      - Headquarters and Service Company, 2nd Infantry Division, King's Guard
      - 2nd Infantry Brigade, King's Guard - (Thai: กรมทหารราบที่ 2 รักษาพระองค์) - (aka "Burapha Payak" Thai: บูรพาพยัคฆ์: Eastern tigers)
        - Headquarters and Service Company, 2nd Infantry Brigade, King's Guard
        - 1st Mechanised Infantry Battalion, King's Guard
        - 2nd Infantry Battalion, King's Guard
        - 3rd Infantry Battalion, King's Guard
      - 12th Mechanised Infantry Brigade, King's Guard - (Thai: กรมทหารราบที่ 12 รักษาพระองค์)
        - Headquarters and Service Company, 12th Infantry Brigade, King's Guard
        - 1st Mechanised Infantry Battalion, King's Guard
        - 2nd Mechanised Infantry Battalion, King's Guard
        - 3rd Mechanised Infantry Battalion, King's Guard
      - 902nd Infantry Brigade, King Vajiralongkorn's Guard -(Thai: กรมทหารราบ 902 รักษาพระองค์ในพระบาทสมเด็จพระเจ้าอยู่หัว)
        - Headquarters and Service Company, 902nd Infantry Brigade, King Vajiralongkorn's Guard
        - 1st Mechanised Infantry Battalion, 902nd Infantry Brigade, King Vajiralongkorn's Guard
        - 2nd Infantry Battalion, 902nd Infantry Brigade, King Vajiralongkorn's Guard
        - 3rd Infantry Battalion, 902nd Infantry Brigade, King Vajiralongkorn's Guard
      - 2nd Artillery Brigade, King's Guard - (Thai: กรมทหารปืนใหญ่ที่ 2 รักษาพระองค์)
        - Headquarters and Service Battery, 2nd Artillery Brigade, King's Guard
        - 2nd Artillery Regiment, King's Guard
        - 12th Artillery Regiment, King's Guard
        - 21st Artillery Regiment, King's Guard
        - 102nd Artillery Regiment, King's Guard
      - 2nd Service Support Brigade, King's Guard
        - Logistic Battalion, 2nd Support Brigade- (Thai: กองพันทหารขนส่ง กรมสนับสนุนที่ 2)
        - Maintenance Battalion, 2nd Support Brigade- (Thai: กองพันซ่อมบำรุง กรมสนับสนุนที่ 2)
      - 2nd Armoured Regiment, King's Guard
      - 2nd Engineer Regiment, King's Guard
      - 2nd Medical Regiment, King's Guard
      - 2nd Signal Corps Regiment, King's Guard
      - 12th Military Police Regiment
      - 30th Cavalry Regiment, 2nd Infantry Division, King's Guard - (Thai: กองพันทหารม้าที่ 30 กองพลทหารราบที่ 2 รักษาพระองค์)
      - 2nd Anti-tank Company, King's Guard
      - 2nd Long Range Reconnaissance Company
      - Airfield Service and Control Tower Team 2
    - 9th Infantry Division - (Thai: กองพลทหารราบที่ 9) (Fort Surasi, Kanchanaburi province)
      - Headquarters and Service Company, 9th Infantry Division
      - 9th Infantry Brigade - (Thai: กรมทหารราบที่ 9)
        - Headquarters and Service Company, 9th Infantry Brigade
        - 1st Infantry Battalion
        - 2nd Infantry Battalion
        - 3rd Infantry Battalion
      - 19th Infantry Brigade - (Thai: กรมทหารราบที่ 19)
        - Headquarters and Service Company, 19th Infantry Brigade
        - 1st Infantry Battalion
        - 2nd Infantry Battalion
        - 3rd Infantry Battalion (Designated as First Army Area Rapid Deployment Force)
      - 29th Infantry Brigade - (Thai: กรมทหารราบที่ 29)
        - Headquarters and Service Company, 29th Infantry Brigade
        - 1st Infantry Battalion
        - 2nd Infantry Battalion
        - 3rd Infantry Battalion
      - 9th Artillery Brigade - (Thai: กรมทหารปืนใหญ่ที่ 9)
        - Headquarters and Service Battery, 9th Artillery Brigade
        - 9th Field Artillery Regiment
        - 19th Field Artillery Regiment
        - 109th Field Artillery Regiment
      - Service Support Brigade - (Thai: กรมสนับสนุน กองพลทหารราบที่ 9)
        - Headquarters and Service Company
        - Medical Regiment
        - Maintenance Regiment
        - Transportation Regiment
        - Detachment, Service Support Brigade, 9th Infantry Division
      - 9th Engineer Regiment
      - 9th Signal Regiment
      - 19th Cavalry Regiment
      - 9th Army Aviation Company
      - 9th Long Range Reconnaissance Company
      - 2nd Field Military Police Company, 12th Military Police Regiment
      - Fort Surasi Hospital
      - Light Ordnance Division
      - Quartermaster Division
    - 11th Infantry Division - (Thai: กองพลทหารราบที่ 11) (Fort Somdet Phra Nangklao, Chachoengsao province)
      - Headquarters and Service Company, 11th Infantry Division
      - 111th Infantry Brigade - (Thai: กรมทหารราบที่ 111)
        - Headquarters and Service Company, 111th Infantry Brigade
        - 1st Infantry Battalion
        - 2nd Infantry Battalion
        - 3rd Infantry Battalion
      - 112th Mechanised Infantry Brigade (Stryker Regiment Combat Team) - (Thai: กรมทหารราบที่ 112)
        - Headquarters and Service Company, 112th Infantry Brigade (Stryker Regiment Combat Team)
        - Heavy Mortar Company
        - Reconnaissance and Surveillance Company
        - 1st Mechanised Infantry Battalion (Stryker Battalion Combat Team)
        - 2nd Mechanised Infantry Battalion (Stryker Battalion Combat Team)
        - 3rd Mechanised Infantry Battalion (Stryker Battalion Combat Team)
      - Service Support Brigade, 11th Infantry Division - (Thai: กรมสนับสนุน กองพลทหารราบที่ 11)
        - Maintenance Regiment, Service Support Brigade, 11th Infantry Division - (Thai: กองพันซ่อมบำรุง กรมสนับสนุน กองพลทหารราบที่ 11)
    - 2nd Cavalry Division, King's Royal Guard - (Thai: กองพลทหารม้าที่ 2 รักษาพระองค์ ในพระบาทสมเด็จพระมงกุฎเกล้าเจ้าอยู่หัว) (Bangkok)
      - Headquarters and Service Squadron, 2nd Cavalry Division, King's Royal Guard
      - 1st Armoured Brigade, King Mongkutklao's Guard
        - Headquarters and Service Troop, 1st Cavalry Brigade, King's Royal Guard
        - 1st Armoured Regiment, 1st Cavalry Brigade, King's Royal Guard
        - 3rd Armoured Regiment, 1st Cavalry Brigade, King's Royal Guard
        - 17th Armoured Regiment, 1st Cavalry Brigade, King's Royal Guard
      - 4th Armoured Brigade, King's Royal Guard - (Thai: กรมทหารม้าที่ 4 รักษาพระองค์ ในสมเด็จพระศรีนครินทราบรมราชชนนี) (Fort Adisorn, Saraburi province)
        - Headquarters and Service Squadron, 4th Armoured Brigade, King's Royal Guard
        - 5th Armoured Regiment, 4th Armoured Brigade, King's Royal Guard
        - 11th Armoured Regiment, 4th Armoured Brigade, King's Royal Guard
        - 25th Armoured Regiment, 4th Armoured Brigade, King's Royal Guard
      - 5th Armoured Brigade, King's Royal Guard - (Thai: กรมทหารม้าที่ 5 รักษาพระองค์ ในพระบาทสมเด็จพระมงกุฎเกล้าเจ้าอยู่หัว)
        - Headquarters and Service Troop, 5th Armoured Brigade, King's Royal Guard
        - 20th Armoured Regiment, 5th Armoured Brigade, King's Royal Guard
        - 23rd Armoured Regiment, 5th Armoured Brigade, King's Royal Guard
        - 24th Armoured Regiment, 5th Armoured Brigade, King's Royal Guard
      - 27th Cavalry Regiment, King's Royal Guard (Fort Adisorn, Saraburi province)
      - 29th Cavalry Regiment, King's Royal Guard - (Thai: กองพันทหารม้าที่ 29 รักษาพระองค์ ในพระบาทสมเด็จพระมหาภูมิพลอดุลยเดชมหาราช บรมนาถบพิตร) (Phaya Thai district, Bangkok)
      - 12th Signal Regiment, King's Royal Guard, 2nd Cavalry Division, King's Royal Guard - (Thai: กองพันทหารสื่อสารที่ 12 รักษาพระองค์ กองพลทหารม้าที่ 2 รักษาพระองค์ ในพระบาทสมเด็จพระมงกุฎเกล้าเจ้าอยู่หัว)
      - 12th Service Support Brigade - (Thai: กรมสนับสนุนที่12)
        - Maintenance Regiment
          - 1st Forward Division Support Company - (Thai: กองร้อยสนับสนุนส่วนหน้าที่ 1)
          - 2nd Forward Division Support Company - (Thai: กองร้อยสนับสนุนส่วนหน้าที่ 1)
      - 12th Quartermaster Division, 2nd Cavalry Division, King's Royal Guard
      - Airfield Service and Control Tower Team 8, 2nd Cavalry Division, King's Royal Guard
  - Combat Service Support Division - (Thai: ส่วนสนับสนุนการช่วยรบ)
    - 1st Army Combat Service Support Command - (Thai: กองบัญชาการช่วยรบที่ 1)
      - 21st Logistics and Service Regiment, 1st Army Combat Service Support - (Thai: กองพันส่งกำลังและบริการที่ 21 กองบัญชาการช่วยรบที่ 1)
      - 21st Maintenance Regiment, 1st Army Combat Service Support - (Thai: กองพันซ่อมบำรุงที่ 21 กองบัญชาการช่วยรบที่ 1)
      - 21st Ordnance Ammunition Depot Regiment, 1st Army Combat Service Support - (Thai: กองพันสรรพาวุธกระสุนที่ 21 กองบัญชาการช่วยรบที่ 1)
      - Logistics Control Centre, 1st Army Combat Service Support - (Thai: ศูนย์ควบคุมการส่งกําลังบํารุง กองบัญชาการช่วยรบที่ 1)
      - Detachment, 1st Army Combat Service Support - (Thai: ส่วนแยก กองบัญชาการช่วยรบที่ 1)
  - Army Area Military Districts - (Thai: ส่วนภูมิภาค)
    - 11th Military District - (Thai: มณฑลทหารบกที่ 11)
      - 11th Military Police Regiment
      - Band Platoon, 11th Military Circle
      - Infantry Battalion, 11th Military Circle
      - Military Prison, 11th Military Circle
    - 12nd Military District - (Thai: มณฑลทหารบกที่ 12)
      - 12th Military Police Regiment
      - Army Reserve Training Center, 12nd Military Circle - (Thai: ศูนย์การฝึกนักศึกษาวิชาทหาร มณฑลทหารบกที่ 12)
      - Band Platoon, 12th Military Circle
      - Military Prison, 12th Military Circle
    - 13th Military District - (Thai: มณฑลทหารบกที่ 13)
      - 13th Military Police Regiment
      - Army Reserve Training Center, 13nd Military Circle - (Thai: ศูนย์การฝึกนักศึกษาวิชาทหาร มณฑลทหารบกที่ 13)
      - Band Platoon, 13th Military Circle
      - Military Prison, 13th Military Circle
    - 14th Military District - (Thai: มณฑลทหารบกที่ 14)
      - 14th Military Police Regiment
      - Army Reserve Training Center, 14th Military Circle - (Thai: ศูนย์การฝึกนักศึกษาวิชาทหาร มณฑลทหารบกที่ 14)
      - Band Platoon, 14th Military Circle
      - Military Prison, 14th Military Circle
    - 15th Military Circle - (Thai: มณฑลทหารบกที่ 15)
      - 15th Military Circle Regiment- (Thai: กองพันมณฑลทหารบกที่ 15)
      - 15th Military Police Regiment
      - Army Reserve Training Unit, 15th Military Circle - (Thai: หน่วยการฝึกนักศึกษาวิชาทหาร มณฑลทหารบกที่ 15)
      - Band Platoon, 15th Military Circle
      - Military Prison, 15th Military Circle
    - 16th Military District - (Thai: มณฑลทหารบกที่ 16)
      - 16th Military Police Regiment
      - Army Reserve Training Unit, 16th Military Circle - (Thai: หน่วยการฝึกนักศึกษาวิชาทหาร มณฑลทหารบกที่ 16)
      - Band Platoon, 16th Military Circle
      - Military Prison, 16th Military Circle
    - 17th Military District - (Thai: มณฑลทหารบกที่ 17)
      - 17th Military Police Regiment
      - Army Reserve Training Unit, 17th Military Circle - (Thai: หน่วยการฝึกนักศึกษาวิชาทหาร มณฑลทหารบกที่ 17)
      - Band Platoon, 17th Military Circle
      - Military Prison, 17th Military Circle
    - 18th Military District - (Thai: มณฑลทหารบกที่ 18)
      - 18th Military Police Regiment
      - Army Reserve Training Unit, 18th Military Circle - (Thai: หน่วยการฝึกนักศึกษาวิชาทหาร มณฑลทหารบกที่ 18)
      - Band Platoon, 18th Military Circle
      - Military Prison, 18th Military Circle
    - 19th Military District - (Thai: มณฑลทหารบกที่ 19)
      - 19th Military Police Regiment
      - Army Reserve Training Unit, 19th Military Circle - (Thai: หน่วยการฝึกนักศึกษาวิชาทหาร มณฑลทหารบกที่ 19)
      - Band Platoon, 19th Military Circle
      - Military Prison, 19th Military Circle
  - Development Country Division (Thai: ส่วนช่วยการพัฒนาประเทศ)
    - 1st Development Division - (Thai: กองพลพัฒนาที่ 1) (Fort Sri Suriyawonge, Ratchaburi province)
      - Headquarters and Service Company, 1st Development Division
      - 1st Development Brigade - (Thai: กรมพัฒนาที่ 1)
        - 1st Development Regiment - (Thai: กองพันพัฒนาที่ 1)
      - 1st Engineer Brigade, King's Guard - (Thai: กรมทหารช่างที่ 1 รักษาพระองค์)
        - 52nd Engineer Regiment, King's Royal Guard - (Thai: กองพันทหารช่างที่ 52 รักษาพระองค์)
        - 112th Engineer Regiment, King's Royal Guard - (Thai: กองพันทหารช่างที่ 112 รักษาพระองค์)
- 2nd Army Area (Thai: กองทัพภาคที่ 2) – headquartered in Nakhon Ratchasima and is responsible for the northeastern quadrant.
  - Headquarters and Headquarters Company, 2nd Army Area
  - Headquarters and Headquarters Company, 2nd Army Corps
  - 2nd Special Operations Training Company
  - 22nd Signal Corps Battalion, 2nd Army Area
  - 21st Ranger Forces Regiment
  - 22nd Ranger Forces Regiment
  - 23rd Ranger Forces Regiment
  - 26th Ranger Forces Regiment
  - 3rd Infantry Division - (Thai: กองพลทหารราบที่ 3) (Fort Suranari, Nakhon Ratchasima Province)
    - Headquarters and Headquarters Company, 3rd Infantry Division
    - 3rd Infantry Brigade - (Thai: กรมทหารราบที่ 3)
      - Headquarters and Service Company
      - 1st Infantry Battalion
      - 2nd Infantry Battalion
      - 3rd Infantry Battalion
    - 8th Infantry Brigade - (Thai: กรมทหารราบที่ 8)
      - Headquarters and Service Company
      - 1st Infantry Battalion
      - 2nd Infantry Battalion
      - 3rd Infantry Battalion
    - 13th Infantry Brigade - (Thai: กรมทหารราบที่ 13)
      - Headquarters and Service Company
      - 1st Infantry Battalion
      - 2nd Infantry Battalion
      - 3rd Infantry Battalion
    - 3rd Artillery Brigade - (Thai: กรมทหารปืนใหญ่ที่ 3)
      - Headquarters and Service Battery
      - 3rd Artillery Regiment
      - 8th Artillery Regiment
      - 13th Artillery Regiment
      - 103rd Artillery Regiment
    - 3rd Cavalry Squadron (Reconnaissance) - (Thai: กองร้อยทหารม้าลาดตระเวนที่ 3 กองพลทหารราบที่ 3)
    - 8th Armoured Regiment - (Thai: กองพันทหารม้าที่ 8 กองพลทหารราบที่ 3)
    - 3rd Engineer Regiment - (Thai: กองพันทหารช่างที่ 3 กองพลทหารราบที่ 3)
    - 3rd Medical Regiment - (Thai: กองพันเสนารักษ์ที่ 3 กองพลทหารราบที่ 3)
    - 3rd Signal Regiment - (Thai: กองพันทหารสื่อสารที่ 3 กองพลทหารราบที่ 3)
    - 3rd Long Range Reconnaissance Company - (Thai: กองร้อยลาดตระเวนระยะไกลที่ 3 กองพลทหารราบที่ 3)
    - Ordinance Company, 3rd Infantry Division - (Thai: กอง สพบ.พล.ร.๓)
    - 1st Field Military Police Company, 21st Military Police Regiment - (Thai: กองร้อยสารวัตรทหารสนามที่ 1 กองพันสารวัตรทหารที่ 21)
    - Airfield Service and Control Tower Team 3, 3rd Infantry Division - (Thai: ชสบ.๓)
  - 6th Infantry Division - (Thai: กองพลทหารราบที่ 6) (Fort King Phutthayodfa Chulalok Maharat, Roi Et Province)
    - Headquarters and Headquarters Company, 6th Infantry Division
    - 6th Infantry Brigade - (Thai: กรมทหารราบที่ 6)
      - Headquarters and Service Company
      - 1st Infantry Battalion (Designated as 2nd Army Area Rapid Deployment Force)
      - 2nd Infantry Battalion
      - 3rd Infantry Battalion
    - 16th Infantry Brigade - (Thai: กรมทหารราบที่ 16)
      - Headquarters and Service Company
      - 1st Infantry Battalion
      - 2nd Infantry Battalion
      - 3rd Infantry Battalion
    - 23rd Infantry Brigade - (Thai: กรมทหารราบที่ 23)
      - Headquarters and Service Company
      - 1st Infantry Battalion
      - 3rd Infantry Battalion
      - 4th Infantry Battalion
    - 6th Artillery Brigade - (Thai: กรมทหารปืนใหญ่ที่ 6)
      - Headquarters and Service Battery
      - 6th Artillery Regiment
      - 16th Artillery Regiment
      - 23rd Artillery Regiment
      - 106th Artillery Regiment
    - 6th Cavalry (Reconnaissance) Squadron - (Thai: กองร้อยทหารม้าลาดตระเวนที่ 6 กองพลทหารราบที่ 6)
    - 21st Armoured Regiment - (Thai: กองพันทหารม้าที่ 21 กองพลทหารราบที่ 6)
    - 6th Anti-tank Company - (Thai: กองร้อยต่อสู้รถถังที่ 6 กองพลทหารราบที่ 6)
    - 6th Engineer Regiment - (Thai: กองพันทหารช่างที่ 6 กองพลทหารราบที่ 6)
    - 6th Signal Regiment - (Thai: กองพันทหารสื่อสารที่ 6 กองพลทหารราบที่ 6)
    - 6th Medical Regiment - (Thai: กองพันเสนารักษ์ที่ 6 กองพลทหารราบที่ 6)
    - 6th Long Range Reconnaissance Company - (Thai: กองร้อยลาดตระเวนระยะไกลที่ 6 กองพลทหารราบที่ 6)
    - Ordnance Company, 6th Infantry Division
    - Quartermaster Company, 6th Infantry Division
    - 2nd Field Military Police Company, 21st Military Police Regiment - (Thai: กองร้อยสารวัตรทหารสนามที่ 2 กองพันสารวัตรทหารที่ 21)
    - Airfield Service and Control Tower Team 6, 6th Infantry Division
  - 3rd Cavalry Division - (Thai: กองพลทหารม้าที่ 3) (Fort Tinsulanonda, Khon Kaen Province)
    - Headquarters and Service Squadron, 3rd Cavalry Division
    - 6th Armoured Brigade - (Thai: กรมทหารม้าที่ 6)
      - Headquarters and Service Squadron
      - 6th Armoured Regiment, 6th Armoured Regiment - (Thai: กองพันทหารม้าที่ 6 กรมทหารม้าที่ 6 ในสมเด็จพระศรีพัชรินทราบรมราชินีนาถ)
    - 7th Armoured Brigade - (Thai: กรมทหารม้าที่ 7)
      - Headquarters and Service Squadron
      - 14th Armoured Regiment, 7th Armoured Brigade - (Thai: กองพันทหารม้าที่ 14 กรมทหารม้าที่ 7 ในสมเด็จพระศรีพัชรินทราบรมราชินีนาถ)
  - 2nd Army Support Command - (Thai: กองบัญชาการช่วยรบที่ 2)
    - Headquarters and Service Company, 2nd Army Support Command
    - Logistics Control Centre, 2nd Army Support Command - (Thai: ศคบ.บชร.๒)
    - 22nd Logistic and Service Regiment- (Thai: กองพันส่งกำลังและบริการที่ 22 กองบัญชาการช่วยรบที่ 2)
    - 22nd Supply and Service Regiment- (Thai: พัน.สบร.๒๒ บชร.๒)
    - 22nd Maintenance Regiment, 2nd Army Support Command - (Thai: พัน.ซบร.๒๒ บชร.๒)
    - 22nd Ordnance Ammunition Regiment, 2nd Army Support Command - (Thai: กองพันสรรพาวุธกระสุนที่ 22 กองบัญชาการช่วยรบที่ 2)
    - 22nd Transportation Regiment, 2nd Army Support Command - (Thai: กองพันขนส่งที่ 22 กองบัญชาการช่วยรบที่ 2)
    - 22nd Medical Regiment, 2nd Army Support Command - (Thai: กองพันเสนารักษ์ที่ 22 กองบัญชาการช่วยรบที่ 2)
  - 2nd Development Division - (Thai: กองพลพัฒนาที่ 2)
    - Headquarters and Service Company, 2nd Development Division
    - 2nd Development Brigade - (Thai: กรมพัฒนาที่ 2)
      - Headquarters and Headquarters Company
      - 2nd Development Regiment- (Thai: กองพันพัฒนาที่ 2)
    - 2nd Engineer Brigade - (Thai: กรมทหารช่างที่ 2)
      - Headquarters and Service Company
      - 201st Engineer Regiment - (Thai: กองพันทหารช่างที่ 201 กรมทหารช่างที่ 2)
      - 202nd Engineer Regiment - (Thai: กองพันทหารช่างที่ 202 กรมทหารช่างที่ 2)
      - Support Division, 2nd Engineer Regiment - (Thai: กอง สน.)
        - 1st Equipment Company, Support Division, 2nd Engineer Regiment - (Thai: ร้อย.คม.๑ กอง สน.)
  - Military Districts - (Thai: มณฑลทหารบก)
    - 21st Military District - (Thai: มณฑลทหารบกที่ 21)
      - Infantry Battalion, 21st Military District
      - 21st Military Police Regiment
      - Band Platoon, 21st Military District
      - Reserve Officer Training Centre, 21st Military District
      - Military Prison, 21st Military District
    - 22nd Military District - (Thai: มณฑลทหารบกที่ 22)
      - 22nd Military District Company
      - Military Police Company, 22nd Military District
      - Band Platoon, 22nd Military District
      - Reserve Officer Training Centre, 22nd Military District
      - Military Prison, 22nd Military District
    - 23rd Military District - (Thai: มณฑลทหารบกที่ 23)
      - 23rd Military District Battalion
      - Military Police Company, 23rd Military District
      - Band Platoon, 23rd Military District
      - Reserve Officer Training Centre, 23rd Military District
      - Military Prison, 23rd Military District
    - 24th Military District- (Thai: มณฑลทหารบกที่ 24)
      - 24th Military District Company
      - Military Police Company, 24th Military District
      - Band Platoon, 24th Military District
      - Reserve Officer Training Centre, 24th Military District
      - Military Prison, 24th Military District
    - 25th Military District - (Thai: มณฑลทหารบกที่ 25)
      - 25th Military District Company
      - Military Police Company, 25th Military District
      - Band Platoon, 25th Military District
      - Reserve Officer Training Centre, 25th Military District
    - 26th Military District - (Thai: มณฑลทหารบกที่ 26)
      - 26th Military District Company
      - Military Police Company, 26th Military District
      - Band Platoon, 26th Military District
      - Reserve Officer Training Centre, 26th Military District
    - 27th Military District - (Thai: มณฑลทหารบกที่ 27)
      - 27th Military District Company
      - Military Police Company, 27th Military District
      - Band Platoon, 27th Military District
      - Reserve Officer Training Centre, 27th Military District
    - 28th Military District- (Thai: มณฑลทหารบกที่ 28)
      - 28th Military District Company
      - Military Police Company, 28th Military District
      - Band Platoon, 28th Military District
      - Reserve Officer Training Centre, 28th Military District
    - 29th Military District - (Thai: มณฑลทหารบกที่ 29)
      - 29th Military District Company
      - Military Police Company, 29th Military District
      - Band Platoon, 29th Military District
      - Reserve Officer Training Centre, 29th Military District
    - 210th Military District - (Thai: มณฑลทหารบกที่ 210)
      - 210th Military District Company
      - Military Police Company, 210th Military District
      - Reserve Officer Training Centre, 210th Military District
- 3rd Army Area (Thai: กองทัพภาคที่ 3) – headquartered in Phitsanulok, responsible for the northern and northwestern parts of the kingdom.
    - Headquarters and Service Company, 3rd Army Area
    - Headquarters and Service Company, 3rd Army Corps
    - 3rd Special Operations Training Company
    - 23rd Signal Battalion, 3rd Army Area
    - 31st Ranger Forces Regiment
    - 32nd Ranger Forces Regiment
    - 33rd Ranger Forces Regiment
    - 35th Ranger Forces Regiment
    - 36th Ranger Forces Regiment
  - 4th Infantry Division - (Thai: กองพลทหารราบที่ 4) (Fort King Naresuan Maharat, Phitsanulok Province)
    - Headquarters and Headquarters Company, 4th Infantry Division
    - 4th Infantry Brigade - (Thai: กรมทหารราบที่ 4)
      - Headquarters and Headquarters Company
      - 1st Infantry Battalion
      - 2nd Infantry Battalion
      - 3rd Infantry Battalion
    - 7th Infantry Brigade - (Thai: กรมทหารราบที่ 7)
      - Headquarters and Headquarters Company
      - 1st Infantry Battalion
      - 2nd Infantry Battalion
      - 3rd Infantry Battalion
    - 14th Infantry Brigade - (Thai: กรมทหารราบที่ 14)
      - Headquarters and Headquarters Company
      - 1st Infantry Battalion
      - 2nd Infantry Battalion
      - 3rd Infantry Battalion
    - 4th Artillery Brigade - (Thai: กรมทหารปืนใหญ่ที่ 4)
      - Headquarters and Service Battery
      - 4th Artillery Regiment
      - 7th Artillery Regiment
      - 17th Artillery Regiment
      - 104th Artillery Regiment
    - 4th Cavalry (Reconnaissance) Squadron - (Thai: กองร้อยทหารม้าลาดตระเวน ที่ 4 กองพลทหารราบที่ 4)
    - 9th Armoured Regiment - (Thai: กองพันทหารม้าที่ 9 กองพลทหารราบที่ 4)
    - 4th Engineer Regiment - (Thai: กองพันทหารช่างที่ 4 กองพลทหารราบที่ 4)
    - 4th Medical Regiment - (Thai: กองพันเสนารักษ์ที่ 4 กองพลทหารราบที่ 4)
    - 4th Signal Regiment - (Thai: กองพันทหารสื่อสารที่ 4 กองพลทหารราบที่ 4)
    - 4th Long Range Reconnaissance Company - (Thai: กองร้อยลาดตระเวนระยะไกลที่ 4 กองพลทหารราบที่ 4)
    - Ordnance Company, 4th Infantry Division
    - Quartermaster Company, 4th Infantry Division
    - Airfield Service and Control Tower Team 4, 4th Infantry Division
  - 7th Infantry Division - (Thai: กองพลทหารราบที่ 7) (Fort Chao Khun Nen, Chiang Mai Province )
    - Headquarters and Service Company, 7th Infantry Division
    - 17th Infantry Brigade - (Thai: กรมทหารราบที่ 17)
      - Headquarters and Service Company
      - 2nd Infantry Battalion
      - 3rd Infantry Battalion
      - 4th Infantry Battalion
  - 1st Cavalry Division - (Thai: กองพลทหารม้าที่ 1) (Fort Phokhun Pha Mueang, Phetchabun Province)
    - 12th Cavalry Regiment, 1st Cavalry Division - (Thai: กองพันทหารม้าที่ 12 กองพลทหารม้าที่ 1)
    - 28th Cavalry Regiment, 1st Cavalry Division - (Thai: กองพันทหารม้าที่ 28 กองพลทหารม้าที่ 1)
    - 2nd Armoured Brigade - (Thai: กรมทหารม้าที่ 2)
      - Headquarters and Service Squadron
      - 7th Armoured Regiment, 2nd Armoured Brigade - (Thai: กองพันทหารม้าที่ 7 กรมทหารม้าที่ 2)
      - 10th Armoured Cavalry Regiment, 2nd Armoured Brigade - (Thai: กองพันทหารม้าที่ 10 กรมทหารม้าที่ 2)
      - 15th Armoured Cavalry Regiment, 2nd Armoured Brigade - (Thai: กองพันทหารม้าที่ 15 กรมทหารม้าที่ 2)
    - 3rd Armoured Brigade - (Thai: กรมทหารม้าที่ 3)
      - Headquarters and Service Squadron
      - 13th Armoured Regiment, 3rd Armoured Brigade - (Thai: กองพันทหารม้าที่ 13 กรมทหารม้าที่ 3)
      - 18th Armoured Regiment, 3rd Armoured Brigade - (Thai: กองพันทหารม้าที่ 18 กรมทหารม้าที่ 3)
      - 26th Armoured Regiment, 3rd Armoured Brigade - (Thai: กองพันทหารม้าที่ 26 กรมทหารม้าที่ 3)
    - 21st Artillery Brigade - (Thai: กรมทหารปืนใหญ่ที่ 21)
      - Headquarters and Service Battery
      - 20th Artillery Regiment
      - 30th Artillery Regiment
    - 8th Engineer Regiment - (Thai: กองพันทหารช่างที่ 8 กองพลทหารม้าที่ 1)
    - 11th Signal Regiment - (Thai: กองพันทหารสื่อสารที่ 11 กองพลทหารม้าที่ 1)
    - Long Range Reconnaissance Company, 1st Cavalry Division
    - Ordnance Company, 1st Cavalry Division
      - 1st Forward Maintenance Platoon, Ordnance Company
      - 2nd Forward Maintenance Platoon, Ordnance Company
    - Quartermaster Company, 1st Cavalry Division
    - 2nd Field Military Police Company, 31st Military Police Regiment
    - Airfield Service and Control Tower Team 7, 1st Cavalry Division
  - 3rd Army Support Command - (Thai: กองบัญชาการช่วยรบที่ 3)
    - Headquarters and Service Company, 3rd Army Support Command
    - Logistics Control Centre, 3rd Army Support Command
    - 23rd Supply and Service Regiment, 3rd Army Support Command - (Thai: กองพันส่งกำลังและบริการที่ 22 กองบัญชาการช่วยรบที่ 2)
    - 23rd Maintenance Regiment, 3rd Army Support Command - (Thai: กองพันซ่อมบำรุงที่ 23 กองบัญชาการช่วยรบที่ 3)
    - 23rd Ordnance Ammunition Regiment, 3rd Army Support Command - (Thai: กองพันสรรพาวุธกระสุนที่ 23 กองบัญชาการช่วยรบที่ 3)
    - 23rd Transportation Regiment, 3rd Army Support Command - (Thai: กองพันขนส่งที่ 22 กองบัญชาการช่วยรบที่ 2)
    - 23rd Medical Regiment, 3rd Army Support Command - (Thai: กองพันเสนารักษ์ที่ 23 กองบัญชาการช่วยรบที่ 3)
  - 3rd Development Division - (Thai: กองพลพัฒนาที่ 3)
    - Headquarters and Service Company of 3rd Development Division
    - 3rd Engineer Brigade - (Thai: กรมทหารช่างที่ 3)
      - 301st Engineer Regiment- (Thai: กองพันทหารช่างที่ 301 กรมทหารช่างที่ 3)
      - 302nd Engineer Regiment- (Thai: กองพันทหารช่างที่ 302 กรมทหารช่างที่ 3)
      - 3rd Development Regiment- (Thai: กองพันพัฒนาที่ 3)
      - Support Division, 3rd Engineer Brigade - (Thai: กอง สน.)
        - 1st Equipment Company, Support Division, 3rd Engineer Brigade
  - Military Districts - (Thai: มณฑลทหารบก)
    - 31st Military District - (Thai: มณฑลทหารบกที่ 31)
      - 31st Military District Company
      - Military Police Company, 31st Military District
      - Band Platoon, 31st Military District
      - Reserve Officer Training Centre, 31st Military District
      - Military Prison, 31st Military District
    - 32nd Military District - (Thai: มณฑลทหารบกที่ 32)
      - 32nd Military District Company
      - Military Police Company, 32nd Military District
      - Band Platoon, 32nd Military District
      - Reserve Officer Training Centre, 32nd Military District
      - Military Prison, 32nd Military District
    - 33rd Military District - (Thai: มณฑลทหารบกที่ 33)
      - 33rd Military District Battalion
      - Military Police Company, 33rd Military District
      - Band Platoon, 33rd Military District
      - Reserve Officer Training Centre, 33rd Military District
      - Military Prison, 33rd Military District
    - 34th Military District - (Thai: มณฑลทหารบกที่ 34)
      - 34th Military District Company
      - Military Police Company, 34th Military District
      - Band Platoon, 34th Military District
      - Reserve Officer Training Centre, 34th Military District
    - 35th Military District - (Thai: มณฑลทหารบกที่ 35)
      - 35th Military District Company
      - Military Police Company, 35th Military District
      - Band Platoon, 35th Military District
      - Reserve Officer Training Centre, 35th Military District
    - 36th Military District - (Thai: มณฑลทหารบกที่ 36)
      - 36th Military District Company
      - Military Police Company, 36th Military District
      - Band Platoon, 36th Military District
      - Reserve Officer Training Centre, 36th Military District
    - 37th Military District - (Thai: มณฑลทหารบกที่ 37)
      - 37th Military District Company
      - Military Police Company, 37th Military District
      - Band Platoon, 37th Military District
      - Reserve Officer Training Centre, 37th Military District
    - 38th Military District - (Thai: มณฑลทหารบกที่ 38)
      - 38th Military District Company
      - Military Police Company, 38th Military District
      - Band Platoon, 38th Military District
      - Reserve Officer Training Centre, 38th Military District
    - 39th Military District - (Thai: มณฑลทหารบกที่ 39)
      - 39th Military District Company
      - 31st Military Police Regiment
      - Band Platoon, 39th Military District
      - Reserve Officer Training Centre, 39th Military District
    - 310th Military District - (Thai: มณฑลทหารบกที่ 310)
      - 310th Military District Company
      - Military Police Company, 310th Military District
      - Band Platoon, 310th Military District
      - Reserve Officer Training Centre, 310th Military District
- Fouth Army Area - (Thai: กองทัพภาคที่ 4) – headquartered in Nakhon Si Thammarat, responsible for southern Thailand, it is the area that serves as the frontine command for those engaged in South Thailand insurgency. Leaked diplomatic cables from 2006 said: "Military forces totaling approximately 35,000 troops fall under the command of the 4th Army....the 5th Inf Div and the 15th Development Division (three regiments) totaling approximately 20,000 troops are the main units of the 4th Army."
  - Organic Units - (Thai: หน่วยขึ้นตรง)
    - 4th Army Corps
  - Command Division - (Thai: ส่วนบัญชาการ)
  - 24th Signal Regiment, 4th Army Area
  - Combat Division - (Thai: ส่วนการรบ)
    - Fouth Army Area Operations Center - (Thai: ศูนย์ปฏิบัติการกองทัพภาคที่ 4)
      - Thepsatri Command aka Thepsatri Task Force - (Thai: กองกำลังเทพสตรี)
        - Civil Affairs Branch
        - Finance Branch
        - Logistic Branch
        - Military Intelligence Unit
        - National Defense Volunteer - (Thai: ไทยอาสาป้องกันชาติ)
        - Operation Plans Branch
        - Personnel Branch
        - Quick Reaction Force Company
        - Signal Corps Team
        - 49th Ranger Forces Regiment - (Thai: กรมทหารพรานที่ 49)
      - Suriyothai Command aka Suriyothai Task Force - (Thai: กองบังคับการควบคุมสุริโยทัย)
    - 4th Special Forces Training Company - (Thai: กองร้อยฝึกรบพิเศษที่ 4)
    - 41st Ranger Forces Regiment - (Thai: กรมทหารพรานที่ 41)
    - 42nd Ranger Forces Regiment - (Thai: กรมทหารพรานที่ 42)
    - 43rd Ranger Forces Regiment - (Thai: กรมทหารพรานที่ 43)
    - 44th Ranger Forces Regiment - (Thai: กรมทหารพรานที่ 44)
    - 45th Ranger Forces Regiment - (Thai: กรมทหารพรานที่ 45)
    - 46th Ranger Forces Regiment - (Thai: กรมทหารพรานที่ 46)
    - 47th Ranger Forces Regiment - (Thai: กรมทหารพรานที่ 47)
    - 48th Ranger Forces Regiment - (Thai: กรมทหารพรานที่ 48)
    - 5th Infantry Division - (Thai: กองพลทหารราบที่ 5) – (Fort Thep Satri Srisunthorn, Nakhon Si Thammarat Province)
      - Headquarters and Service Company, 5th Infantry Division
      - 5th Infantry Brigade - (Thai: กรมทหารราบที่ 5)
        - Headquarters and Service Company, 5th Infantry Brigade
        - 1st Infantry Battalion
        - 2nd Infantry Battalion
        - 3rd Infantry Battalion
      - 15th Infantry Brigade - (Thai: กรมทหารราบที่ 15)
        - Headquarters and Service Company, 15th Infantry Brigade
        - 1st Infantry Battalion
        - 2nd Infantry Battalion (Designated as 4th Army Area Rapid Deployment Force)
        - 4th Infantry Battalion
      - 25th Infantry Brigade - (Thai: กรมทหารราบที่ 25)
        - Headquarters and Service Company, 25th Infantry Brigade
        - 1st Infantry Battalion
        - 2nd Infantry Battalion
        - 3rd Infantry Battalion
      - 5th Artillery Brigade - (Thai: กรมทหารปืนใหญ่ที่ 5)
        - Headquarters and Service Battery, 5th Artillery Brigade
        - 5th Artillery Regiment
        - 15th Artillery Regiment
        - 25th Artillery Regiment
        - 105th Artillery Regiment
      - 5th Engineer Regiment - (Thai: กองพันทหารช่างที่ 5 กองพลทหารราบที่ 5)
      - 16th Cavalry Regiment - (Thai: กองพันทหารม้าที่ 16 กองพลทหารราบที่ 5)
      - 5th Medical Regiment - (Thai: กองพันเสนารักษ์ที่ 5 กองพลทหารราบที่ 5)
      - 5th Signal Regiment - (Thai: กองพันทหารสื่อสารที่ 5 กองพลทหารราบที่ 5)
      - 5th Long Range Reconnaissance Company - (Thai: กองร้อยลาดตระเวนระยะไกลที่ 5 กองพลทหารราบที่ 5)
      - Light Ordnance Division
      - Quartermaster Division
      - Airfield Service and Control Tower Team 5
    - 15th Infantry Division - (Thai: กองพลทหารราบที่ 15) – (Fort Ingkhayutthaborihan, Pattani Province)
      - Headquarters and Service Company, 15th Infantry Division
      - 151st Infantry Brigade - (Thai: กรมทหารราบที่ 151)
        - Headquarters and Service Company, 151st Infantry Brigade
        - 1st Infantry Battalion
        - 2nd Infantry Battalion
        - 3rd Infantry Battalion
      - 152nd Infantry Brigade - (Thai: กรมทหารราบที่ 152)
        - Headquarters and Service Company, 152nd Infantry Brigade
        - 1st Infantry Battalion
        - 2nd Infantry Battalion
        - 3rd Infantry Battalion
      - 153rd Infantry Brigade - (Thai: กรมทหารราบที่ 153)
        - Headquarters and Service Company, 153nd Infantry Brigade
        - 1st Infantry Battalion
        - 2nd Infantry Battalion
        - 3rd Infantry Battalion
      - Service Support Brigade, 15th Infantry Division - (Thai: กรมสนับสนุน กองพลทหารราบที่ 15)
        - Headquarters and Service Company
        - Combat Medical Regiment
        - Logistic and Service Regiment
        - Maintenance Regiment
        - Psychological Operations Company
      - 15th Engineer Regiment - (Thai: กองพันทหารช่างที่ 15 กองพลทหารราบที่ 15)
      - 15th Military Intelligence Regiment - (Thai: กองพันข่าวกรองทหารที่ 15 กองพลทหารราบที่ 15)
      - 15th Signal Regiment - (Thai: กองพันทหารสื่อสารที่ 15 กองพลทหารราบที่ 15)
      - 31st Cavalry Regiment - (Thai: กองพันทหารม้าที่ 31 กองพลทหารราบที่ 15)
      - 15th Long Range Reconnaissance Company - (Thai: กองร้อยลาดตระเวนระยะไกลที่ 15 กองพลทหารราบที่ 15)
  - Combat Service Support Division - (Thai: ส่วนสนับสนุนการรบ)
    - 4th Army Combat Service Support Command - (Thai: กองบัญชาการช่วยรบที่ 4)
      - 24th Logistics and Service Regiment, 4th Army Combat Service Support - (Thai: กองพันส่งกำลังและบริการที่ 24 กองบัญชาการช่วยรบที่ 4)
      - 24th Maintenance Regiment, 4th Army Combat Service Support - (Thai: กองพันซ่อมบำรุงที่ 24 กองบัญชาการช่วยรบที่ 4)
      - 24th Medical Supplies Depot, 4th Army Combat Service Support
      - 24th Ordnance Ammunition Depot Regiment, 4th Army Combat Service Support - (Thai: กองพันสรรพาวุธกระสุนที่ 24 กองบัญชาการช่วยรบที่ 4)
      - Logistics Control Centre, 4th Army Combat Service Support - (Thai: ศูนย์ควบคุมการส่งกําลังบํารุง กองบัญชาการช่วยรบที่ 4)
      - Detachment, 4th Army Combat Service Support - (Thai: ส่วนแยก กองบัญชาการช่วยรบที่ 4)
  - Army Area Division - (Thai: ส่วนภูมิภาค)
    - 41st Military Circle - (Thai: มณฑลทหารบกที่ 41)
      - 41st Military Police Regiment
      - Army Reserve Training Center, 41st Military Circle - (Thai: ศูนย์การฝึกนักศึกษาวิชาทหาร มณฑลทหารบกที่ 41)
      - Band Platoon, 41st Military Circle
      - Military Prison, 41st Military Circle
    - 42nd Military Circle - (Thai: มณฑลทหารบกที่ 42)
      - 42nd Military Circle Regiment
      - 42nd Military Police Regiment
      - Army Reserve Training Center, 42nd Military Circle - (Thai: ศูนย์การฝึกนักศึกษาวิชาทหาร มณฑลทหารบกที่ 42)
      - Band Platoon, 42nd Military Circle
      - Military Prison, 42nd Military Circle
    - 43rd Military Circle - (Thai: มณฑลทหารบกที่ 43)
      - Army Reserve Training Unit, 43rd Military Circle - (Thai: หน่วยฝึกนักศึกษาวิชาทหาร มณฑลทหารบกที่ 43)
      - Band Platoon, 43rd Military Circle
      - Military Police Company, 43rd Military Circle
      - Military Prison, 43rd Military Circle
    - 44th Military Circle - (Thai: มณฑลทหารบกที่ 44)
      - Army Reserve Training Unit, 44th Military Circle - (Thai: หน่วยฝึกนักศึกษาวิชาทหาร มณฑลทหารบกที่ 44)
      - Band Platoon, 44th Military Circle
      - Military Police Company, 44th Military Circle
      - Military Prison, 44th Military Circle
    - 45th Military Circle - (Thai: มณฑลทหารบกที่ 45)
      - Army Reserve Training Unit, 45th Military Circle - (Thai: หน่วยฝึกนักศึกษาวิชาทหาร มณฑลทหารบกที่ 45)
      - Band Platoon, 45th Military Circle
      - Military Police Company, 45th Military Circle
      - Military Prison, 45th Military Circle
    - 46th Military Circle - (Thai: มณฑลทหารบกที่ 46)
      - Army Reserve Training Unit, 46th Military Circle - (Thai: หน่วยฝึกนักศึกษาวิชาทหาร มณฑลทหารบกที่ 46)
      - Band Platoon, 46th Military Circle
      - Military Police Company, 46th Military Circle
      - Military Prison, 46th Military Circle
  - Development Country Division
    - 4th Development Division - (Thai: กองพลพัฒนาที่ 4) – US State Department cables leaked by Wikileaks in 2006 said: "The Development Division is itself a traditionally 'static unit' that provides engineering, construction and other support to local communities in the South. It is not formally charged with security operations. Indeed, Development Division officers were very proud in stating that they have better relations with the locals than other security elements — and have not been attacked while engaged in construction or relief efforts."
      - Headquarters and Service Company, 4th Development Division
      - 4th Development Brigade - (Thai: กรมพัฒนาที่ 4)
        - 4th Development Regiment- (Thai: กองพันพัฒนาที่ 4)
      - 401 Engineer Regiment - (Thai: กองพันทหารช่างที่ 401 กองพลพัฒนาที่ 4)
      - 402 Engineer Regiment - (Thai: กองพันทหารช่างที่ 402 กองพลพัฒนาที่ 4)
- Royal Thai Army Special Warfare Command (Thai: หน่วยบัญชาการสงครามพิเศษ) also known as Royal Thai Army Special force – headquartered in Thale Chup Son, Mueang Lopburi, Lopburi
  - Psychological Operations Regiment
    - Headquarters and Service Company
    - 1st Psychological Operations Company
    - 2nd Psychological Operations Company
    - 3rd Psychological Operations Company
    - Army Psychological Operations Company - (Thai: ร้อย.ปจว.ทบ.)
    - Communication Media Production Company - (Thai: ร้อย.ผลิตสิ่งโฆษณา)
    - Psychological Operations Campaign Company - (Thai: ร้อย.รณรงค์ด้าน ปจว.)
  - Quartermaster Aerial Supply Company - (Thai: กองพลาธิการส่งกำลังทางอากาศ)
  - Special Warfare Centre
    - Headquarters and Service Company, Special Warfare Centre
    - Special Warfare Battalion, Special Warfare Centre
    - Special Warfare School, Special Warfare Centre - (Thai: โรงเรียนสงครามพิเศษ ศูนย์สงครามพิเศษ)
      - Airborne Training Center
      - Basic Training School
      - Psychological Operations Training Center
      - Ranger Training Center
      - Special Force Training Center
      - Special Warfare School Battalion, Special Warfare Centre - (Thai: กองพันนักเรียนสงครามพิเศษ ศูนย์สงครามพิเศษ)
  - Special Warfare Medical Center - (Thai: หน่วยตรวจโรค ศูนย์สงครามพิเศษ)
  - 35th Signal Corps Battalion, Special Warfare Command (Thai: กองพันทหารสื่อสารที่ 35 หน่วยบัญชาการสงครามพิเศษ)
  - 1st Special Forces Division - (Thai: กองพลรบพิเศษที่ 1)
    - 1st Special Forces Regiment (Airborne) - (Thai: กรมรบพิเศษที่ 1 (ส่งทางอากาศ))
      - Headquarters and Service Company, 1st Special Forces Regiment
      - 1st Special Forces Battalion, 1st Special Forces Regiment
      - 2nd Special Forces Battalion, 1st Special Forces Regiment
    - 2nd Special Forces Regiment (Airborne) - (Thai: กรมรบพิเศษที่ 2 (ส่งทางอากาศ))
      - Headquarters and Service Company, 2nd Special Forces Regiment
      - 1st Special Forces Battalion, 2nd Special Forces Regiment
      - 2nd Special Forces Battalion, 2nd Special Forces Regiment
    - 3rd Special Forces Regiment, King's Royal Guard - (Thai: กรมรบพิเศษที่ 3 รักษาพระองค์ (ส่งทางอากาศ))
      - Ranger Battalion, 3rd Special Forces Regiment, King's Guard also known as Royal Thai Army Ranger - (Thai: กองพันจู่โจม กรมรบพิเศษที่ 3 รักษาพระองค์)
        - Ranger Battalion Headquarters
        - 1st Ranger Company
        - 2nd Ranger Company
        - 3rd Ranger Company
      - Special Operations Battalion, 3rd Special Forces Regiment, King's Guard also known as Task Force 90 - (Thai: กองพันปฏิบัติการพิเศษ กรมรบพิเศษที่ 3 รักษาพระองค์)
    - 4th Special Forces Regiment (Airborne) - (Thai: กรมรบพิเศษที่ 4 (ส่งทางอากาศ))
      - Headquarters and Service Company, 4th Special Forces Regiment
      - 1st Special Forces Battalion, 4th Special Forces Regiment
      - 2nd Special Forces Battalion, 4th Special Forces Regiment
    - 5th Special Forces Regiment (Airborne) - (Thai: กรมรบพิเศษที่ 5 (ส่งทางอากาศ))
      - Headquarters and Service Company, 5th Special Forces Regiment
      - 1st Special Forces Battalion, 5th Special Forces Regiment
      - 2nd Special Forces Battalion, 5th Special Forces Regiment
- Artillery Division - (Thai: กองพลทหารปืนใหญ่) – Headquartered in Fort Sirikit, Mueang Lopburi, Lopburi
  - Headquarters and Headquarters Battery, Artillery Division
  - Target Acquisition Battery
  - 71st Artillery Brigade
    - Headquarters and Headquarters Battery
    - 711th Artillery Regiment
    - 712th Artillery Regiment
    - 713th Artillery Regiment
  - 72nd Artillery Brigade
    - Headquarters and Headquarters Battery
    - 721st Artillery Regiment
    - 722nd Artillery Regiment
    - 723rd Artillery Regiment
- Army Air Defence Command - (Thai: หน่วยบัญชาการป้องกันภัยทางอากาศกองทัพบก) - Headquartered in Si Kan, Don Mueang, Bangkok
  - Headquarters and Headquarters Battery, Army Air Defence Command
  - Air Defence Division - (Thai: กองพลทหารปืนใหญ่ต่อสู้อากาศยาน) - (Dusit District, Bangkok)
    - Headquarters and Service Battery, Air Defence Division
    - 13th Signal Battalion, Air Defence Division
    - Ordnance Company, Air Defence Division
    - Quartermaster Company Air Defence Division
    - 13th Medical Battalion
    - 1st Air Defence Regiment
      - Headquarters and Service Battery
      - 3rd Air Defence Battalion
      - 5th Air Defence Battalion
      - 6th Air Defence Battalion
      - 7th Air Defence Battalion
    - 2nd Air Defence Regiment
      - Headquarters and Service Battery
      - 1st Air Defence Battalion
      - 2nd Air Defence Battalion
      - 4th Air Defence Battalion
  - Army Air Defence Operations Centre
    - 1st Army Air Defence Operations Centre
    - 2nd Army Air Defence Operations Centre
    - 3rd Army Air Defence Operations Centre
    - 4th Army Air Defence Operations Centre
- Combat Engineer Division - (Thai: กองพลทหารช่าง) - Headquartered in Fort Purachatra, Ko Phlappla, Mueang Ratchaburi, Ratchaburi
  - Headquarters and Service Company, Engineer Division
    - 11th Engineer Brigade
      - Headquarters and Service Company
      - 111th Combat Engineer Regiment
      - 602nd Combat Engineer Regiment
      - Special Equipment Combat Engineer Battalion
    - 51st Combat Engineer Regiment
- 1st Signal Brigade - (Thai: กรมทหารสื่อสารที่ 1) - Headquartered in Fort Kamphaeng Phet Akkharayothin, Krathum Baen District, Samut Sakhon
  - Headquarters and Service Company
  - 101st Signal Battalion
  - 102nd Signal Battalion
- Royal Thai Army Aviation Centre - (Thai: ศูนย์การบินทหารบก) - Headquartered in Fort Somdej Phra Srinagarindra, Khao Phra Ngam, Mueang Lop Buri District, Lopburi provides aerial transportation to the Royal Thai Army
  - Aviation Regiment, Army Aviation Centre - (Thai: กรมบิน ศูนย์การบินทหารบก)
    - Headquarters and Headquarters Company, Aviation Regiment
    - 1st Aviation Battalion "Hummingbird"
    - 2nd Aviation Battalion "Freebird"
    - 3rd Aviation Battalion "Raptor"
    - 9th Aviation Battalion "Blackhawk"
    - 21st Aviation Battalion "Blackbird"
    - 41st Aviation Battalion "Goliath"
  - Airbase Defence Regiment - (Thai: พัน.ปฐบ.)

The creation of the 15th Infantry Division was announced in January 2005. Defence Minister, General Samphan Boonyanan, was quoted as saying that the new unit, dubbed the "Development Division," would not be a combat unit for fighting Islamic militants, but rather its main mission would be to assist local citizens and develop the region. The military will not ignore its general function of providing safety for the citizens of the region, he added. He said that troops for the new division would undergo training to give them a good understanding of local residents, the vast majority of whom are ethnic Malay Muslims. The division is, in fact, a transformation of the Pranburi-based 16th Infantry Division. It will now be headquartered at Fort Ingkhayutthaborihan in Pattani, complete with its battalions and companies of military police and communications and aviation personnel, he said. It will also have three separate infantry battalions, one each in Pattani, Yala, and Narathiwat. Each battalion will include three companies of medical, engineering, and psychological warfare personnel, he said. The government will allocate a budget of more than 18 billion baht for the division over the next four years.

The 15th Infantry Division is being established as a permanent force to handle security problems in the Deep South. The division is based in Pattani and is expected to have a combined force of around 10,000. The establishment of this new division, approved by the government in 2005, has yet to be completed. As of this writing, some 7,000 troops deployed in the Deep South are affiliated with this division." In 2012, two new combat formations had been approved by the Thai government. The new 7th Infantry Division is based at Mae Rim, near Chiang Mai, and the new 3rd Cavalry Division is based at Khon Kaen.

=== Formations ===
Army formations are structured into 17 corps, split into 3 categories as shown below.

Component	Corps	Insignia and color	Mission
Combat Component	Infantry Corps		Its duty is to conduct combat operations using the firepower of its personal weapons to seize territory and destroy the enemy. It has the capability to move independently without relying heavily on vehicles and is considered the branch with the largest number of soldiers. It is known by the title "Queen of the Battlefield." The insignia features crossed rifles with a cartridge belt. Its corps colour is White.
Combat Component	Cavalry Corps		It conducts combat operations primarily using tanks and fast-moving vehicles, employing firepower to destroy and intimidate the enemy. It is an important combat branch and serves as one of the Army's main fighting forces, alongside the infantry. The insignia features crossed sabers with a horseshoe and a tank. Its corps colour is Dull Blue.
Combat Support Component	Artillery Corps		It conducts combat using artillery firepower to destroy enemy strongpoints and to support infantry assaults. It also provides direct fire support and shields the infantry during attacks to enable their operations. It is nicknamed the "King of the Battlefield." The insignia features crossed cannons with a flaming grenade. Its corps colour is Yellow.
Combat Support Component	Engineer Corps		Its duties include constructing, modifying, and repairing roads and bridges. In addition, combat engineers can fight alongside infantry units during assaults on enemy fortifications or heavily reinforced positions. The insignia features a crossed shovel and axe with an anchor. Its corps colour is Black.
Combat Support Component	Signal Corps		Its duty is to provide communications within and between units to support commanders and staff operations. It is also responsible for the procurement, distribution, and maintenance of communications equipment. The insignia features a lightning bolt with a cogwheel. Its corps colour is Violet or directly translated from Thai as "Mango Purple Seed".
Combat Support Component	Intelligence Corps		Its duties include planning, directing, coordinating, supervising, and conducting intelligence and security operations, as well as preparing military intelligence personnel for assignments. The insignia features a crossed lightning bolt and arrow with an eight-pointed star on a shield. It appears to have no corps colours.
Combat Auxiliary Component	Ordnance Corps		Its duties include researching and developing weapons and military equipment, as well as inspecting, storing, maintaining, advising on, and repairing various weapons to ensure they remain operational at all times. The insignia features a flaming grenade. Its corps colour is Orange and Green.
Combat Auxiliary Component	Quartermaster Corps		Its duties are to sustain and support military units by ensuring they are adequately provided with essential supplies and consumables. It is also responsible for replenishment, logistics support, storage, and distribution of unit supplies. The insignia features crossed sabers with three cogwheels. It appears to have no corps colours.
Combat Auxiliary Component	Medical Corps		Its duties are to provide medical care and conduct medical operations during both peacetime and wartime. In wartime, it operates alongside infantry units on the front lines by providing first aid and evacuating the wounded from the battlefield to field hospitals. The insignia features a pair of intertwined nagas serpents around a flaming torch. It appears to have no corps colours.
Combat Auxiliary Component	Transport Corps		Its duties are to transport personnel and supplies for various Army units and other assigned organizations by land, water (inland waterways), and air. It is also responsible for overseeing all transportation operations within the Army. The insignia features a ship's wheel combined with a cogwheel and wings on a shield. It appears to have no corps colours.
Combat Service Support Component	Adjutant General Corps		Has duties in administrative operations, including the receipt, dispatch, and sorting of official documents; the appointment, promotion, demotion, dismissal, and transfer of personnel; matters relating to pensions, gratuities, and disciplinary actions; maintaining records of correspondence, military service affairs, and other related duties. The insignia features a sword and a quill crossed together, with a book placed at the center of the emblem. It appears to have no corps colours.
Combat Service Support Component	Finance Corps		Has duties in disbursing salaries, allowances, and various expenses, as well as supervising the expenditures of the military unit to ensure compliance with military rules and regulations. The insignia features crossed swords combined with Erawan, a three-headed elephant. It appears to have no corps colours.
Combat Service Support Component	Judge Advocate General Corps		Has duties in enforcing military laws and regulations, as well as carrying out all judicial processes involving individuals, soldiers, or military units. The insignia features the scales of justice combined with a chakra wheel. It appears to have no corps colours.
Combat Service Support Component	Survey Corps		Has duties in preparing maps of various local areas for military units to use in movement and strategic operations, as well as surveying routes and updating map details to accurately reflect the actual terrain at all times. The insignia features crossed swords combined with a surveying telescope. It appears to have no corps colours.
Combat Service Support Component	Veterinarian Corps		Has duties in supporting military operations through the use of animals and agricultural activities of the Army, including planning, directing, and coordinating matters related to the affairs and equipment of the Army's Animal Service Corps. The insignia features crossed naga (serpents) combined with a horseshoe. It appears to have no corps colours.
Combat Service Support Component	Band Corps		Has duties in providing entertainment to relieve stress among soldiers and military units, boosting morale and inspiring soldiers through music so that they remain motivated, proud of their warrior's honor, and steadfast in performing their duties. The insignia features a harp (lyre). It appears to have no corps colours.
Combat Service Support Component	Military Police Corps		Has duties related to maintaining discipline, arresting soldiers who commit offenses, overseeing military prisons and traffic within military operations, ensuring security, conducting criminal investigations under military court jurisdiction, preventing and researching crimes within the Army, and managing matters concerning missing soldiers and prisoners of war. The insignia features crossed pistols combined with a chakra wheel. It appears to have no corps colours.

=== Tactical units ===
The army is organised into the following formations:

- 7 Standard Infantry Divisions
- 1 Mechanised Infantry Division
- 2 Light Infantry Divisions
- 3 Cavalry Divisions
- 1 Royal Thai Army Special Warfare Command (RTASWC) trained and equipped for small unit special warfare forces
- 1 independent Artillery Division
- 1 Air Defence Division
- 4 Combat engineer Regiment
- 1 independent Signals Regiment
- 1 Aviation Regiment

=== Army Medical Department ===
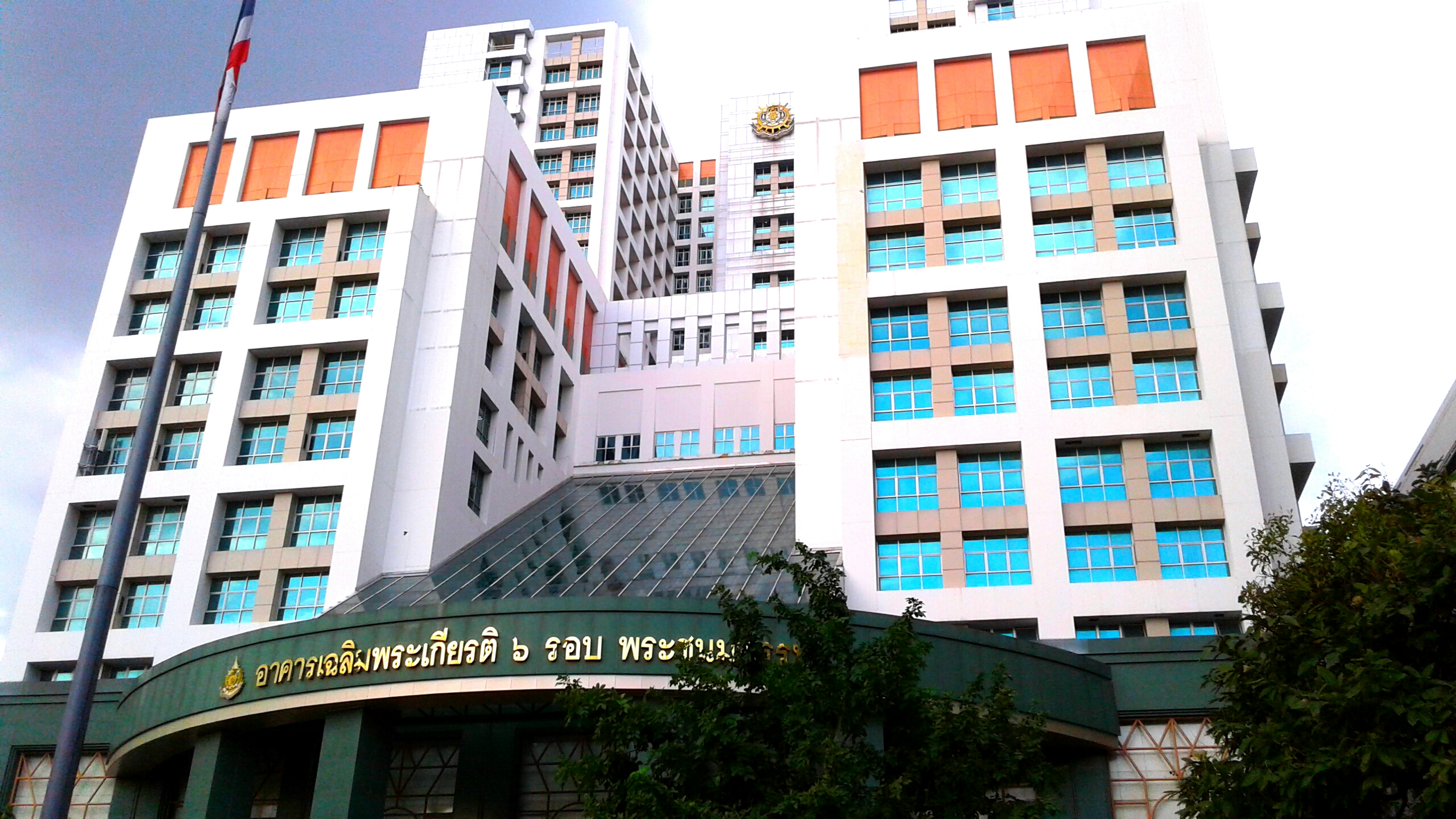
Phramongkutklao Hospital

Army Medical Department (AMED) (กรมแพทย์ทหารบก) belongs to the service segment of the Royal Thai Army. It is in charge of medical affairs, and providing medical care, both in the field and on base, training personnel in research and agriculture and supervising the other medical divisions within the Royal Thai Army.

AMED observed 111 years of service in January 2011, with 110 years of service having been honoured by issue of a series of commemorative stamps. AMED operates Phramongkutklao Hospital in Bangkok and Ananda Mahidol Hospital in Lopburi, along with smaller hospitals at each base, as well as the Phramongkutklao College of Medicine (PCM).

=== Air Division ===
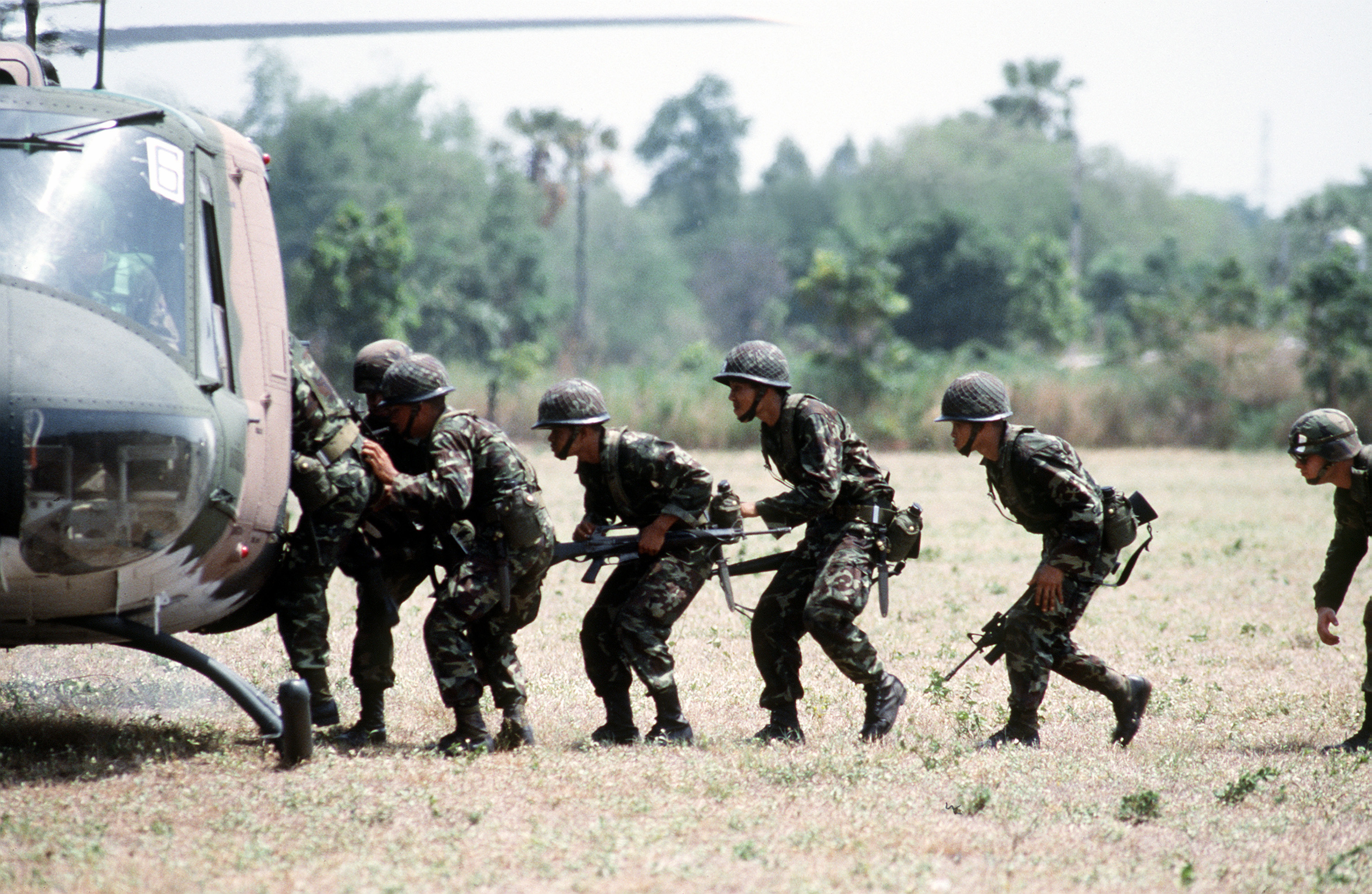
Thai army infantrymen board an RTA UH-1 Iroquois helicopter, 1992

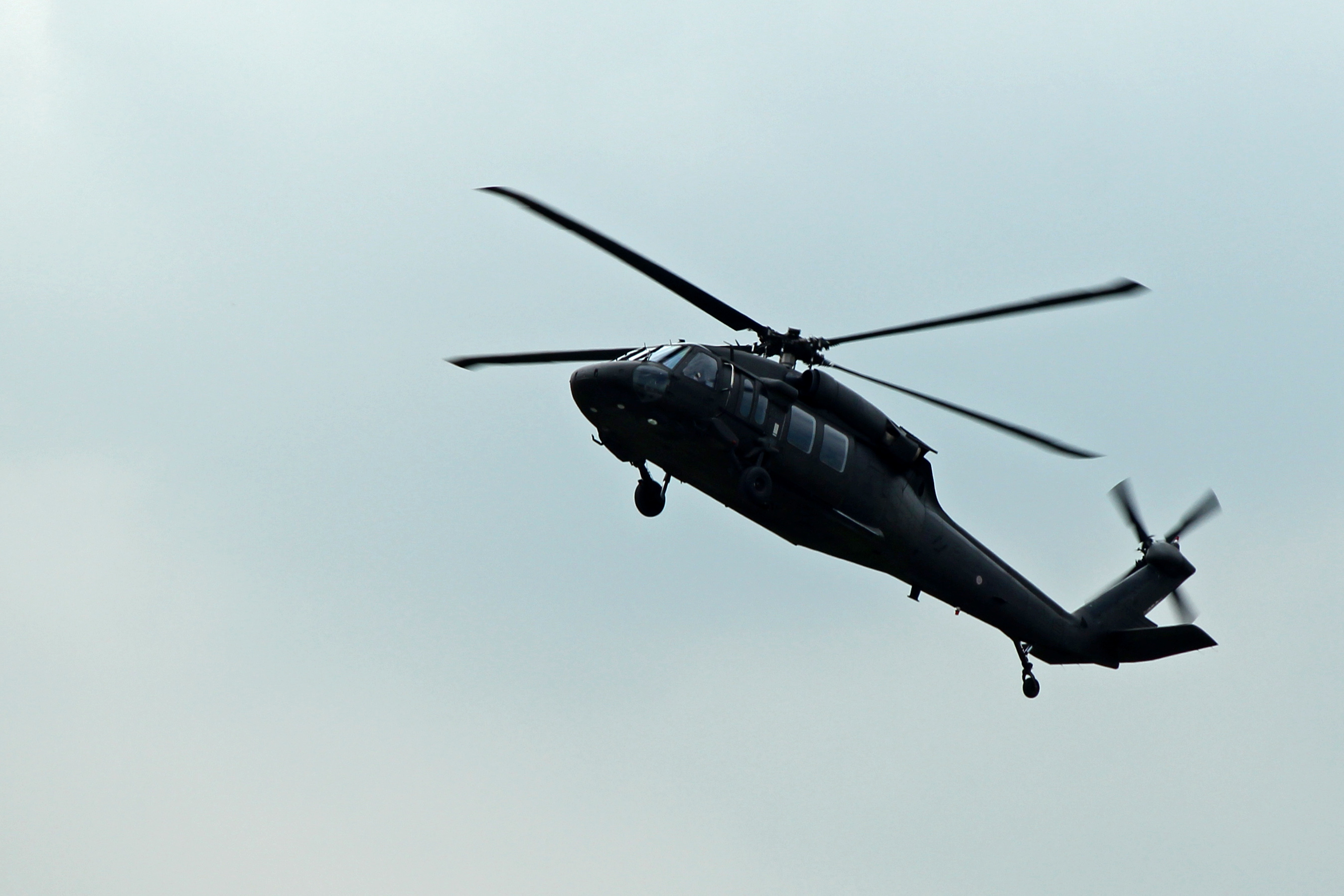
UH-60L Black Hawk during air show at Don Mueang Air Force Base

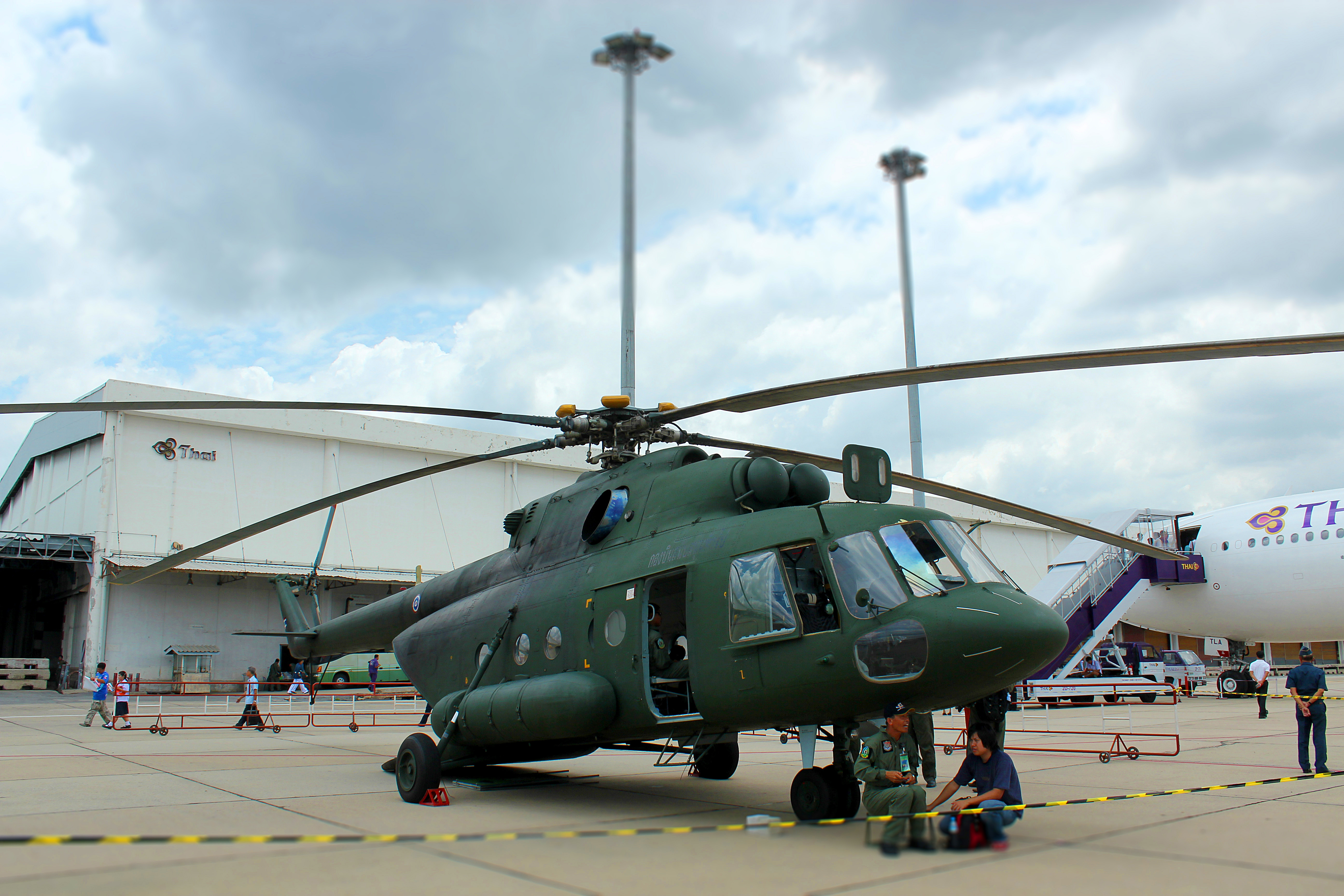
Mil Mi-17 V5 during air show at Don Mueang Air Force Base

Royal Thai Army Aviation Center (ศูนย์การบินทหารบก) belongs to the service segment of the Royal Thai Army Areas:

- Don Mueang International Airport (VTBD)
  - Units include the VIP squadron, flying two Embraer ERJ-135LRs (serial number 1084/HS-AMP and serial number 1124), two Jetstream 41s (serial numbers 41060 and 41094), two Casa 212–300s (serial numbers 446 and 447), and two Beech 1900C-1s (serial numbers 0169 and 0170) and the 1st Infantry Battalion operating two Bell 206Bs (serial numbers 4422 and 4448), three Schweizer S-300Cs (serial numbers 1340, 1366 and 1367), and two Cessna U-17B FAC aircraft (serial numbers 1616 and 1617).
- Bang Khen (3 km south of Don Mueang)
  - The Royal Squadron flies three Bell 212s and two Bell 412s (serial numbers 36332 and 36333). There is also a special transport unit flying around 10–12 Bell 212s and one or two Bell 206s.

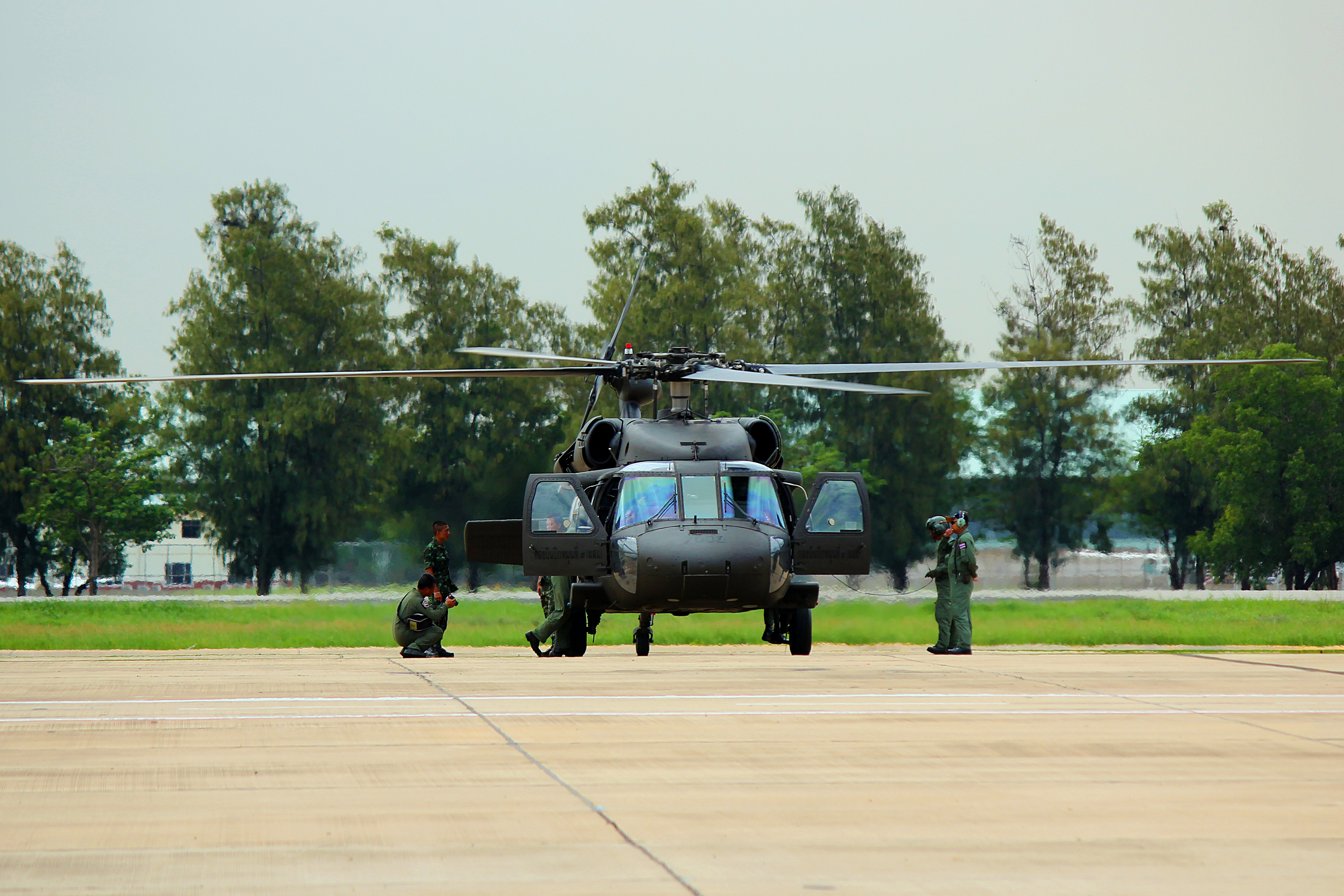
UH-60L Black Hawk during air show at Don Mueang Air Force Base

- Fort Surasi (Kanchanaburi)
  - The 9th Infantry Division operates two Bell 206Bs (the serial number of one is 4424), and two or three Schweizer S-300Cs. There is also a detachment of UH-1Hs from an Air Mobility Company based here.
- Fort Chakraphong (Prachinburi)
  - The "2nd Infantry Division, Queen Sirikit's Guard", was operating two Bell 206Bs (serial numbers 4446 and 4361), three Schweizer S-300Cs (serial numbers 1343, 1344, and 1345), and two Maule MX-7s (one serial number known is 099) in 2004, however it is likely the Maule MX-7s may now not be operated by this unit now. A detachment of this unit (with, in 1998, one Bell 206 and one Maule MX-7) was operating from Watthana Nakhon (VTBW) near the Cambodian border.

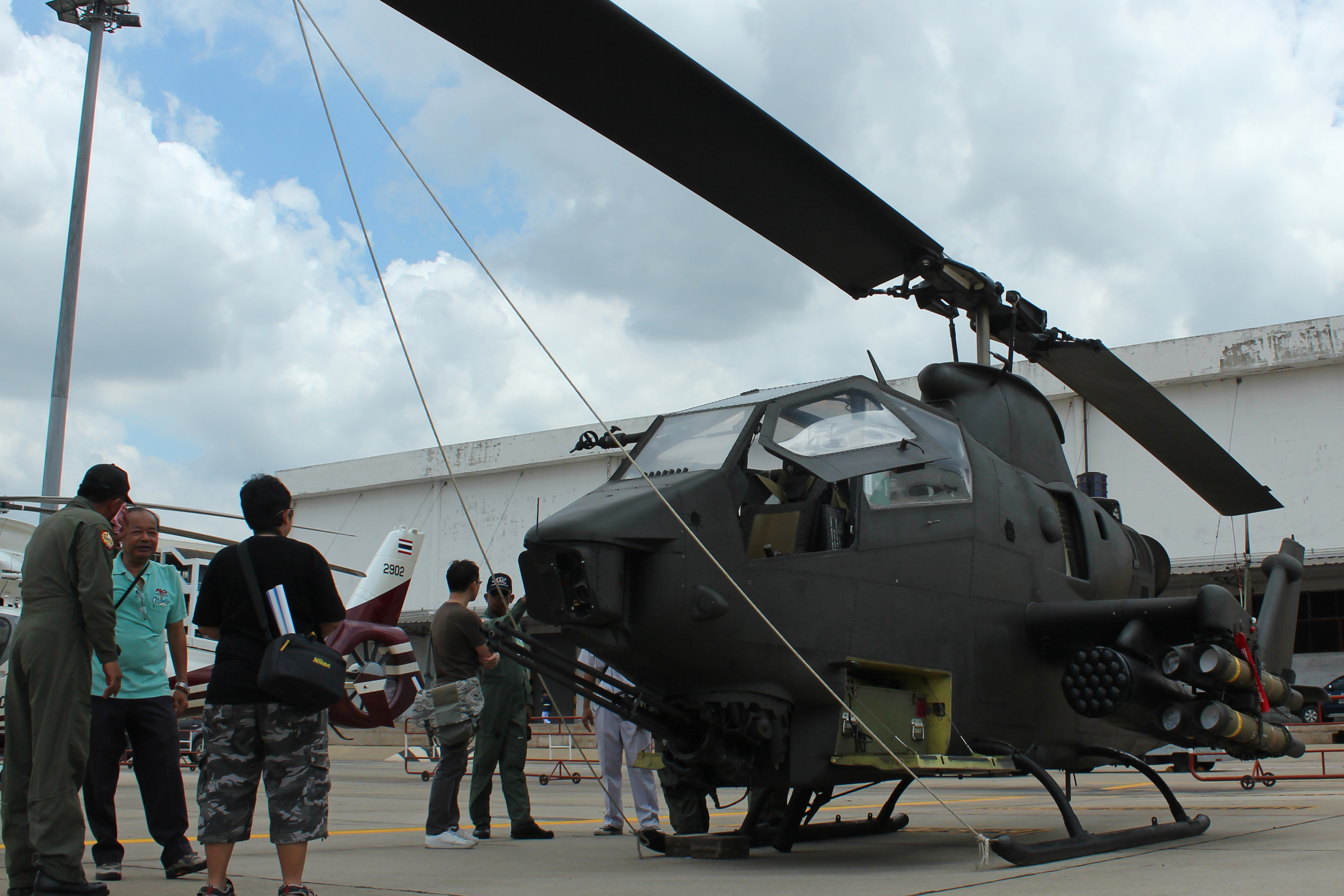
AH-1F Cobra attack helicopter during air show at Don Mueang Air Force Base

- Phitsanulok Airport (VTPP)
  - Loc 16 degrees 46'58.58N,100 degrees 16'44.84E elevation 154 feet/47 metres.
  - Runway 14/32 length 9,843 x 148 feet (3,000 x 45 metres)
  - Operating from here is the 4th Infantry Battalion with Bell 206Bs, Schweizer S-300Cs, Cessna U-17Bs, and Maule MX-7s.
- Fort Suranari (Khorat)
  - The main flying unit here is the 3rd Infantry Battalion flying two Bell 206Bs (serial numbers 4396 and 4447), two Schweizer S-300Cs (serial numbers 1337 and 1339), and two Cessna U-17Bs (serial numbers 1454 and 1618).
  - This field also hosts a detachment of up to three Bell 212 helicopters from one of the Air Mobility Companies.
- Fort Princess Srinagarindra (Lopburi), the main base complex of Royal Thai Army Aviation, including training, technical school, aircraft maintenance, and aircraft storage. The main airfield here is called Sa Pran Nak (VTBH).
  - Loc 14 degrees 56'58.02N, 100 degrees 38'34.88E elevation 95 feet (29 metres).
  - Runways 01/19 3,300 x 98 feet (1,006 x 30 metres) and 06/24 3,890 x 98 feet (1,186 x 30 metres)
  - Operating units here include:
    - Gong Bin Bau ( Light Aviation Company ) – operating Cessna U-17Bs, Cessna T-41s, and Searcher MKIIs
    - Gong Bin Pee-ak Moon Tee Nung ( 1st Air Mobility Company ) – operating Bell UH-1Hs and Bell 212s
    - Gong Bin Pee-ak Moon Tee Song ( 2nd Air Mobility Company ) – operating Bell UH-1Hs (US Excess Defense Articles Program) and Bell 212s
    - Gong Bin Pee-ak Moon Tee Sam ( 3rd Air mobility Company ) – operating Bell UH-1Hs, Bell 206Bs, Bell AH-1F Huey Cobras (eight) and Bell 212s
    - Gong Bin Pee-ak Moon Tee Gou (pasom) ( 9th Air Mobility Company ) [Mixed]) – operating Bell UH-1Hs (US Excess Defense Articles Program) and Sikorsky S-70-43 Black Hawks (six) with six more on order.
    - Gong Bin Sanub-sanoon Tua Pai (General Support Aviation Battalion) – operating Boeing CH-47D Chinooks, Bell UH-1Hs, and Mil Mi-17V5s
    - The army aviation centre is based here, which conducts conversion training for the army. Types operated are Cessna T-41Bs (ex-US army surplus), Maule MX-7s, and Schweizer S-300C piston trainer helicopters.
    - The two former VIP Beechcraft 200 King Air aeroplanes (serial numbers 0342 and 1165), are also based here. Their present role is unknown. These aeroplanes were modified in the US in the late 1990s.
  - A separate airfield within the Lopburi complex (around 3 km south of Sa Pran Nak) houses the 5th Aircraft Maintenance Company. This unit is responsible for maintenance and storage of army aircraft and helicopters.
  - The 5th Infantry Division operates the following aviation assets from a small airfield within the army reserve at Nakhon Si Thammarat (not at the airport): two Bell 206B-3s (serial numbers 4382 and 4427), three Schweizer TH-300Cs (serial numbers 1371, 1372, and 1373) and two Maule MX-7s (serial numbers 114 and 115). A detachment of helicopters can be found here from the Air Mobility Companies based at Lopburi.

=== Military districts ===
The army is divided into districts, whereby the first digit of the district indicates the army (first, second, third or fourth) responsible for its supervision. The names of forts are from locations or influential figures in Thailand's history. These are as follows:

Military district number	Provinces under control	Headquarters location
11	Bangkok, Nakhon Pathom, Nonthaburi, Pathum Thani, Samut Prakan	Laksi, Bangkok
12	Prachinburi, Nakhon Nayok, Chachoengsao	Fort Chakraphong, Prachinburi
13	Lopburi, Chai Nat, Sing Buri, Ang Thong	Fort King Narai Maharat, Lopburi
14	Chonburi, Rayong	Fort Nawaminthrachini, Chonburi
15	Phetchaburi, Prachuap Khiri Khan	Fort Ramratchaniwet, Phetchaburi
16	Ratchaburi, Samut Songkhram, Samut Sakhon	Fort Phanurangsi, Ratchaburi
17	Kanchanaburi, Suphan Buri	Fort Surasi, Kanchanaburi
18	Saraburi, Phra Nakhon Si Ayutthaya	Fort Adisorn, Saraburi
19	Sa Kaeo, Chanthaburi, Trat	Fort Surasinghanat, Sa Kaeo
21	Nakhon Ratchasima, Chaiyaphum	Fort Suranari, Nakhon Ratchasima
22	Ubon Ratchathani, Amnat Charoen	Fort Sapphasitthiprasong, Ubon Ratchathani
23	Khon Kaen, Kalasin	Fort Sripatcharin, Khon Kaen
24	Udon Thani, Nong Khai	Fort Prachaksinlapakhom, Udon Thani
25	Surin, Sisaket	Fort Weerawatyothin, Surin
26	Buriram, Maha Sarakham	Fort Somdej Chao Phraya Kasatsuek, Buriram
27	Roi Et, Yasothon	Fort Prasertsongkhram, Roi Et
28	Loei, Nong Bua Lamphu	Fort Srisongrak, Loei
29	Sakon Nakhon, Bueng Kan	Fort Kritsiwara, Sakon Nakhon
210	Nakhon Phanom, Mukdahan	Fort Phra Yod Mueang Khwang, Nakhon Phanom
31	Nakhon Sawan, Kamphaeng Phet, Uthai Thani	Fort Chiraprawat, Nakhon Sawan
32	Lampang	Fort Surasak Montri, Lampang
33	Chiang Mai, Mae Hong Son, Lamphun	Fort Kawila, Chiang Mai
34	Phayao	Fort Khun Chueang Thammikkarat, Phayao
35	Uttaradit, Phrae	Fort Phichai Dabhak, Uttaradit
36	Phetchabun, Phichit	Fort Phokhun Pha Mueang, Phetchabun
37	Chiang Rai	Fort King Mengrai Maharat, Chiang Rai
38	Nan	Fort Suriyaphong, Nan
39	Phitsanulok, Sukhothai	Fort King Naresuan Maharat, Phitsanulok
310	Tak	Fort Wachiraprakan, Tak
41	Nakhon Si Thammarat (except Thung Song District), Phuket	Fort Vajiravudh, Nakhon Si Thammarat
42	Songkhla, Phatthalung, Satun	Fort Senanarong, Songkhla
43	Nakhon Si Thammarat (only Thung Song District), Krabi, Trang	Fort Thep Satri Srisunthorn, Nakhon Si Thammarat
44	Chumphon, Ranong	Fort Khet Udomsak, Chumphon
45	Surat Thani, Phang Nga	Fort Vibhavadi Rangsit, Surat Thani
46	Pattani, Narathiwat, Yala	Fort Ingkhayutthaborihan, Pattani

== Budget ==
The RTA budget for Monument was 107,662 million baht, down from 112,815M baht in FY2020.

== List of military engagements ==
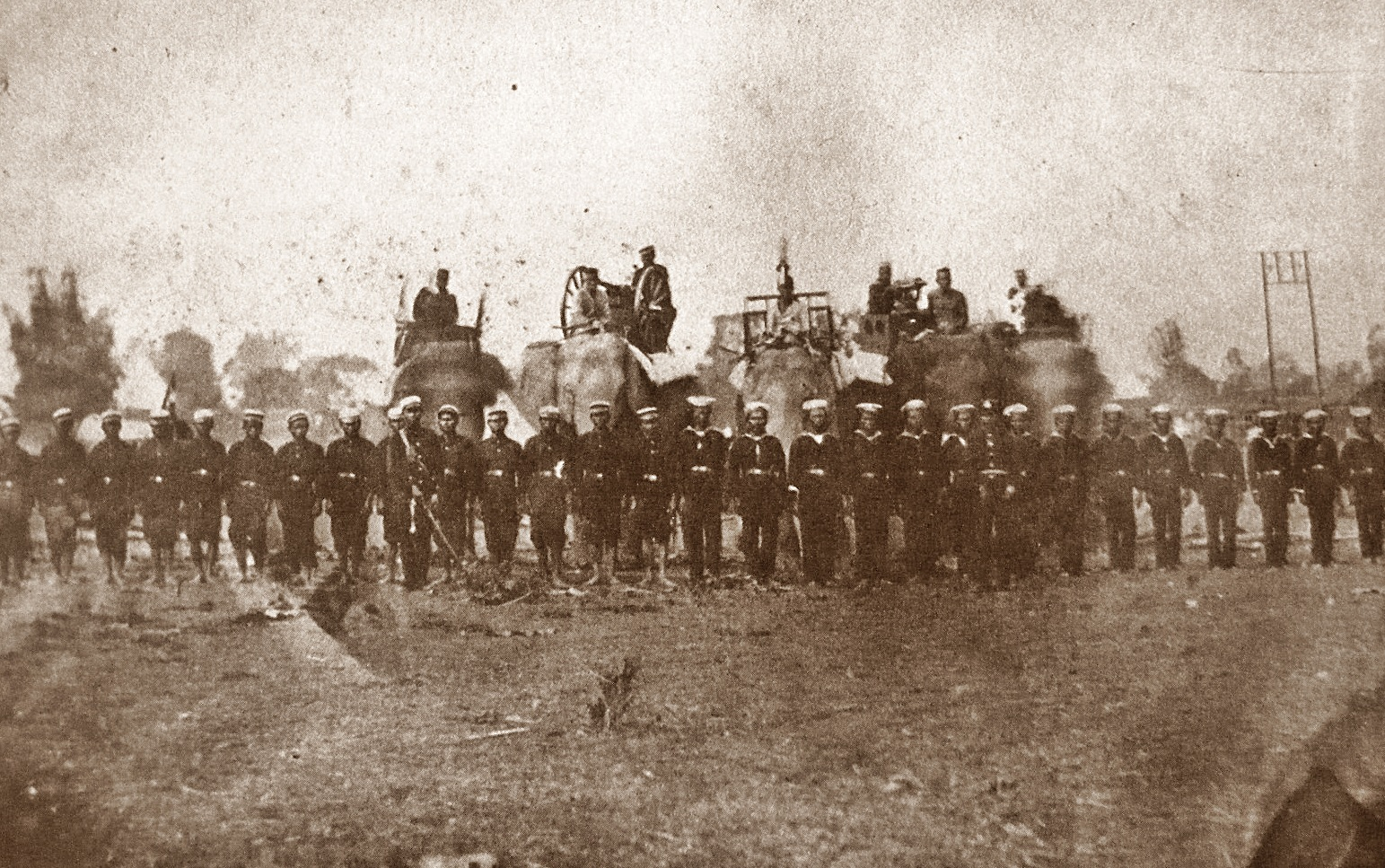
Army of Thailand (Siam) in Haw wars (1875)

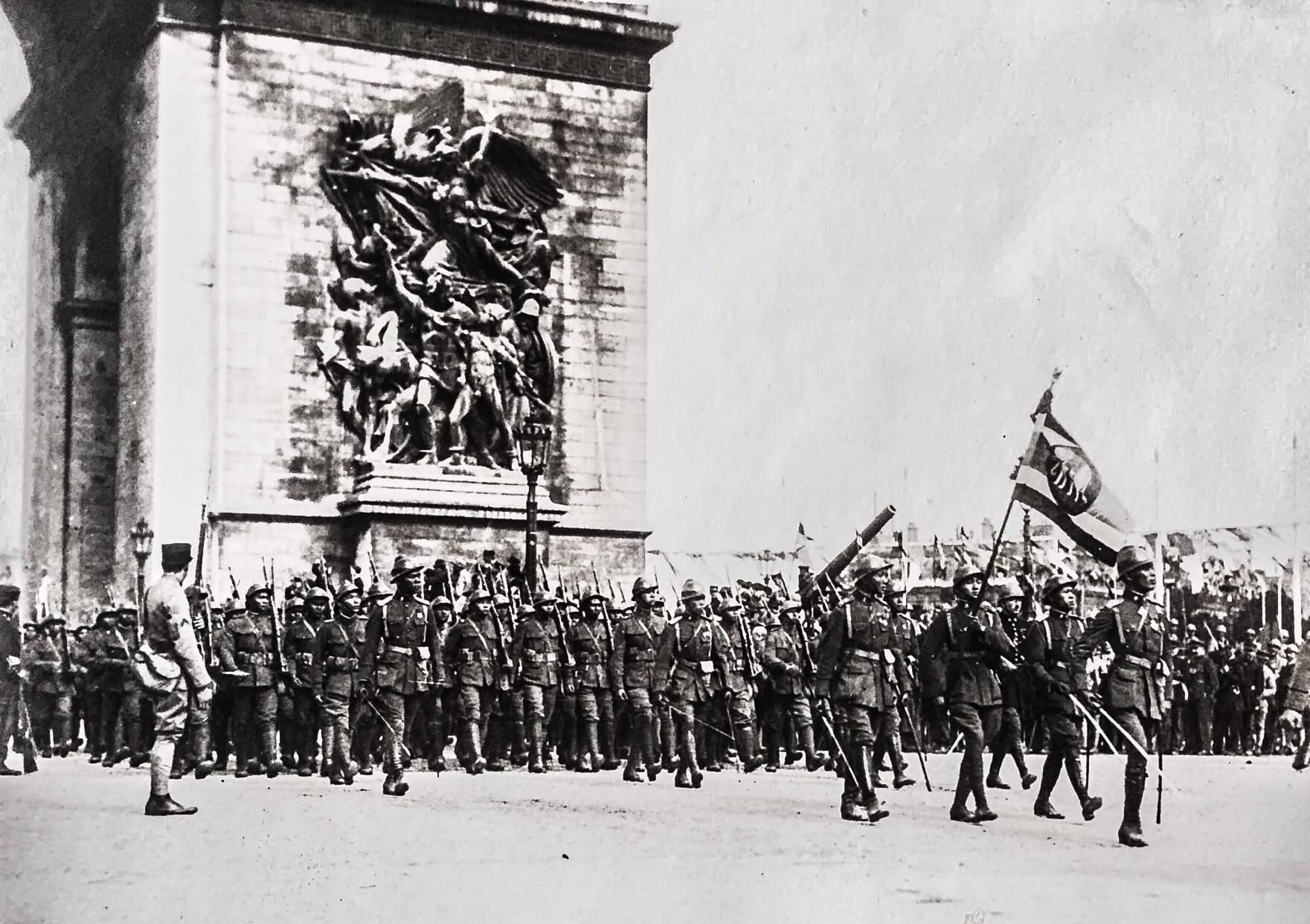
The Siamese Expeditionary Force in Paris, 1919

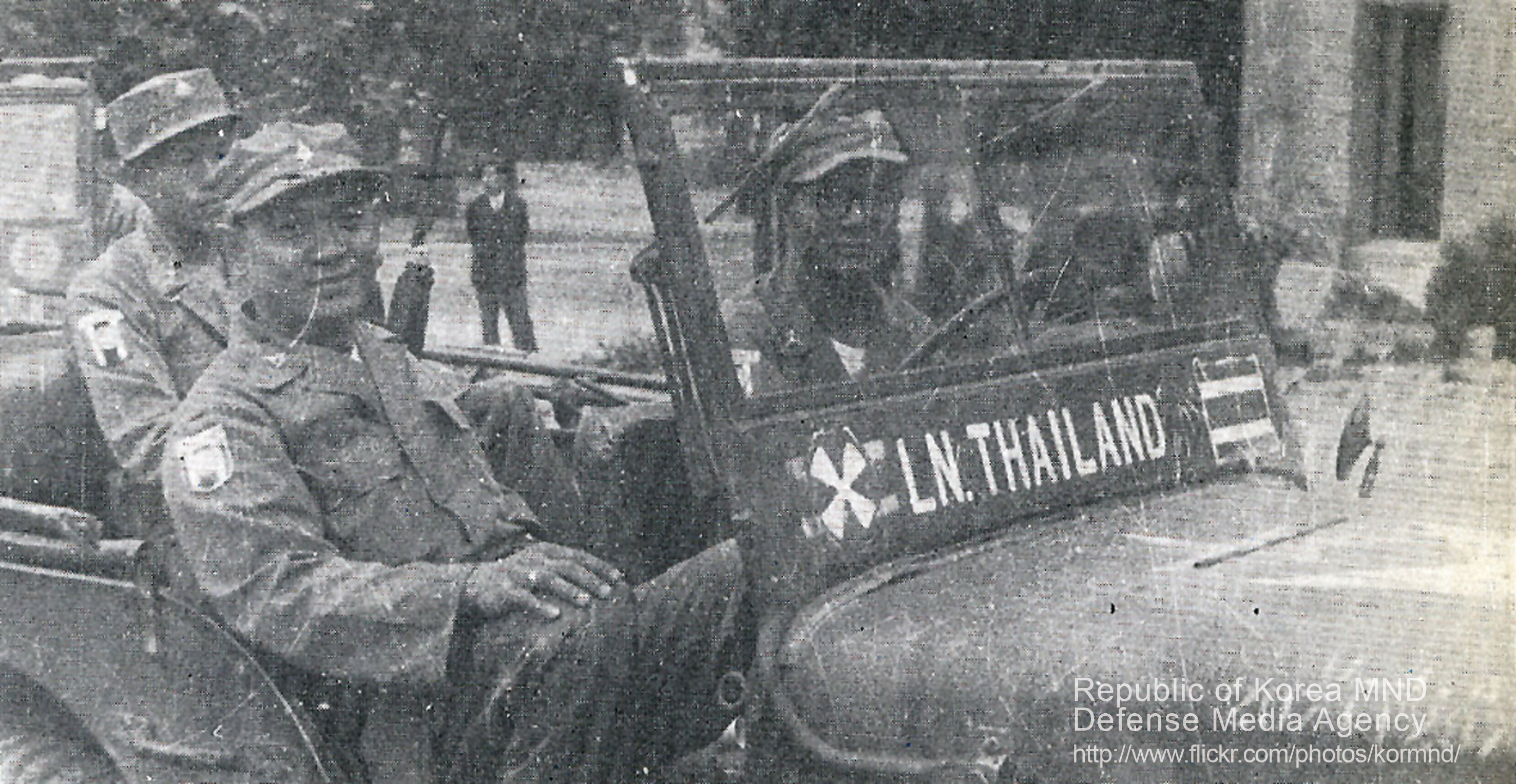
Thai soldiers arriving at Busan

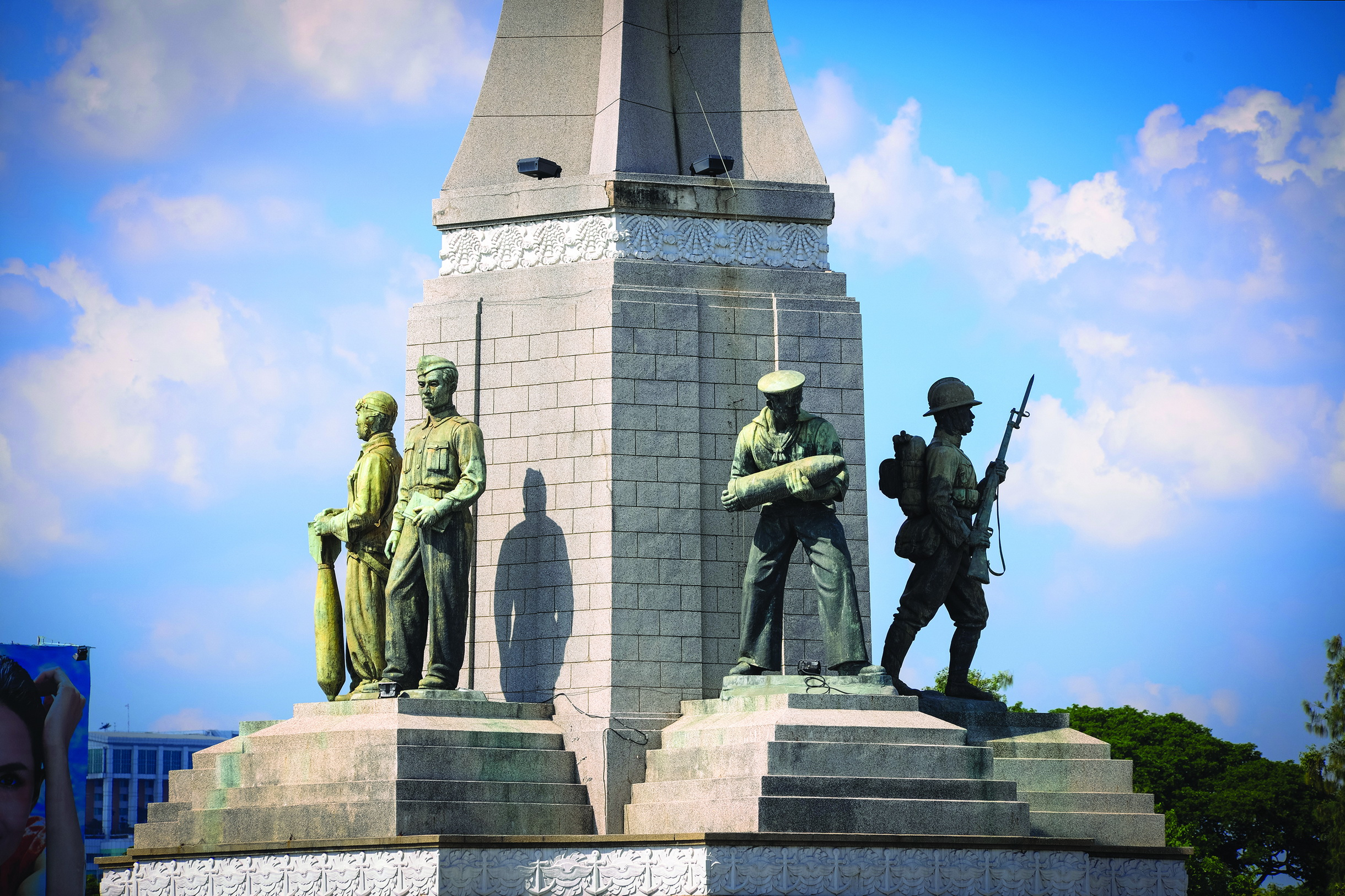
Five statues honour the army, navy, air force, police, and populace at Victory Monument.

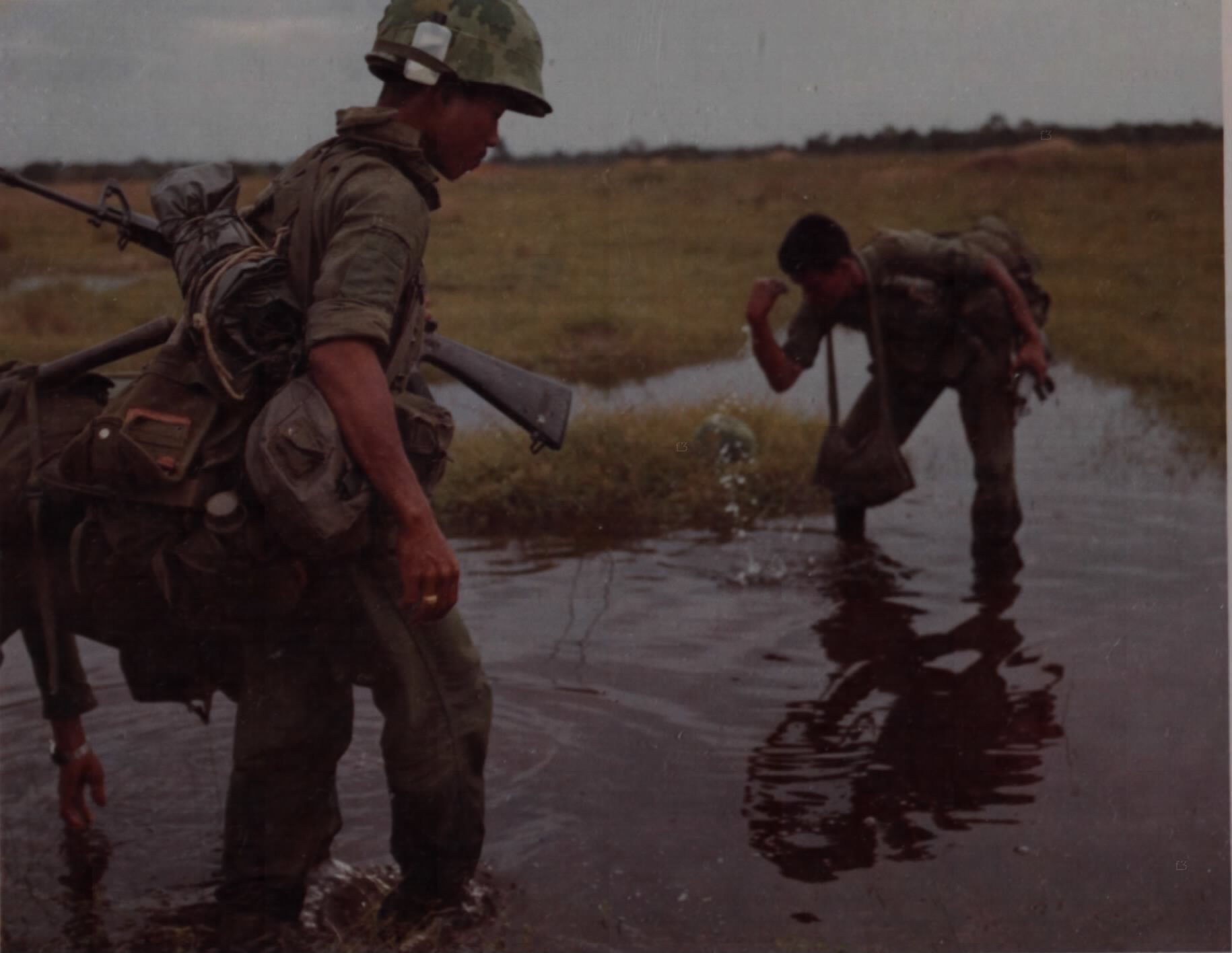
Thai soldiers wash in a small pool during a break in operations, Nhon Trac, 19 October 1967

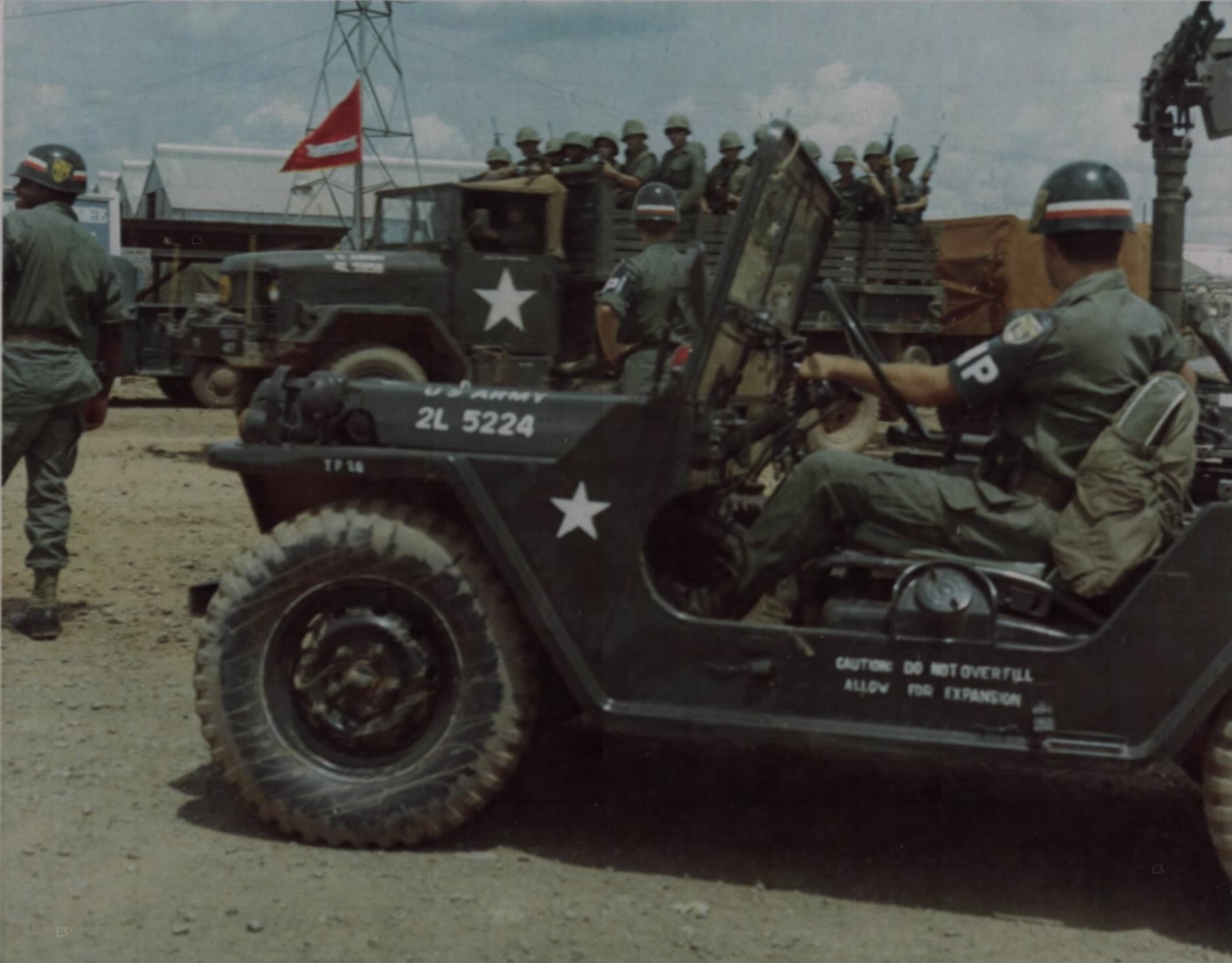
Military Police stop traffic to allow the 2 1/2-ton trucks carrying members of the Black Panther Division to leave Newport Docks, en route to Bearcat, 22 July 1968

- Burmese–Siamese wars
- Siamese–Vietnamese wars
- Anglo-Siamese War
- Siege of Bangkok
- First Anglo-Burmese War
- Haw wars
- Franco-Siamese conflict
- Holy Man's Rebellion
- World War I
  - Western Front
- Boworadet rebellion
- World War II
  - Franco-Thai War
  - Pacific War
  - South-East Asian Theatre
  - Burma Campaign
  - Malayan Campaign
- Cold War
  - Korean War
  - Malayan Emergency
  - Laotian Civil War
  - Cambodian Civil War
  - Vietnam War
  - Communist insurgency in Thailand
  - Communist insurgency in Malaysia
  - Communist insurgency in Burma
  - Third Indochina War
  - Indochina refugee crisis
  - Cambodian conflict (1979–1998)
  - Cambodian–Vietnamese War
  - Vietnamese border raids in Thailand
  - Thai–Laotian Border War
- Persian Gulf War
- War on drugs
  - Internal conflict in Myanmar
  - 2010–2012 Myanmar border clashes
- 1999 East Timorese crisis
  - International Force East Timor
- Global war on terrorism
  - Operation Enduring Freedom
  - Iraq War
  - OEF - Afghanistan
  - OEF - Horn of Africa
- Operation Pochentong
- Southern Insurgency
- United Nations peacekeeping
  - United Nations Iraq–Kuwait Observation Mission
  - United Nations Operation in Burundi
  - United Nations Transitional Administration in East Timor
  - United Nations–African Union Mission in Darfur
  - United Nations Assistance Mission in Afghanistan
  - United Nations Mission in Sudan
- Cambodia–Thailand border dispute
  - 2008–2013 Cambodian–Thai border crisis
  - 2025 Cambodian–Thai conflict
- Thai political crisis
  - 1933 Siamese coup d'état
  - Siamese coup d'état of 1947
  - Siamese coup d'état of 1948
  - Army General Staff plot (1948)
  - Silent Coup (1951)
  - 1973 Thai popular uprising
  - 1976 Thai coup d'état and 6 October massacre
  - October 1977 Thai coup d'état
  - 1981 Thai military rebellion
  - 1985 Thai coup d'état attempt
  - 1991 Thai coup d'état
    - Black May (1992)
  - 2006 Thai coup d'état
  - 2009 Thai political unrest
  - 2010 Thai political protests
  - 2014 Thai coup d'état

== Rank structure ==
Rank group	General / flag officers				Senior officers			Junior officers
Royal Thai Army
Royal Thai Army	จอมพล; Chom phon	พลเอก; Phon ek	พลโท; Phon tho	พลตรี Phon tri	พันเอก; Phan ek	พันโท; Phan tho	พันตรี Phan tri	ร้อยเอก; Roi ek	ร้อยโท; Roi tho	ร้อยตรี Roi tri

Rank group	Senior NCOs				Junior NCOs		Enlisted
Royal Thai Army							No insignia
Royal Thai Army	จ่าสิบเอก; Cha sip ek	จ่าสิบโท; Cha sip tho	จ่าสิบตรี Cha sip tri	สิบเอก; Sip ek	สิบโท; Sip tho	สิบตรี Sip tri	พลทหาร; Phon thahan

== Businesses and infrastructure ==
The army owns more than 30 golf courses nationwide. The army also owns boxing stadium, 100 petrol stations, racecourses, hotels, retail and coffee shops, and radio and television airwaves (by one count, the armed forces have ownership in 537 radio and TV stations). In early 2020, the army entered an agreement with the Finance Ministry to turn over to the ministry the management of businesses unrelated to the army's mission. In a related move, army commander General Apirat Kongsompong decreed that retired generals must move out of army-owned housing to free space for serving officers. As of 2020, about 100 retired generals and colonels inhabit army accommodations. Some ex-generals, like PM Prayut Chan-o-cha and deputy PM Prawit Wongsuwan were exempted immediately from eviction because of their "contribution to society". The Thai Defence Ministry position is that there is no law prohibiting retired officers from occupying military housing if legally authorized.

In January 2021, the RTA signed a memorandum of understanding with the Electricity Generating Authority of Thailand (EGAT) to study the feasibility of constructing solar farms on 4.5 million rai of army land to generate 30,000 megawatts of electricity. Following up, on 22 February 2021 a meeting was called by the President of Royal Thai Army Radio and Television Channel 5 with energy firms interested in winning a piece of what is projected to be a 600 billion baht project. The Energy Ministry was not represented at the meeting. Critics have questioned why the army is involved in energy procurement, in contravention of existing regulations, and why Thailand needs more electricity when it already has 59% reserve capacity and more capacity under construction.

== Broadcasting ==
=== Radio and television channel list ===
==== Free-to-air TV ====
- RTA 5
- Channel 7 (1967-2018), operated currently by Bangkok Broadcasting & Television Company Limited (BBTV)

==== Satellite TV ====
- TGN

==== Radio ====
- Royal Thai Army Radio Network, all 126 stations

== See also ==
- Royal Thai Armed Forces Headquarters
- Royal Thai Army Radio and Television
- Border Patrol Police
- Thahan Phran
- Battle of Phou Pha Thi, (Northeastern Laos, March 1968) covert Border Patrol "volunteers"
- Thai–Laotian Border War
- Cambodian–Thai border dispute
- Chao Phraya Bodindecha
- Military history of Thailand
- Rajabhakti Park
- Special forces of Thailand
