= Thai political crisis =

Thai political crisis may refer to:

- 1970s peasant revolts in Thailand
- 2005–06 Thai political crisis, a series of events that led to a military coup and the removal of Thaksin Shinawatra from power
- 2008 Thai political crisis, protests against the government of Samak Sundaravej by the People's Alliance for Democracy
- 2009 Thai political unrest, protests against the government of Abhisit Vejjajiva
- 2010 Thai political protests, protests against the government of Abhisit Vejjajiva
- 2013–14 Thai political crisis, protests against the government of Yingluck Shinawatra by the PDRC
- 2020–21 Thai protests, protests against the government of Prayut Chan-o-cha
- 2025 Thai political crisis The protest against the government of Paetongtarn Shinawatra over her criticism of Boonsin Padklang amid 2025 Cambodian–Thai border crisis

== See also ==
- History of Thailand since 2001, an overview of the entire period
