= Yano (disambiguation) =

Yano is a Filipino rock band.

Yano may also refer to:

- Yano (album), self-titled debut album of Yano
- Yano (surname), a Japanese surname
- 8906 Yano, an outer main-belt asteroid
- Yano (Ghost in the Shell), a character from Ghost in the Shell
- USNS Yano, a Shughart-class cargo ship
- Shabono or yano, a hut used by the Yanomami
