= Yano (surname) =

Yano (written: 矢野) is a Japanese surname. Notable people with the surname include:

- Akihiro Yano, Japanese baseball player
- Akiko Yano, Japanese pop and jazz musician
- Alexander B. Yano, 38th Chief of Staff of the Armed Forces of the Philippines
- Candace A. Yano, American academic
- Jonah Yano, Canadian musician
- Keiichi Yano (video game designer), Japanese video game designer
- Keita Yano, Japanese professional wrestler
- Kentaro Yano (mathematician)
- Kentarō Yano, manga artist
- Kisho Yano, Japanese footballer
- Maki Yano, Japanese J-pop singer
- Rodney J. T. Yano, United States Army soldier
- Shiho Yano (矢野 志保, born 1976), Japanese model
- Sho Yano, Asian-American child prodigy
- Takashi Yano, Japanese politician
- Takeo Yano, Japanese judoka
- Tetsu Yano (矢野 徹, 1923–2004), Japanese science fiction translator and writer
- Tetsuro Yano, Japanese politician
- Toshi Yano, American bass guitarist
- Toshinobu Yano, Japanese photographer
- Toru Yano, Japanese professional wrestler
