= Toshinobu =

- Pronunciation: toɕinobɯ (IPA)
- Gender: Male

Origin
- Origin: Japanese
- Meaning: Different meanings depending on the kanji used

Other names
- Alternative spelling: Tosinobu (Kunrei-shiki) Tosinobu (Nihon-shiki) Toshinobu (Hepburn)

Toshinobu is a masculine Japanese given name.

== Written forms ==
Toshinobu can be written using different combinations of kanji characters. Here are some examples:

- 敏信, "agile, to believe"
- 敏伸, "agile, to extend"
- 敏延, "agile, to extend"
- 俊信, "talented, to believe"
- 俊伸, "talented, to extend"
- 俊延, "talented, to extend"
- 寿信, "long life, to believe"
- 寿伸, "long life, to extend"
- 寿延, "long life, to extend"
- 利信, "benefit, to believe"
- 利伸, "benefit, to extend"
- 利延, "benefit, to extend"
- 年信, "year, to believe"
- 年伸, "year, to extend"
- 年延, "year, to extend"

The name can also be written in hiragana としのぶ or katakana トシノブ.

== Notable people with the name ==
- Toshinobu Katsuya (勝矢 寿延; born 1961), Japanese footballer
- Toshinobu Kawai (河合 季信; born 1967), Japanese speed skater
- Toshinobu Kubota (久保田 利伸; born 1962), Japanese singer-songwriter, musician, music producer, and radio personality
- Toshinobu Nakasato (仲里 利信; born 1937), Japanese politician
- Toshinobu Okumura (奥村 利信, birth and death unknown), Japanese ukiyo-e artist
- Toshinobu Onosato (小野里 利信, 1912–1986), Japanese printmaker
- Toshinobu Yano (矢野 敏延), Japanese photographer
