= John E. Warren Jr. =

United States Army Medal of Honor recipient

John Earl Warren Jr.
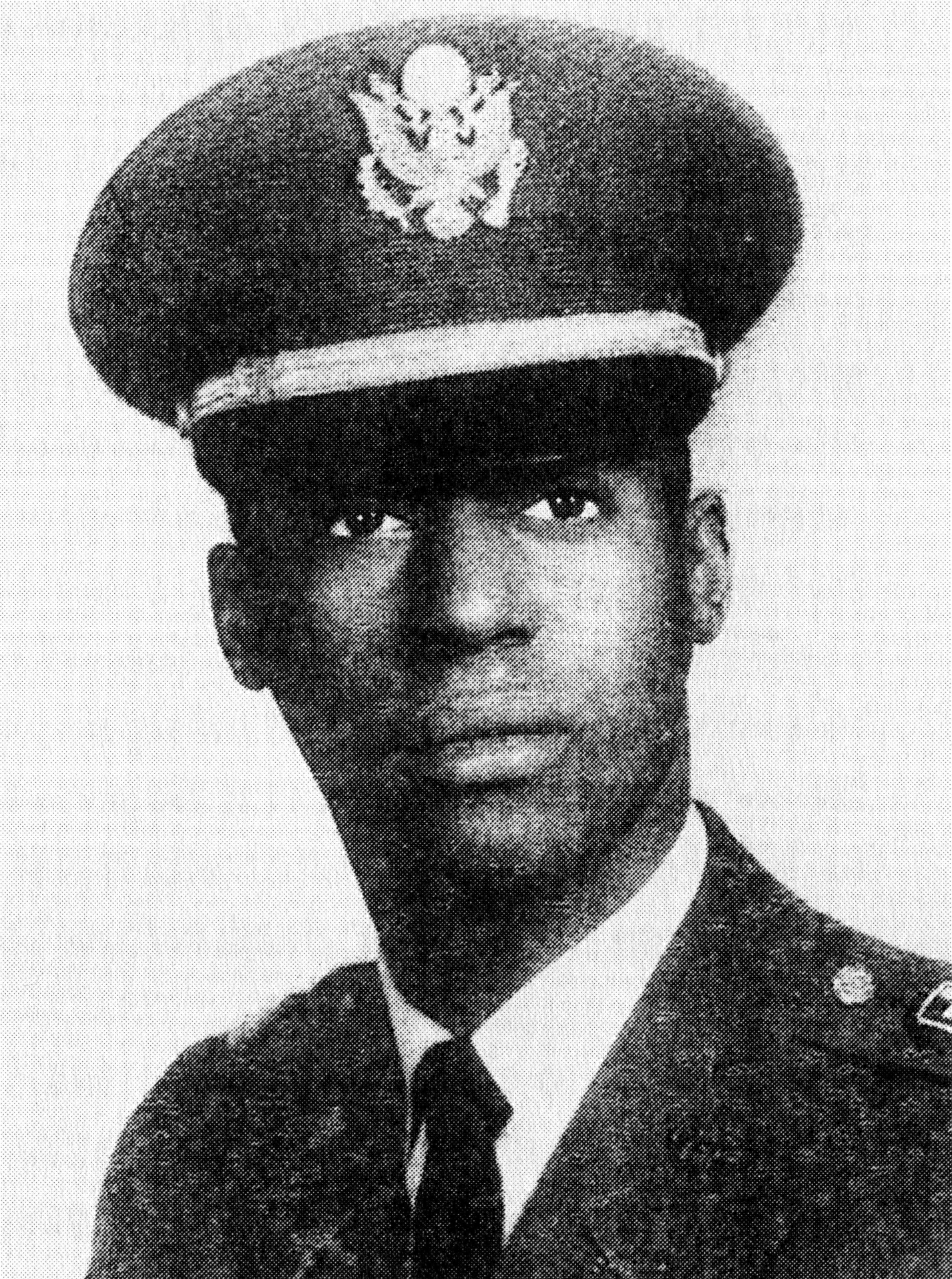
- First Lieutenant John Warren
- Born: November 16, 1946; New York City, U.S.
- Died: January 14, 1969 (aged 22); Tây Ninh Province, South Vietnam
- Burial place: Long Island National Cemetery
- Military career
- Allegiance: United States of America
- Branch: United States Army
- Service years: 1967–1969
- Rank: First Lieutenant
- Units: Company C, 2d Battalion, (Mechanized), 22d Infantry, 25th Infantry Division
- Conflicts: Vietnam War †
- Awards: Medal of Honor; Silver Star Medal; Bronze Star Medal; Purple Heart

John Earl Warren Jr. (November 16, 1946 – January 14, 1969) was a United States Army officer and a recipient of the U.S. military's highest decoration — the Medal of Honor — for his actions in the Vietnam War.

== Early life and education ==
Warren joined the U.S. Army from New York City in 1967.

== Career ==
On January 14, 1969, as a first lieutenant, Warren was commanding a platoon in Tây Ninh Province, South Vietnam as part of Operation Toan Thang II, when the unit came under attack. During the fight, Warren fell on an enemy-thrown grenade to shield others from the blast. The action cost him his life.

=== Medal of Honor citation ===
Warren's official Medal of Honor citation reads:

For conspicuous gallantry and intrepidity in action at the risk of his life above and beyond the call of duty. 1st Lt. Warren, distinguished himself at the cost of his life while serving as a platoon leader with Company C. While moving through a rubber plantation to reinforce another friendly unit, Company C came under intense fire from a well-fortified enemy force. Disregarding his safety, 1st Lt. Warren with several of his men began maneuvering through the hail of enemy fire toward the hostile positions. When he had come to within 6 feet of one of the enemy bunkers and was preparing to toss a hand grenade into it, an enemy grenade was suddenly thrown into the middle of his small group. Thinking only of his men, 1st Lt. Warren fell in the direction of the grenade, thus shielding those around him from the blast. His action, performed at the cost of his life, saved 3 men from serious or mortal injury. First Lt. Warren's ultimate action of sacrifice to save the lives of his men was in keeping with the highest traditions of the military service and reflects great credit on him, his unit, and the U.S. Army.

== Legacy ==
Warren is buried in Long Island National Cemetery, Farmingdale, New York.

In May 2022, the main street on Fort Hamilton Army Base in Brooklyn, New York was renamed John Warren Avenue in his honor. The street was originally named for confederate general Robert E. Lee.

The Skills Development Center Schofield Barracks Army Base on Oahu, Hawaii is named in his honor.

== See also ==
- List of Medal of Honor recipients for the Vietnam War
