= Harold A. Fritz =

United States Army Medal of Honor recipient (born 1944)

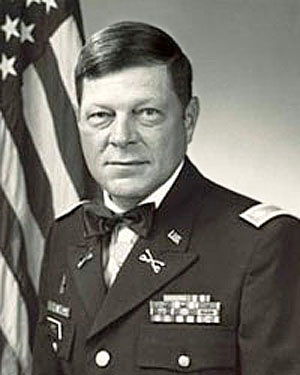
- Born: February 21, 1944 (age 82); Chicago, Illinois, U.S.
- Military career
- Allegiance: United States
- Branch: United States Army
- Service years: 1966–1993
- Rank: Lieutenant Colonel
- Nickname: "Hal"
- Unit: 11th Armored Cavalry Regiment
- Conflicts: Vietnam War
- Awards: Medal of Honor; Silver Star; Legion of Merit; Bronze Star Medal (2); Purple Heart (2)

Harold Arthur "Hal" Fritz (born February 21, 1944) is a retired United States Army officer and a recipient of the United States military's highest decoration, the Medal of Honor, for his actions during the Vietnam War.

== Military career ==
After earning a degree in elementary education from the University of Tampa, Fritz joined the United States Army from Milwaukee, Wisconsin in 1966. By January 11, 1969, he was serving as a first lieutenant in Troop A, 1st Squadron, 11th Armored Cavalry Regiment. During a firefight on that day, in Bình Long Province, South Vietnam during Operation Toan Thang II, Fritz showed conspicuous leadership despite being seriously wounded. He was subsequently promoted to captain and awarded the Medal of Honor for his actions.

Fritz reached the rank of lieutenant colonel before retiring from the army after 27 years of service. In addition to his Medal of Honor, Fitz was awarded the Silver Star, Legion of Merit, Bronze Star Medal with "V" device and oak leaf cluster, Purple Heart with oak leaf cluster, Defense Meritorious Service Medal, Meritorious Service Medal with two oak leaf clusters, and the Army Commendation Medal with oak leaf cluster.

== Later life ==
Fritz currently lives in Peoria, Illinois, and works there at the Department of Veterans Affairs' Bob Michel Outpatient clinic.

In October 2024, Fritz joined 15 other Medal of Honor recipients in publicly endorsing Donald Trump for president.

== Medal of Honor citation ==
Captain Fritz's Medal of Honor citation reads:

For conspicuous gallantry and intrepidity in action at the risk of his life above and beyond the call of duty. Capt. (then 1st Lt.) Fritz, Armor, U.S. Army, distinguished himself while serving as a platoon leader with Troop A, near Quản Lợi. Capt. Fritz was leading his 7-vehicle armored column along Highway 13 to meet and escort a truck convoy when the column suddenly came under intense crossfire from a reinforced enemy company deployed in ambush positions. In the initial attack, Capt. Fritz' vehicle was hit and he was seriously wounded. Realizing that his platoon was completely surrounded, vastly outnumbered, and in danger of being overrun, Capt. Fritz leaped to the top of his burning vehicle and directed the positioning of his remaining vehicles and men. With complete disregard for his wounds and safety, he ran from vehicle to vehicle in complete view of the enemy gunners in order to reposition his men, to improve the defenses, to assist the wounded, to distribute ammunition, to direct fire, and to provide encouragement to his men. When a strong enemy force assaulted the position and attempted to overrun the platoon, Capt. Fritz manned a machine gun and through his exemplary action inspired his men to deliver intense and deadly fire which broke the assault and routed the attackers. Moments later a second enemy force advanced to within 2 meters of the position and threatened to overwhelm the defenders. Capt. Fritz, armed only with a pistol and bayonet, led a small group of his men in a fierce and daring charge which routed the attackers and inflicted heavy casualties. When a relief force arrived, Capt. Fritz saw that it was not deploying effectively against the enemy positions, and he moved through the heavy enemy fire to direct its deployment against the hostile positions. This deployment forced the enemy to abandon the ambush site and withdraw. Despite his wounds, Capt. Fritz returned to his position, assisted his men, and refused medical attention until all of his wounded comrades had been treated and evacuated. The extraordinary courage and selflessness displayed by Capt. Fritz, at the repeated risk of his own life above and beyond the call of duty, were in keeping with the highest traditions of the U.S. Army and reflect the greatest credit upon himself, his unit, and the Armed Forces.

== See also ==
- List of Medal of Honor recipients for the Vietnam War
