= Operation Toan Thang II =

Part of the Vietnam War (1968–1969)

- Part of Vietnam War
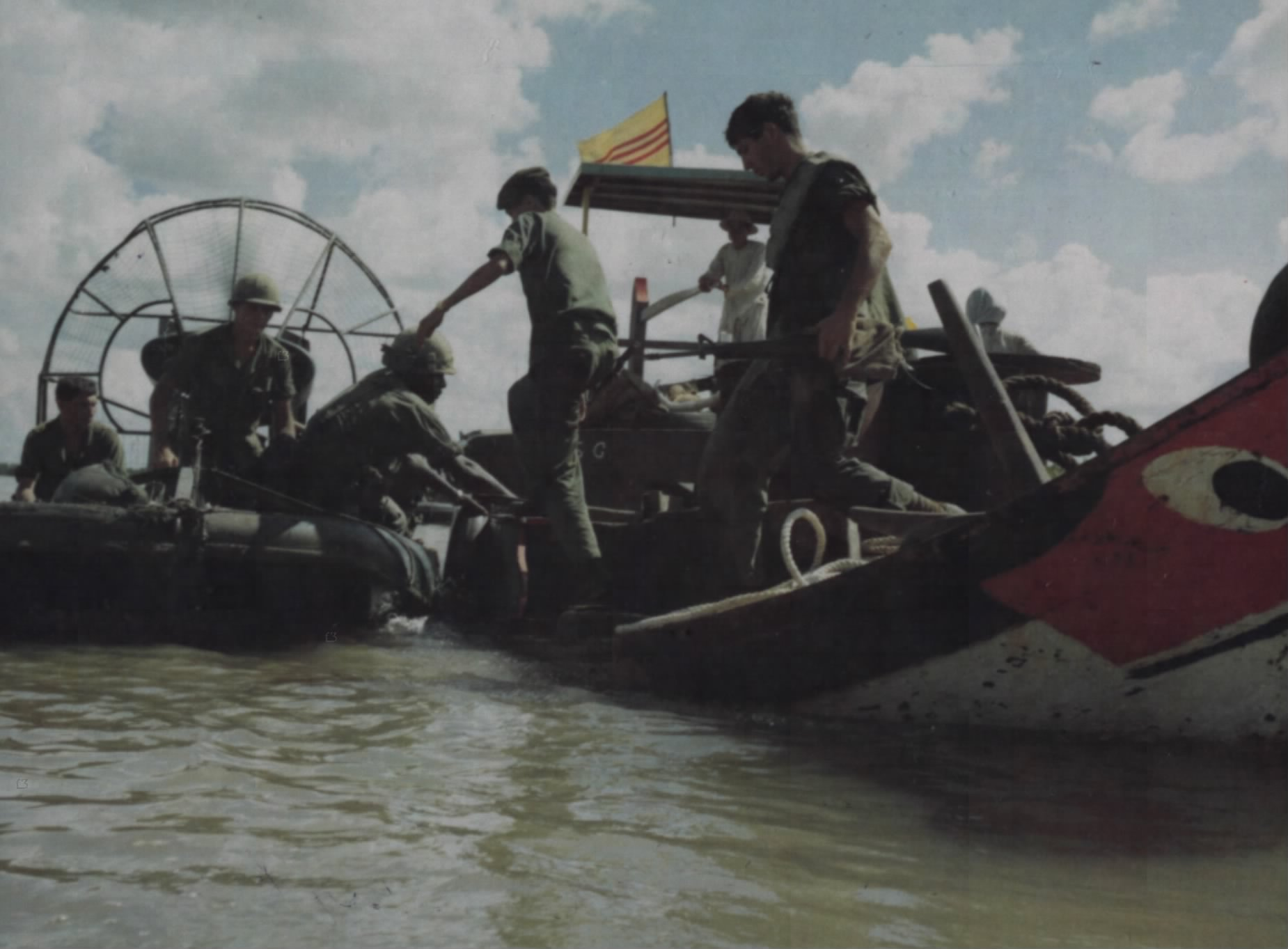
- Troops from Company "D", 5th Battalion, 12th Infantry Regiment search a sampan
Date	1 June 1968 – 16 February 1969
Location	III Corps, South Vietnam
Result	Allied operational success

Belligerents
United States; South Vietnam; Thailand	(Provisional Revolutionary Government of the Republic of South Vietnam) Viet Cong; North Vietnam

Commanders and leaders
(United States) MG Frederick C. Weyand; MG Walter T. Kerwin Jr. (South Vietnam) LTG Đỗ Cao Trí	

Units involved
(United States) 1st Infantry Division; 9th Infantry Division; 25th Infantry Division; 1st Cavalry Division; 3rd Brigade, 82nd Airborne Division; 11th Armored Cavalry Regiment; 199th Light Infantry Brigade; 12th Combat Aviation Group; River Patrol Force (TF-116) (South Vietnam) 5th Division; 18th Division; 25th Division; Airborne Division (Thailand) Royal Thai Army Expeditionary Division	1st Division; 5th Division; 7th Division; 9th Division

Casualties and losses
United States 1,798 killed	U.S. body count: 25,428 killed 10,724 captured 10,285 individual and 2,307 crew-served weapons recovered

Operation Toan Thang II ("Complete Victory") was an operation conducted by the US Army and the Army of the Republic of Vietnam (ARVN) during the Vietnam War between 1 June 1968 and 16 February 1969. It was designed to keep pressure on the Viet Cong (VC) and the People's Army of Vietnam (PAVN) forces at III Corps.

== Background ==
The operation was a continuation of Operation Toan Thang I—in the same operational area and with largely the same forces.

== Operation ==
=== June ===
On 1 June, a unit of the 2nd Brigade, 1st Infantry Division found a PAVN/VC base camp near Dầu Tiếng Base Camp with an arms cache containing 81 SKS rifles, three light machine guns, and two radios. At 14:25, a unit of the 1st Brigade (9th Infantry Division) air assaulted into a hot landing zone near Bến Lức District and engaged PAVN/VC forces, who withdrew at 19:15, leaving 11 dead. U.S. losses were five killed and a UH-1 Iroquois was shot down 12 miles (19 km) west of Saigon.

On 2 June, between 01:40 and 03:25, 15 rounds of mortar/rocket fire hit Saigon killing five civilians and destroying three houses. At 11:15, helicopter gunships from the cavalry squadron of the 25th Infantry Division engaged enemy forces 6 miles (9.7 km) west of Phú Cường and cavalry troops were later landed in the area. The enemy withdrew at 18:00, leaving 33 dead among 37 destroyed bunkers. At 13:40, a unit of the 199th Light Infantry Brigade (199th LIB) engaged an enemy force 7 miles (11 km) northeast of Tân Uyên. The enemy withdrew at 18:15 leaving 12 dead; U.S. losses were 3 killed.

On 4 June, between 01:03 and 01:45, 40 rounds of mortar/rocket fire hit Saigon injuring 12 civilians and causing minor damage to two ships. On 5 June at 01:25, a unit of the 11th Armored Cavalry Regiment (11th ACR) received 50 rounds of mortar fire in a night defensive position near Trảng Bàng District. The unit returned fire, supported by artillery and an AC-47 Spooky gunship, and the enemy withdrew at 02:50 leaving seven dead and one captured and two individual and two crew-served weapons. The base camp and village at Lai Khê was hit by five 122 mm rockets killing three civilians.

On 6 June, six mortar/rocket rounds hit Chợ Lớn killing 11 civilians. At 15:30, ten rounds of 82 mm mortar fire hit Gia Định Province killing two civilians. At 18:46, eight rounds of 82 mm mortar fire hit Bảo Trị, injuring nine civilians. A unit of the 25th Infantry Division engaged an enemy force near Hóc Môn District supported by artillery, helicopter gunships, and airstrikes killing 32 PAVN/VC troops; U.S. losses were four killed. A UH-1 was shot down 8 miles (13 km) north of central Saigon.

At 03:00 on 7 June, 13 rockets hit Saigon killing two civilians. Two companies of the 9th Infantry Division supported by helicopter gunships from the 1st Cavalry Division engaged an enemy company 24 miles (39 km) west of Ty Tho killing 17 and capturing two and one individual weapon. On 8 June, 22 82 mm mortar rounds hit Saigon. At 18:50, five 82 mm mortar rounds hit Sông Bé Province killing two civilians. On 9 June at 03:00, three rounds of mortar fire hit the vicinity of the Newport Bridge. Bien Hoa Air Base received 35 rounds of mortar fire; at 23:30 of the same day, four rounds of mortar fire hit the area clost to the Cha Va Bridge.

On 10 June, between 02:05 and 02:10, ten 122 mm rockets hit Saigon, killing seven civilians. On 11 June, between 06:15 and 06:25, 25 122 mm rockets hit Saigon killing 19 civilians. On 12 June, ten 122 mm rockets hit Tan Son Nhut Air Base killing two U.S. civilians and four Vietnamese civilians. A unit of the 2nd Brigade, 25th Infantry Division engaged an enemy force in Bình Dương Province 10 miles (16 km) northwest of Saigon killing 13. On 13 June, a unit of the 1st Brigade, 25th Infantry Division, found four submerged sampans with nine 122 mm rockets in Gia Định Province 9 miles (14 km) north-northwest of Saigon. A unit of the 3rd Brigade, 1st Infantry Division found 22 107 mm rockets 6 miles (9.7 km) northeast of Saigon.

On 14 June at 14:15, an aerial observer sighted a bunker complex 4.5 miles (7.2 km) southwest of Bến Cát and directed artillery and airstrikes onto the area killing 15 PAVN/VC. On 15 June at 01:15, 20 mortar rounds hit southwest Saigon injuring two policemen and three civilians. At 03:00, 60 107 mm rockets hit Bien Hoa Air Base causing minimal damage. South Vietnamese Marines found 42 mortar rounds and ten RPG-2 rounds 7 miles (11 km) east-northeast of Saigon. At 18:00, a unit of the 2nd Brigade, 1st Infantry Division found eight 107 mm rockets in the same general area.

On 16 June at 02:50, a unit of the 2nd Brigade, the 25th Infantry Division, which was in a night defensive position in Gia Định Province, received mortar fire followed by a ground attack. The unit returned fire supported by artillery, helicopter gunships, and an AC-47; the enemy withdrew at 09:40 leaving 52 dead and 21 individual and four crew-served weapons; U.S. losses were three killed. At 14:45, a unit of the 1st Brigade, 1st Infantry Division engaged an enemy force 4 miles (6.4 km) southwest of Dĩ An Base Camp killing 25 for the loss of eleven U.S. soldiers On 17 June, a unit of the 1st Brigade, 1st Infantry Division engaged an enemy force 4 miles (6.4 km) southwest of Dĩ An. The battle continued until early morning when the enemy withdrew leaving 25 dead; U.S. losses were 11 killed. On 18 June, a unit of the 2nd Brigade, 25th Infantry Division found a weapons cache 2 miles (3.2 km) northeast of Hóc Môn containing seven individual and seven crew-served weapons; nine 82 mm mortars, 32 122 mm rocket warheads, 88 RPG-2 rounds and 13,000 rounds of 7.62×39mm ammunition. On 19 June, a unit of the 2nd Brigade, 25th Infantry Division air assaulted into a hot landing zone and engaged an enemy force in Bình Dương Province 12 miles (19 km) north-northeast of Saigon. At 17:30, a unit of the 3rd Brigade, 1st Infantry Division engaged an enemy force 6 miles (9.7 km) south of Phước Vĩnh Base Camp supported by artillery, helicopter gunships, and AC-47s. The enemy withdrew at 19:05 leaving 39 dead; U.S. losses were two killed. A unit of the 3rd Brigade found four 107 mm rockets 6 miles east of Saigon.

On 20 June, the 2nd Brigade, 25th Infantry Division, swept the area 12 miles (19 km) north-northeast of Saigon that it had assaulted the previous day finding 44 PAVN/VC dead and seven individual weapons; U.S. losses were 15 killed. A unit of the same Brigade found 17 PAVN/VC killed by artillery and airstrikes 5 miles (8.0 km) north-northwest of Phú Thọ Racetrack. At 18:30, a unit of the 3rd Brigade, 25th Infantry Division, engaged an enemy unit 9 miles (14 km) northwest of Saigon killing 12 and capturing five individuals and two crew-served weapons. At 23:39, five 122 mm rockets hit northern Saigon killing six civilians. On 21 June at 00:15, five 107 mm rockets hit Tan Son Nhut Air Base killing six civilians. At 11:45, a unit of the 3rd Brigade, 101st Airborne Division engaged two reinforced enemy companies near Hiệp Hòa, the enemy withdrew at 21:30, leaving 35 dead; U.S. losses were one killed.

On 22 June at 02:15, eight mortar/rocket rounds hit the Saigon docks causing minor damage. On 23 June, a unit of the 1st Brigade, 9th Infantry Division, received fire 2 miles (3.2 km) southeast of Bến Lức and returned fire supported by artillery, airstrikes, and AC-47 fire. The enemy withdrew at 23:45, and a sweep the next morning found 41 PAVN/VC dead, two captured and 11 individual and five crew-served weapons; U.S. losses were four killed. On 24 June at 09:20, an OH-6 Cayuse light observation helicopter was shot down 6 miles (9.7 km) east-northeast of Tân An killing both crewmen. At 10:20, a unit of the 3rd Brigade, 9th Infantry Division, engaged an enemy force in the same area; other units reinforced and the enemy withdrew at 23:00. A sweep of the area the next day revealed 46 PAVN/VC dead and 13 weapons captured; U.S. losses were five killed. A United States Air Force (USAF) forward air controller (FAC) saw enemy forces 4 miles (6.4 km) south-southwest of Phú Cường and directed airstrikes onto the area. A subsequent sweep by the 17th Cavalry Regiment found 20 PAVN/VC dead.

From 23 June, Australia's 4th Battalion (4 RAR/NZ) joined the operation, deploying to the Biên Hòa-Long Khánh Province border to assist their 1st Battalion (1 RAR). 4 RAR/NZ's role was to seal enemy infiltration routes into Saigon and to identify rocket-launching sites. Only one contact was made by the New Zealand infantry company of 4 RAR/NZ. On 3 July, 1 RAR left the operation.

On 25 June at 07:55, two UH-1s collided 4 miles (6.4 km) west of Bearcat Base killing 12 U.S. Army personnel, 16 Thai soldiers and one ARVN soldier. A unit of the 1st Brigade, 9th Infantry Division, engaged an enemy force 5 miles (8.0 km) northeast of Tân An killing two and capturing five. On 26 June, units of the 1st and 3rd Brigades of the 9th Infantry Division continued to engage the enemy force northeast of Tân An. The enemy withdrew at 15:00 leaving 40 dead, 9 captured and 16 individual and two crew-served weapons; U.S. losses were 11 killed. At midday on 27 June, a unit of the ARVN 25th Division found 126 rockets 13 miles (21 km) northwest of Saigon, while Phu Loi Base Camp was hit by 15 mortar rounds.

On 28 June, units of the 1st and 3rd Brigades, 9th Infantry Division, engaged an enemy company 3 miles (4.8 km) southwest of Bến Lức. Action continued until 06:00 on 29 June and resulted in 30 PAVN/VC and five U.S. troops killed. On 30 June at 09:00, a company from the 3rd Brigade, 25th Infantry Division, engaged two enemy platoons 5 miles (8.0 km) north of Go Dau Ha killing 18 and capturing two for the loss of two U.S. killed.

Operational results for the month were 1,533 PAVN/VC killed, 520 captured and 574 individual and 89 crew-served weapons captured. U.S. losses were 181 killed.

=== July ===
On 3 July at 02:20, Dầu Tiếng Base Camp received 450 rounds of 60mm mortar fire and 50 107mm rockets followed by a ground assault, the defenders from the 3rd Brigade, 25th Infantry Division, fought back supported by AC-47 fire; U.S. losses were 5 killed. At 09:00 a unit of the 3rd Brigade, 1st Infantry Division, found a weapons cache in Biên Hòa Province containing four 122 mm rockets and one 107 mm rocket. At 11:30 a company from the 3rd Brigade, 9th Infantry Division, engaged an enemy platoon 6 miles (9.7 km) northeast of Tân An supported by helicopter gunships with unknown results. At 16:45, a UH-1 was shot down 3 miles (4.8 km) south of Bến Lức with seven U.S. missing.

On 4 July, a unit of the 1st Brigade, 1st Infantry Division, found a bunker complex and weapons cache in Bình Dương Province containing seven RPG-7 launchers, 110 RPG-7 grenades and an 82 mm mortar. On 5 July at 16;50, a company from the 2nd Brigade, 25th Infantry Division, found a weapons cache in Bình Dương Province, 12 miles (19 km) north-northwest of Saigon containing seven 122 mm rocket motors and four warheads.

On 8 July at 02:00, five mortar rounds hit the Nhà Bè tank farm causing minimal damage. A unit from the 1st Brigade, 9th Infantry Division, engaged an enemy force 4 miles (6.4 km) southwest of Cần Đước District killing 17 for the loss of one killed. On 9 July at 01:00, United States Navy Patrol Boat, Rivers (PBR) attacked three enemy sampans on the Đồng Nai river killing three PAVN/VC. A company from the 1st Brigade, 25th Infantry Division, operating 8 miles (13 km) north of Saigon found 12 PAVN/VC dead killed by artillery fire in the previous two days.

On 10 July at 14:40, a unit of the cavalry squadron of the 25th Infantry Division engaged an enemy platoon 6 miles (9.7 km) north-northwest of Trảng Bàng killing 23. On 11 July, a unit of the 1st Brigade, 9th Infantry Division engaged 25 PAVN/VC 18 miles (29 km) southwest of Saigon killing ten. On 13 July, a unit of the 1st Brigade, 25th Infantry Division found five 107 mm rockets warheads 9 miles (14 km) west of Saigon. On 15 July, a unit of the 1st Brigade, 9th Infantry Division engaged an enemy force 11 miles (18 km) northeast of Tân An killing 76 and capturing six individual and six crew-served weapons; U.S. losses were seven killed.

On 16 July, a company from the 3rd Brigade, 1st Infantry Division found a munitions cache 3 miles (4.8 km) south of Thủ Đức District containing 340 grenades and 57 rounds of recoilless rifle ammunition. On 17 July, U.S. helicopter gunships supported the ARVN 25th Division in an action 6 miles (9.7 km) northwest of Bến Lức that killed 13 PAVN/VC. On 18 July, a unit of the 11th ACR engaged an enemy force 2 miles (3.2 km) east-northeast of Lộc Ninh killing 34 PAVN/VC and capturing three and 16 individual and six crew-served weapons; U.S. losses were four killed.

On 20 July at midnight, five 107 mm rockets hit the Nhà Bè tank farm causing minimal damage. On 22 July, a company from the 1st Brigade, 1st Infantry Division, found graves containing 13 PAVN/VC dead 4 miles (6.4 km) southwest of Bến Cát. A unit of the 2nd Brigade, 1st Infantry Division, patrolling in Bình Dương Province, found a supply cache containing four individual weapons, assorted munitions and food. Mechanized infantry from the 1st Brigade, 25th Infantry Division engaged an enemy company 3 miles (4.8 km) north of Go Dau Ha killing 13.

On 24 July at 10:40, Civilian Irregular Defense Group program (CIDG) forces supported by artillery, helicopter gunships, airstrikes and a unit of the 11th ACR engaged an enemy force 2 miles (3.2 km) west of Lộc Ninh killing 21 PAVN/VC; U.S. losses were one killed. On 25 July at 08:15, a unit of the 3rd Brigade, 25th Infantry Division, was ambushed by an enemy force 2 miles northeast of Trảng Bàng killing 20 and capturing one individual and two crew-served weapons; U.S. losses were 13 killed. The air cavalry squadron of the 25th Infantry Division attacked 15 PAVN/VC 10 miles (16 km) north of Tân An killing 10 and capturing two and five sampans loaded with weapons.

On 26 July at 17:15, a unit of the 1st Brigade, 9th Infantry Division, operating 9 miles (14 km) northeast of Tân An killed 18 PAVN/VC and captured five individual weapons. A unit from the 1st Brigade, 1st Infantry Division, found a 70-ton rice cache 11 miles (18 km) east-northeast of Lộc Ninh. On 27 July, a company from the 1st Brigade, 9th Infantry Division, patrolling in Long An Province found two sampans carrying munitions including 212 60 mm mortar rounds and 35 RPG-2 grenades. On 30 July, an OH-6 was shot down 4 miles (6.4 km) northwest of Go Dau Ha. On 31 July, a unit of the 1st Brigade, 1st Infantry Division found a 25-ton rice cache in Bình Long Province.

Cumulative operational results to the end of July were 2,479 PAVN/VC killed, 1,119 captured and 836 individual and 184 crew-served weapons captured. U.S. losses were 319 killed. U.S. intelligence determined that during the month that the 7th Division had relocated to northern Bình Long Province while the 9th Division had moved from Hậu Nghĩa Province to western Tây Ninh Province. Captured documents indicated that a renewed PAVN/VC offensive was to start sometime after 5 August.

=== August ===
On 2 August, a patrol from the 3rd Brigade, 1st Infantry Division, killed 15 PAVN/VC in an ambush 10 miles (16 km) east-southeast of Lai Khê. A unit of the 1st Brigade, 9th Infantry Division, patrolling 5 miles (8.0 km) northeast of Cần Giuộc District, killed nine PAVN/VC and captured one individual weapon. Helicopter gunships from the air cavalry squadron of the 25th Infantry Division attacked two ammunition supply carts loaded with 30–40 122 mm rockets 7 miles (11 km) northeast of Dầu Tiếng, causing numerous secondary explosions. At 16:00, helicopter gunships from the 12th Combat Aviation Group killed 12 PAVN/VC on sampans 13 miles (21 km) northwest of Tân An.

On 3 August at 09:00, a unit of the 1st Brigade, 25th Infantry Division, captured five suspected VC 3 miles (4.8 km) northeast of Đức Hòa District and at 10:05, one of the captives lead the unit to a weapons cache containing seven 107 mm rockets and other munitions. Another Division unit found six 122 mm rockets 9 miles (14 km) northwest of Saigon. On 4 August units of the 1st and 3rd Brigades, 25th Infantry Division engaged an enemy force 4 miles (6.4 km) southwest of Cần Đước killing 52; U.S. losses were two killed. A UH-1 was shot down 6 miles (9.7 km) west-northwest of Cần Đước. On 6 August, another UH-1 was shot down 9 miles southeast of Phước Vĩnh.

On 7 August, in Long An Province, units of the 1st and 3rd Brigades, 9th Infantry Division, supported by helicopter gunships, killed 39 PAVN/VC and captured ten and 14 individual and two crew-served weapons; U.S. losses were eight killed. A company from the 3rd Brigade, 1st Infantry Division, found a weapons cache 3 miles (4.8 km) north of Cat Lai containing 49 RPG-2 grenades, 12 RPG-7 grenades and 51 mortar rounds. On 8 August, a unit of the 101st Airborne Division operating 4 miles (6.4 km) east-northeast of Trảng Bàng killed 11 PAVN/VC for the loss of two killed. On 9 August, a unit of the 25th Infantry Division, sweeping the scene of an airstrike 10 miles (16 km) west-northwest of Katum Camp, found 11 PAVN/VC dead among 20 destroyed bunkers. Helicopter gunships of the 1st Infantry Division engaged 30–40 PAVN/VC 2 miles (3.2 km) west of Thủ Đức, killing ten. Units of the 3rd Brigade, 1st Infantry Division, and the 11th ACR cordoned off Tru Thap village 5 miles (8.0 km) west of Bến Cát, while a unit of the ARVN 8th Regiment, 5th Division, engaged an enemy force killing 16 and capturing 37 suspected VC and seven individual and one crew-served weapons as well as food and munition.

On 10 August, in the Rung Sat Special Zone, the merchant ship S.S. Southport II received RPG fire on the Long Tau shipping channel 8 miles (13 km) southeast of Nhà Bè. U.S. helicopter gunships hit the firing area and ARVN forces swept the area finding 20 PAVN/VC dead. On 12 August, two companies from the 1st Brigade, 9th Infantry Division, engaged an enemy platoon 5 miles (8.0 km) south of Cần Giuộc, killing 33 and capturing eight, and seized eleven individual weapons. In other action 2 miles (3.2 km) west of Cần Giuộc another Division unit engaged an enemy force killing 104 and capturing 24; 31 individual and five crew-served weapons were also seized U.S. losses were 17 killed. At 21:15, a platoon from the 2nd Brigade, 25th Infantry Division, ambushed 25 PAVN/VC 2 miles southeast of Trảng Bàng killing ten and capturing two individual weapons.

At 09:30 on 13 August, a unit of the 11th ACR and an ARVN provisional reconnaissance unit engaged an enemy force 6 miles (9.7 km) north of Phu Loi killing ten and capturing 17 and three individual weapons. On 14 August, a company from the 1st Brigade, 9th Infantry Division found a rice cache 12 miles (19 km) southeast of Long Thành District. Units of the 2rd Brigade, 1st Infantry Division, 11th ACR and ARVN 5th Division cordoned and searched Cau Dat village 7 miles (11 km) southeast of Bến Cát killing two PAVN/VC and capturing two and finding a munitions cache containing over 72,000 rounds of 7.62×39 mm and assorted mortar and recoilless rifle munitions. On 15 August, the 11th ACR's Blackhorse Base Camp was hit by 20 107 mm rockets causing minimal damage.

On 18 August, the PAVN/VC began their Phase III Offensive, in III Corps—the major attacks were mounted against Tây Ninh and Lộc Ninh. A unit of the 1st Brigade, 25th Infantry Division found 16 107 mm rockets 12 miles (19 km) northwest of Saigon. At 01:15, Katum Camp was attacked by the VC 5th Sapper Battalion, who were beaten back losing 59 troops and 20 individual and seven crew-served weapons. A company from the 1st Brigade, 9th Infantry Division, was inserted into a hot landing zone 5 miles (8.0 km) south of Cần Giuộc, one UH-1 was shot down. Other brigade units reinforced and artillery, helicopter gunships and air support was provided, 66 PAVN/VC were killed and 25 captured and 29 individual and eight crew-served weapons; U.S. losses were three killed. At 16:30, five mortar rounds hit a Seabee motor pool 4 miles (6.4 km) southeast of Saigon. On 19 August, at 21:25, Katum Camp received 325 rounds of mortar fire followed by a ground probe. The enemy withdrew after 15 minutes with unknown losses. On 20 August, a CH-47 Chinook was shot down 13 miles (21 km) north-northeast of Tân An.

On 22 August, between 04:40 and 05:25, Saigon was hit by 20 122 mm rockets killing 14 civilians. Between 04:45 and 08:35, three merchant ships were attacked by fire in the Long Tau shipping channel causing minimal damage. The merchant ship S.S. Santa Monica was hit by a rocket while docked at Cat Lai 6 miles (9.7 km) east of Saigon causing minimal damage, U.S. helicopter gunships attacked the firing position. At 14:20, two 82 mm mortar rounds hit the Sông Bé hospital injuring 30 patients. On 23 August, an OH-6 was shot down 1 mile (1.6 km) northwest of An Lộc killing all four on board.

On 25 August at 22:30, Bien Hoa Air Base was hit by 15 107/122 mm rockets causing minimal damage. On 26 August, a UH-1 was shot down 13 miles (21 km) north-northeast of Tân An killing two on board. On 27 August, a unit of the 1st Brigade, 9th Infantry Division engaged an enemy unit 4 miles (6.4 km) southwest of Cần Giuộc killing 39 and capturing 17 individual and six crew-served weapons; U.S. losses were four killed. At 10:30, a company from the 3rd Brigade, 101st Airborne Division engaged an enemy unit 4 miles north of Trảng Bàng killing 103 and capturing 22 and 20 individual and four crew-served weapons; U.S. losses were 16 killed. At 23:55, three 107 mm rockets hit south of the Y Bridge in Saigon killing one civilian.

On 29 August, a unit of the air cavalry squadron of the 12th Combat Aviation Group attacked an enemy force 7 miles (11 km) northwest of Đức Hòa, killing 17 and capturing three. On 30 August, a company from the 3rd Brigade, 9th Infantry Division, engaged an enemy platoon 7 miles east of Tân An killing 12 and capturing two and three individual weapons. A unit of the 3rd Brigade, 9th Infantry Division, supported by helicopter gunships, engaged an enemy force 4 miles (6.4 km) southwest of Cần Giuộc killing ten and capturing one and three individual and one crew-served weapons. At 23:00 Bien Hoa Air Base was hit by 20 122 mm rockets causing minimal damage.

Cumulative operational results at the end of August were 5,180 PAVN/VC killed, 3,048 captured and 1,591 individual and 375 crew-served weapons captured. U.S. troopskilled577 killed.

=== September ===
On 1 September, between 01:00 and 03:00, the CIDG camp at Thien Ngon 19 miles (31 km) north-northwest of Tây Ninh was hit by rocket and mortar fire; AC-47s returned fire with unknown results. On 3 September, a mechanized infantry unit of the 2nd Brigade, 25th Infantry Division, was ambushed 12 miles (19 km) northeast of Tây Ninh, resulting in 19 PAVN/VC killed for U.S. losses of one killed. At 17:30, a unit of the 3rd Brigade, 9th Infantry Division, engaged an enemy force 4 miles (6.4 km) southwest of Cần Giuộc killing 14 and capturing one along with four individual and one crew-served weapons, and one radio; U.S. losses were one killed. A UH-1 was shot down 12 miles northeast of Tân An killing three. A USAF F-4 Phantom was shot down 22 miles (35 km) north-northwest of Tây Ninh and a UH-1 was shot down as it attempted to rescue the crew. On 4 September at 14:30 a company from the 1st Brigade, 9th Infantry Division patrolling 5 miles (8.0 km) west of Cần Giuộc engaged an enemy platoon killing 15 and capturing one as well as nine individual and one crew-served weapon.

On 5 September at 12:15, a unit of the U.S. 3rd Brigade, 101st Airborne Division air-assaulted into a hot landing zone 3 miles (4.8 km) east of Trảng Bàng and engaged an enemy force. Elements of the armored cavalry squadron of the 25th Infantry Division and other units from the Brigade maneuvered into blocking positions. Artillery, helicopter gunships and airstrikes were provided in support. By 16:00, additional units of the Brigade reinforced and took up blocking positions in an attempt to cordon the enemy force, then estimated at battalion size. Contact continued into the evening of the 5th and morning of the 6th when the ARVN 2nd Battalion, 49th Regiment, 25th Division, was inserted into the area. Sporadic action continued and contact was finally lost at 13:30 on the 6th when the enemy evaded the cordon. The total number off PAVN/VC killed in the 2-day battle was 103; U.S. losses were 31 killed. At 16:30, a unit of the 3rd Brigade, 9th Infantry Division, engaged an enemy force 4 miles (6.4 km) west of Cần Giuộc killing 27, and capturing nine and three individual weapons.

On 6 September at 23:30, a 122 mm rocket hit an area in the southwest of Saigon killing one civilian and destroying a house. On 7 September at 10:30, a unit of the 1st Brigade, 9th Infantry Division, supported by artillery and helicopter gunships engaged an entrenched enemy position 2 miles (3.2 km) northwest of Cần Giuộc killing 47, and capturing one and 11 individual weapons. A company from the 3rd Brigade, 101st Airborne Division air assaulted into a hot landing zone 6 miles (9.7 km) northeast of Trảng Bàng supported by helicopter gunships and air support. At 18:30, another company joined the action, which continued until the enemy withdrew at 10:30 on 8 September, leaving 35 dead, two captured, six AK-47s, six SKSs, one RPD machine gun, two 60 mm mortars and two 82 mm mortars; U.S. losses were 12 killed.

On 10 September at 11:00, a unit of the 1st Brigade, 9th Infantry Division, was air assaulted into an area 3 miles (4.8 km) north-northwest of Cần Giuộc where helicopter gunships had engaged ten PAVN/VC earlier. The infantry engaged an enemy force and were reinforced by other Brigade units and units of the 3rd Brigade. The enemy withdrew after dark leaving 48 dead and three captured and 18 individual weapons; U.S. losses were two killed. On 11 September at 04:30, a mechanized infantry element of the 2nd Brigade, 25th Infantry Division, occupying night-defensive positions 3 miles west-southwest of Dầu Tiếng, received mortar and small arms fire followed by a ground attack. Another unit of the Brigade reinforced it and contact was lost at 07:10 when the enemy withdrew, leaving 99 dead and one captured along with 18 AK-47s, five RPDs, two RPG launchers, two pistols and a radio. U.S. losses were three killed. At 13:00 a unit of the 1st Brigade, 9th Infantry Division, supported by helicopter gunships, engaged an enemy force 2 miles (3.2 km) north of Bến Lức killing 12 and capturing one who led the unit to a weapons cache containing 90 AK-47s.

On 15 September at 11:10, a company from the 1st Brigade, 9th Infantry Division, engaged an enemy force 4 miles (6.4 km) northeast of Cần Giuộc. Three more companies were inserted into the area and artillery, helicopter gunship and air support was provided. The enemy withdrew, leaving 20 dead and one captured as well as nine individual and one crew-served weapons; U.S. losses were four killed. At 11:45, a unit of the 3rd Brigade, 25th infantry Division, patrolling 1 mile (1.6 km) northeast of Hóc Môn found a munitions cache containing 18 122 mm rockets and 30 RPG-2 grenades.

On 16 September at 01:30, a mechanized company from the 2nd Brigade, 25th Infantry Division, was attacked 11 miles (18 km) southeast of Tây Ninh. The unit was supported by artillery and helicopter gunships and the enemy withdrew leaving 42 killed, one captured, and 11 individual and eight crew-served weapons; U.S. losses were two killed. At 10:40, a unit of the 3rd Brigade, 101st Airborne Division, engaged an enemy force 4 miles (6.4 km) northeast of Trảng Bàng. The enemy withdrew after 35 minutes but the unit pursued and reengaged, killing a total of 28. At 12:45, a 25th Infantry Division convoy on Highway 26 was attacked 9 miles (14 km) east-southeast of Tây Ninh. Artillery and helicopter gunship support was provided and the enemy withdrew leaving 26 dead; U.S. losses were seven killed. At 23:00, a 25th Infantry Division firebase 9 miles northeast of Go Dau Ha received mortar fire followed by a ground attack. The defenders returned the fire, supported by artillery, and the enemy withdrew at 06:30. A unit of the 101st Airborne Division swept the area finding 131 PAVN/VC dead and four captured and seven individual and five crew-served weapons; U.S. losses were four killed.

On 17 September at 02:00, a mechanized unit from the 2nd Brigade, 25th Infantry Division, in a night-defensive position 2 miles (3.2 km) southwest of Dầu Tiếng, was attacked. The attack was repulsed with artillery and helicopter gunship support, killing 49 PAVN/VC, and capturing 11 individual and nine crew-served weapons. At 09:45, a company from the 3rd Brigade, 25th Infantry Division patrolling 4 miles (6.4 km) southwest of Phú Cường found a munitions cache containing 99 RPG-2 grenades, 110 RPG-7 grenades, and 13,000 rounds of 7.62×39mm and other assorted munitions. At midday, a company from the 1st Brigade, 25th Infantry Division, engaged an enemy force 7 miles (11 km) southeast of Tây Ninh resulting in 11 PAVN/VC killed; U.S. losses were one killed.

On 19 September at 13:20, a company from the 3rd Brigade, 101st Airborne Division, engaged an enemy force 3 miles (4.8 km) northeast of Trảng Bàng, the enemy withdrew at 17:50, leaving 17 dead; U.S. losses were two killed. At 15:25, a company from the 3rd Brigade, 25th Infantry Division operating 17 miles (27 km) northeast of Tây Ninh was attacked by an enemy force. The enemy withdrew at 20:10, leaving 15 dead; U.S. losses were three killed. On 20 September at 01:00, a company from the 2nd Brigade, 25th Infantry Division, in a night-defensive position 4 miles (6.4 km) west of Dầu Tiếng was attacked, the unit returned fire and were supported by artillery, airstrikes and an AC-47. The enemy withdrew at 03:00, leaving 37 dead and one captured as well as 14 individual and three crew-served weapons, 30 RPG grenades and 6,500 rounds of small arms ammunition. At 10:45, a company from the 1st Brigade, 25th Infantry Division engaged an enemy platoon 7 miles (11 km) southeast of Tây Ninh killing 19 and capturing two.

On 22 September at 03:40 a unit of the cavalry squadron of the 25th Infantry Division in a night-defensive position 2 miles (3.2 km) northwest of Củ Chi was attacked. The unit returned fire supported by artillery, helicopter gunships and an AC-47, the enemy withdrew at 04:30, leaving 19 dead; U.S. losses were two killed. On 24 September at 02:20 ten rockets hit the Nhà Bè tank farm causing minimal damage. Artillery and helicopter gunship fire was directed onto the firing location with unknown results. At 11:15, a unit of the 1st Brigade, 9th Infantry Division air-assaulted into an area 9 miles (14 km) northeast of Tân An and engaged an enemy company. The unit was reinforced by another brigade unit and supported by artillery, helicopter gunship and airstrikes. The battle continued until the next morning when the enemy withdrew, leaving 39 dead and two captured, and nine individual and one crew-served weapon; U.S. losses were one killed.

On 25 September at 11:45 a unit of the 11th ACR, a reconnaissance unit of the 1st Brigade, 1st Infantry Division, and a unit of the ARVN 8th Regiment, 5th Division, found 95 bunkers 13 miles (21 km) east of Bến Cát containing a weapons cache. At 14:00, a unit of the 199th LIB and RF forces patrolling 8 miles (13 km) north-northeast of Tân An found a weapons cache containing 21 107 mm rockets. USAF F-100s from the 35th Tactical Fighter Wing attacked an base camp 20 miles (32 km) southeast of Biên Hòa destroying ten structures. On 26 September, a patrol from the 1st Brigade, 25th Infantry Division ambushed an enemy force 1 mile (1.6 km) southwest of Củ Chi killing ten.

On 27 September at 11:30, a company from the 11th ACR found a tunnel complex 10 miles (16 km) southeast of Bến Cát containing a weapons cache that included two RPG launchers, two M1911 pistols and 351 82 mm mortar rounds. On 28 September at midnight, three 122 mm rockets hit the south of Saigon. At 16:00, a unit of the 199th LIB operating 3 miles (4.8 km) northwest of Bến Lức, found a weapons cache in 55 gallon drums buried in a riverbank, the cache included two AK-47s and one RPG-2 launcher. On 30 September at 15:00, helicopter gunships from the 12th Combat Aviation Group attacked an enemy force, crossing a stream 6 miles (9.7 km) southwest of Cần Đước killing ten. At 23:35, Long Binh Post received 40 82 mm mortar rounds, causing minimal damage.

Cumulative operational results at the end of September were 7,144 PAVN/VC killed, 3,578 captured with 2,233 individual and 515 crew-served weapons captured. U.S. losses were 765 killed.

=== October ===
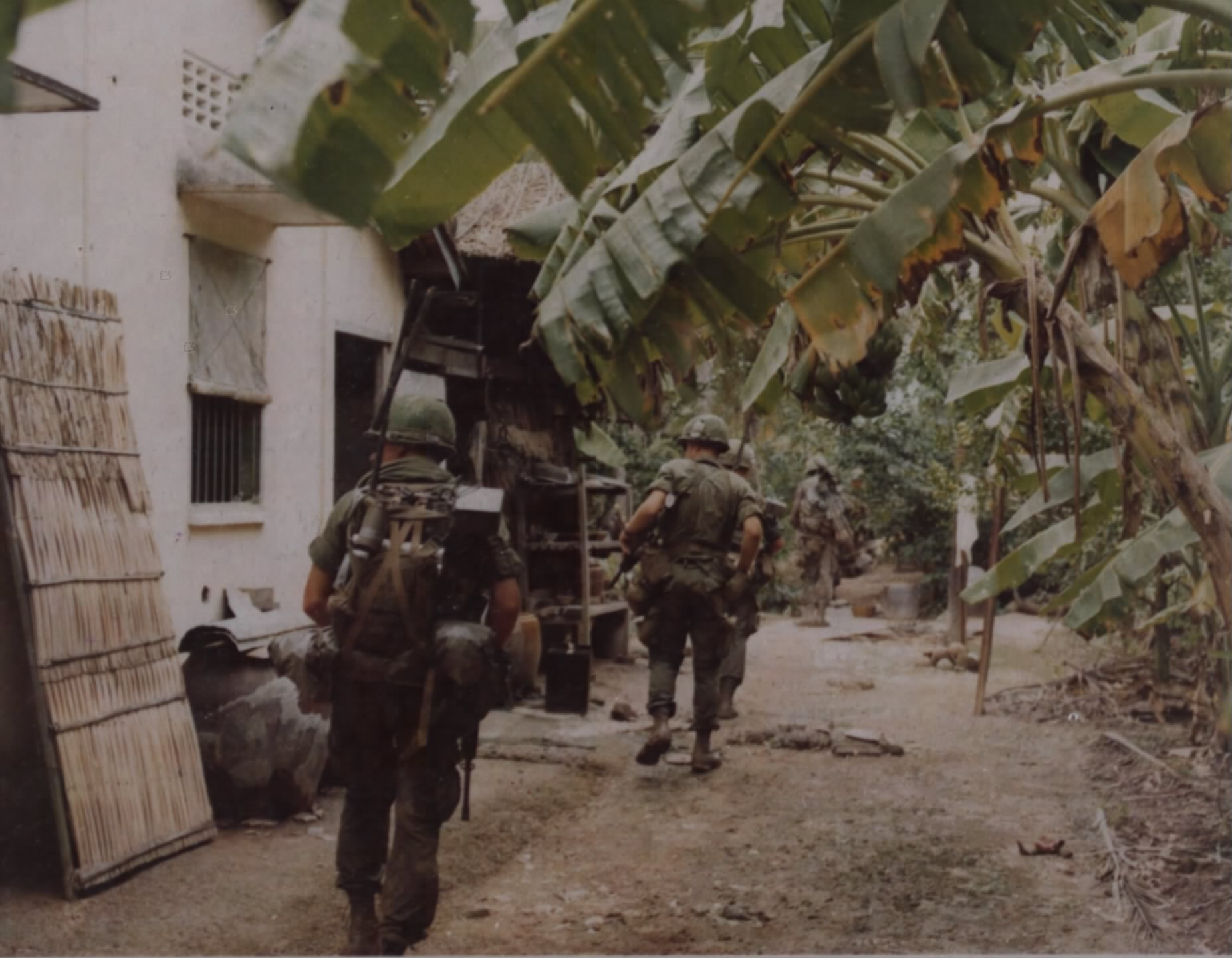
Company D, 4th Battalion, 12th Infantry patrol, 2 October 1968

On 1 October at 14:20, a unit of the 3rd Brigade, 25th Infantry Division, engaged an enemy force 8 miles (13 km) northwest of Dầu Tiếng supported by artillery and helicopter gunships. The enemy withdrew at 18:15 leaving 14 dead and three captured, and three individual weapons and assorted munitions. On 20 October at 03:45, a firebase of the 1st Brigade, 25th Infantry Division, 3 miles (4.8 km) north of Đức Hòa was attacked by fire, the defenders returned fire supported by artillery and helicopter gunships and the enemy withdrew after one hour leaving 13 dead, and eight individual and two crew-served weapons. On 3 October at 23:40, three 107 mm rockets hit the Nhà Bè tank farm causing minimal damage, artillery and helicopter gunship fire was directed onto the firing location with unknown results. A UH-1 was shot down 18 miles (29 km) northwest of Tây Ninh killing four on board.

On 5 October at 18:00, a UH-1 was shot down 0.5 miles (0.80 km) south of Tây Ninh killing one on board. On 6 October at 09:00, a unit of the cavalry squadron of the 1st Infantry Division engaged an enemy force 2 miles (3.2 km) southwest of An Lộc. The enemy broke contact at 11:40 but another unit of the squadron engaged the enemy until they withdrew at 16:45, leaving 43 dead, and 13 individual and four crew-served weapons; U.S. losses were one killed. At 11:15, a unit of the 1st Brigade, 1st Infantry Division, found a weapons cache 11 miles (18 km) northeast of Biên Hòa containing two light machine guns, 32 individual weapons, 45 82 mm mortar rounds and over 5,000 rounds of 7.62×39 mm munitions. At 13:00, a unit of the 1st Brigade, 9th Infantry Division, engaged an enemy force 4 miles (6.4 km) south of Bến Lức, supported by artillery and helicopter gunships, killing 12 and capturing two individual weapons.

On 7 October at 07:45, a company from the 3rd Brigade, 1st Infantry Division, patrolling in Bình Dương Province, found a base complex and weapons cache containing over 1,000 anti-personnel mines, 1,050 grenades, 19 individual weapons and 87 RPG grenades. At 08:50, two companies from the 3rd Brigade, 25th infantry Division, operating 5 miles (8.0 km) east-northeast of Trảng Bàng engaged a unit of the PAVN 101st Regiment. The unit was supported by artillery and helicopter gunships and the battle continued until the early morning, resulting in 147 PAVN killed, seven captured and three individual and one crew-served weapons captured; U.S. losses were eight killed. On 8 October, an OH-6 was shot down 4 miles (6.4 km) northwest of Tân An.

On 10 October at 08:20, a unit of the 3rd Brigade, 25th Infantry Division, engaged an enemy battalion 2 miles (3.2 km) northeast of Trảng Bàng. Units of the 1st and 3rd Brigades reinforced and artillery, helicopter gunships and airstrikes were provided in support. The enemy withdrew leaving 26 dead, one AK-47, one 60 mm mortar and two 82 mm mortars; U.S. losses were six killed. At 10:30, a Chieu Hoi led a unit of the 1st Brigade, 25th Infantry Division, to two weapons caches 7 miles (11 km) east of Trảng Bàng containing 53 individual weapons, 450 grenades, 300 60/82 mm mortar rounds and 8,000 rounds of 7.62×39 mm. At 13:00, a unit from the 3rd Brigade, 82nd Airborne Division, found two weapons caches 9 miles (14 km) west-northwest of Saigon containing one light machine gun, two radios, 74 RPG-2 grenades and 17,000 rounds of 7.62×39 mm. An OH-6 was shot down 14 miles (23 km) northeast of Bến Cát.

On 11 October at 12:20, a unit of the 1st Brigade, 9th Infantry Division, killed six PAVN/VC and captured one 3 miles (4.8 km) north of Cần Đước. At 13:00, helicopter gunships supporting the unit killed a further ten PAVN/VC as they attempted to escape 1 mile (1.6 km) to the northwest. Shortly afterwards, another Brigade unit engaged enemy forces 4 miles (6.4 km) north of Cần Đước killing a further 25; U.S. losses were five killed. On 12 October at 16:30, the aerorifle platoon from the 25th Infantry Division was led by a Chieu Hoi to a weapons cache 4 miles northwest of Bao Trai, which contained over 10,000 rounds of 7.62×39 mm, 50 82 mm mortar rounds and 100 grenades.

On 15 October at 13:45, a unit of the 2nd Brigade, 1st Infantry Division, found a weapons cache 12 miles (19 km) north-northeast of Biên Hòa containing 130 individual weapons and two light machine guns. On 17 October at 13:30, a company from the 3rd Brigade, 9th Infantry Division, operating 9 miles (14 km) north of Tân An found a weapons cache containing seven AK-47s and 20 other rifles. On 19 October at 02:15, two U.S. Navy PBRs attacked an enemy sampan 9 miles (14 km) north-northwest of Vũng Tàu causing it to explode, killing 15 PAVN/VC. While searching the wreckage the PBRs received fire from the riverbanks and responded in kind.

On 25 October at 14:30, a unit of the 3rd Brigade, 25th Infantry Division, operating 5 miles (8.0 km) east of Go Dau Ha engaged an enemy force. The unit was joined by another brigade unit and RF forces, who attempted to establish a cordon around the enemy position. However, by 19:25 the enemy withdrew leaving 16 dead and one captured as well as two individual and one crew-served weapons. On 26 October at 06:00, a unit of the 1st Brigade, 1st infantry Division, in a night defensive position 11 miles (18 km) east of Katum, received mortar fire followed by a ground attack. The defenders returned fire, supported by artillery and airstrikes, and the enemy withdrew in the early afternoon leaving 80 dead and 26 individual and six crew-served weapons; U.S. losses were eight killed. A sweep of the area on 27 October found a further 23 PAVN dead and one more U.S. soldier killed. At 19:30, an artillery battery of the 1st Infantry Division fired on a suspected enemy position 7 miles (11 km) east of Katum, causing 128 secondary explosions. At 23:30, ten 107 mm rockets hit Bien Hoa Air Base causing minimal damage.

On 27 October at 08:40, a unit of the 1st Brigade, 25th Infantry Division, found a munitions cache 4 miles (6.4 km) northeast of Duc Hoa containing six 107 mm rockets, 176 RPG-7 grenades, 96 RPG-2 grenades, and 29 120 mm mortar rounds. At 11:15, helicopter gunships of the 9th Infantry Division attacked an enemy force 6 miles (9.7 km) east of Cần Giuộc, following this a unit of the 1st Brigade was landed in the area and engaged an enemy force. The enemy withdrew at 13:30, leaving 31 dead and two captured, and three individual and two crew-served weapons. On 28 October at 11:30, helicopter gunships engaged an enemy force 7 miles (11 km) northeast of Trảng Bàng. A company from the 1st Brigade, 25th Infantry Division, was landed in the area and engaged them until they withdrew at 13:00, leaving 11 dead; U.S. losses were one killed. At 13:45, two companies from the 2nd Brigade, 25th Infantry Division, found a munitions cache 1 mile (1.6 km) southwest of Dầu Tiếng containing 53,000 rounds of 7.62×39 mm and 3,500 rounds of 12.7 mm munitions. At 15:00, helicopter gunships from the 12th Combat Aviation Group engaged an enemy platoon 7 miles east of Dầu Tiếng killing 18. On 30 October at 14:00, a unit of the 3rd Brigade, 25th Infantry Division, conducted a post-airstrike sweep of a bunker complex 7 miles (11 km) southeast of Dầu Tiếng finding seven PAVN/VC dead, and 13 individual and one crew-served weapons. On 31 October at 10:30, a unit of the 1st Brigade, 1st Infantry Division, engaged an enemy platoon in fortified positions 8 miles (13 km) east of Katum, supported by artillery, helicopter gunships and airstrikes. The enemy withdrew at 15:30 leaving 42 dead. At 21:30 eight 107/122 mm rockets hit Saigon killing two civilians.

Cumulative operational results at the end of October were 9,277 PAVN/VC killed, 5,110 captured and 2,474 individual and 608 crew-served weapons captured. U.S. losses were 942 killed.

=== November ===
On 1 November at 01:20, five 107/122 mm rockets were fired at Tan Son Nhut Air Base causing minimal damage. At 03:30, five mortar/rocket rounds hit the Nhà Bè tank farm causing minimal damage. At 03:45, Firebase Rita of the 1st Brigade, 1st Infantry Division, was attacked by a PAVN force, followed by mortar/rocket fire and then another ground attack at 06:55. The defenders returned fire – supported by artillery, helicopter gunships and airstrikes – and the PAVN withdrew leaving 27 dead; U.S. losses were 12 killed. Lieutenant colonel Charles Calvin Rogers would be awarded the Medal of Honor for his defense of the base. At 06:30, three rockets hit Saigon killing 19 civilians.

On 3 November at 15:45, a Chieu Hoi led a unit of the 2nd Brigade, 25th Infantry Division, to a munitions cache 4 miles (6.4 km) north of Đức Hòa containing 247 RPG-7 grenades. On 4 November, between 20:20 and 21:05, helicopters from the 12th Combat Aviation Group sank six sampans 6 miles (9.7 km) southeast of Cần Giuộc, killing 17 PAVN/VC. Three UH-1s were shot down in Bình Dương and Hậu Nghĩa Provinces with one U.S. soldier killed. On 5 November at 14:45, a company from the 3rd Brigade (25th Infantry Division) operating 4 miles east of Dầu Tiếng, engaged an entrenched enemy force, killing seven. At 12:30, the S.S. President Jefferson received RPG and small arms fire on the Nhà Bè causing minimal damage, PBRs and helicopter gunships attacked the firing positions with unknown results.

On 6 November at 20:00, 20 82 mm mortar rounds hit Bến Cát. At 21:30, a 107 mm rocket hit Nhà Bè killing one civilian. A helicopter was shot down 3 miles (4.8 km) southwest of Phước Bình and another 17 miles (27 km) north-northeast of Biên Hòa. On 8 November at 14:35, a unit of the 11th ACR engaged an enemy force 4 miles (6.4 km) southwest of An Lộc, supported by artillery and helicopter gunships, killing 17 PAVN/VC. At 15:00, a mechanized unit of the 3rd Brigade (25th Infantry Division) operating with RF troops, engaged an enemy force 17 miles (27 km) southeast of Tây Ninh. The enemy withdrew leaving 15 dead; U.S. losses were four killed.

On 9 November, it was announced that the 1st Cavalry Division had started redeploying to III Corps from I Corps and would be based at Phước Vĩnh Base Camp and would join the operation. On 10 November, a unit of the 11th ACR engaged an enemy force 6 miles (9.7 km) southwest of An Lộc; the enemy withdrew at 17:15 leaving 38 dead, and one individual and three crew-served weapons. U.S. losses were one killed. At 14:00, helicopter gunships from the 12th Combat Aviation Group engaged 100 PAVN/VC moving 9 miles (14 km) east-southeast of Tây Ninh and were later joined by F-100 jets, killing 11 PAVN/VC. At 20:15, a unit from the 2nd Brigade, 1st Infantry Division, ambushed ten PAVN/VC 9 miles northeast of Saigon; the enemy withdrew after 25 minutes leaving six dead and five individual weapons. A UH-1 was shot down 7 miles (11 km) southwest of Cần Giuộc.

On 11 November at 11:30, a unit of the 11th ACR engaged an enemy force 4 miles (6.4 km) west-southwest of An Lộc; the unit was later reinforced by a unit of the 1st Infantry Division. The enemy withdrew at 15:40, leaving 28 dead and one individual and three crew-served weapons; U.S. losses were one killed. A UH-1 was shot down 28 miles (45 km) northwest of Tây Ninh. On 12 November, a unit of the 11th ACR operating 3 miles (4.8 km) west-southwest of An Lộc engaged an enemy force; the unit was reinforced by two companies from the 3rd Brigade, 1st Cavalry Division. The enemy withdrew at 17:30, leaving 16 dead and three individual weapons. On 13 November at 09:40, the S.S. Fred Morris received RPG fire on the Long Tau shipping channel causing minimal damage. PBRs and helicopter gunships attacked the firing positions with unknown results. At 10:30, helicopter gunships from the 12th Combat Aviation Group engaged 30–40 PAVN/VC 2 miles (3.2 km) east-southeast of Hiệp Hòa. A later sweep of the area by a unit of the 2nd Brigade, 25th Infantry Division, found 16 dead and six individual weapons. At 13:30, a company from the 3rd Brigade, 1st Cavalry Division, was attacked 4 miles west of An Lộc. The unit returned fire, supported by helicopter gunships and airstrikes, killing 12 PAVNVC; U.S. losses were two killed. At 17:15, aeroscouts of the 1st Brigade, 1st Cavalry Division, engaged 40–50 PAVN/VC supported by artillery, killing 38. A USAF F-4 Phantom was shot down 26 miles (42 km) north of Tây Ninh.

On 14 November at 13:30, a unit of the 2nd Brigade, 25th Infantry Division, found a 10-ton rice cache 7 miles (11 km) northwest of Phú Cường. An OH-6 was shot down 4 miles (6.4 km) east-southeast of Phước Bình killing all three on board. An O-1 Bird Dog was shot down 12 miles (19 km) southwest of Đồng Xoài, killing the pilot. On 15 November at 08:30, helicopter gunships from the armored cavalry squadron of the 1st Infantry Division engaged an enemy force 5 miles (8.0 km) west of Bến Cát and also called in artillery fire on the area. Air cavalry troops from the squadron were landed and found 18 PAVN/VC dead, and one individual weapon and five tons of rice.

On 16 November at 06:30, a unit of the 3rd Brigade, 1st Cavalry Division, in a night-defensive position 24 miles (39 km) north-northwest of Tây Ninh was attacked. The unit returned fire supported by artillery, helicopter gunships and airstrikes; the enemy withdrew at 08:00 but the unit pursued and reestablished contact and action continued until the enemy withdrew at 15:30, leaving 15 dead as well as three individual and one crew-served weapons. Further sweeps of the area over the next two days brought total enemy losses to 44 killed, and 19 individual and six crew-served weapons. At 07:50, a unit of the 3rd Brigade, 1st Infantry Division, found a munitions cache 10 miles (16 km) southwest of Đồng Xoài containing 900 82 mm mortar rounds and 960 grenades. At 09:00, helicopter gunships from the 1st Squadron, 9th Cavalry Regiment, killed ten PAVN/VC transporting weapons 31 miles (50 km) north-northeast of Tây Ninh. At 16:50, helicopter gunships from the 12th Combat Aviation Group attacked 20 PAVN/VC 4 miles (6.4 km) southwest of Củ Chi, killing 15. An OH-6 was shot down 4 miles east-southeast of Trảng Bàng, killing three.

On 17 September at 10:20, aeroscouts from the 1/9th Cavalry operating 6 miles (9.7 km) east of Sông Bé called in airstrikes on a bunker complex, killing five. Later, in the same area, helicopter gunships from the 1/9th Cavalry killed six PAVN/VC. On 20 November at 03:40, a unit of the 3rd Brigade, 1st Infantry Division, in a night defensive position 6 miles (9.7 km) east of Bến Cát, received mortar fire followed by a ground attack. The unit returned fire—supported by artillery, helicopter gunships and an AC-47. The enemy withdrew at 06:45, leaving 12 dead, one captured, and 12 individual and one crew-served weapons; U.S. losses were one killed. A UH-1 was shot down 6 miles northwest of Katum killing one on board.

On 21 November at 10:30, an OH-6 was shot down 22 miles (35 km) northeast of Tây Ninh. At 11:30, a unit of the 3rd Brigade, 25th Infantry Division, found a munitions cache 11 miles (18 km) west-northwest of Bến Cát containing 207 RPG-7 grenades and 27 RPG-2 grenades. At 14:00, a unit of the 1st Brigade, 1st Cavalry Division found 22 PAVN/VC graves 4 miles (6.4 km) north of Phước Bình, all had been killed in the preceding two days. On 22 November at 11:30, a unit of the 199th LIB found a weapons cache in a tunnel 26 miles (42 km) northeast of Bà Rịa, containing one 57 mm recoilless rifle, two 82 mm mortars, a 12.7 mm machine gun, 14 light machine guns, 82 individual weapons, 20 crew-served weapons, 15 RPG-2 grenades and 29 antitank mines. At 13:15, a unit of the 3rd Brigade, 9th Infantry Division, engaged an enemy platoon 9 miles (14 km) east-southeast of Tân An; the enemy withdrew after 90 minutes, leaving 16 dead and one individual weapon. At 20:20, 25 PAVN/VC with oxcarts were engaged by a reconnaissance platoon (from the 25th Infantry Division) that directed artillery and airstrikes onto the area 10 miles (16 km) north of Củ Chi. The PAVN/VC fighters withdrew after 15 minutes, leaving ten dead. An OV-1 Mohawk was shot down 4 miles east of Tây Ninh and at 14:55 another OV-1 was downed 21 miles (34 km) northwest of Tây Ninh.

On 23 November at 09:15, a company from the 3rd Brigade, 25th Infantry Division, was ambushed by an entrenched enemy force 8 miles (13 km) north-northwest of Go Dau Ha. The U.S. force was supported by artillery, helicopter gunships an airstrikes and an RF unit and another brigade unit arrived to reinforce. The enemy withdrew at 16:10, leaving six dead, and six individual and one crew-served weapons; U.S. losses were fifteen killed. At 13:00, a company from the 1st Brigade, 1st Cavalry Division, engaged an enemy company 9 miles (14 km) southeast of Katum; the enemy withdrew at 19:30, leaving 12 dead and one individual weapon. At 14:00, a unit of the 199th LIB found another weapons cache 25 miles (40 km) northeast of Bà Rịa, containing 28 automatic rifles, 19 bolt-action rifles and 14 submachine guns. At 15:15, helicopter gunships from the 1/9th Cavalry attacked an enemy force 5 miles (8.0 km) northeast of Lộc Ninh killing 19. At 16:15, helicopter gunships supporting the 2nd Brigade, 25th Infantry Division, attacked an enemy force 4 miles (6.4 km) northeast of Trảng Bàng and also directed airstrikes onto the area. A company from the brigade was landed in the area and found 10 PAVN/VC dead and captured eight and six individual and one crew-served weapons.

On 24 November at 11:30, helicopter gunships of the 12th Combat Aviation Group, operating 15 miles (24 km) northwest of Tây Ninh, engaged 200 PAVN/VC. The enemy withdrew after three hours, leaving 54 dead. On 25 November at 06:30, a unit of the 3rd Brigade, 1st Cavalry Division, engaged an enemy company 21 miles (34 km) north-northwest of Tây Ninh supported by artillery, helicopter gunships and airstrikes, the enemy withdrew at 10:30, leaving 52 dead, and 20 individual and 17 crew-served weapons. The next day, during a sweep of the area, a further 71 bodies were found, and on 28 November, helicopters from the 1/9th Cavalry located a further 15 bodies bringing the cumulative total to 138 killed, six captured and 40 weapons captured; U.S. losses were five killed. At 17:00, a unit of the 2nd Brigade, 1st Cavalry Division operating 6 miles (9.7 km) southwest of Katum was attacked and returned fire supported by artillery, helicopter gunships and airstrikes. The enemy withdrew at 17:30, leaving 22 dead and two individual and one crew-served weapons. A UH-1 was shot down 11 miles (18 km) north of Biên Hòa killing one on board.

On 26 November at 05:00, a company from the 2nd Brigade, 25th Infantry Division, in a night-defensive position 9 miles (14 km) southwest of Go Dau Ha, was attacked by an enemy company. The enemy withdrew after an hour leaving ten dead; U.S. losses were two killed. On 27 November at 08:50, RF units supported by artillery and airstrikes engaged an enemy battalion 9 miles west-southwest of Go Dau Ha. In the afternoon, further RF units and a unit of the 1st Brigade, 25th Infantry, provided reinforcements, with fighting continuing into the night. PAVN/VC losses were 96 killed, and ten individual and two crew-served weapons captured. At 11:10, a unit of the 1st Brigade, 1st Cavalry Division and a unit of the 11th ACR engaged a PAVN company 4 miles (6.4 km) north of Lộc Ninh. The enemy withdrew at 16:30, leaving 58 dead, and 13 individual and nine crew-served weapons. At midday, a UH-1 was shot down 12 miles (19 km) southeast of Tây Ninh killing three on board. At 13:30 a reconnaissance team from the 1st Cavalry Division was landed 8 miles (13 km) southeast of Sông Bé and was immediately engaged by an enemy force, the team was immediately extracted, supported by artillery, helicopter gunships and airstrikes, with the enemy losing 14 troops. At 13:50, a unit of the 3rd Brigade, 25th Infantry Division, was air-assaulted into an area 8 miles southeast of Tây Ninh and immediately engaged by an enemy force. Two UH-1s were shot down in the landing zone. Reinforcements arrived and the enemy withdrew at 20:40, leaving one dead; U.S. losses were 15 killed.

On 28 November at 01:30, a unit of the 2nd Brigade, 25th Infantry Division, in night-defensive positions 6 miles (9.7 km) south-southwest of Go Dau Ha, received mortar fire followed by a ground attack. The enemy withdrew an hour later leaving 37 dead, one captured, and nine individual and six crew-served weapons; U.S. losses were three killed. At 09:00, mechanized infantry from the 3rd Brigade, 1st Cavalry Division, and infantry from the ARVN 9th Regiment, 5th Division, engaged an enemy force 4 miles (6.4 km) north-northeast of Lộc Ninh supported by artillery and helicopter gunships. Contact was lost at 10:30, but then reestablished at 13:15, and the fighting continued until 16:30, when the enemy withdrew leaving 71 dead. At 18:00, helicopter gunships of the 1/9th Cavalry operating 31 miles (50 km) northeast of Tây Ninh attacked an enemy force, supported by airstrikes, resulting in three secondary explosions and 25 PAVN/VC killed.

On 29 November at 11:10, mechanized infantry from the 1st Infantry Division engaged a PAVN battalion 5 miles (8.0 km) northeast of Lộc Ninh, supported by artillery, helicopter gunships and airstrikes. The PAVN withdrew at 15:30, leaving 78 dead; U.S. losses were seven killed. At 16:00 a unit of the 1st Brigade, 25th Infantry Division, found the bodies of 21 PAVN/VC 9 miles (14 km) northwest of Go Dau Ha that had apparently been killed two days earlier. On 30 November, a UH-1 was shot down 12 miles (19 km) north-northwest of Phú Cường.

Cumulative operational results at the end of November were 11,856 PAVN/VC killed, 6,320 captured, and 3,228 individual and 748 crew-served weapons captured. U.S. losses were 1,205 killed.

=== December ===
On 1 December at 13:40, a unit of the 2nd Brigade, 25th Infantry Division, found a munitions cache 8 miles (13 km) southwest of Bến Cát containing 128 82 mm mortar round, 70 RPG-2 grenades and 30 RPG-7 grenades. At 13:45, helicopter gunships from the 1/9th Cavalry attacked an enemy force 8 miles (13 km) south of Phước Vĩnh. Air cavalry troops were landed in the area and engaged an enemy force at 16:00, supported by a unit of the 1st Infantry Division. The enemy withdrew after an hour leaving 24 dead; U.S. losses were one killed. On 2 December at 08:30, a company from the 2nd Brigade, 25th Infantry Division, patrolling 5 miles (8.0 km) west of Đức Hòa engaged an enemy force. The enemy withdrew after 30 minutes leaving nine dead, two captured, and three individual weapons and four radios. At 09:30, RF forces engaged an enemy force 3 miles (4.8 km) northwest of Cần Đước; the unit was supported by helicopter gunships and reinforced by a unit of the 3rd Brigade, 9th Infantry Division. The enemy withdrew leaving 14 killed, 17 captured and eight individual weapons. An aerorifle platoon from the 11th ACR conducting a bomb damage assessment 11 miles (18 km) east of Lai Khê found 11 PAVN/VC dead as well as seven individual and two crew-served weapons, and two radios. At 10:10, a unit of the 199th LIB was led to a munitions cache 3 miles (4.8 km) north of Bến Lức containing 96 RPG-2 grenades and 28 RPG-7 grenades. A UH-1 was shot down 8 miles (13 km) east of Katum.

On 3 December at 10:25, a unit of the 3rd Brigade, 1st Cavalry Division was air assaulted into an area 15 miles (24 km) west-southwest of Phước Bình and 20 minutes after landing were attacked by an enemy force. Supporting fire was called in and the battle continued until 15:00, when the enemy withdrew leaving one dead; U.S. losses were 25 killed. At 10:45, an aerial observer spotted four sampans with 12 PAVN/VC on board 10 miles (16 km) west of Tây Ninh and called in artillery fire that destroyed all four sampans and killed ten PAVN/VC. A UH-1 was shot down 12 miles (19 km) south-southeast of Đồng Xoài. On 4 December at 02:45, a unit of the 2nd Brigade, 1st Cavalry Division, in a night-defensive position 12 miles (19 km) southeast of Katum received 75–100 82 mm mortar rounds followed by a ground assault. The unit was supported by artillery and helicopter gunships, and the enemy withdrew at 05:15, leaving 37 dead along with nine individual and two crew-served weapons. At 14:30, a company from the 3rd Brigade, 1st Cavalry Division, patrolling 9 miles (14 km) west-northwest of Sông Bé found a munitions cache containing 600 60/82 mm mortar and 100 75 mm recoilless rifle rounds. At 15:10, a unit of the 3rd Brigade, 1st Cavalry Division sweeping the area 15 miles west-southwest of Phước Bình, was attacked by an enemy force; the enemy withdrew after 50 minutes. A UH-1 was shot down 7 miles (11 km) west of An Lộc killing six on board.

On 5 December at 08:15, an OH-6 was shot down 6 miles (9.7 km) west of Đồng Xoài, killing two on board. At 13:30, a unit of the 2nd Brigade, 25th Infantry Division found a weapons cache 6 miles (9.7 km) north of Hiệp Hòa containing 35 carbines. At 15:45, a company from the 3rd Brigade, 82nd Airborne Division patrolling 7 miles (11 km) northwest of Saigon, found 15 107 mm rockets. At 22:15, a U.S. Army position near Bien Hoa Air Base received 25 82 mm mortar rounds causing minimal damage. On 6 December – between midnight and 02:15 – numerous U.S., ARVN and South Vietnamese Government installations in and around An Lộc received mortar and rocket fire that caused minimal damage. Between 01:00 and 02:15, mortar/rocket attacks on Tây Ninh also caused minimal damage. At 09:15, mechanized infantry from the 2nd Brigade, 25th Infantry Division, found a munitions cache 5 miles (8.0 km) east of Trảng Bàng containing 127 82 mm mortar rounds, 110 RPG-2 grenades, 30 RPG-7 grenades and 8,500 rounds of small arms ammunition. At 12:30, a unit of the 3rd Brigade, 9th Infantry Division, found a weapons cache 3 miles (4.8 km) northwest of Cần Đước containing 15 AK-47s.

On 7 December at 11:10, helicopter gunships from the 12th Combat Aviation Group attacked an enemy force 12 miles (19 km) north-northwest of Tân An killing 18. At 16:30, a landing zone 8 miles (13 km) southwest of An Lộc, occupied by a unit of the 1st Cavalry Division and CIDG forces, received 100 82 mm mortar rounds, causing minimal damage. At 17:30, a company from the 1st Brigade, 1st Cavalry Division, found a bunker complex, following a B-52 strike 6 miles (9.7 km) northwest of Đồng Xoài, containing a supply cache that included 4 tons of rice, 876 RPG-2 grenades, 85 RPG-7 grenades and 58,000 rounds of small arms ammunition. At 18:45, a reconnaissance patrol of the 9th Infantry Division engaged an enemy unit 8 miles (13 km) north-northwest of Tân An; after 45 minutes the patrol was extracted having killed 10 PAVN/VC.

On 8 December at 12:10, a company from the 3rd Brigade, 9th Infantry Division, found a munitions cache 12 miles (19 km) northwest of Tân An containing 382 82 mm mortar rounds and 21,00 rounds of 7.62×39 mm. At 17:15, a unit of the 1st Brigade, 1st infantry Division, engaged an enemy force 9 miles (14 km) south of Phước Vĩnh. The enemy withdrew after ten minutes leaving 16 dead; U.S. losses were one killed. At 20:00, 15 107/122 mm rockets hit Long Binh Post causing minimal damage. On 9 December at 10:45, a company from the 2nd Brigade, 1st Cavalry Division, operating 4 miles (6.4 km) west-southwest of An Lộc, engaged an enemy force. The enemy withdrew at 13:40, but the unit pursued and reengaged until the enemy withdrew at 16:30, leaving 93 dead and one crew-served weapon and 53 RPG-2 grenades; U.S. losses were 14 killed. At 11:50 mechanized infantry from the 2nd Brigade, 25th Infantry Division, engaged an enemy force 6 miles (9.7 km) southwest of Bến Cát supported by artillery and helicopter gunships. The enemy withdrew, leaving 14 dead as well as two individual and three crew-served weapons; U.S. losses were two soldiers and one Kit Carson Scout killed. At 23:30, U.S. and ARVN positions around An Lộc received mortar fire that caused minimal damage.

On 10 December at 00:50, a 1st Cavalry Division landing zone 1 mile (1.6 km) south of An Lộc was hit by 40–50 107 mm rockets causing minimal damage. At 13:00, a unit of the 3rd Brigade, 25th Infantry Division, engaged a PAVN force 4 miles (6.4 km) northeast of Trảng Bàng. The PAVN withdrew after two hours, but were pursued by helicopter gunships and finally broke contact at 18:15 leaving 14 dead, one captured, and one individual and one crew-served weapons; U.S. losses were two killed. At 14:00, two companies of the 3rd Brigade, 1st Cavalry Division, engaged an enemy force 6 miles (9.7 km) north of Đồng Xoài, supported by helicopter gunships. The enemy withdrew after three hours leaving 14 dead, and one crew-served weapon and two multiple 107 mm rocket launchers; U.S. losses were three killed. On 11 December at 07:55, a unit of the 3rd Brigade, 25th Infantry Division, air-assaulted into an area 4 miles (6.4 km) northeast of Trảng Bàng and the landing zone was attacked by two enemy companies. The enemy then withdrew, but the unit reestablished contact at 10:50 and was reinforced by another brigade unit, supported by artillery, helicopter gunships and airstrikes. The enemy withdrew at 17:45, leaving ten dead and two captured; U.S. losses were two killed. At 17:15, mechanized infantry of the 2nd Brigade, 25th Infantry Division, engaged an enemy platoon 9 miles (14 km) west of Bến Cát, the enemy withdrew after two hours leaving ten dead, one captured and one individual weapon. An AH-1 Cobra was shot down 30 miles (48 km) west of Saigon.

On 12 December, aeroscouts of the 2nd Brigade, 1st Cavalry Division, attacked an enemy force 2 miles (3.2 km) north of An Lộc, killing 12. On 13 December at midday, mechanized infantry of the 2nd Brigade, 25th Infantry Division, engaged an enemy force 5 miles (8.0 km) northeast of Trảng Bàng; other brigade units joined the battle, which continued until 18:45, when the enemy withdrew leaving 22 dead, and six individual and three crew-served weapons; U.S. losses were six killed. An OH-6 was shot down 6 miles (9.7 km) southwest of Trảng Bàng, killing one on board. On 14 December at 16:45, artillerymen from a unit of the 9th Infantry Division found five 107 mm rockets 7 miles (11 km) east of Tân An. At 17:40, helicopter gunships of the 1/9th Cavalry attacked an enemy force 9 miles (14 km) north of Tây Ninh, killing 20. At 19:00, a firebase 20 miles (32 km) east-southeast of Tây Ninh received 100 rounds of mortar and rocket fire that caused minimal damage.

On 15 December at 04:30, the Dầu Tiếng Base Camp was hit by 30 rounds of 82 mm mortar, causing minimal damage. At 08:15, mechanized infantry of the 1st Brigade, 25th Infantry Division, engaged an enemy platoon 7 miles (11 km) northeast of Tây Ninh, the enemy withdrew at 13:30 leaving 18 dead; U.S. losses were two killed. On 16 December at 10:45, a unit of the 3rd Brigade, 1st Infantry Division, found 16 PAVN/VC dead 5 miles (8.0 km) south of Phước Vĩnh; all were killed by a B-52 strike earlier that day. At 21:30, a reconnaissance unit of the 25th Infantry Division attacked a sampan carrying PAVN/VC across the Saigon River 6 miles (9.7 km) southwest of Bến Cát, killing 15.

On 17 December at 11:00, a 25th Infantry Division supply convoy was ambushed 4 miles (6.4 km) west-southwest of Dầu Tiếng. The convoy security forces engaged the enemy, supported by artillery, helicopter gunships and airstrikes, and were reinforced by mechanized infantry of the Division's 3rd Brigade. The enemy withdrew at 13:40 leaving 73 dead; U.S. losses were five killed. On 18 December, helicopters of the 1/9th Cavalry attacked an enemy battalion 12 miles (19 km) northeast of Phước Bình, killing 41 PAVN/VC. At 10:00, mechanized infantry from the 2nd Brigade, 25th Infantry Division, patrolling 4 miles north-northwest of Củ Chi, engaged an enemy squadron; contact was lost at 12:15 but regained at 15:30. The enemy withdrew at 18:45 leaving 15 dead; U.S. losses were one killed. At 13:00, helicopters of the 1/9th Cavalry spotted an entrenched enemy force 9 miles (14 km) southeast of Katum and directed airstrikes onto the location. A search of the bunkers found 17 PAVN/VC dead.

On 19 December at 13:30, a unit of the 1st Brigade, 1st Infantry Division, engaged an enemy force 9 miles (14 km) north of Phước Vĩnh, killing one, and discovering three dead and an arms cache containing 25 pistols, four RPG-7 launchers, three AK-47s and one SKS. At 15:30, a company from the 3rd Brigade, 82nd Airborne Division, found a munitions cache 3 miles (4.8 km) northeast of Hóc Môn, containing 100 RPG-2 grenades and 100 82 mm mortar rounds. On 20 December at 14:00, mechanized infantry from the 2nd Brigade, 25th Infantry Division, patrolling 4 miles (6.4 km) east of Trảng Bàng engaged an enemy battalion. The unit was supported by artillery, helicopter gunships and airstrikes, and later reinforced by an addition four companies inserted into blocking positions. The enemy withdrew at 21:30, leaving 30 dead, and three individual and four crew-served weapons; U.S. losses were one killed. At 14:40 an aerial observer saw 60 PAVN/VC 3 miles east of Dầu Tiếng and directed artillery fire onto them killing 15.

On 21 December at 09:40, a unit of the 199th LIB found a weapons cache 4 miles (6.4 km) northeast of Bến Lức containing 11 AK-47s and 31 RPG-7 grenades. At 13:00, a unit of the Mobile Riverine Force (MRF) was attacked 5 miles (8.0 km) northeast of Cần Đước. The unit was supported by helicopter gunships and another MRF unit joined the battle. The enemy withdrew at 15:25, leaving 14 dead, 18 captured and 14 individual weapons. At 14:00, helicopters from the 9th Infantry Division attacked an enemy squadron 6 miles (9.7 km) northeast of Cần Đước, killing 12 and capturing one individual weapon. On 22 December at 001:15, a unit of the 3rd Brigade, 25th Infantry Division, in night-defensive positions 7 miles (11 km) northwest of Go Dau Ha, was attacked. The unit returned fire, supported by artillery, helicopter gunships, AC-47s and airstrikes. The enemy withdrew at 06:35, and a sweep of the area by the unit and a unit of the ARVN Airborne Division found 81 PAVN/VC dead, 25 AK-47s, nine light machineguns, three pistols, 78 RPG-2 grenades, 38 RPG-7 grenades and two radios. A further sweep of the area found another 22 PAVN/VC dead; U.S. losses were 17 killed.

On 23 December, between 10:00 and 1:15, two companies from the 199th LIB operating 13 miles (21 km) north-northeast of Tân An, found two munitions caches containing 212 60 mm mortar rounds and 130 RPG grenades. On 24 December at 18:00, a Christmas ceasefire came into effect. Nevertheless, at 18:35 a unit of the 3rd Brigade, 1st infantry Division, engaged an enemy force 6 miles (9.7 km) west of Bến Cát killing five, and capturing two individual and one crew-served weapons. At 18:50 a unit of the 2nd Brigade, 1st Cavalry Division, patrolling 11 miles (18 km) southeast of Katum, killed one PAVN/VC and captured one weapon. Also at 18:50, a company from the 3rd Brigade, 25th Infantry Division, in a night-defensive position 2 miles (3.2 km) northeast of Dầu Tiếng, received ten rounds of 82 mm mortar fire. At 19:00 a unit of the 3rd Brigade, 1st Infantry Division, patrolling 4 miles (6.4 km) southwest of Lai Khê, was attacked by an enemy squadron that quickly withdrew. At 20:20, a unit of the 11th ACR 9 miles (14 km) southeast of Bến Cát, engaged six PAVN/VC killing one and capturing one weapon. At 20:40, an ARVN firebase 3 miles (4.8 km) west-northwest of Bình Sơn was hit by 140 rounds of mortar fire, causing minimal damage—an AC-47 attacked the firing position. At 21:30, a company from the 199th LIB in a night-defensive position 6 miles (9.7 km) southeast of Đức Hòa was attacked by an enemy force that immediately withdrew. At 21:55, a U.S. Navy PBR engaged a sampan near the Bến Lức bridge; all three on board jumped into the river and one was captured along with an AK-47. At 00:20 on 25 December, an base of the 2nd Brigade, 1st Infantry Division, 6 miles (9.7 km) southwest of Bến Cát, was hit by an RPG, causing minimal damage.

On 25 December at 09:30, an OV-1 was hit by ground fire 11 miles (18 km) northwest of An Lộc, killing one crewman. At 18:15, a USAF FAC observed 100–150 PAVN/VC moving 12 miles (19 km) east-southeast of Katum; at 18:30, the 1/9th Cavalry supported by artillery attacked the force, killing 12. On 26 December at 09:00, the 1/9th Cavalry, supported by artillery and airstrikes, engaged 60 PAVN/VC 12 miles (19 km) east of Katum, killing 41. At 11:00, a company from the 199th LIB operating 14 miles (23 km) southwest of Saigon found a weapons cache containing eight 122 mm rocket motors. At 22:00, helicopter gunships from the 9th Infantry Division, operating 4 miles (6.4 km) northeast of Cần Đước, attacked 16 sampans— all of them were destroyed, killing ten PAVN/VC. On 27 December at midday, mechanized infantry from the 1st Infantry Division, operating 6 miles (9.7 km) northwest of An Lộc, engaged a PAVN company. The PAVN withdrew at 16:30, leaving 52 dead, three captured, and three individual and five crew-served weapons; U.S. losses were two killed. Between 13:30 and 15:00, the 1/9th Cavalry conducted a bomb damage assessment of airstrikes 7 miles (11 km) northeast of Phước Bình finding 20 PAVN/VC killed among ten destroyed bunkers.

On 28 December at 09:30, helicopters from the 1/9th Cavalry, operating 22 miles (35 km) southwest of Phước Bình, received ground fire. In response they attacked the firing positions and called in airstrikes. A survey of the strike area discovered 59 PAVN/VC dead. A UH-1 was shot down 5 miles (8.0 km) east-northeast of Dầu Tiếng, killing two on board. On 29 December at 13:00, mechanized infantry of the 2nd Brigade, 25th Infantry Division, found the bodies of 32 PAVN/VC 5 miles (8.0 km) east of Trảng Bàng. At 20:00, Phước Vĩnh Base Camp was hit by 40 107 mm rockets and 75 mm recoilless rifle fire, and an hour later by five mortar rounds; the attacks caused little damage. An OH-6 was shot down 15 miles (24 km) west of Katum. On 30 December at 09:30, five 107 mm rockets hit Dầu Tiếng Base Camp, causing minimal damage. At 11:30, U.S. Navy PBRs found a munitions cache 9 miles (14 km) north of Tân An containing 36,000 rounds of 7.62×39 mm, 11 RPG-2 grenades and 21 RPG-7 grenades. A UH-1 was shot down 7 miles (11 km) north of Phước Vĩnh. On 31 December at 10:45, a unit of the 199th LIB found a munitions cache 16 miles (26 km) northwest of Cần Đước containing 147 60 mm mortar rounds. Between 13:00 and 14:20, units of the 1st Brigade, 1st Cavalry Division, found two munitions caches 6 miles (9.7 km) south of Go Dau Ha containing 87,00 rounds of small arms ammunition, 45 122 mm rockets, 571 60 mm mortar rounds, 162 82 mm mortar rounds and 75 RPG-2 grenades. At 13:00, a unit of the 11th ACR engaged an enemy force 3 miles (4.8 km) southeast of Lai Khê; an infantry platoon was landed in support and the enemy withdrew at 15:15, leaving 13 dead, seven captured, and four individual and one crew-served weapons; U.S. losses were one killed. At 13:30, a unit of the 2nd Brigade, 25th Infantry Division, found 14 PAVN/VC dead 9 miles (14 km) northwest of Củ Chi—all had been killed by artillery three days earlier.

Cumulative operational results to the end of December were 13,777 PAVN/VC killed, 6,973 captured and 3,868 individual and 878 crew-served weapons captured. U.S. losses were 1,523 killed.

=== January ===
On 1 January, Staff Sergeant Rodney J. T. Yano, of the air cavalry squadron of the 11th ACR, saved the lives of the crew of his UH-1, when a white phosphorus grenade exploded on the helicopter during operations near Biên Hòa. For his actions, he was posthumously awarded the Medal of Honor. On 3 January, an explosion in the mess hall of the 20th Engineer Brigade at Củ Chi Base Camp killed 15. On 11 January 1969, a convoy was ambushed on Highway 13 near Quần Lợi. First Lieutenant Harold A. Fritz organized the defense, actions for which he was later awarded the Medal of Honor. On 14 January, a convoy of the 48th Transportation Group was ambushed in Tây Ninh Province. 122 PAVN/VC were killed, and three individual and one crew-served weapons were captured; U.S. losses were seven killed. Also on 14 January in Tây Ninh Province, First Lieutenant John E. Warren Jr. smothered an enemy hand grenade with his body, an action for which he was posthumously awarded the Medal of Honor. On 30 January, Company D of the 2nd Battalion, 8th Cavalry Regiment, found an underground hospital complex under construction 19 kilometres (12 mi) north of Phú Cường. On 31 January, a unit of the 2nd Battalion, 12th Cavalry Regiment, found 69 tons of rice in two caches in Tây Ninh Province.

=== February ===
On 1 February at 00:10, a firebase of the 3rd Brigade (1st Infantry Division) 7 miles (11 km) northeast of Dầu Tiếng, was hit by 160 rounds of 60/82 mm mortar fire followed by a ground probe. The defenders returned fire, supported by artillery, helicopter gunships, AC-47s and airstrikes, and the enemy withdrew at 04:45, leaving behind 14 dead; U.S. losses were two killed. At 08:30, helicopter gunships of the 1/9th Cavalry attacked an entrenched enemy force 8 miles (13 km) south of Katum, and called in artillery and airstrikes, killing 28 PAVN/VC and destroying three bunkers. A company from the 2nd Brigade, 1st Cavalry Division, that was patrolling 12 miles (19 km) northeast of Phú Cường, found a weapons cache containing 33 SKS, three light machineguns, three 60 mm mortars and one 75 mm recoilless rifle. A unit of the 1st Brigade, 1st Cavalry Division, found a 12-ton rice cache 3 miles (4.8 km) northeast of Phú Cường, while the 1/9th Cavalry found a 10-ton rice cache 5 miles (8.0 km) southeast of Lộc Ninh. At 16:00, a company from the 3rd Brigade, 9th Infantry Division, patrolling 10 miles (16 km) north of Tân An, engaged an enemy force; sporadic contact continued until the enemy withdrew at 23:05, leaving 53 dead, two captured and 27 individual and two crew-served weapons. At 21:00, a unit of the 3rd Brigade, 82nd Airborne Division, engaged 10–15 PAVN/VC 5 miles (8.0 km) west of Phú Cường, killing nine, and capturing two AK-47s and three pistols.

On 2 February at 08:45, a company from the 199th LIB operating 22 miles (35 km) northwest of Saigon engaged an enemy squadron; at 09:30 a unit of the 2nd Brigade, 25th Infantry Division, reinforced them. The enemy withdrew at 19:10 leaving 18 dead; U.S. losses were six killed. A unit of the 1st Brigade, 1st Cavalry Division, found an 8-ton rice cache 3 miles (4.8 km) northeast of Phú Cường. At midday, a unit of the armored cavalry squadron of the 25th Infantry Division engaged an enemy company 4 miles (6.4 km) north of Go Dau Ha. The unit was supported by artillery, helicopter gunships and airstrikes, and reinforced at 18:20 by a South Vietnamese Marine battalion. The enemy withdrew at 23:10 leaving 42 dead; U.S. losses were three killed. On 3 February at 10:45, a company from the 2nd Brigade, 1st Cavalry Division, operating 22 miles (35 km) northeast of Tây Ninh, found a munitions bunker containing 61 82 mm mortar rounds and three sniper rifles. At 12:30, a unit of the 11th ACR patrolling 5 miles (8.0 km) north of Lai Khê engaged an enemy force. The enemy withdrew at 17:50 leaving 18 dead, seven captured, and three individual and one crew-served weapons; U.S. losses were two killed. At 18:30, a firebase of the 25th Infantry Division 9 miles (14 km) northwest of Go Dau Ha was hit by 15 107 mm rockets, causing minimal damage.

On 4 February at 00:50, Katum Camp was hit by 100 rounds of 60/82/120 mm mortar fire causing little damage. At 15:00, a unit of the armored cavalry squadron of the 25th infantry Division, patrolling 3 miles (4.8 km) northeast of Dầu Tiếng and supported by artillery and airstrikes, upon engaging six enemy bunkers foumd 16 PAVN/VC dead in the wreckage. On 5 February, a UH-1 was shot down in Long Khánh Province killing four on board. On 6 February at 20:00, a unit of the 3rd Brigade, 9th Infantry Division, engaged 20 PAVN/VC 7 miles (11 km) northeast of Tân An; the enemy withdrew but then attacked the unit again before withdrawing at 23:00, leaving 14 dead. At 22:30 a unit of the 3rd Brigade, 9th Infantry Division, in a night-defensive position 9 miles (14 km) east-southeast of Tân An received a ground probe; the unit returned fire and the enemy withdrew after 30 minutes.

On 7 February at 11:00, a company from the 1st Brigade, 1st Cavalry Division, found a 28-ton rice cache 16 miles (26 km) northeast of Tây Ninh. On 8 February at 06:30, three U.S. civilian employees of Lear Siegler contracted to the U.S. military were ambushed as they drove along Highway 15 2.5 miles (4.0 km) north of Long Thành; two were killed. At 13:20, a unit of the 2nd Brigade, 25th Infantry Division, engaged an enemy force 7 miles (11 km) southwest of Bến Cát, supported by artillery, helicopter gunships and airstrikes. The enemy withdrew at 19:45, leaving 12 dead, and seven individual and four crew-served weapons; U.S. losses were one soldier and one Kit Carson Scout killed. Also at 13:30, mechanized infantry of the 2nd Brigade, 25th Infantry Division, engaged an enemy force 11 miles (18 km) southwest of Bến Cát. The unit was supported by artillery, helicopter gunships and airstrikes until the enemy withdrew at 19:45, leaving 22 dead, and two individual and one crew-served weapon; U.S. losses were five killed. At 14:30, a helicopter gunship from the 1/9th Cavalry received fire 11 miles (18 km) east of Lộc Ninh; they returned fire and directed airstrikes onto the location. Aerorifle troops were landed and found 16 PAVN/VC dead and one crew-served weapon among eight destroyed bunkers. At 16:30, a CIDG unit searching a bunker complex in the same area was engaged by an enemy force and supporting fire was provided by helicopter gunships and airstrikes until the enemy withdrew at 17:40. The 1/9th Cavalry aerorifle platoon was landed and found 17 PAVN/VC killed and one crew-served weapon.

On 9 February at 12:30, an armored unit from the 25th Infantry Division found a munitions cache 11 miles (18 km) northwest of Phú Cường containing 22 107 mm rockets, 18 122 mm rockets, 45 82 mm mortar rounds and 33 RPG-7 grenades. At 13:00, a unit of the 3rd Brigade, 9th Infantry Division, found a munitions cache 7 miles (11 km) west of Bến Lức containing 517 RPG grenades and 62,000 rounds of 7.62×39 mm. At 17:00, a unit of the 2nd Brigade, 1st Cavalry Division, found a 20-ton rice cache 11 miles (18 km) south of Katum. An OH-6 was shot down 9 miles (14 km) east-southeast of Katum. On 10 February at 10:15, a unit of the 2nd Brigade, 1st Cavalry Division, found a 30-ton rice cache 11 miles (18 km) south of Katum. At 16:00, the 1/9th Cavalry found 150 82 mm mortar rounds 21 miles (34 km) southwest of An Lộc. At 18:30, an base camp 2 miles (3.2 km) west of Tây Ninh was hit by 10 107 mm rockets, causing minimal damage.

On 11 February at 14:30, a unit of the armored cavalry squadron of the 25th Infantry Division found a 10-ton rice cache 4 miles (6.4 km) north of Trảng Bàng. At 21:50, helicopter gunships attacked 100 PAVN/VC 11 miles (18 km) east of Biên Hòa. Nearby, a reconnaissance unit found a 122 mm rocket firing position. Both positions were hit by artillery, helicopter gunships, AC-47s and airstrikes throughout the night causing numerous secondary explosions; 50 PAVN/VC casualties were discovered in the strike areas. At 23:00, the Bình Điền bridge and an base of the 199th LIB 2 miles (3.2 km) northeast of Bình Chánh District were hit by mortar and RPG fire. The firing continued for 20 minutes until the enemy withdrew. On 12 February at 10:30, a unit of the 2nd Brigade, 1st Cavalry Division, found a 10-ton rice cache 10 miles (16 km) south of Katum. At midday, a unit of the 1st Infantry Division found a weapons cache 5 miles (8.0 km) east of Cat Lai containing 44 individual weapons. Also at midday, aeroscouts from the 1/9th Cavalry received ground fire 9 miles (14 km) northwest of Phước Bình with two OH-6s and one UH-1 being shot down with three crewmen killed. Artillery and airstrikes were called in killing 64 PAVN/VC.

On 13 February at 14:00, a unit of the 2nd Brigade, 25th Infantry Division, found a 32-ton rice cache 7 miles (11 km) northeast of Trảng Bàng. At 16:00, helicopter gunships of the 2nd Brigade, 1st Cavalry Division, drew fire 1 mile (1.6 km) north of Lộc Ninh and returned fire, killing 11 PAVN/VC and destroying ten huts. A UH-1 medevac was shot down 5 miles (8.0 km) east-northeast of Trảng Bàng. On 14 February at 10:30, a unit of the armored cavalry squadron of the 25th Infantry Division found a 5-ton rice cache 7 miles (11 km) northeast of Go Dau Ha. An hour later, another unit operating in the same area found another 6 tons of rice and destroyed 48 bunkers. On 15 February at 01:00, a unit of the 3rd Brigade, 9th Infantry Division, in a night-defensive position 7 miles (11 km) southeast of Tân An, was attacked by an enemy company. The unit returned fire, supported by artillery and helicopter gunships. The enemy withdrew leaving three dead and nine 107 mm rockets and an RPG launcher; U.S. losses were two killed. At 09:15, an OH-6 from the 1/9th Cavalry was shot down 12 miles (19 km) northeast of Tây Ninh and the aerorifle platoon was landed at the crash site. At 09:40, two UH-1s extracting troops from the area were shot down resulting in five U.S. killed.

On 16 February at 14:40, a unit of the 1st Brigade, 1st Cavalry Division, was attacked 9 miles (14 km) northeast of Phú Cường. The unit returned fire, supported by helicopter gunships and airstrikes, and the enemy withdrew at 17:25; U.S. losses were one killed. At 16:00, mechanized infantry of the 2nd Brigade, 25th Infantry Division, supported by artillery and helicopter gunships, engaged an enemy force 9 miles (14 km) southwest of Bến Cát. The enemy withdrew at 17:30, leaving 32 dead, and 15 individual and six crew-served weapons. At 18:00, Allied forces suspended operations for a 24-hour Tết ceasefire.

== Aftermath ==
The operation ended on 16 February 1969. A total of 25,428 PAVN/VC were killed, 10,724 prisoners and suspects were captured as well as 10,285 individual and 2,307 crew-served weapons along with 1,698 tons of rice. U.S. losses were 1,798 killed. It was immediately followed by Operation Toan Thang III, conducted by the same units in the same operational area.
