= Rodney J. T. Yano =

U.S. Army Medal of Honor recipient

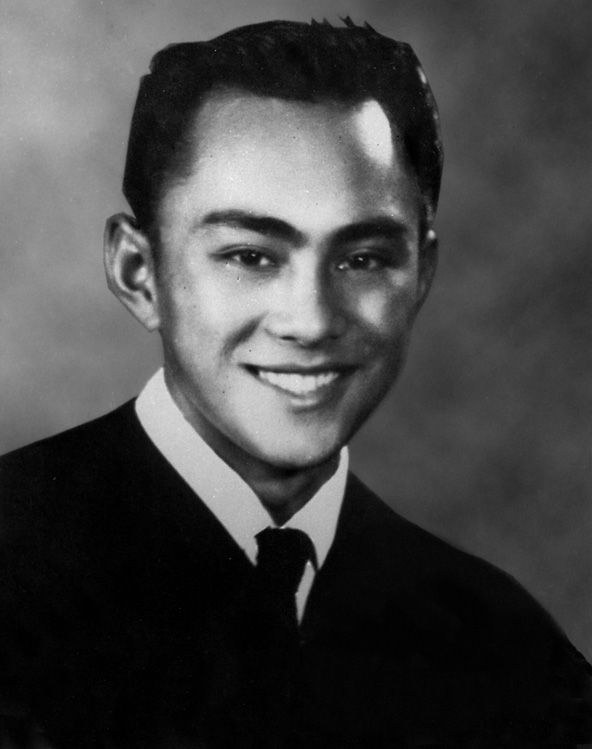
- Rodney Yano
- Born: December 13, 1943; Kealakekua, Kona district, Territory of Hawaii, U.S.
- Died: January 1, 1969 (aged 25) near Biên Hòa, Dong Nai Province, Republic of Vietnam
- Burial place: National Memorial Cemetery of the Pacific, Honolulu, Hawaii
- Military career
- Allegiance: United States of America
- Branch: United States Army
- Service years: 1963–1969
- Rank: Sergeant First Class
- Unit: 11th Armored Cavalry Regiment
- Conflicts: Vietnam War (DOW)
- Awards: Medal of Honor; Air Medal; Purple Heart

Rodney James Takashi Yano (Japanese: 矢野 孝, romanized: Yano Takashi, December 13, 1943 – January 1, 1969) was a United States Army soldier and a recipient of the United States military's highest decoration—the Medal of Honor—for his actions in the Vietnam War.

== Early life ==
Yano was born in Hawaii. His grandparents were Japanese immigrants. Yano was a Sansei, which means that he was a third generation Japanese-American.

== Military service and Medal of Honor ==
Yano left high school without graduating, joined the Army from Honolulu, Hawaii in 1961, and served in the field of helicopter maintenance. By January 1, 1969, he was serving as a staff sergeant in the Air Cavalry Troop, 11th Armored Cavalry Regiment. On that day, near Biên Hòa in the Republic of Vietnam, Yano, who was normally a technical inspector, volunteered to act as helicopter crew chief and door gunner on the aircraft commanded by John Bahnsen during combat action in Operation Toan Thang II. As one of two door gunners, he delivered machine gun fire while marking enemy positions with smoke and white phosphorus grenades, enabling Bahnsen to direct artillery fire against them.

During the fight, a white phosphorus grenade exploded prematurely inside the aircraft; the pilot and co-pilot could not see because of the smoke, and the aircraft began to descend. Despite being burned and partially blinded and having lost the use of one arm, Yano proceeded to throw and kick the remaining ammunition off the helicopter as flaming grenade fragments caused it to catch fire and detonate. Yano received additional wounds as a result of these actions, which caused his death later that day. His actions enabled the crew to regain control of the aircraft, fly to the 93rd Evacuation Hospital, and land safely. Yano's actions were credited with saving the lives of the others on board the helicopter. He was posthumously promoted to Sergeant First Class.

Yano, aged 25 at his death, was buried in the National Memorial Cemetery of the Pacific, Honolulu, Hawaii.

== Medal of Honor citation ==
Rodney J. T. Yano

Sergeant First Class Yano's official Medal of Honor citation reads:

Sfc. Yano distinguished himself while serving with the Air Cavalry Troop. Sfc. Yano was performing the duties of crew chief aboard the troop's command-and-control helicopter during action against enemy forces entrenched in dense jungle. From an exposed position in the face of intense small arms and antiaircraft fire he delivered suppressive fire upon the enemy forces and marked their positions with smoke and white phosphorus grenades, thus enabling his troop commander to direct accurate and effective artillery fire against the hostile emplacements. A grenade, exploding prematurely, covered him with burning phosphorus, and left him severely wounded. Flaming fragments within the helicopter caused supplies and ammunition to detonate. Dense white smoke filled the aircraft, obscuring the pilot's vision and causing him to lose control. Although having the use of only 1 arm and being partially blinded by the initial explosion, Sfc. Yano completely disregarded his welfare and began hurling blazing ammunition from the helicopter. In so doing he inflicted additional wounds upon himself, yet he persisted until the danger was past. Sfc. Yano's indomitable courage and profound concern for his comrades averted loss of life and additional injury to the rest of the crew. By his conspicuous gallantry at the cost of his life, in the highest traditions of the military service, Sfc. Yano has reflected great credit on himself, his unit, and the U.S. Army.

== Namesake ==
Yano is the namesake of the USNS Yano (T-AKR-297), a Shughart class cargo ship. She is a 'roll-on roll-off' non-combat United States Navy designated a "Large, Medium-speed, roll-on/roll-off" (LMSR) ship.

Yano Multipurpose Range at Fort Knox, Yano Fitness Center at Camp Zama, Japan, Sgt. Yano Library at Schofield Barracks, Hawaii and Yano Hall Helicopter Maintenance Facility at Fort Novosel, Alabama are named in his honor.

Yano Hall – Recreational Public Facility – Captain Cook, Kona, Big Island of Hawaii

Yano Street - Ft Carson

== See also ==
- List of Medal of Honor recipients
- List of Medal of Honor recipients for the Vietnam War
