= USNS Yano =

Cargo ship of the United States Navy

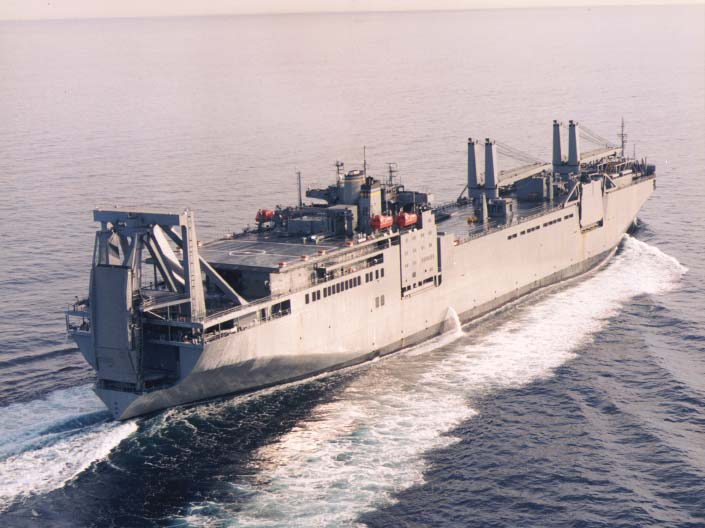

History

United States
- Name: Leise Maersk
- Namesake: Rodney J. T. Yano
- Owner: United States Navy
- Operator: Military Sealift Command
- Builder: Lindovaerftet, Odense, Denmark
- Launched: 19 September 1980
- Completed: 17 December 1980
- In service: 8 February 1997
- Renamed: Yano
- Reclassified: T-AKR 297
- Refit: 1996
- Stricken: 21 March 2023
- Home port: Newport News, Virginia
- Identification: IMO number: 7825409; MMSI number: 367821000; Callsign: NAQH
- Status: Stricken

General characteristics
- Class & type: Shughart class
- Displacement: 54,450 t.(fl)
- Length: 908 ft (277 m)
- Beam: 106 ft (32 m)
- Draft: 34 ft (10 m)
- Ramps: 3 ramps, 5 when fully deployed
- Propulsion: 1 × 1 Burmeister & Wain 12L90 GFCA diesel; 1 shaft; bow and stern thrusters; 1 shaft; cp props
- Speed: 24 knots (44 km/h)
- Capacity: 312,461 sq ft (29,028.6 m^{2}); 49,991 sq ft (4,644.3 m^{2}) deck cargo
- Complement: 26 reduced / up to 45 full, civilian mariners; 50 US Navy personnel
- Crew: 26 civilian crew (up to 45); up to 50 active duty

USNS Yano (T-AKR-297) was originally constructed as the container ship Leise Maersk in 1980. In 1987, the ship was lengthened and again in the 1990s before it was purchased by the United States Navy. When the transfer was complete, the ship underwent a conversion to a large, medium-speed, roll-on/roll-off ship at NASSCO.

== Military service ==
Yano entered service under Military Sealift Command on 8 February 1997, and was named after Medal of Honor recipient United States Army Sergeant First Class Rodney J. T. Yano. It has since served a role in basic military transport of material to bases around the world and served a vital role in the transport of material to both the Iraq and Afghanistan wars. the ship was operated by Patriot Contract Services, LLC under US Navy Military Sealift Command charter, and was crewed by US Merchant Marine personnel.

On February 25, 1996, in San Diego, California, the ship broke her mooring lines and collided with the USS Vandegrift. The frigate suffered hull damage.

On 21 March 2023, Yano was stricken from the Naval Vessel Register.
