= Toshinobu Yano =

Japanese photographer

Toshinobu Yano (矢野 敏延, Yano Toshinobu; birth and death years unknown) was a Japanese photographer active in the 1930s. His interwar work was later included in the Osaka section of the Tokyo Photographic Art Museum exhibition Avant-Garde Rising: The Photographic Vanguard in Modern Japan.
