= Inner Cambodia =

Historical region of present-day Cambodia

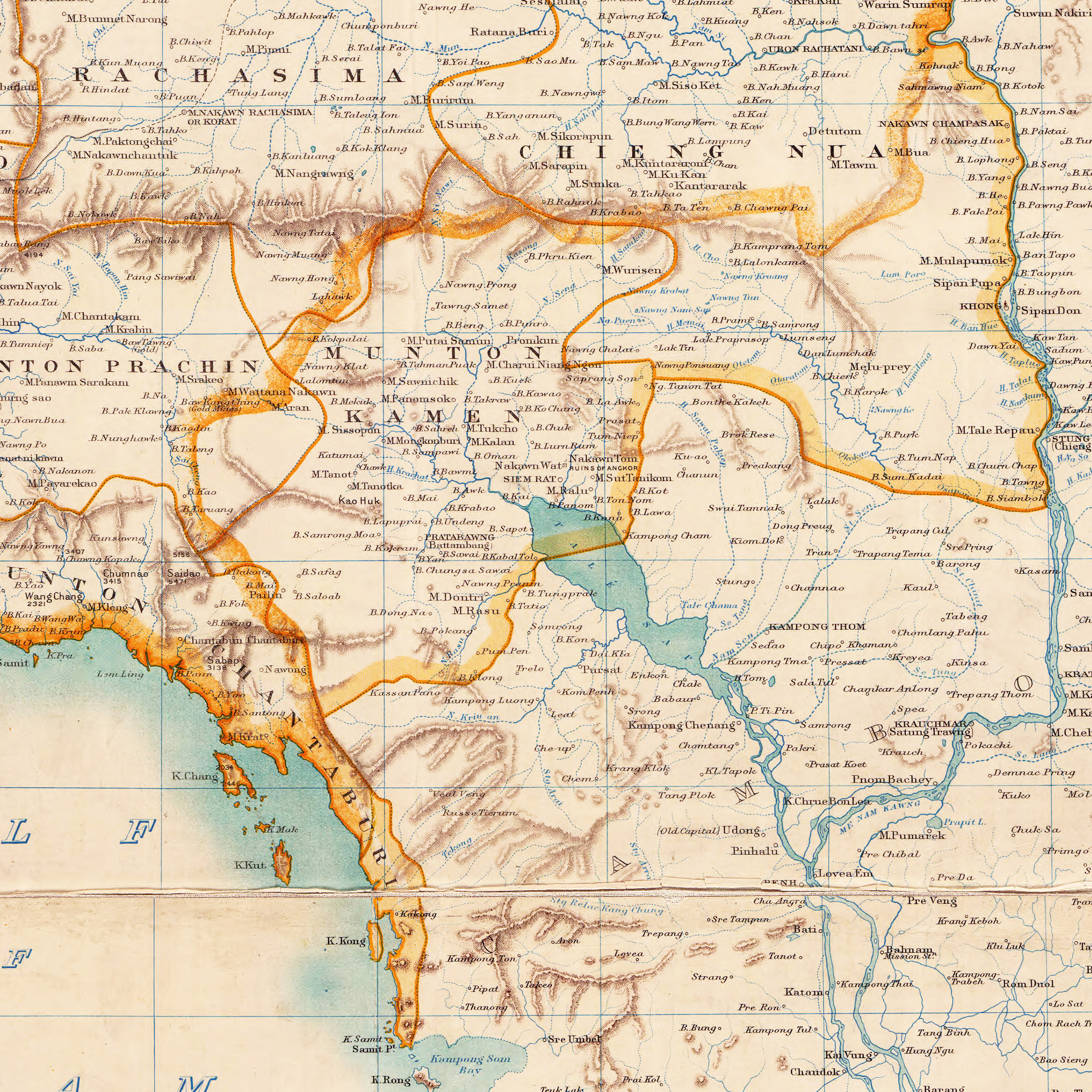
Detail from James McCarthy's 1900 map of Siam, showing Inner Cambodia as Munton Kamen (Monthon Khamen), as well as the national boundaries of the time, superimposed with those later adopted in 1907

Inner Cambodia (Note: From Thai: เขมรส่วนใน Khamen Suan Nai 'inner Khmer') was a historical region in present-day Cambodia that was under the direct rule of Siam (Thailand) between 1794 and 1907. It covered much of north-western Cambodia, and included, most significantly, the cities of Phra Tabong, Siemmarat and Si Sophon (Note: พระตะบอง, เสียมราฐ and ศรีโสภณ) (now known by the Khmer names Battambang, Siem Reap, and Serei Saophoan). The region was ruled by a Bangkok-appointed governor who held the title Aphaiphubet, and was incorporated under the monthon administrative system in 1891, becoming known as Monthon Burapha (Note: มณฑลบูรพา) in 1900. The territory remained under Thai control until 1907, when it was ceded to France and incorporated into French Indochina. The region was again briefly annexed by Thailand in World War II from 1941 to 1946.

== Establishment of Siamese rule ==
In the late 18th century, post-Angkor Cambodia was much weakened against its neighbours Siam to the west and Vietnam to the east, who fought for influence over the smaller country. Following factional struggles in the 1770s, a pro-Siam nobleman named Baen (Note: Also spelled Ben.) brought Prince Ang Eng, the only male survivor of the Cambodian royal family, to take refuge in Bangkok under the Siamese King Rama I. Baen received the title Chaophraya Aphaiphubet from the Thai court, and was established as the de facto ruler in the Cambodian royal capital of Oudong.

When the Prince was allowed to return to Cambodia to assume the throne in 1794, Rama I had the northwestern area of the country, which constituted most of its border with Siam, placed under the control of Baen, who was instituted as governor of the region, based in Battambang (known in Thai as Phra Tabong). Siem Reap (Siem Rap in Thai, (Note: เสียมราบ) later changed to Siemmarat), the site of the ancient Khmer capital of Angkor, was the other major town in the region, the most fertile in Cambodia. This served a twofold purpose, strengthening Siam's control over the frontier while removing Baen from the conflict in Oudong, where his rule was deeply unpopular. The region, whose governor ruled autonomously according to Cambodian customs but reported directly to Bangkok, became known to the Thais as Inner Cambodia, while the remainder, Outer Cambodia, continued to be ruled by the Cambodian monarch, who was at various times under tributary status to Siam, Vietnam, or both.

Following Baen's death in 1809 shortly after that of Rama I, the new Thai king Rama II named Baen's son as the new governor at Phra Tabong, inheriting the Aphaiphubet title. While Khmer sources would later dispute the act, stating that the arrangement was originally understood to be limited to Baen's lifetime, it established the hereditary succession which placed rule over the region in the hands of the Abhayavongsa family for much of the following century, except for the period between 1834 and 1839, when the Thai court granted the role to the Cambodian prince Ang Im.

Phra Tabong served as an outpost from which Siam launched military expeditions into Cambodia, especially during its wars with Vietnam in 1833–1834 and 1841–1845, during the reign of Rama III. The Thai military commander Chaophraya Bodindecha, who led the campaigns, oversaw the reconstruction of the city and its fortifications from 1837 to 1838, and did so in Siemmarat as well. He also founded the towns of Mongkhon Buri (Note: มงคลบุรี) (now Mongkol Borey) and Si Sophon (Serei Saophoan), the latter of which was mainly populated by Lao forced settlers following Siam's conquest of Vientiane in the 1826–1828 war.

== Colonial pressures ==
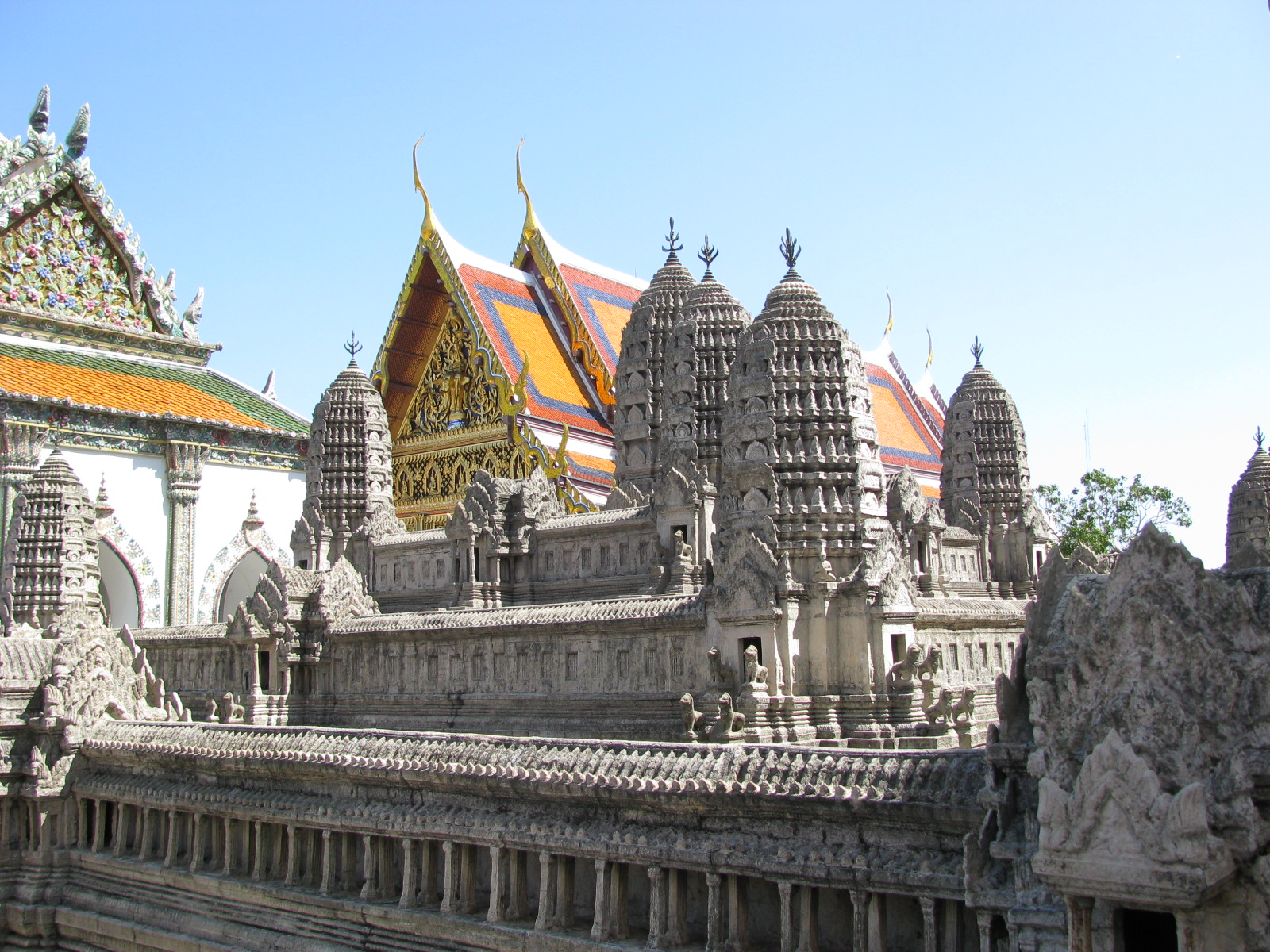
The scale model of Angkor Wat at Wat Phra Kaew, completed in 1882

With France's colonial expansion into Southeast Asia in the second half of the 19th century, the French protectorate of Cambodia was established in 1863. After a few years of diplomatic manoeuvring over Cambodia's tributary status, the Franco-Siamese treaty of 1867 was concluded in Paris, in which Siam recognized the protectorate and relinquished its claims to suzerainty over Cambodia, while France recognized Siam's territorial claims over Battambang and Siem Reap, including the monument of Angkor Wat (though some officials of French Indochina had opposed Siam's claims). Nevertheless, the French expressed continued interest in the ruins of Angkor, which had been popularized in the Western imagination by the writings of Henri Mouhot following his travels there in 1860.

Siam's King Mongkut (Rama IV) also showed interest in the monuments, and also in 1860 he had ordered the dismantling of a small Khmer temple for reconstruction in Bangkok. (Note: The Thai royal chronicles name the temple as Phathai Ta Phrom (ผไทตาพรหม); some sources equate the name to the Ta Prohm temple known today.) Some 2,000 labourers were conscripted for the project, which was terminated after a band of local Khmers emerged from the jungle to attack the party and murdered the Siam-employed officials overseeing the work. Later, in 1867, Mongkut would commission a different representation of Angkor in Bangkok, and had a scale model of Angkor Wat built in the royal temple of Wat Phra Kaew in the Grand Palace instead.

Despite its location in Siam, the French were able to secure permission for exploration and study of Angkor's sites, and developed Angkorian art and architecture into a symbol of Cambodian national identity. These seemingly academic undertakings also served political purposes, helping to strengthen France's colonial agenda and further the argument for the region to be returned to Cambodia.

As colonial pressure increased towards the end of the century, King Chulalongkorn (Rama V) implemented centralizing reforms and introduced the Monthon Thesaphiban administration system to bring Siam's fringe towns and cities (mueang) and tributaries under Bangkok's direct control, effectively annexing them into Thai territory in line with the Western concept of territorial sovereignty. Inner Cambodia, now comprising the mueang of Phra Tabong, Siemmarat, Si Sophon and Phanom Sok (Note: พนมศก) (Phnom Srok), was established as Monthon Khamen (Note: มณฑลเขมร 'Monthon Khmer') in 1891. Phraya Maha-ammattayathibbodi (Run Siphen) was posted as commissioner to the new monthon, based in Si Sophon.

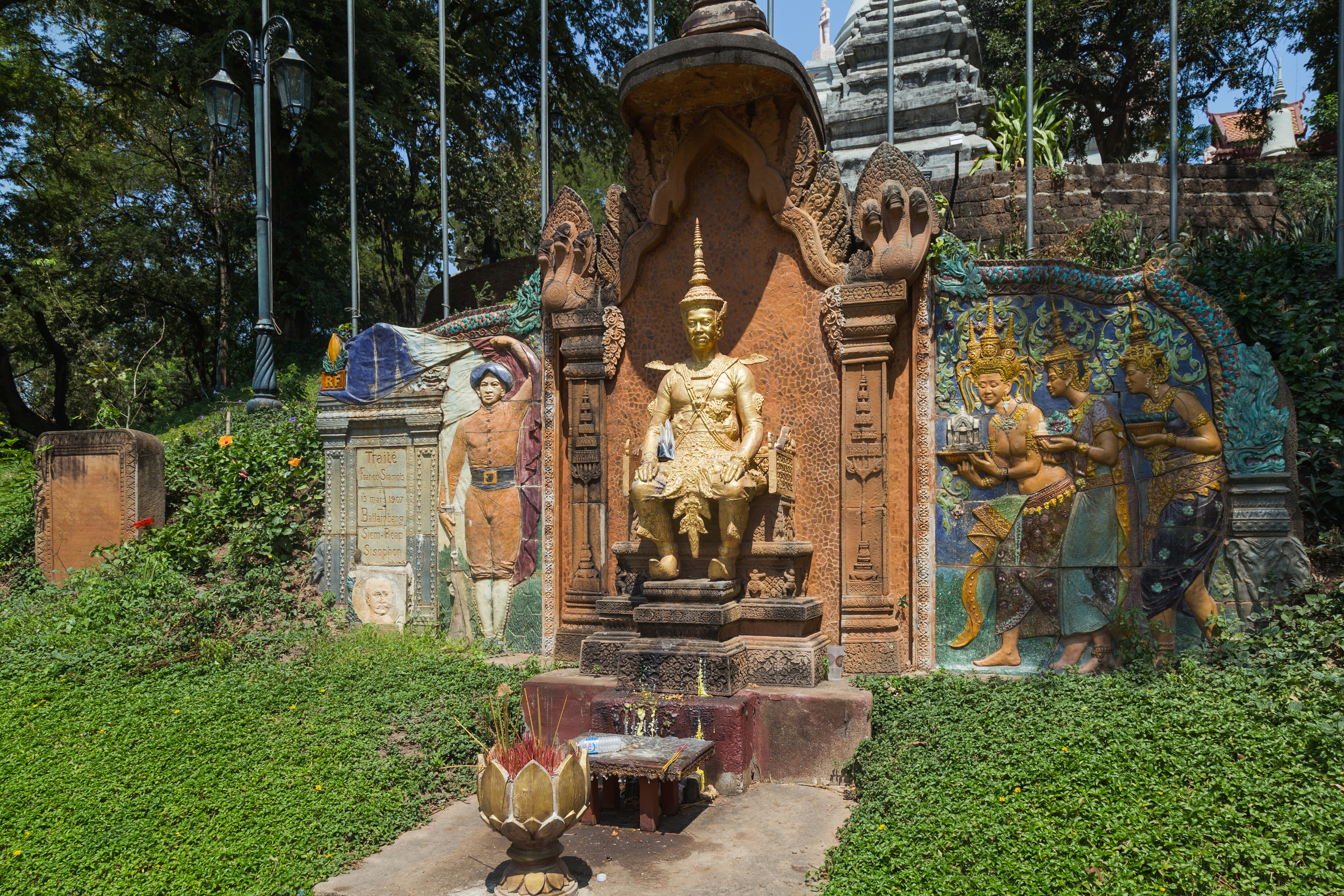
The return of Battambang, Siem Reap and Sisophon was celebrated by the French, who created a monument of King Sisowath dedicated to the treaty at Wat Phnom.

However, the conflict with France soon erupted into the Franco-Siamese crisis of 1893, which resulted in Siam being forced to cede extensive territory to France. Inner Cambodia remained under Siam's control, though the Franco-Siamese treaty of 1893 demanded that Siam demilitarize the area. With the Thai government's wariness over further French designs, little effort was made to support development and fully implement reforms in the region, which was renamed to Monthon Tawan-ok (Note: มณฑลตะวันออก) in 1899 and Monthon Burapha (both meaning 'east monthon') in 1900.

The situation continued until the Franco-Siamese treaty of 1907 was concluded, with Siam ceding control of the remaining area of Inner Cambodia to France in exchange of the towns of Trat and Dan Sai, which had been under French occupation since 1904, as well as the ending of French extraterritoriality over Asian subjects. The last governor of Battambang under Siamese rule, Chum Abhayavongsa, relocated to Prachin Buri, where he commissioned the construction of the Chao Phraya Aphaiphubet Building, regarded as a sister building of the Governor's Residence in Battambang, which he had also commissioned just prior to the handover. Both buildings now serve as museums.

== World War II ==
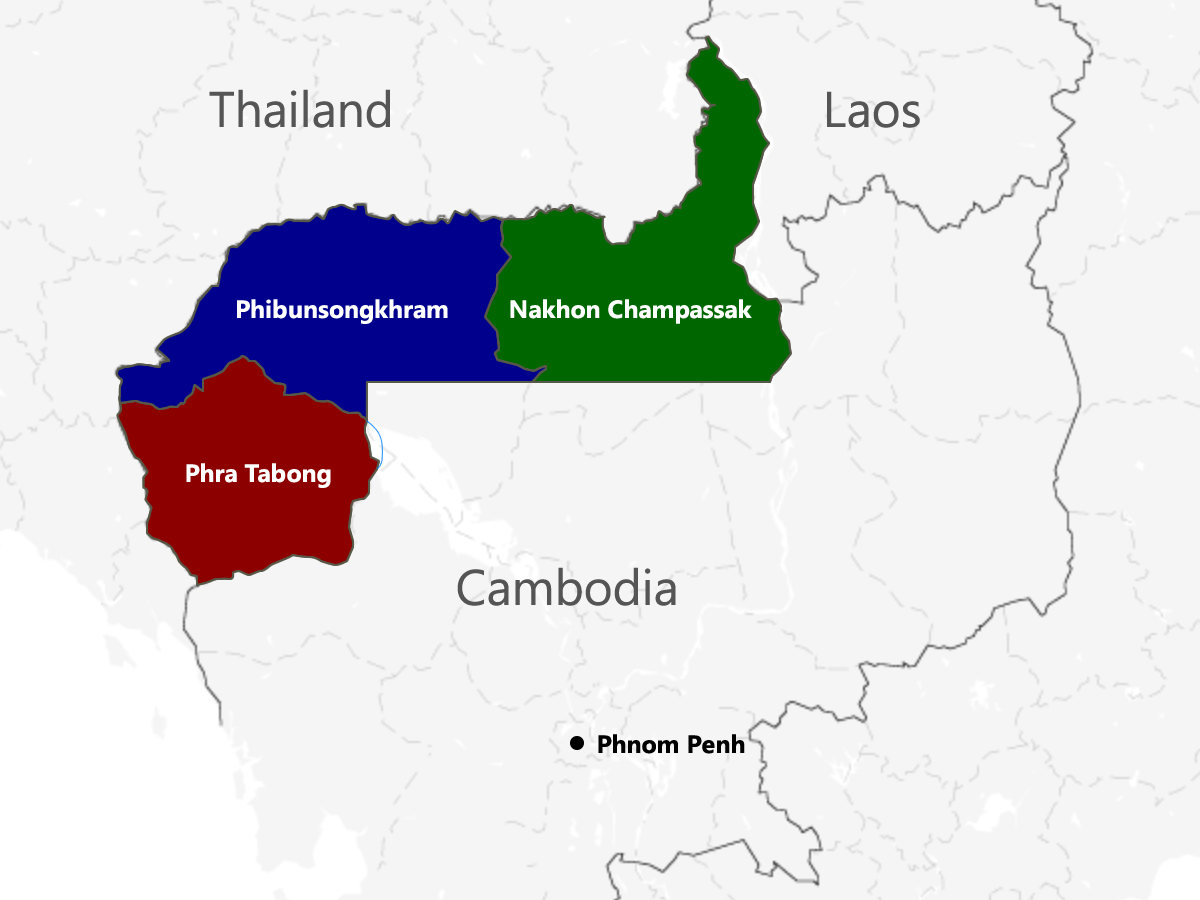
Provinces of Cambodia and southern Laos annexed by Thailand during the Franco-Thai War in 1941

In the prelude to the Pacific theater of World War II, the nationalist government of Thai Prime Minister Plaek Phibunsongkhram invaded French Indochina in 1940 to pursue its irredentist pan-Thai ideology and reclaim what it regarded as Thailand's lost territories. The war concluded in 1941 with an armistice negotiated by Japan, in which France ceded the areas around Battambang and Siem Reap (north and west of Angkor), which were incorporated as the Thai territories of Phra Tabong province and Phibunsongkhram province, respectively, as well as those now part of Preah Vihear province and Laos' Champasak province (becoming Nakhon Champasak province) and Sainyabuli province (which became Lan Chang province).

Following Japan's defeat, Thailand relinquished these claims and returned the territories in 1946 as a condition for its admission into the United Nations.

== See also ==
- Cambodia–Thailand relations
