= Territorial losses of Thailand =

Concept in Thai historiography

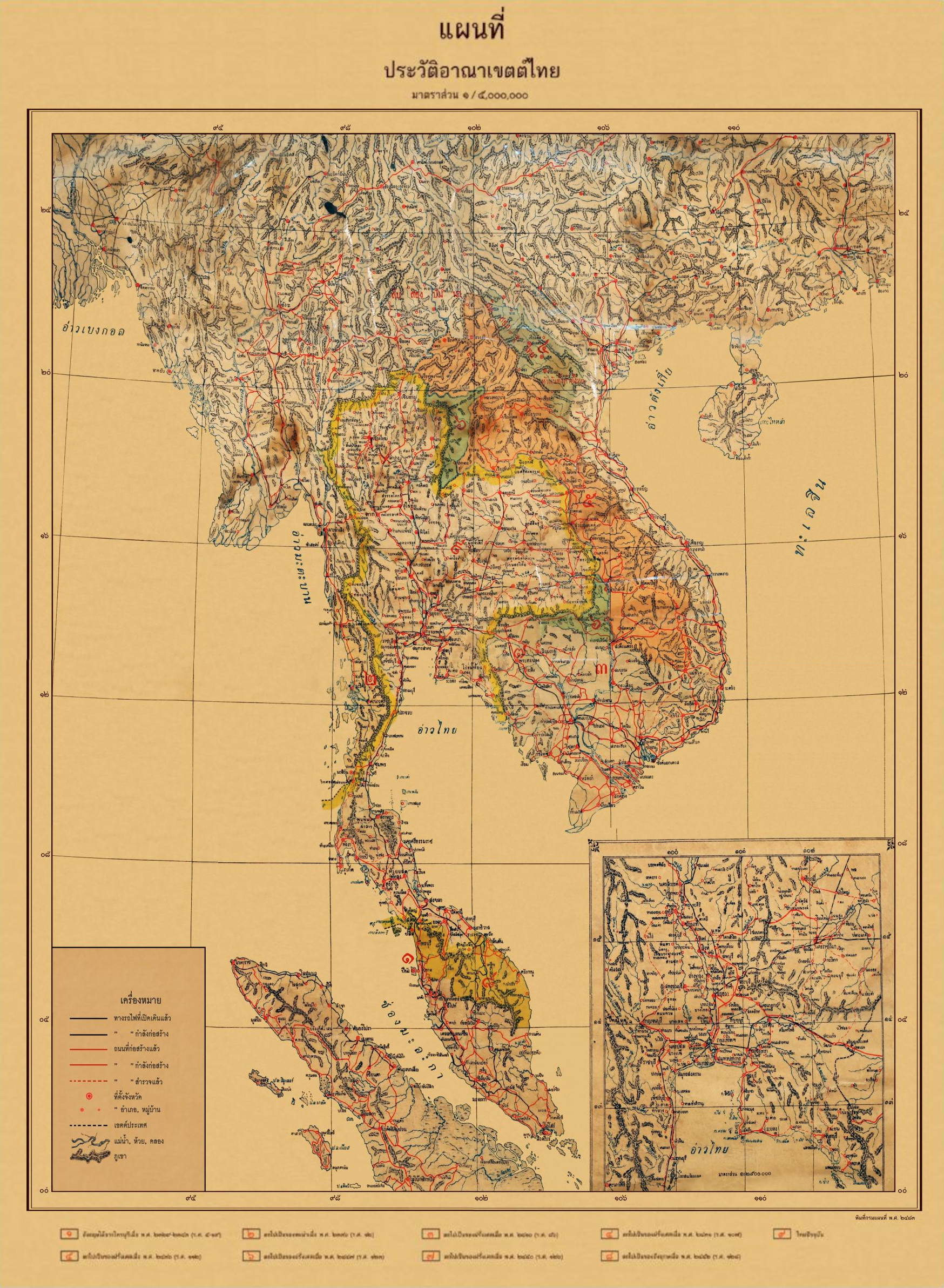
Coloured version of the Map of the History of Thailand's Boundary, published 1940 by the Royal Survey Department

The territorial losses of Thailand is a concept in Thai historiography, referring to conflicts during the Rattanakosin period of Thailand (or Siam as it was historically known) where the country was forced to cede territory, especially to the Western powers of France and Great Britain during the reign of King Chulalongkorn (Rama V, 1868–1910).

The concept was popularized in the 1930s as part of the Thai nationalism promoted by the government of Plaek Phibunsongkhram. The idea was propagated through sets of maps, titled the Historical Atlas of Thailand and Map of the History of Thailand's Boundary, that claimed to depict the historical extent of the boundaries of Thailand's predecessor states and the territories it subsequently lost. The maps have been widely disseminated, especially through their inclusion in Thongbai Taengnoi's student atlas, a standard textbook used in Thai schools since 1963.

While later historians have disputed the maps' historical accuracy, the concept remains a mainstay in Thai nationalist discourse, and has re-emerged especially during episodes of the Cambodian–Thai border dispute.

== Origins ==
The concept of Thailand's territorial losses was first popularized in the 1930s as part of the anti-Western Thai nationalist ideology promoted by the government of Plaek Phibunsongkhram (Phibun). The loss of territories was leveraged as a theme in "national humiliation discourse"—as termed by historian Shane Strate—which was employed to bolster support for the government and its irredentist ideology of Pan-Thaiism.

The idea was publicized through a set of maps titled the Historical Atlas of Thailand and another map called the Map of the History of Thailand's Boundary. The Historical Atlas is a set of six maps, the first depicting the southward movement of Tai/Thai people from the Altai Mountains, (as was a popular theory at the time) and the others depicting the territories of the Thai kingdoms of Nanzhao (considered so under said theory), Sukhothai during the reign of King Ram Khamhaeng, Ayutthaya during Naresuan's, Thonburi during Taksin's and Rattanakosin during Rama I's.

The History of Thailand's Boundary is a single map, labelling territories lost by Thailand over several occasions, resulting in the country's present-day shape. Several versions of the map exist, with differing accounting of the losses, but all include the cession of territory that is now Laos and Cambodia to the French in 1893, 1904 and 1907, and of the four Malay states to the British in 1909.

The Historical Atlas of Thailand series (six plates, left) and Map of the History of Thailand's Boundary (right), in the most widely recognized version depicted in Thongbai Taengnoi's atlas

== Publication history ==
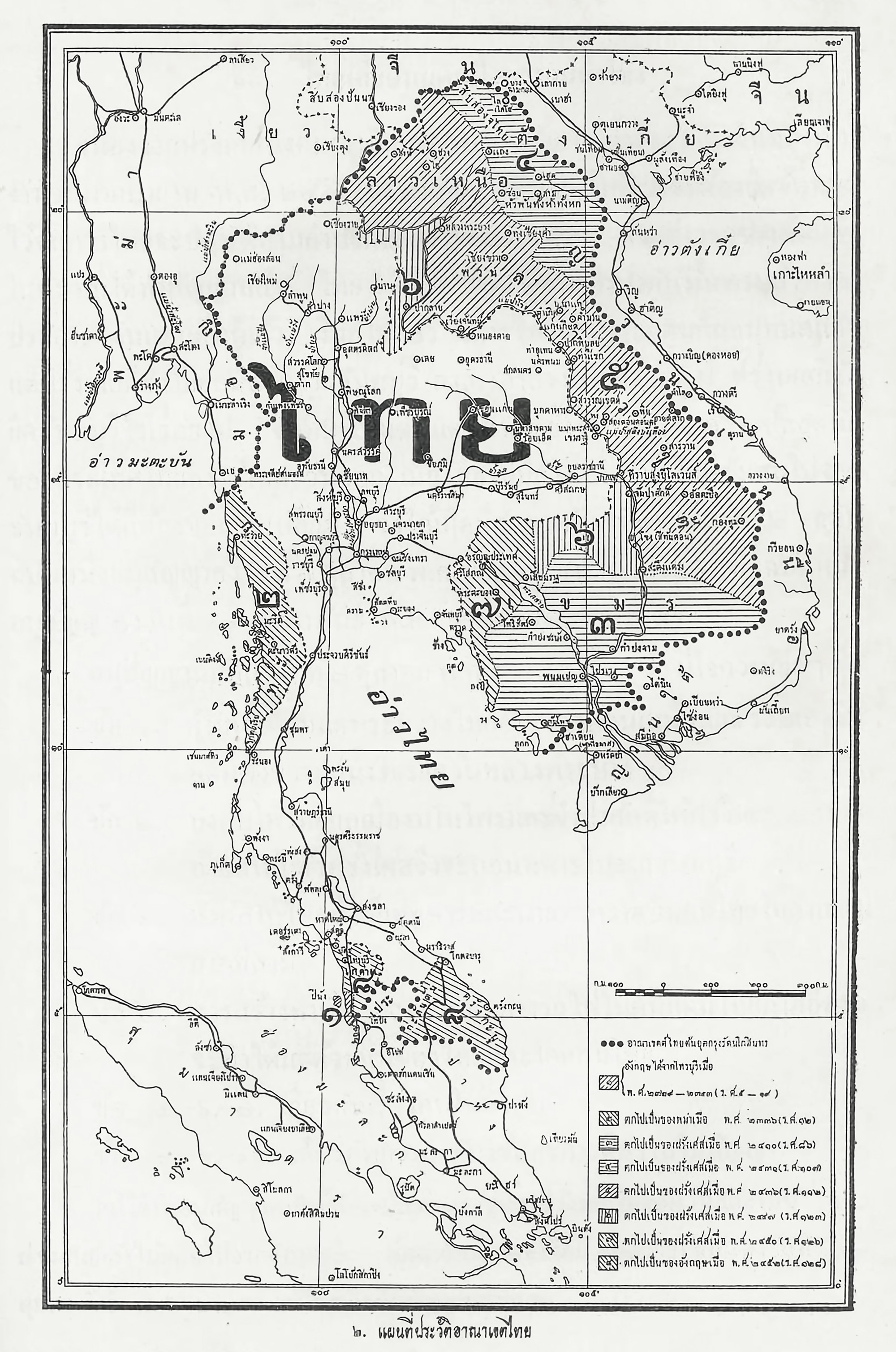
The widely circulated History of Thailand's Boundary map, which was used to spread the Pan-Thaiist ideology in 1940

The Historical Atlas set of maps was first published by the Royal Thai Survey Department around 1935–1936. The History of Thailand's Boundary map (also referred to as Evolution of the Boundary of Thailand) was also first produced in 1935, though it was a different version that rose to prominence in 1940, amid the spread of the Pan-Thaiist ideology supported by Phibun's government, with calls for the return of territory ceded to the French in 1904 and 1907. The map was distributed to schools and government offices, prompting protests from British and French diplomats. The government distanced itself from the publication, but its distribution was then taken up by one of Phibun's aides.

The movement gained widespread public support, and Thailand under the Phibun government invaded French Indochina in 1940 to reclaim the lost territories. Thailand briefly annexed some of the territories thanks to its alliance with Japan during World War II, but had to renounce the claims after the war. Despite the changed political climate, the maps continued to live on thanks to their adaptation into school material.

In 1957, Phunphon Atsanachinda, a former Royal Survey Department officer and professor at Chiang Mai University, produced a similar set of maps (including the six Historical Atlas maps and the boundary history map) for Thai Watana Panich, one of the largest publishers of school textbooks, titled Bandai Prawattisat Thai Tae Boran (บันไดประวัติศาสตร์ไทยแต่โบราณ, 'the steps of Thai history since antiquity'). It was sold as sets of posters, and became widely distributed among schools.

In 1963, another version of the set was included in a student atlas illustrated by Thongbai Taengnoi, a school headteacher from Prachin Buri. Thongbai's atlas, also published by Thai Watana Panich, became an extremely popular textbook and was widely used by schools all over the country into the 21st century, with its 44th printing in 2014. Most Thai people have since become acquainted with the maps through its use in Thongbai's atlas.

Several other versions of the maps, especially the History of Thailand's Boundary, have also been produced, some by historians discussing the historical issues, others by organizations or groups using them for political purposes, especially those surrounding territorial disputes with Cambodia. Following the attack of the Thai embassy in the 2003 Phnom Penh riots, the Survey Department released a new Map of Siam's Territorial Losses, which claimed thirteen losses as opposed to the around eight usually depicted in earlier maps. After the flare-up of the Preah Vihear dispute in 2008, a widely circulated anonymous online video featured another version with up to fourteen losses.

== Issues ==
The maps are not factually accurate. The Historical Atlas systematically overstates the extent of territories under Siam's control, and selectively depicts only time points of greatest territorial extent, ignoring the ebbs and flows in between. The representations are also anachronistic, as the concept of geographical territories was not recognized in those times, and does not reflect the mandala tributary system of the region. The depiction of the Altai Mountains origin theory suggests that the Historical Atlas was strongly influenced by Khun Wichitmatra's book Lak Thai, a popular account which became adopted into mid-20th century conventional historiography. The theory it is based on—that Nanzhao was a Tai state—has been widely discredited by historians since the 1980s, though it continues to be reproduced in Thongbai's atlas.

Likewise, the boundary history map provides no basis for the claims it makes of areas historically belonging to Siam, and creates an illusion that the country had a distinct geographical shape before the loss of those territories, while in reality those boundaries had never been clearly demarcated.

Later historians, beginning with Thongchai Winichakul in 1994, have viewed the maps as a political tool, used to strengthen the Thai nationalist view of history. According to Thongchai, they are "not for a study of historical geography, but for historical consciousness about the life of the nation". Charnvit Kasetsiri has mentioned Thongbai's atlas as an example of how outdated concepts are still perpetuated by school textbooks, allowing nationalist sentiments to be stoked up by political groups.

The concept remains a mainstay in Thai nationalist discourse, and has re-emerged especially along with the Preah Vihear dispute, which itself has become regarded as one of the losses in the recent versions of the map and list that proliferated in the 21st century.

== Comparison of claimed territorial losses ==
Date	Area	Lost to	Result of	RTSD 1940 (Note: Royal Thai Survey Department, Map of the History of Thailand's Boundary (Phaenthi Prawat Anakhet Thai, แผนที่ประวัติอาณาเขตต์ไทย), image)	Phunphon 1957 (Note: Phunphon Atsanachinda, Bandai Prawattisat Thai Tae Boran (บันไดประวัติศาสตร์ไทยแต่โบราณ 'the steps of Thai history since antiquity'))	Thongbai 1963 (Note: Thongbai Taengnoi's student atlas)	Wyatt 1984 (Note: David K. Wyatt, Thailand: A Short History)	RTSD 2003 (Note: Royal Thai Survey Department, Phaenthi Sadaeng Kan Sia Dindaen Khong Siam, แผนที่แสดงการเสียดินแดนของสยาม 'map showing the territorial losses of Siam')	Anon 2008 (Note: Anonymous online video. Items appear undated.)	CRMA 2013 (Note: Chulachomklao Royal Military Academy, Phaenthi Sadaeng Kan Sia Dindaen Khong Thai Sip Si Khrang แผนที่แสดงการเสียดินแดนของไทย ๑๔ ครั้ง 'map showing the 14 territorial losses of Thailand')
1786–1800	Penang Island	Britain	Lost to the East India Company by the Sultan of Kedah	1	No	1	1	2 (Note: Date listed as 1826.)	1	1
1793	Tenasserim coast	Burma	Burmese–Siamese War (1792–1794)	2	Yes (Note: Date listed as 1825.)	2	No	1 (Note: Date listed as 1791, with the cities breaking off allegiance before the war.)	2	2
1810	Hà Tiên	Vietnam		No	No	No	No	No	3	3
1816	Hsenwi	Burma		No	No	No	Yes (Note: Boundary lines included but unlabelled.)	3	4 (Note: Includes Kengtung and most of the Shan States.)	4
1826	Perak (and Selangor)	Britain		No	No	No	No	4	5	5
1850	Sipsong Panna	China		No	No	No	Yes	5	6	6 (Note: Date listed as 1854.)
1867	Outer Cambodia	France	Franco-Siamese treaty of 1867 recognizing the French Protectorate of Cambodia, in exchange of Siamese rule over Inner Cambodia	3	Yes	3	2	6	7	7
1888	Sip Song Chau Tai	France	Colonized by France	4	Yes	4	3	No	8	8
1892	Left (east) bank of the Salween	Britain		No	No	No	No	8 (Note: Date listed as 1894.)	9	9
1893	Left (east) bank of the Mekong (most of Laos)	France	Franco-Siamese crisis, Pak Nam Incident, and treaty of 1893	5	Yes	5	4	7	10	10
1895	Pahang	Britain		No	No	No	No	9	No	No
1904	Right (west) bank of the Mekong	France	Franco-Siamese treaty of 1904, in exchange of Chanthaburi, which had been occupied since 1893	6	Yes	6	5	10	11	11
1907	Inner Cambodia (Battambang, Siem Reap and Serei Saophoan)	France	Franco-Siamese treaty of 1907, in exchange of Trat, Dan Sai, and ending French extraterritoriality over Asian subjects	7	Yes	7	6	11	12	12
1909	Kedah, Perlis, Kelantan and Terengganu	Britain	Anglo-Siamese treaty of 1909, in exchange of ending British extraterritoriality over Asian subjects and a loan for the construction of a railway line to Malaya	8	Yes	8	7	12	13	13
1962	Preah Vihear	Cambodia	ICJ ruling of the Temple of Preah Vihear case	—N/a	—N/a	—N/a	No	13	14	14

== See also ==
- Century of humiliation, a similar application in Chinese historiography
- Italian irredentism
- Revanchism
