= British Club =

British Club may refer to:

- British Club (Bangkok), a social club in Thailand
- British Club (football), a football club in Mexico

== See also ==
- Gentlemen's club, a type of social club originally set up by men from Britain's upper classes, of which many in the British colonies bore the name British Club
- List of football clubs in the United Kingdom
