= Phloen Chit (disambiguation) =

Phloen Chit or Ploenchit (Thai: เพลินจิต) is the name of a road, an intersection and its neighbourhood in Bangkok. The name may also refer to:

- Phloen Chit BTS Station
- Ploenchit Fair, a fund-raising fair for charity projects throughout the Kingdom of Thailand

== See also ==
- Sor Ploenchit
