= The Siam Observer =

First English-language newspaper in Thailand (1893–1933)

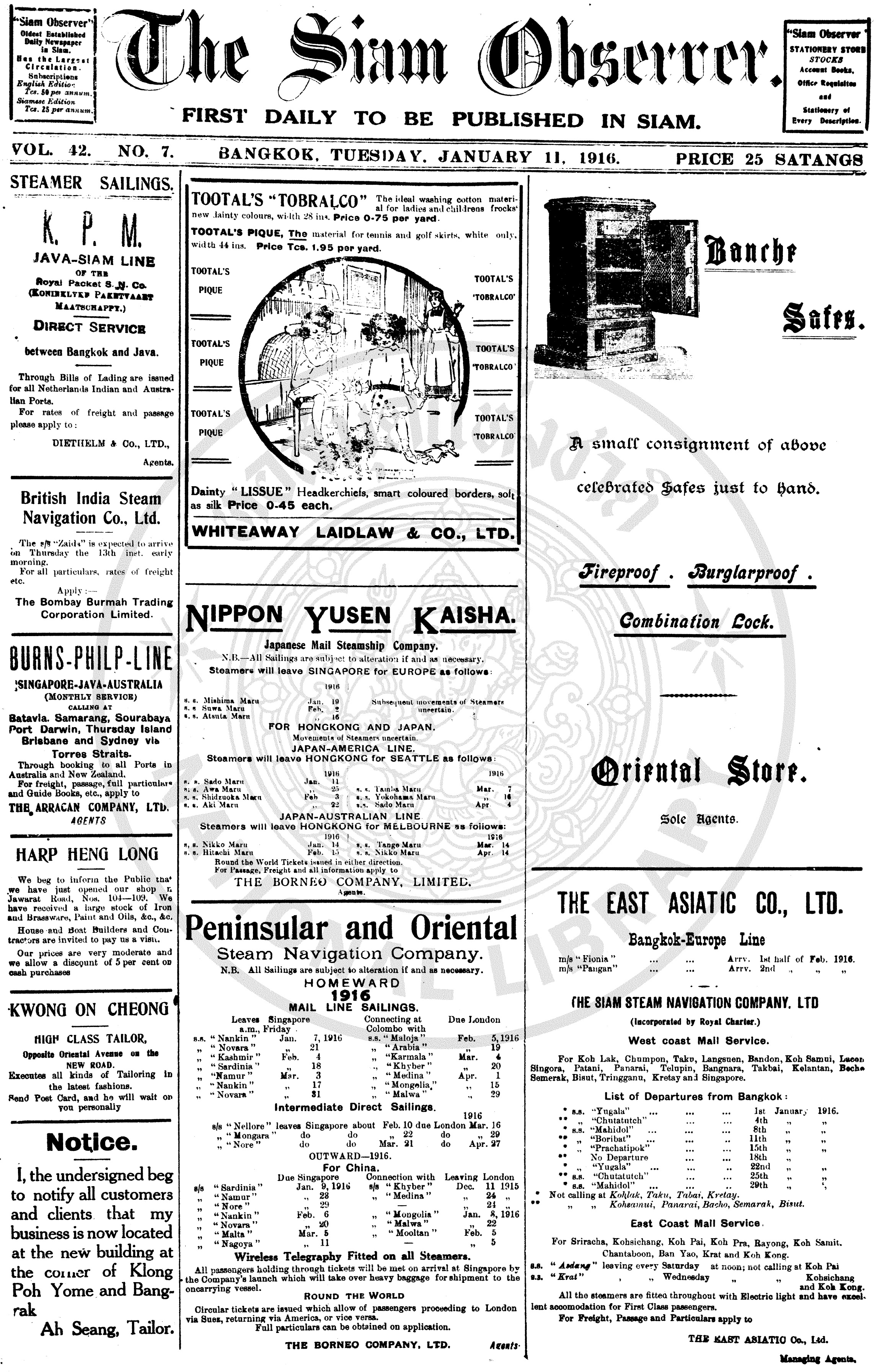
- 11 January 1916 issue of The Siam Observer
- Type: Daily (except Sunday) newspaper
- Founded: 1 August 1893
- Ceased publication: 1933
- Language: English
- Headquarters: Bangkok, Thailand

The Siam Observer was the first English-language daily newspaper in Thailand when it was published on 1 August 1893 . It was founded by Mr. W. A. G. Tilleke and Mr. G. W. Ward. As of January 1906 and May 1918, its offices were located on the Oriental Avenue. It ceased publication in early 1933 due to financial reasons.

A weekly edition entitled The Siam Weekly Mail for subscribers abroad was also published.

== See also ==
- Timeline of English-language newspapers published in Thailand
- List of online newspaper archives - Thailand
