= Victor Jaques =

British Army officer

- Jaques in British Army Second World War uniform
- Born: 31 December 1896
- Died: November 1955 (aged 58)
- Military career
- Allegiance: United Kingdom
- Branch: British Army
- Rank: Brigadier
- Service number: 131287
- Unit: Royal Sussex Regiment
- Conflicts: First World War; Second World War
- Awards: Commander of the Order of the British Empire; Distinguished Service Order; Military Cross and bar

Brigadier Victor Henry Jaques (sometimes Jacques) CBE DSO MC & Bar (31 December 1896 – November 1955) was a British Army officer. He served during the First World War before becoming a lawyer in Bangkok, Siam, with Tilleke & Gibbins. During the Second World War Jaques rejoined the army. In 1945 he was posted as the representative of Force 136, a British intelligence unit, in Bangkok. One of his key roles was to liaise with the Thai official Pridi Banomyong. The Thai government was technically at war with the Allies, but Pridi was also a leader of the anti-Japanese Free Thai Movement, and Jaques worked to co-ordinate Allied operations with the movement and to plan for future relations. Jaques was hindered by Pridi's distrust of British plans for South-east Asia in the post-war period, as well as various diplomatic incidents. Pridi instead favoured closer relations with the Americans. Jaques remained in Bangkok after the war, both as an army officer and as a civilian lawyer. He played a key role in re-founding the city's British Club in 1947.

== Early life and career ==
The records of the British Club note that Jaques was born on 31 December 1896, and attended Thame School in Oxfordshire. They also state that he joined the British Army in 1914, during the First World War. The London Gazette records that he received training in the Officers' Training Corps prior to receiving a probationary commission as a second lieutenant on 16 May 1915 in the 3rd (Special Reserve) battalion of the Royal Sussex Regiment. His probationary period ended on 7 June 1916. Jaques was promoted to the acting rank of captain on 10 December 1916 and to the substantive rank of lieutenant on 1 July 1917. On 15 October 1918, Jaques received the Military Cross "for conspicuous gallantry and dash during a raid on enemy trenches". The medal citation commends his organisation and leadership of the raid, after which he led a patrol to search no man's land for three snipers while under machine gun and trench mortar fire.

Jaques relinquished his acting rank on 21 December 1918 but was appointed again to that rank and command of a company on 7 January 1919. Jaques received a bar to his Military Cross on 15 February 1919 for actions in an attack on a German position north of the Ormignon River on 18 September 1918, during the Hundred Days Offensive. The medal citation notes that Jaques "handled his company throughout with conspicuous ability and displayed great gallantry". Once his unit had reached its final objective, he reorganised his company, as well as, under heavy machine gun fire, platoons in other companies that had lost their officers. He afterwards volunteered to lead two of these platoons forwards to exploit an opportunity and was wounded in action. By February 1919 Jaques was attached to the 2nd (Regular) battalion of his regiment. He served as an aide-de-camp between 4 April and 3 November 1919. Jaques left the army on 1 April 1920, being promoted to the substantive rank of captain.

Jaques became a lawyer, being called to the bar of the Inner Temple in 1924 and leaving for Siam in 1925, where he joined the practice of Tilleke & Gibbins in Bangkok. He served for more than a decade as general counsel to the Siam Electricity Company (renamed the Thai Electric Company in 1939). Jaques learnt to speak the Thai language fluently. Jaques returned to the United Kingdom once, in 1930, to marry Dora Watson. The firm carried out work for the Thai royal family and various government agencies. In 1935 Jaques acted as defence counsel for Phraya Thephatsadin, which led to him being associated with the Thai royalist cause.

== Second World War ==
With the coming of World War II, Jaques left Siam in 1940 to rejoin the army and, on 26 May, received a commission as a lieutenant in his old regiment. He fought with his old regiment in Italy, India and Burma. By 11 January 1945, when he was mentioned in dispatches for his service in Italy, he had been promoted to the substantive rank of major and the temporary rank of lieutenant colonel. Jaques was appointed an Officer of the Order of the British Empire on 19 April 1945 for his service in Italy; by this time he held the acting rank of colonel.

=== Thailand ===
By early 1945 Jaques had been selected by Force 136, the Far East branch of the undercover Special Operations Executive (SOE), as their representative in Japanese-occupied Thailand (Siam had been renamed in 1939). SOE officer Andrew Gilchrist notes in his memoir that he was asked whether the job might be too demanding for Jaques. He replied "Nuts. I know Jacques, he's mad enough for anything. If he's offer this job he'll take it. There's only one thing ... is he fit enough? I believe he's got a game leg—a wound from the last war". Force 136 decided that Jaques would be selected, though his injury ruled him out of any parachute drops and meant he would be transferred in and out of the country by sea plane.

Jaques's role was to discuss future operations and post-war relations with Pridi Banomyong, an official of the Thai government. Thailand was technically at war with the Allies, but Pridi was also a leader of the anti-Japanese Free Thai Movement. Jaques, codenamed Brigadier Hector, entered Thailand in Operation Panicle on the night of 27/28 April 1945. Jaques arrived in Bangkok in the company of Tan Chin (Prince Subha Svasti, a rival of Pridi, who had been permitted to return by Pridi's pardoning of political exiles), who had been sent by insistence of the British government. Force 136 had opposed the sending of Subha as it thought the presence of the unpopular royalist would harm relations with the Free Thai Movement. Upon arrival in Thailand Force 136 quickly posted Subha as liaison officer to a remote post on the Burmese border.

There were delays in getting Jaques into Thailand, which meant that the American intelligence service—the Office of Strategic Services—already had a mission to Pridi in place, giving them a distinct advantage. Despite the presence of Japanese forces and the official position of Thailand as an enemy state, Allied intelligence agents were able to travel fairly freely across the country, in full uniform, because of the support of the Free Thai Movement. Jaques, particularly conspicuous by his 6 feet 4 inches (1.93 m) height, found he was able to travel across Bangkok openly wearing his British Army uniform.

Jaques lodged in a house directly across the Chao Phraya River from Pridi's residence. He met with Pridi on 30 April, on a boat that cruised up and down the river to escape Japanese intelligence. Jaques secured an agreement from Pridi that a post-war Thai government would renounce claims on British territories annexed to Thailand by the Japanese. Pridi raised concerns over a Force 136 unit that had been parachuted into the Shan Hills without his permission. Jaques reassured him that the unit was acting only to cut off the Japanese retreat from Burma and had no interest in Thailand. Pridi also sought assurances over post-war Anglo-Thai relations, but Jaques was not authorised to promise anything in this regard. His silence made Pridi suspicious of post-war British intentions in Thailand, and led him to favour closer relations with the Americans.

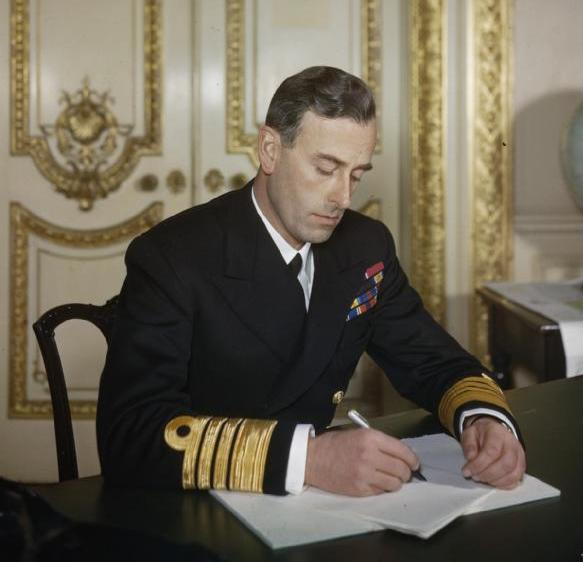
Mountbatten

Jaques left Thailand on 2 May, returning to India with a number of Thai liaison officers. Whilst there, Jaques campaigned for closer co-operation between Force 136 and the OSS in Thai relations. He was supported in this by the OSS agent Waller B. Booth, who proposed to install Jaques as the head of a joint Allied mission to Thailand. However, these plans were scuppered by American suspicion of Britain's post-war intentions to the country. Within a week of arriving in India, Jaques travelled to Ceylon to meet with Admiral Lord Mountbatten, the Supreme Allied Commander for South East Asia. Jaques pressed Mountbatten for military aid to be sent to the Free Thai Movement, to which the admiral agreed in principle. Mountbatten cautioned against any risings by the Thais at this stage, which were unlikely to succeed, owing to their lack of equipment and training, and might provoke a strong Japanese reaction. The British government concurred with this opinion, which some in the OSS thought was political in nature, denying any opportunity for the Thais to participate in their own liberation.

Jaques returned to Thailand by seaplane on 1 June and established a permanent Force 136 headquarters at Thammasat University. He continued his efforts to improve relations with the OSS mission and to press for greater inter-Allied cooperation but faced obstruction from the Americans. As the OSS and Force 136 offices were in opposite sides of the city, Allied personnel were escorted between them, past Japanese patrols, by Thai military police. The Americans and Thais were both frustrated by Mountbatten's insistence that an Allied invasion of Thailand could not be achieved before December and that any uprising would have to be postponed to suit.

Jaques's mission was made more difficult by the British Secret Intelligence Service, whose Inter-Services Liaison Department sent operatives into Thailand to report on Japanese movements without requesting permission from Pridi. Some of the SIS agents were detected by Free Thai units and reported to Pridi, increasing his distrust of the British. Jaques attempted to intervene to ensure the SIS sent no more operatives without permission, and also sought to bring the SIS operatives under his direction to remedy a lack of staff, but was refused. This led to a further breakdown of his relations with Pridi and left the British mission behind the Americans in intelligence work.

Territory (in white) annexed by Thailand from French Indo-China

A further incident that affected Anglo-Thai relations was an article in a British Ceylon newspaper that advocated annexation of the Kra Isthmus by Britain after the war. A clipping of this article was provided to Pridi by the Americans and it was shown by him to Jaques, as an indication of why he distrusted the British. Jaques suspected that the clipping had been provided by the Americans. The incident led the OSS to ask Pridi not to share with the British any information they had supplied unless it also came from another source. Anglo-Thai relations were also affected by the cancellation of a meeting between a Thai liaison officer and Mountbatten. Though he acknowledged the difficulties present in Anglo-Thai relations, Jaques was hopeful that Pridi thought the British might be useful in supporting Thai claims to retain territories annexed from French Indo-China in 1941 and in opposing any southward expansion of China.

At noon on 18 June 1945, the Americans staged an air drop of supplies for the Free Thai Movement in Bangkok as a display of strength. Packages of medical supplies were dropped from three B-24 bombers from an altitude of just 300 feet (91 m). The supplies were collected by the movement and Thai civilians despite attempts by Japanese soldiers to seize them. The action greatly embarrassed the Japanese military who had been unable to prevent the drop, and also helped to demonstrate to Pridi that the Americans were capable of providing greater practical support to the Thais than the British. As part of the demonstration, four P-38 fighters buzzed low over the watching crowd while another five aircraft strafed the Japanese forces. Four Japanese soldiers were killed and five Thai civilians wounded. Jaques was among the crowd and one of the cannon shells struck within 10 feet (3.0 m) of him. In July Jaques was summoned to meet Pridi, who had received news that a British invasion of Phuket had been foiled by Japanese forces; he was concerned that he had not been forewarned. Jaques explained that this was a mistake by the Japanese and that they had actually attacked a British minesweeping force, preparing for Operation Zipper, the anticipated liberation of British Malaya. Jaques left Thailand soon afterwards and was in India at the time of the 6 and 9 August atomic bombings of Hiroshima and Nagasaki.

Jaques returned to Thailand in mid-August, accompanied by officers detailed to help with the rescue of British prisoners of war in the north-east of the country. Jaques continued to meet with Pridi and advised him not to formally renounce the Thai declaration of war on the Allies for fear of antagonising the Japanese. Jaques later horrified Pridi by visiting British internees at Vajiravudh College openly and in full uniform.

Jaques relinquished his commission on 20 May 1946, holding the war substantive rank of lieutenant-colonel and being granted the honorary rank of colonel. On 13 June he was appointed a Commander of the Order of the British Empire for his service on the staff of the Supreme Allied Commander, Southeast Asia (Mountbatten). Jaques received the Distinguished Service Order on 7 November 1946 "in recognition of gallant and distinguished services while engaged in Special Operations in South East Asia".

== Post-war ==
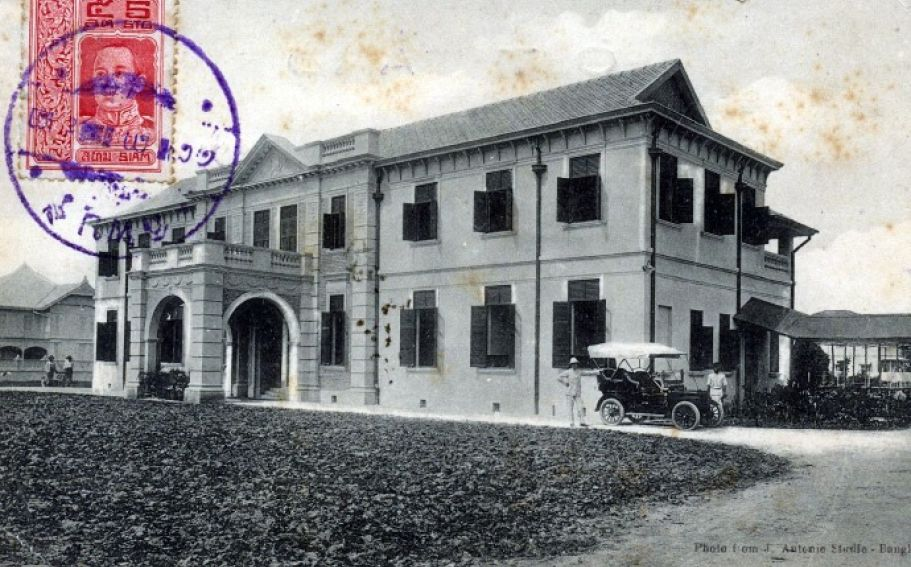
The British Club, pictured in 1912

In the immediate post-war period, Jaques served as political advisor to General Geoffrey Charles Evans, who had entered Thailand as the head of Allied forces to supervise the disarming of the Japanese. Jaques was replaced in this role on 7 October by Hugh R. Bird of the Foreign Office, who had been consul in Chiang Mai in the pre-war years.

After the war, Jaques returned to legal practice in Bangkok, being retained by many British firms who were opening offices there. He was one of the first two British lawyers to return to the city. Jaques attempted to reform Bangkok's office working hours, which were set on a British pattern of 10:00 am to 4:00 pm. For around a year Jaques worked from 7:00 am to 1:00 pm, before being obliged to conform to the traditional hours to match those of his clients. He reopened Tilleke & Gibbins in 1946, now its only remaining partner, but retired from the firm the following year. He assigned its trademark business to his secretary Ina Jorgensen, who had safeguarded the firm's interests during the war, and sold the rest of the business to Albert Lyman in 1951.

Jaques also served as director of the Thai Electric Company and the International Rice Company. He helped re-found the city's British Club in 1946 and served as its first post-war chairman. As the club's records were destroyed during the Japanese occupation, Jaques wrote the club's new rulebook largely from memory. He became an honorary member of the British Club in 1951 for his "invaluable and distinguished service". He and his wife, Dora, returned to Britain in 1955 and he died soon afterwards that November.

== Bibliography ==
- Bergin, Bob (December 2011). "OSS and Free Thai Operations in World War II". Studies in Intelligence. 55 (4).
- Bull, Stephen (22 September 2016). Churchill's Army: 1939–1945 The men, machines and organisation. Bloomsbury Publishing. ISBN 978-1-84486-399-0.
- Cheesman, Paul (December 2009). "Past Participle: Auspicium Melioris Ævi" (PDF). Outpost: The official magazine of the British Club Bangkok. Bangkok, Thailand: British Club. p. 17. Archived from the original (PDF) on 12 August 2021.
- Cheesman, Paul (September 2010). "Past Participle: Auspicium Melioris Ævi" (PDF). Outpost: The official magazine of the British Club Bangkok. Bangkok, Thailand: British Club. p. 19. Archived from the original (PDF) on 13 August 2021.
- Cheesman, Paul (30 June 2021). "British Club Bangkok History" (PDF). Bangkok, Thailand: British Club. Archived from the original (PDF) on 11 August 2021.
- Gilchrist, Andrew (1970). Bangkok Top Secret: Being the Experience of a British Officer in the Siam Country Section of Force 136. Hutchinson. ISBN 978-0-09-102360-7.
- Gooch, John (12 November 2012). Decisive Campaigns of the Second World War. Routledge. ISBN 978-1-136-28888-3.
- Hoskin, John (2003). The British Club Centenary, 1903-2003: A Celebration of Anglo-Thai Relations. Mark Standen Publishing Company.
- Jones, Jones Clive (21 May 2019). Clandestine Lives of Colonel David Smiley: Code Name 'Grin'. Edinburgh University Press. ISBN 978-1-4744-4117-9.
- Reynolds, E. Bruce (6 January 2005). Thailand's Secret War: OSS, SOE and the Free Thai Underground during World War II. Cambridge University Press. ISBN 978-1-139-44259-6.
- Smith, Richard Harris (1 August 2005). OSS: The Secret History of America's First Central Intelligence Agency. Rowman & Littlefield. ISBN 978-1-59921-658-4.
- Sparrow, Gerald (1955). Land of the Moonflower. Elek Books.
- Sparrow, Gerald (1958). The Star Sapphires. Jarrolds.
- Stowe, Judith A. (1991). Siam Becomes Thailand: A Story of Intrigue. C. Hurst & Co. Publishers. ISBN 978-1-85065-083-6.
- Thorne, Christopher G. (1985). The Issue of War: States, Societies, and the Far Eastern Conflict of 1941-1945. Oxford University Press. ISBN 978-0-19-520474-2.
- Tourret, Richard (1989). Thailand. Euromoney Publications. ISBN 978-1-870031-78-3.
