= British Club (Bangkok) =

Social club

Coordinates: 13°43′36″N 100°31′25″E

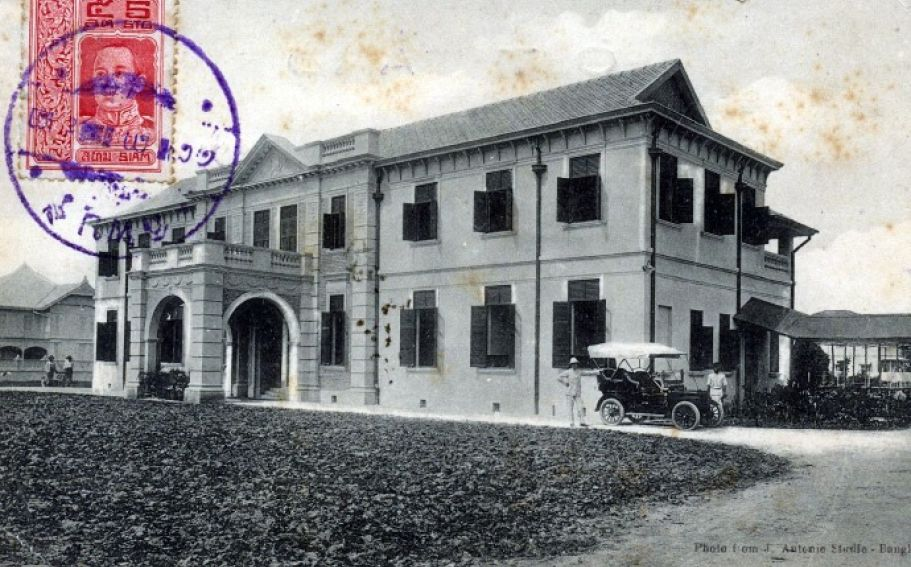
The present-day clubhouse, featured in a postcard from c. 1912

The British Club is an expatriates' social club in Bangkok, Thailand. It was founded as a British gentlemen's club in 1903, and established in its current location on Surawong Road in 1910. The club's operations were disrupted by the Second World War, after which it was re-established. Today, the club features several sporting facilities, as well as dining services and function rooms in the original clubhouse, which has been recognized as an award-winning historic building, and is one of several historic buildings in Bang Rak District.

== History ==
=== Early years ===
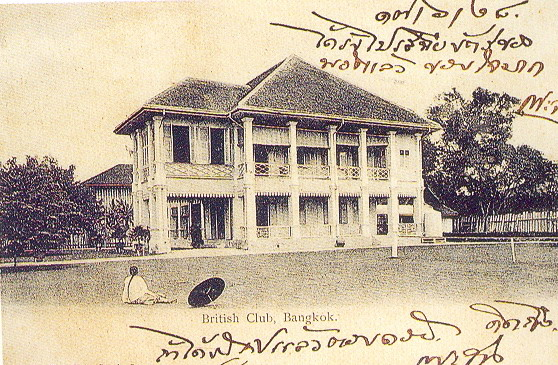
Postcard dated 1909, showing the original clubhouse

The British Club was founded in 1903, when, following a dispute, a group of British members of the United Club—then the main social club for Western expatriates in Bangkok—broke away to form a new, separate club. They formed the first committee on 24 April, and the club opened on 6 July the same year.

The club originally occupied premises on the north side of Surawong Road (then known as Suriwongse), at what is now the corner of Maha Set Road, not far from Surawong's junction with Charoen Krung Road, then the commercial heart of the Bang Rak expatriate neighbourhood. It was a gentlemen's club in the style commonly found across the British Empire (which did not include Siam—as Thailand was then known—though its sphere of influence extended over the country), and admitted as its members directors and senior managers of some British companies and diplomats with the British Legation. Non-British individuals could be elected to become honorary members, and some facilities were open to ladies belonging to members' families.

The club's membership gradually grew, to about 100 members by 1908, prompting plans for relocation to a more expansive site, which was realised, further down the road on the south side, with a purpose-built clubhouse, in 1910. The land was initially rented, until 1914 when ownership was gifted to the club by King Vajiravudh (Rama VI). In 1919, the club acquired the adjacent Bangkok Lawn Tennis Club, previously owned by the Siam Electricity Company, expanding its land footprint to the present day's 8.75 rai (14,000 m^{2}; 3.46 acres).

The club continued to grow throughout the following decades, and it became a major hub of British social life in Bangkok. Activities were mainly centred around the bar, especially at lunchtime on Saturdays. A monthly cinema club was also held. However, operations were disrupted when the Second World War reached Thailand in 1941. On 9 December, Japanese forces, following the country's declaration of war against the British Empire and its invasion of Malaya and Thailand, commandeered the club grounds and detained most of its members. The club's archival documents up until then were all destroyed.

=== Re-establishment ===
Following the war, Victor Jacques, who had been a brigadier in the British Army and returned to Thailand representing the Special Operations Executive, called together previous club members to re-establish the club, and became the first chairman of its new formation. He was able to reclaim club ownership of the premises, which had been erroneously given to the YMCA, as its land deeds had been mortgaged to the Hongkong and Shanghai Bank and survived the war.

The latter half of the twentieth century saw the introduction of new amenities including a swimming pool, squash courts, kitchens, and a fitness centre. The club also saw its membership requirements changing, first in 1975 to accept Australians, New Zealanders and Canadians as full ("ordinary") members and allowing other nationalities to be invited as associate members, then in 1986 to allow women to become members in their own right. The club suffered from loss of members following the 1997 financial crisis, and from increased competition in the 2000s, prompting it to re-orientate its positioning, first (unsuccessfully) in 2006 as a family-friendly establishment, then in 2011 as "the social, sports and cultural centre for the English-speaking community in Bangkok". It launched an annual membership programme in 2010, which was successful in boosting its membership numbers and bolstering its finances. When the British Embassy sold its grounds on Phloen Chit Road in 2019, a war memorial, which had been erected there in 1923, was relocated to the British Club and unveiled on 29 August.

== Location and facilities ==
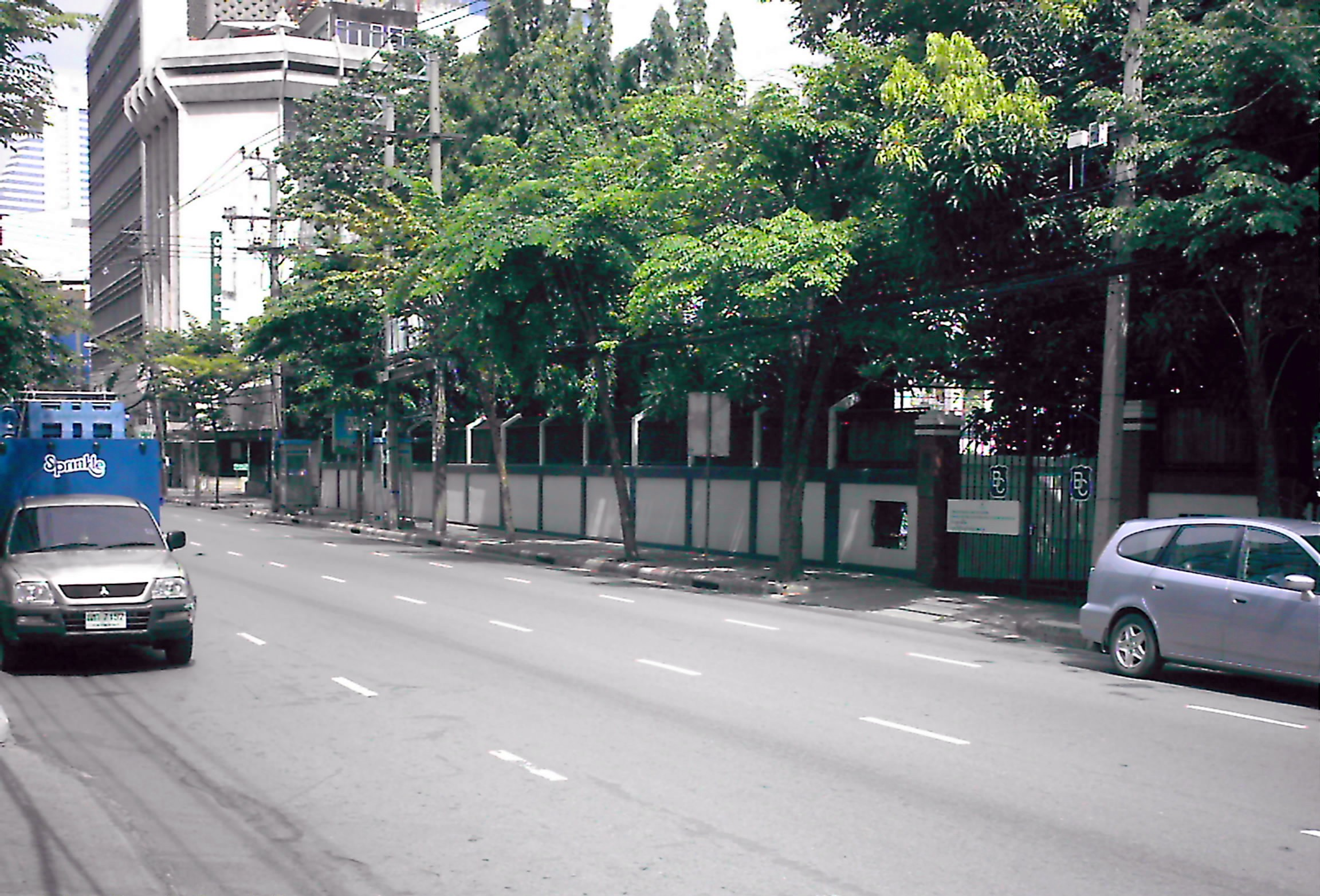
Gates of the club on Surawong Road

The British Club is situated off Surawong Road, with its main entrance served by Soi Si Lom 18, an alleyway branching off the parallel Si Lom Road.

The original clubhouse, which continues to serve as the main building, was built in 1910 to designs by an unknown, probably British, architect. It is a two-storey masonry building, in the Georgian style, with an arched portico entryway and stucco-decorated classical pediment marking the centre of its symmetrical façade. The building was damaged during World War II, requiring extensive repairs, and the interior has been several times renovated. The building received the ASA Architectural Conservation Award in 2006, and is listed as an unregistered ancient monument by the Fine Arts Department. It is among several historic buildings in Bang Rak District, and neighbours the neoclassical Neilson Hays Library.

The club offers sporting facilities, including swimming pools, tennis and squash courts, cricket practice nets, a fitness centre, and a multi-purpose court used for hockey, five-a-side football and indoor-rules cricket. Snooker, pool and darts are available at the indoor bars. The club also features restaurants, lounge areas, and function rooms available for business and social events. There are four restaurants altogether. The Sala is located next to the main pool and overlooking the tennis courts. Upstairs from that is the Jubilee Bar open from 11am with last orders at 11.30pm. There is also Sails next to the kids pool and play area and lastly The Churchill Bar for adults - no kids allowed. As of June 2026, they have updated their menu with a mix of British, Indian and Thai food. There is also a kids area with playground, pool and kids activities on the weekends. It has over 400 reciprocal clubs in 60 countries.

The British Club is closely oriented towards the British community in Thailand, and has ties with several community organizations, who are allowed regular use of the club grounds. The club was one of the original co-organizers of a charity fair, first held at the club in 1948, which was the precursor to the annual Ploenchit Fair, held at the British Embassy since 1957. With the relocation of the war memorial from the embassy in 2019, the club now also serves as the site of the embassy's annual Remembrance Day service.
