= Lekha Aphaiwong =

Thai politician (1913–1983)

- เลขา อภัยวงศ์
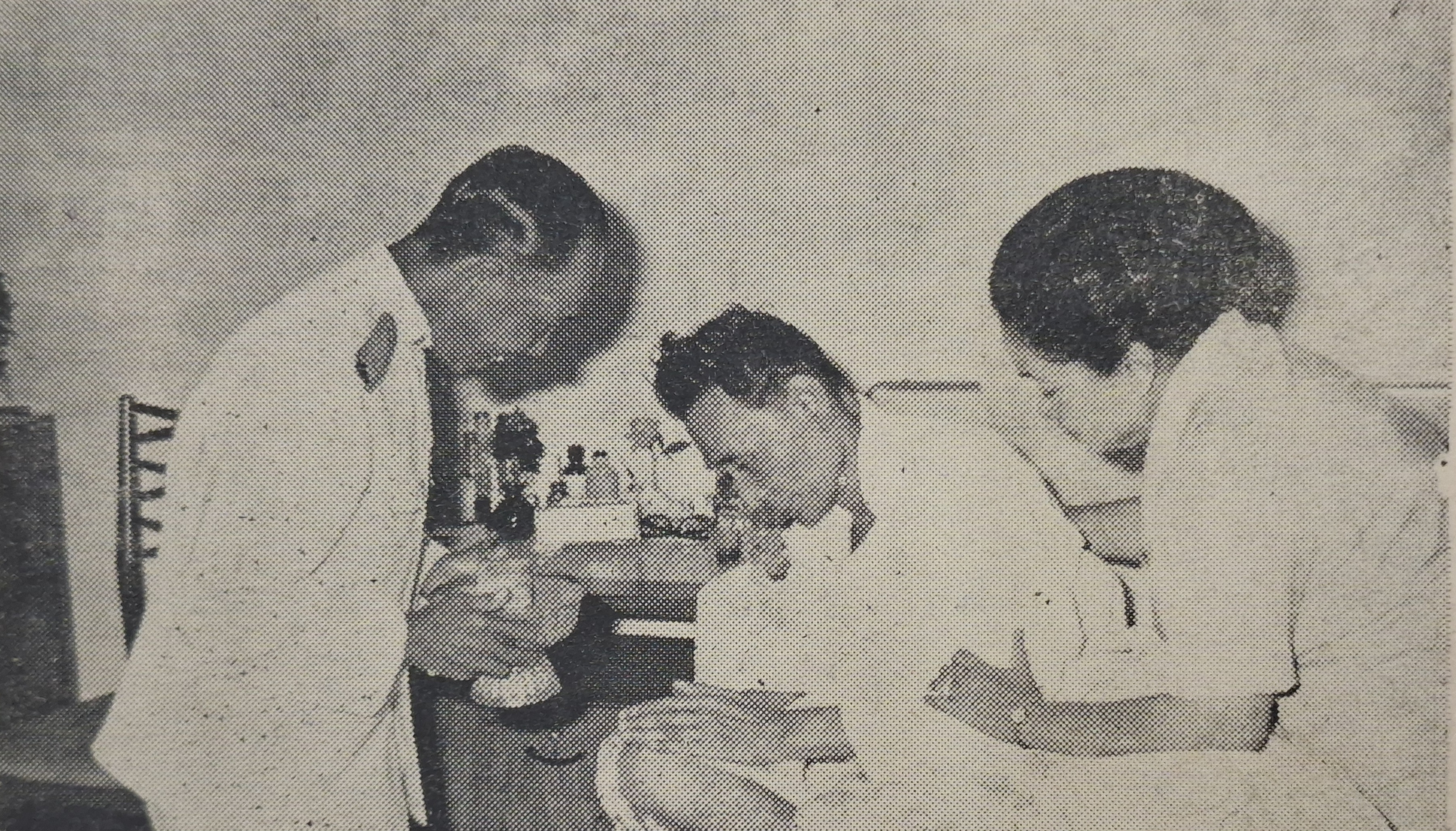

Member of the Senate
- In office 1949–1951

Member of the House of Representatives
- In office 1971

Personal details
- Born: 10 December 1913
- Died: 1983 (aged 69–70)
- Spouse: Khuang Aphaiwong
- Parent: William Alfred Tilleke

Khunying Lekha Aphaiwong (née Kunadilok; Thai: เลขา อภัยวงศ์, 10 December 1913 – 1983) was a Thai politician. In 1949 she was one of the first two women appointed to the Senate, and also later served in the House of Representatives. Her husband Khuang Aphaiwong served three terms as prime minister during the 1940s.

== Biography ==
Aphaiwong was born Jane Lek Kunadilok in 1913, one of twelve children of William Alfred Goone-Tilleke, a Ceylonese-Siamese lawyer. Her mother died when she was very young and she was raised by a nanny and her older sister Yai. After her father died when she was eleven years old, Princess Valaya Alongkorn (daughter of King Chulalongkorn) became her guardian. She was educated at St Joseph Convent, Wang Lang School and Rajini School, after which she studied in Ceylon, England and France. During her time in France she met her future husband Khuang Aphaiwong.

Returning to Thailand, she began teaching at St Mary Mission School, where she worked until marrying Khuang in 1932. During the cultural mandate years she became a member of the Committee to Establish Correct Names, which established and corrected names for gender roles. During this time she changed her name from Lek to Lekha.

In 1949 she and La-iad Phibunsongkhram were appointed to the Senate, becoming the first women to sit in the upper house. Parliament was dissolved by the Silent Coup in 1951. In August 1971 she was elected to the House of Representatives from Bangkok, winning a by-election as a Democrat Party candidate. Parliament was dissolved in November of the same year as a result of the 1971 Thai coup d'état. She later became leader of the People's Sovereignty Party faction within the Democrat Party.

== Honours ==
- Dame Commander (Second Class) of the Most Noble Order of the Crown of Thailand (1962)
- Dame Commander (Second Class, lower grade) of the Most Illustrious Order of Chula Chom Klao (1958)
