= Tilleke & Gibbins =

Southeast Asian law firm

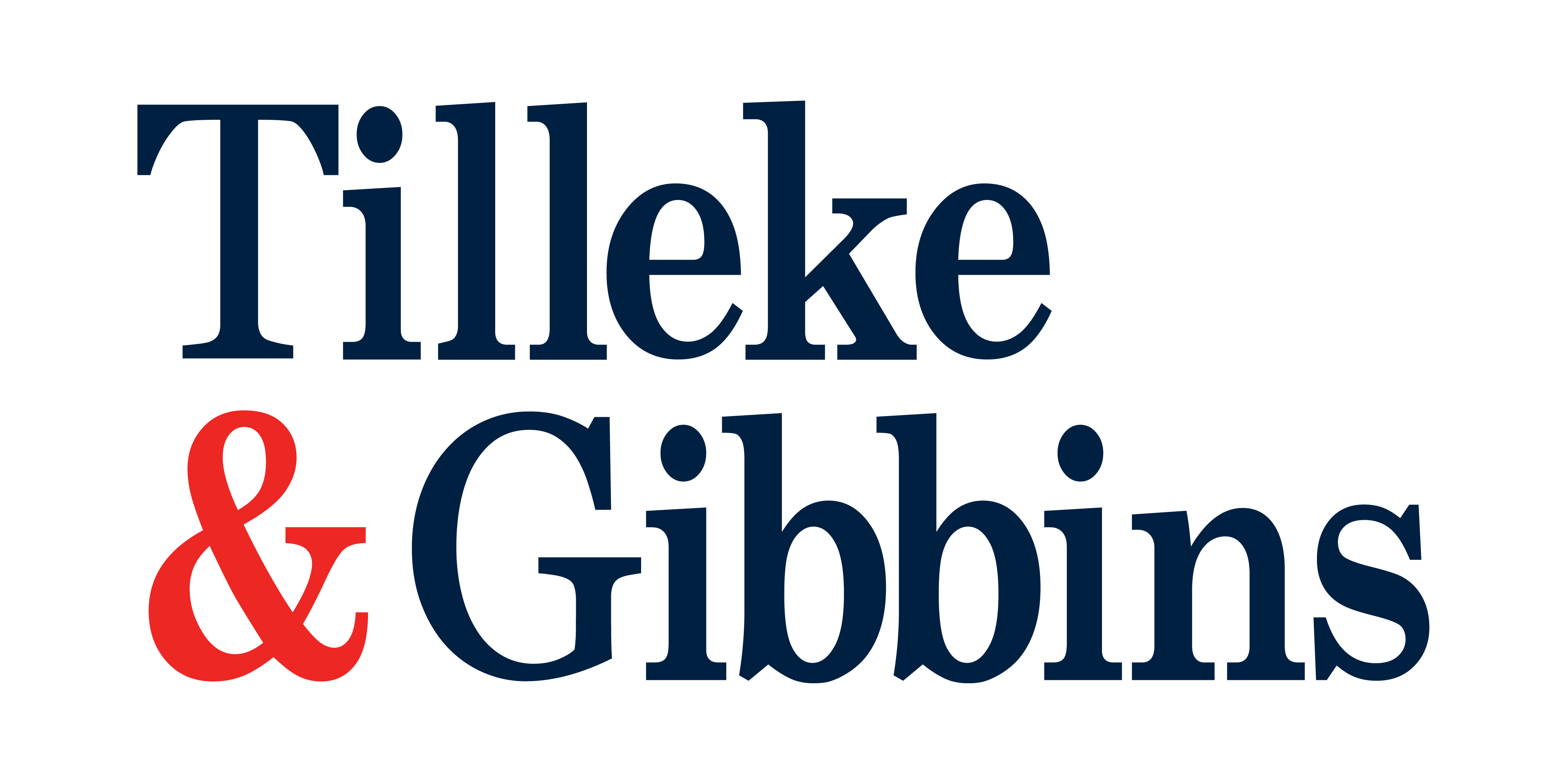
- Headquarters: Bangkok, Thailand
- No. of offices: 7
- No. of attorneys: 230+
- Major practice areas: Banking and Finance, Capital Markets, Competition and Trade, Compliance and Investigations, Corporate/M&A, Dispute Resolution and Litigation, Employment, Intellectual Property, Property, Regulatory Affairs, Tax
- Date founded: 1890
- Website: www.tilleke.com

Tilleke & Gibbins is a regional law firm in Southeast Asia, with offices in Bangkok, Hanoi, Ho Chi Minh City, Jakarta, Vientiane, Phnom Penh, and Yangon. The firm's core practices are commercial transactions, mergers and acquisitions, dispute resolution, litigation, and intellectual property law.

== History ==
In 1890, William Alfred Tilleke, a Ceylonese solicitor, began a new practice in Siam (now Thailand). In 1894, Tilleke gained recognition when he successfully defended Phra Yot Muang Kwang, a Thai provincial governor, who had been accused of murdering a French military officer. In the face of colonial pressure by the French and before a French Court conducted in Thailand, Tilleke exonerated Phra Yot through affirmative evidence and all seven judges presiding returned a "Not Guilty" verdict.

Ralph Gibbins, an Englishman, partnered with Tilleke in 1902, and the firm adopted the name, Tilleke & Gibbins. Later, Ralph became a legal adviser in the Siamese Ministry of Justice, before serving as a judge of the International Court in 1916.

Samuel Brighouse and Reginald Atkinson led the firm from 1911 until Thailand’s involvement in World War II in 1941. During the war, the firm ceased operations. Some of the company documents were safeguarded by Ina Jorgensen, the former secretary of one of the firm's partners, Victor Jaques, who had fled abroad. In 1946, Mr. Jaques reestablished the firm as the sole partner remaining after the war had ended.

In 1951, Albert Lyman purchased the firm—minus its trademark and intellectual property work, which had been given to Jorgensen—from Victor Jaques for $2,500. Mr. Lyman and his wife, Freda, ran the firm with a Thai partner, Rojvit Periera. The Lymans’ son, David, joined the firm in 1967 and took over Tilleke & Gibbins’ operations after his father’s death in 1984. In addition to being Chairman of the firm, David also acts as the firm's Chief Values Officer.

Darani Vachanavuttivong and Tiziana Suchartikul are the Managing Partners of the firm.

== Practice areas ==
Tilleke & Gibbins is a full-service law firm working with multinational companies doing business in Southeast Asia. The firm's services are categorized into 6 multidisciplinary industry groups and 11 practices:

Industries

- Aviation
- Consumer Products
- Energy
- Insurance
- Life Sciences
- Technology

Practices

- Banking and Finance
- Capital Markets
- Competition and Trade
- Compliance and Investigations
- Corporate/M&A
- Dispute Resolution and Litigation
- Employment
- Intellectual Property
- Property
- Regulatory Affairs
- Tax

== Offices ==
Tilleke & Gibbins’ head office is in Bangkok, Thailand, with other offices in Hanoi and Ho Chi Minh City, Vietnam, Jakarta, Indonesia, Vientiane, Laos, Phnom Penh, Cambodia, and Yangon, Myanmar.

== Awards and rankings ==
Tilleke & Gibbins has been ranked as a leading legal practice in Southeast Asia in various legal directories, such as Asia-Pacific Legal 500, Asian Legal Business, Chambers Asia Pacific, and IFLR 1000. The firm's intellectual property practice has earned recognition from other, practice-specific directories, such as Asia IP, Intellectual Asset Management, Managing Intellectual Property, and World Trademark Review. In 2017, Tilleke & Gibbins won the "Southeast Asia Firm of the Year" award from Asialaw's Asia-Pacific Legal Awards. In 2018, Managing Intellectual Property named the firm as "Asia-Pacific CSR Firm of the Year."

The firm has received 17 Asian Legal Business "Employer of Choice" awards in Indonesia, Thailand, and Vietnam ".

== Memberships ==
Tilleke & Gibbins The firm is a longstanding member of international legal networks Lex Mundi and Multilaw. Partners from the firm have served as chair of Lex Mundi and Multilaw in 2017 and 2018.

== Museum of Counterfeit Goods ==
The firm's Bangkok office is the site of the Tilleke & Gibbins Museum of Counterfeit Goods, established in 1989. The museum's collection includes more than 3,500 counterfeit copies of trademarked and copyrighted goods. The museum has been featured on CNN and BBC in documentaries on counterfeiting in Thailand. Additionally, The Condé Nast Traveler, The Christian Science Monitor, and Time magazine have also profiled the museum.
