= Aphaiphubet =

Title in Thai nobility

Aphaiphubet (Thai: อภัยภูเบศร) is a Thai noble title granted to some governors of Battambang, who acted as rulers of Inner Cambodia during the period of Siamese rule from 1794 to 1907. Past titleholders all came from what is now the Abhayavongsa family.

Holders of the title included:

- Chaophraya Aphaiphubet (Baen)
- Phraya Aphaiphubet (Baen)
- Phraya Aphaiphubet (Rot)
- Phraya Aphaiphubet (Ched)
- Phraya Aphaiphubet (Som)
- Phraya Aphaiphubet (Nong)
- Chaophraya Aphaiphubet (Chum Abhayavongsa), father of Thai prime minister Khuang Aphaiwong
- Phraya Aphaiphubet (Lueam Abhayavongsa)
