= Phra Yot Muang Khwang =

Siamese government official (1852–1900)

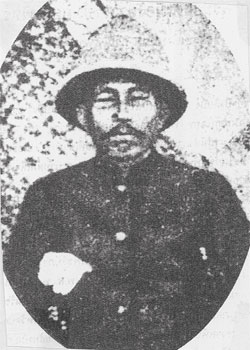
Phra Yot pictured shortly after his release from prison in 1898.

Kham Yodpetch (Thai: ขำ ยอดเพ็ชร์), also known by his title Major Phra Yot Muang Khwang (Thai: พระยอดเมืองขวาง) (1852 – 4 April 1900) was a Siamese government official under the Ministry of Interior during the reign of King Chulalongkorn. He was the Siamese last governor of Khammouane, a province in the Lao Puan Administrative Division (Monthon) on the border with French Annam. He served under the command of Prince Prachaksinlapakhom, then Governor of Lao Puan Administrative Division and the reigning monarch's brother. Territorial disputes with the French and the ensuing Franco-Siamese crisis of 1893 foregrounded his role as governor of two strategically significant border towns. He would rise to further prominence after French colonial authorities tried and imprisoned him.

== Early life and career ==
Kham Yodpetch was born in 1852 in Banphot Phisai District, Nakhonsawan in central Siam to a prominent family of administrators. He began his career at a time when central authorities in Bangkok had overhauled entirely the Siamese system of provincial administration. A number of minor provinces were merged into larger ones, and provincial governors lost most of their autonomy when the post was converted into one appointed and salaried by the Interior Ministry. A new form of administrative division called the monthon (circle) – a larger collection of several provinces – was created. A formal scheme to educate the newly constituted civil service was also introduced. These reforms were the brainchild of influential intellectual and advisor to the King, Prince Damrong Rajanubhab, who was widely considered second only to the monarch in power.

Yodpetch entered the civil service as an assistant to the Governor of Champasak, an administrative outpost located in the southern Laotian plateau that Siam had annexed in 1829. He swiftly moved up the ranks of the administrative bureaucracy, later being appointed Governor of Xiengkhouang Province. Shortly thereafter in 1885, he was promoted to the position of Major and royally bestowed the title Phra Yot Muang Kwang in recognition of his service. The ministry also transferred him to the post of Governor of Khammouane. He was responsible for the towns of Ban Nape, Khamkeut, Nakay, Pak Piboon, and Kieng Chek, all situated along the border with the French Protectorate of Annam.

== 1893 Dispute with French Indochina ==
In 1893, shortly before the Paknam Incident, disputes regarding the demarcation of borders along the left bank of the Mekong River arose between France and Siam. These territories changed hands multiple times over the course of the nineteenth century, having been heavily contested between Laotians, Annamites, the Siamese, and the French. In May 1893, the Governor-General of French Indochina gave an order for a French delegate, Resident Luce, to proceed to Khammouane from the Annamese province of Vinh, his mission being to wrest control of the area from Phra Yot. On the 18th of May, Luce presented himself before Phra Yot and demanded that Phra Yot relocate to the southern Laotian city of Outhene; Luce offered to accompany Phra Yot on the journey. Phra Yot reluctantly agreed, and according to French sources, wrote a conciliatory letter addressed to Luce. On May 26, 1893, a French Inspector of Militia, Grosgurin, was ordered to escort Phra Yot from Khammouane to Outhene alongside a number of Annamese militiamen and a Cambodian interpreter.

Varied accounts of the following events, of both Siamese and French origin, exist. French sources contend that once the entourage neared the town of Kieng Chek, Phra Yot sought to gradually distance himself from the group, and that one of his deputies, a Siamese man named Luang Anurak, began spreading alarm amongst villagers by defaming and vilifying Grosgurin and his forces. In response, Grosgurin’s men seized Luang Anurak in a move that the French deemed a non-hostile measure to prevent further conflict. A week later, on June 5, 1893, Grosgurin was killed. French investigators argued that Phra Yot set fire to Grosgurin’s lodging while the inspector was asleep and recovering from an illness. The fire also claimed the lives of several Annamese militiamen and the Cambodian interpreter.

Siamese accounts allege that Grosgurin seized Luang Anurak without pretext in an aggressive and hostile manner, and that Grosgurin’s subsequent death was the result of a skirmish that Luang Anurak’s seizure had provoked.

Alarmed by the developments in southern Laos, French explorer and prominent Indochinese colonial official Auguste Pavie accused Phra Yot of homicide, claiming that he had killed an ailing and defenseless Grosgurin. Pavie raised the matter with King Chulalongkorn and demanded Phra Yot stand trial. He also suggested that Prince Bijitprijakara, the king’s half-brother and commander of Siam’s forces in the northeast, preside as chairman over a seven-judge panel. Two civil servants from the Siamese Foreign Ministry would prosecute on behalf of the petitioners, while the Ceylonese-Siamese lawyer William Alfred Tilleke and British lawyer Vernon Page were to serve as Phra Yot’s defense attorneys.

== Trial and Imprisonment ==
The first trial of Phra Yot Muang Kwang took place over 22 days, from February 24 to March 16, 1894. The panel of judges ultimately acquitted the former governor, ruling that he was not guilty of the charges that the petitioners had brought forth. He was subsequently freed and released, much to the chagrin of the then Governor-General of French Indochina, Jean Marie Antoine de Lanessan. De Lanessan demanded a retrial, proposing that Phra Yot be brought before a mixed Franco-Siamese court with extraterritorial jurisdiction. The court derived its authority from the Franco-Siamese convention of 1893, an agreement that the two countries had concluded in October 1893. Siam accepted de Lanessan’s demands. Three French judges traveled from Saigon to Bangkok and heard the case alongside two Siamese judges, and the court sat from June 4 to June 13, 1894. They overturned the prior panel’s decision, ruling 3 – 2 along national lines that Phra Yot be sentenced to 20 years imprisonment and penal labor.

Following a request from the metropolitan French Government, Phra Yot was released on 6 November 1898 after serving 4 years of his sentence. King Chulalongkorn awarded him a monthly allowance of 500 Baht, and he was hailed as a national hero and patriot.

== Death and legacy ==
Phra Yot fell severely ill with tuberculosis two years after his release and died on 4 April 1900 at the age of 48. The Yodpetch and Krishnamitra families trace their lineage to him.

One Royal Thai Army camp and one Thai Border Patrol Police are named in his honor. They are:

1. Phra Yot Muang Kwang Camp, Army Division 210, located at Kuruku Subdistrict, Mueang Nakhon Phanom District, Nakhon Phanom Province, and
2. Phra Yot Muang Kwang Camp, Commanding Division 3, Special Training Division Border Patrol Police Headquarters, located at Ban Nong Hoi, Chae Ramae Subdistrict, Mueang Ubon Ratchathani District, Ubon Ratchathani Province.
