= Franco-Siamese Treaty of 1907 =

Treaty between French Indochina and Siam

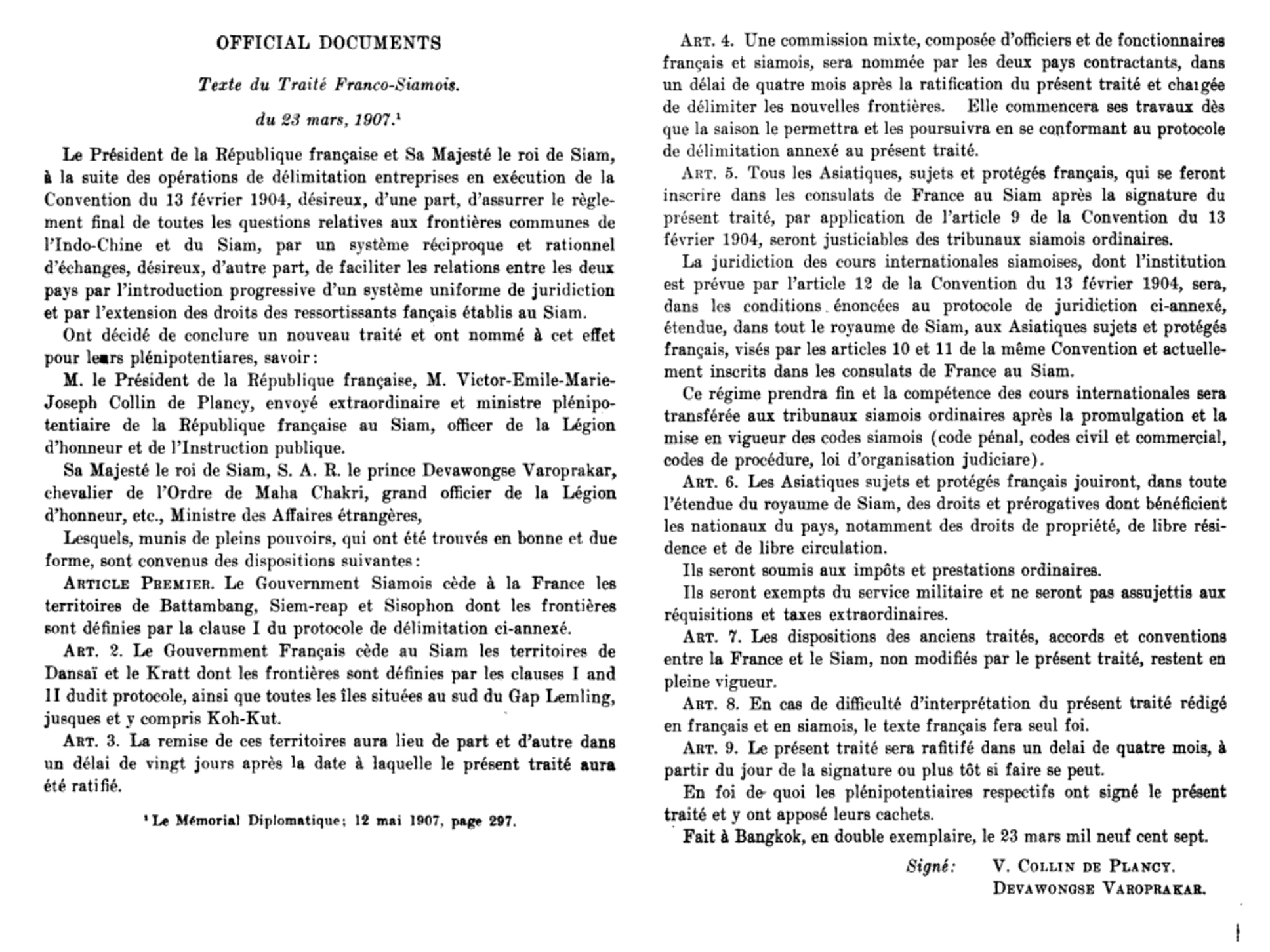
The text of the treaty (French version)

The Franco-Siamese treaty of 1907 was an agreement between the French Third Republic and the Thai Rattanakosin Kingdom (or Siam), in which Siam agreed to cede the territories of Inner Cambodia (including Battambang, Siem Reap and Sisophon), while France agreed to withdraw from Trat and Dan Sai. Importantly, the treaty also ended French extraterritoriality over its Asian subjects in Siam, and made provisions for the demarcation of the boundary between Siam and France's colonial possessions in French Indochina.

The treaty was signed in Bangkok on 23 March 1907 by French minister Victor Collin de Plancy and Prince Devawongse, Siam's Minister of Foreign Affairs. The treaty, which reunited the ancient Khmer capital of Angkor with the rest of Cambodia, addressed outstanding issues remaining after the previous treaty of 1904, in light of the international political developments following the Entente Cordiale between France and the United Kingdom. It was the final territorial agreement between Siam and colonial France, settling the conflict that began with the 1893 Franco-Siamese crisis and largely defining Thailand's modern borders with Cambodia and Laos. However, the actual demarcation of the border produced maps that deviated from the text of the treaty in certain areas—especially around the temple of Preah Vihear—leading to the Cambodian–Thai border dispute, which has continued into the 21st century.

== See also ==
- Territorial losses of Thailand
