= William Alfred Tilleke =

Ceylonese-Siamese lawyer (1860–1918)

William Alfred Goone-Tilleke (1860–1918) was a Ceylonese-Siamese lawyer, entrepreneur and aristocrat. He was the founder of the law firm Tilleke & Gibbins, a Privy Council of Thailand and second Attorney General of Siam (1912–1917). In Siam he was also known as Phraya Attakarnprasiddhi (Thai: พระยาอรรถการประสิทธิ RTGS: Phraya Atthakan Prasit).

== Early life ==
Born to a well-known Sinhalese family, William Alfred Goone-Tilleke was the son of Moses Goonetilleke of Kandy, Chief Mudaliyar and justice of the peace for the Central Province of Ceylon. He was educated at St Thomas' College and at University of Calcutta. Having been called to the bar in Ceylon, he started a practice in Kandy and was also elected to the Kandy Municipal Council in 1885. He thereafter served as a magistrate of the Municipal Court.

== Siam ==
In 1890, Tilleke came to Siam and started a new practice. In 1894, Tilleke gained recognition when he, together with Siamese lawyer Luang Damrong Thammasan, successfully defended Phra Yot Muang Khwang, a Siamese provincial governor, who had been accused of murdering a French military officer in the aftermath of the Franco-Siamese conflict of 1893. In the face of colonial pressure by the French and before a French Court conducted in Thailand, Tilleke defended Phra Yot with exonerating evidence. All seven judges returned a "not guilty" verdict. In 1897 he worked for the Attorney General's Office of Siam. At the same time, he was involved in the development of the country, investing in railway, rubber, and manufacturing companies. He owned the Bagan Rubber Company, active in the Malay sultanate of Kelantan, a vassal state of Siam until 1909.

In 1902, he formed the firm Tilleke & Gibbins in partnership with Ralph Gibbins, an Englishman who became a legal adviser in the Siamese Ministry of Justice, before serving as a judge on the International Court in 1916. With G. W. Ward, he started The Siam Observer, the first English-language daily newspaper in Siam. Tilleke was a foreign legal advisor to King Chulalongkorn (Rama V). He was involved in the drafting of the 1908 Penal Code of Siam. Tilleke adopted Siamese citizenship in 1910, relinquishing his British passport. After having served as acting attorney general, Tilleke held the position of Attorney General of Siam from 1912 until his death in 1917. For his services, Tilleke was bestowed the Thai noble title Maha Ammat Tho Phraya Attakarn Prasiddhi by the Siamese King.

His brothers were A. F. G. Tilleke (Phya Singhol), Assistant Harbour Master of Siam, and Dr. R. E. G. Tillek (Phya Viraj Vejjakich), king's physician, and head of the Vajira Hospital in Dusit District. His nephew, R. F. G. Tilleke, was editor of The Bangkok Times. Goone-Tilleke's children changed their family name to Kunadilok (or Khuna-dilok; Thai: คุณะดิลก, originally romanized as Guna Tilaka by King Vajiravudh of Siam.) His son Daeng was a fighter for the Free Thai Movement during World War II. Tilleke's daughter Lekha was appointed to the Senate in 1949 as the joint-first woman Senator in Thailand, and married Khuang Aphaiwong who was prime minister of Thailand for three terms between 1944 and 1948 and leader of the Democrat Party of Thailand.
