= Pan-Thaiism =

Ideology that flourished in Thailand in the 1930s and 1940s

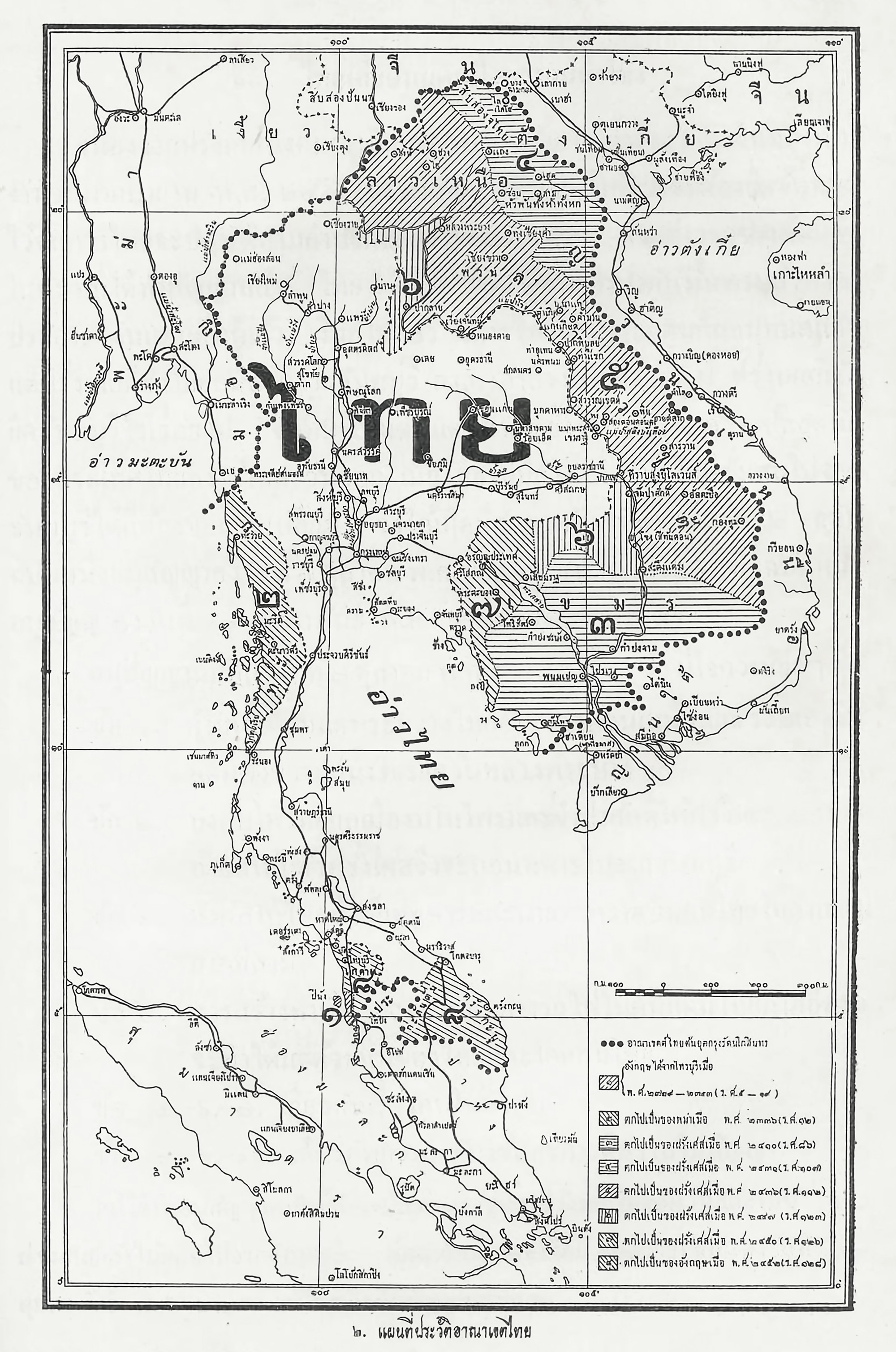
Map of the history of Thailand's boundary, 1940, showing claimed lost territories. Versions of the map were widely distributed to advance the Pan-Thaiist ideology.

Pan-Thaiism (otherwise known as Pan-Taiism, the pan-Thai movement, etc.) is an ideology that flourished in Thailand during the 1930s and 1940s. It was a form of irredentism, with the aim of political unification of all Thai people within Thailand, Burma, Malaya, Cambodia, and Laos, into a greater Thai state, sometimes referred to as the Great Thai Empire (Thai: มหาอาณาจักรไทย, Maha Anachak Thai).

Prior to the revolution of 1932, which replaced the absolute monarchy with a constitutional one, the Thai government had pursued good relations with the imperial powers, Britain and France, that ruled its neighbours: Burma, Malaya, Cambodia, and Laos; anti-colonial sentiment had been actively discouraged. However, the military government that came to power in 1938, under Plaek Phibunsongkhram, actively sought to restore Thai "lost" territories; it also aggressively promoted pan-Thaiism. The intellectual architect of the new Thai nationalism was Wichit Wathakan.

The country officially changed its name from Siam to Thailand, with the word "Thai" being interpreted in an idiosyncratic way, not only referring to speakers of Central Thai (Siamese) or even Tai languages generally, but to all those who had once been under the Ayutthaya and Rattanakosin kingdoms.

During World War II, Thailand was able to take advantage of the defeat of France in Europe to seize territory in Cambodia and Laos in a brief war. Following the December 1941 Japanese invasion of Thailand, Thailand made common cause with the Japanese and occupied parts of Burma and Malaya. Thai rule was not generally welcomed by the subject populations, however. In Laos especially, French authorities promoted rhetoric and reforms of "renovating" Lao culture under Governor-General of Indochina Jean Decoux, but this was mainly used to dampen the appeal of Pan-Thaiism and strengthen Lao cooperation within the French colonial system rather than develop any sense of Lao separatist nationalism. Nonetheless, a counter-irredentism emerged among Lao nationalists, who aimed to bring much of northern Thailand under Lao rule. Few of Thailand's new subjects identified as "Thai" in any sense. The war ended in Thailand's defeat and the overthrow of the military government, and Thailand returned to its pre-war borders as last adjusted in the Anglo-Siamese Treaty of 1909.
