= 1893 Franco-Siamese crisis =

1893 conflict between France and Siam

Franco-Siamese crisis (1893)
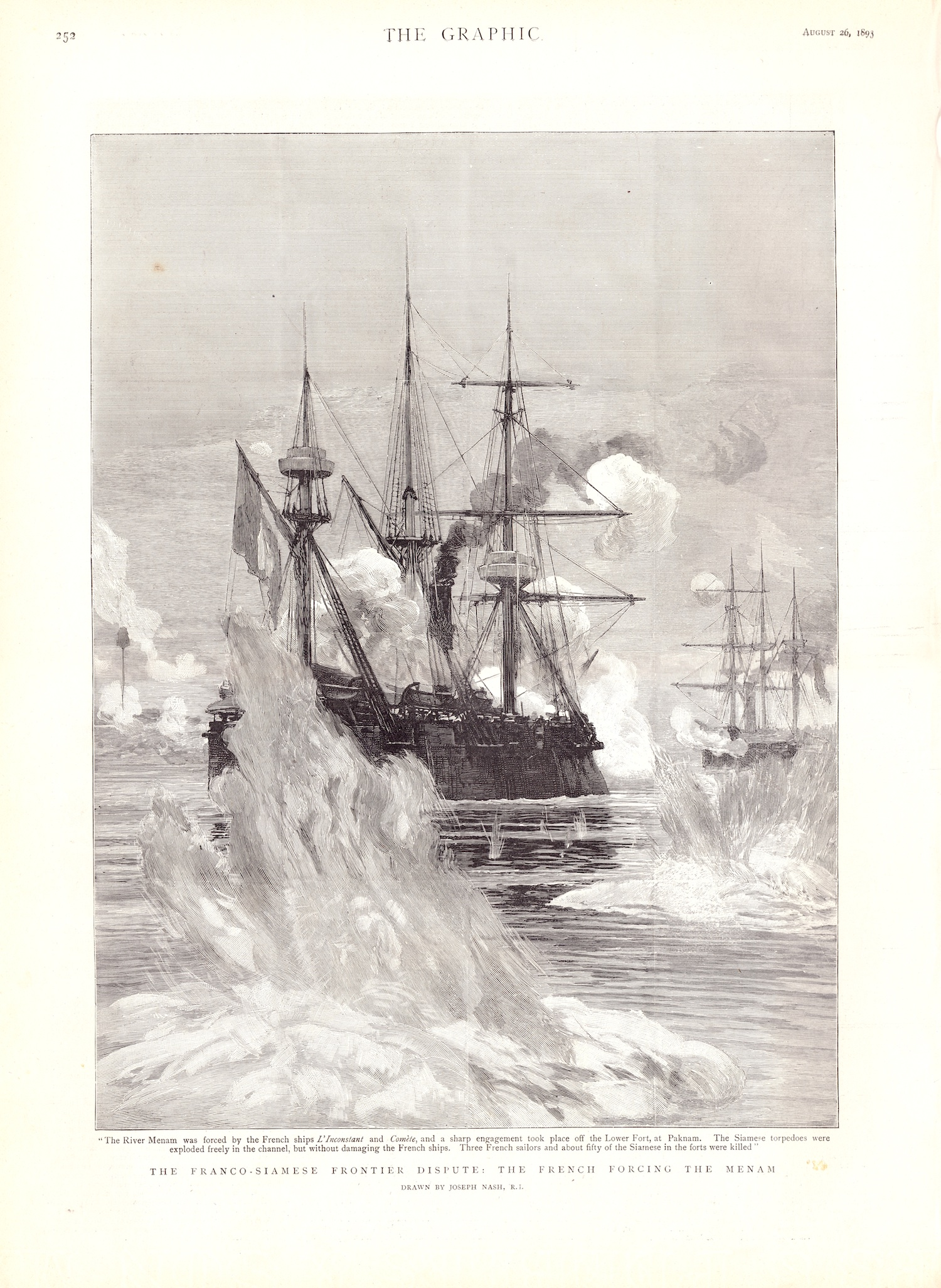
- French ships Inconstant and Comète under fire in the Paknam incident, 13 July 1893. The Graphic.
Date	13 July – 3 October 1893
Location	French Indochina (in modern Laos)
Result	French victory French protectorate over Laos; Split of the Lao-speaking world into the Lao and Isan languages
Territorial changes	Land on east bank of the Mekong ceded to French Indochina

Belligerents
France: French Indochina	Siam

Commanders and leaders
Auguste Pavie; Jean de Lanessan	Chulalongkorn; Devawongse Varoprakar; Bhanurangsi Savangwongse; Andreas de Richelieu

Strength
2 ships 200 soldiers and crew members	Fort Phra Chulachomklao approximately 500 soldiers

Casualties and losses
3 killed 3 wounded	16 killed 20 wounded

The Franco-Siamese crisis of 1893, known in Thailand as the Incident of Rattanakosin Era 112 (Thai: วิกฤตการณ์ ร.ศ. 112, RTGS: wikrittakan roso-roisipsong, [wí krít tàʔ kaːn rɔː sɔ̌ː rɔ́ːj sìp sɔ̌ːŋ]) was a conflict between the French Third Republic and the Kingdom of Siam. Auguste Pavie, French vice-consul in Luang Prabang in 1886, was the chief agent in furthering French interests in Laos.

His intrigues, which took advantage of Siamese weakness in the region and periodic invasions by Vietnamese rebels from Tonkin, increased tensions between Bangkok and Paris. The conflict concluded with the Paknam Incident, in which French gunboats sailed up the Chao Phraya River to blockade Bangkok. The Siamese subsequently agreed to cede the area that constitutes most of present-day Laos to France, an act that led to the significant expansion of French Indochina. This conflict succeeded the Haw wars (1865–1890), in which the Siamese attempted to pacify northern Siam and Tonkin.

== Context ==
Siam Pre-1893 Partition (1893)

Siam after the incident

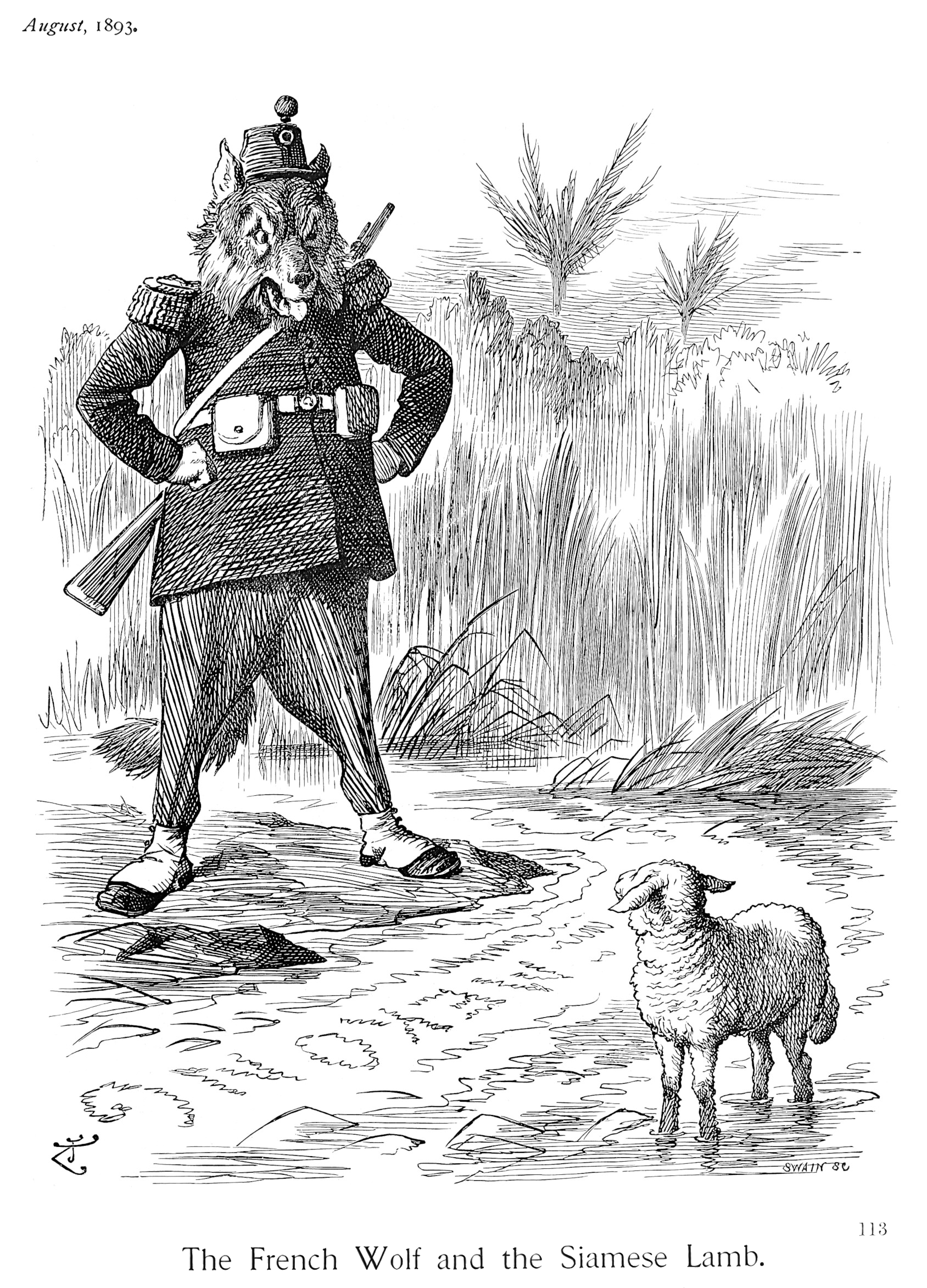
Punch Magazine cartoon showing the "French wolf" looking across the Mekong toward the "Siamese lamb"

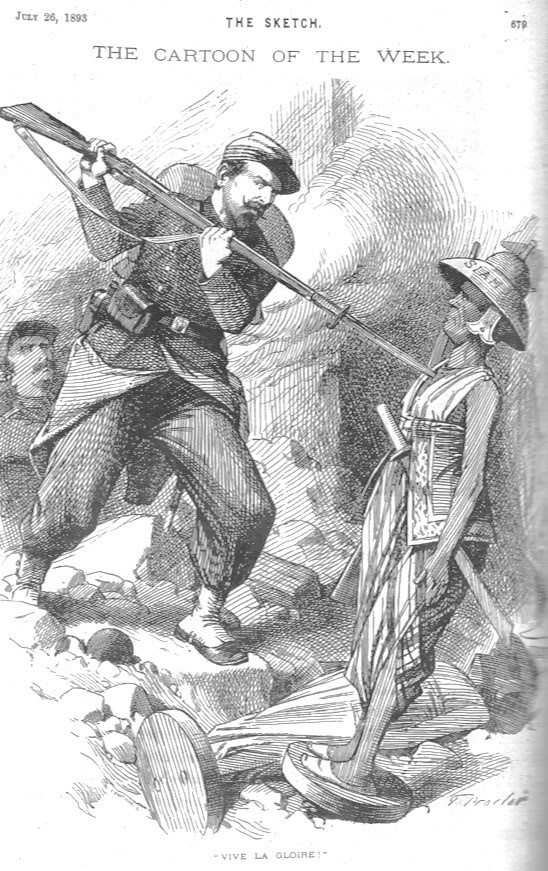
A cartoon from the British newspaper The Sketch shows a French soldier attacking a Siamese soldier depicted as a harmless wooden figure, reflecting the technological superiority of French troops.

The conflict started when French Indochina's governor-general Jean de Lanessan sent Auguste Pavie as consul to Bangkok to bring Laos under French rule. The government in Bangkok, mistakenly believing that they would be supported by the British government, refused to concede territory east of the Mekong and instead reinforced their military and administrative presence.

Events were brought to a head by two separate incidents when Siamese governors in Khammuan and Nong Khai expelled three French merchants from the middle Mekong in September 1892, two of them, Champenois and Esquilot, on suspicion of opium smuggling. Shortly afterward, the French consul in Luang Prabang, Victor-Alphonse Massie, feverish and discouraged, committed suicide on his way back to Saigon. Back in France, these incidents were used by the colonial lobby (Parti Colonial) to stir up nationalistic anti-Siamese sentiment, as a pretext for intervention.

The death of Massie left Auguste Pavie as the new French Consul. In March 1893, Pavie demanded that the Siamese evacuate all military posts on the east side of the Mekong River south of Khammuan, claiming that the land belonged to Vietnam. To back up these demands, the French sent the gunboat Lutin to Bangkok, where it was moored on the Chao Phraya next to the French legation.

== Conflict ==
When Siam rejected the French demands, Lanessan sent three military columns into the disputed region to assert French control in April 1893. Eight small Siamese garrisons west of the Mekong withdrew upon the arrival of the central column, but the advance of the other columns met with resistance. In the north, the French came under siege on the island of Khoung, with the capture of an officer, Thoreaux. In the south the occupation proceeded smoothly until an ambush by the Siamese on the village of Keng Kert resulted in the killing of French police inspector Grosgurin.

=== Killing of Inspector Grosgurin ===
Inspector Grosgurin was a French inspector and commander of a Vietnamese militia in Laos. Like Auguste Pavie, he had been engaged in several exploratory expeditions in the region. He was a member of one of the French armed columns dispatched in April 1893 by Lassenan to cross the Annamite Range into the Lao area of Khammuan (modern Thakhek) and to occupy the disputed territory. The column was at first successful in evicting the Siamese commissioner at Khammuan by 25 May.

Shortly afterward on 5 June, the Siamese commissioner organized a surprise ambush on the village of Kien Ket, where Grosgurin, confined to his sickbed, had encamped with his militia. The commissioner had apparently been instructed by Siamese government representatives to "compel their [French troops] retirement, by fighting, if necessary, to the utmost of their strength". The ambush resulted in the razing of the village and the killing of Grosgurin and 17 Vietnamese.

The incident and the death of Grosgurin became known as the "Affair of Kham Muon (Kien Chek)" and was ultimately used as a pretext for strong French intervention.

=== Paknam incident ===
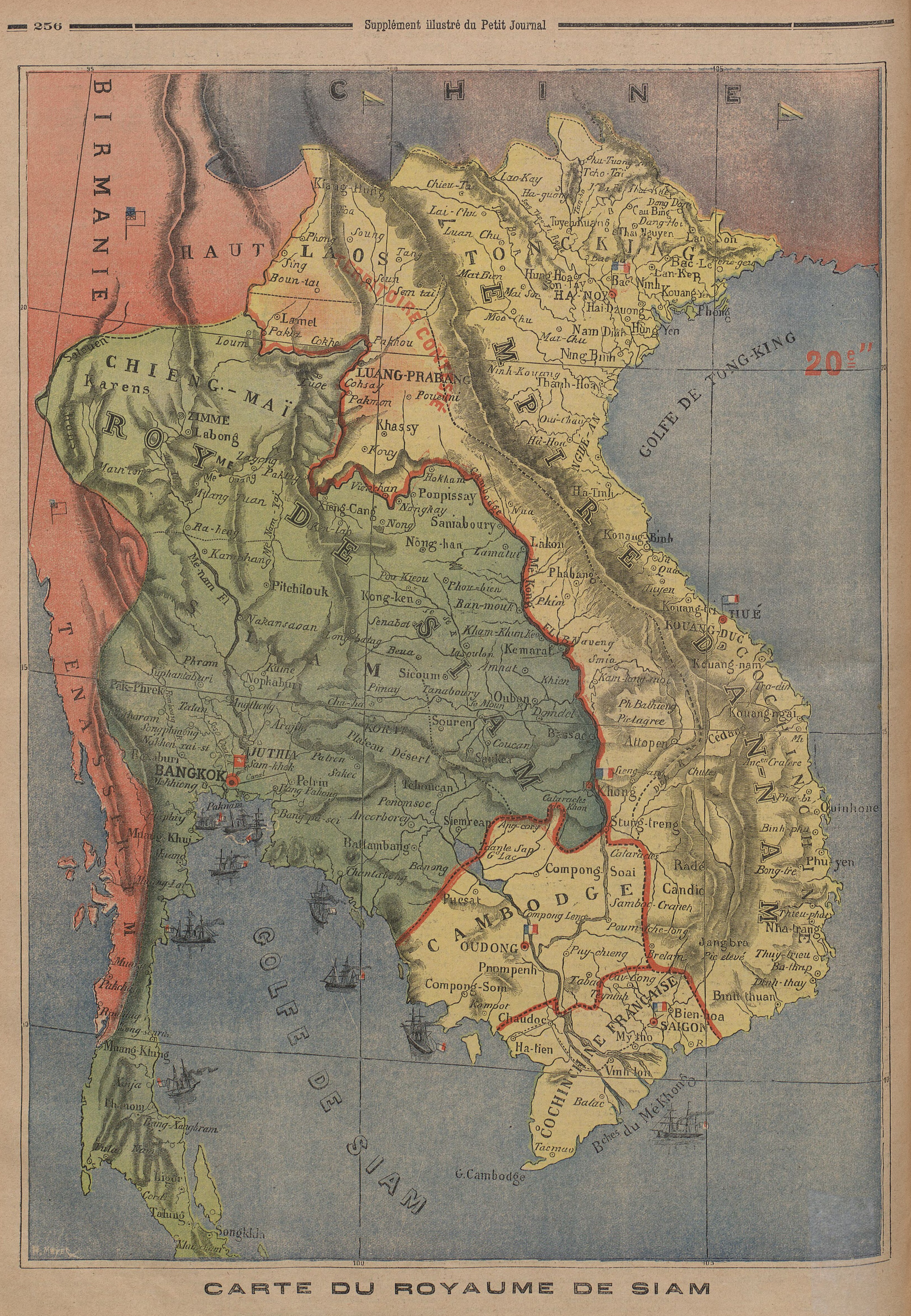
Map of Siam by Petit Journal, 12 August 1893

As a result, France demanded reparations and tensions with the British over control of Siam came to a peak. The British sent three navy ships to the mouth of the Chao Phraya, in case evacuation of British citizens became necessary. In turn the French went one step further in July 1893 by ordering two of their ships, the sloop Inconstant and the gunboat Comète, to sail up the Chao Phraya toward Bangkok, without the permission of the Siamese. They came under fire from the fort at Paknam on 13 July 1893.

The French returned fire and forced their way to Bangkok.

With guns trained on the Grand Palace in Bangkok, the French delivered an ultimatum to the Siamese on 20 July to hand over the territory east of the Mekong and withdraw their garrisons there, to pay an indemnity of three million francs or 2.11 million baht (10.5 billion baht adjusted for inflation) in reparation for the fighting at Paknam, and to punish those responsible for the killings in the disputed territory. When Siam did not immediately comply unconditionally to the ultimatum, the French blockaded the Siamese coast.

In the end the Siamese submitted fully to the French conditions after finding no support from the British. In addition, the French demanded as guarantees the temporary occupation of Chantaburi and the demilitarization of Battambang, Siem Reap and a 25-kilometer (16 mi)-wide zone on the west bank of the Mekong. The conflict led to the signature of the Franco-Siamese Treaty, on 3 October 1893.

=== Franco-Siamese trial ===
Following the killing of Grosgurin, the Commissioner of the Khammuan District, Phra Yot, was acknowledged by his government to have been the responsible official, although he was initially acquitted of wrongdoing in a trial in March 1894. A "Franco-Siamese Mixed Court" was subsequently convened in June 1894. The court determined that Phra Yot had brought extra forces to surround the house in Kien Ket occupied by the ill Grosgurin, outnumbering his small Vietnamese militia; that Grosgurin and those Vietnamese who had not managed to escape had been killed and the house subsequently set on fire on the orders of Phra Yot.

In a joint agreement between the Siamese and the French, Phra Yot was condemned to 20 years of penal servitude. The solicitor for the defense was the Ceylonese lawyer William Alfred Tilleke, who was later appointed Attorney General of Siam and granted a peerage by the king. The Royal Thai Army fort Phra Yot Muang Khwan in Nakhon Phanom Province on the border between Thailand and Laos commemorates Phra Yot.

== Consequences ==
Siamese territorial claims after the incident

The Siamese agreed to cede Laos to France, significantly expanding French Indochina. In 1896, France signed a treaty with Britain defining the border between Laos and British territory in Upper Burma. The Kingdom of Laos became a protectorate, initially placed under the Governor General of Indochina in Hanoi. Pavie, who almost single-handedly brought Laos under French rule, saw to the officialization in Hanoi.

The French and British both had strong interests in controlling parts of Indochina. Twice in the 1890s, they were on the verge of war over two different routes leading to Yunnan. But several difficulties discouraged them from war. The geography of the land made troop movements difficult, making warfare more costly and less effective. Both countries were fighting a difficult conflict within their respective colonies. Malaria was common and deadly. Ultimately, the imagined trade routes never really came into use. In 1904, the French and the British put aside their many differences with the Entente Cordiale, ending this dispute in southeastern Asia.

France continued to occupy Chanthaburi and Trat up until 1907, when Siam ceded to it the provinces of Battambang, Siem Reap and Banteay Meanchey.

== Gallery ==
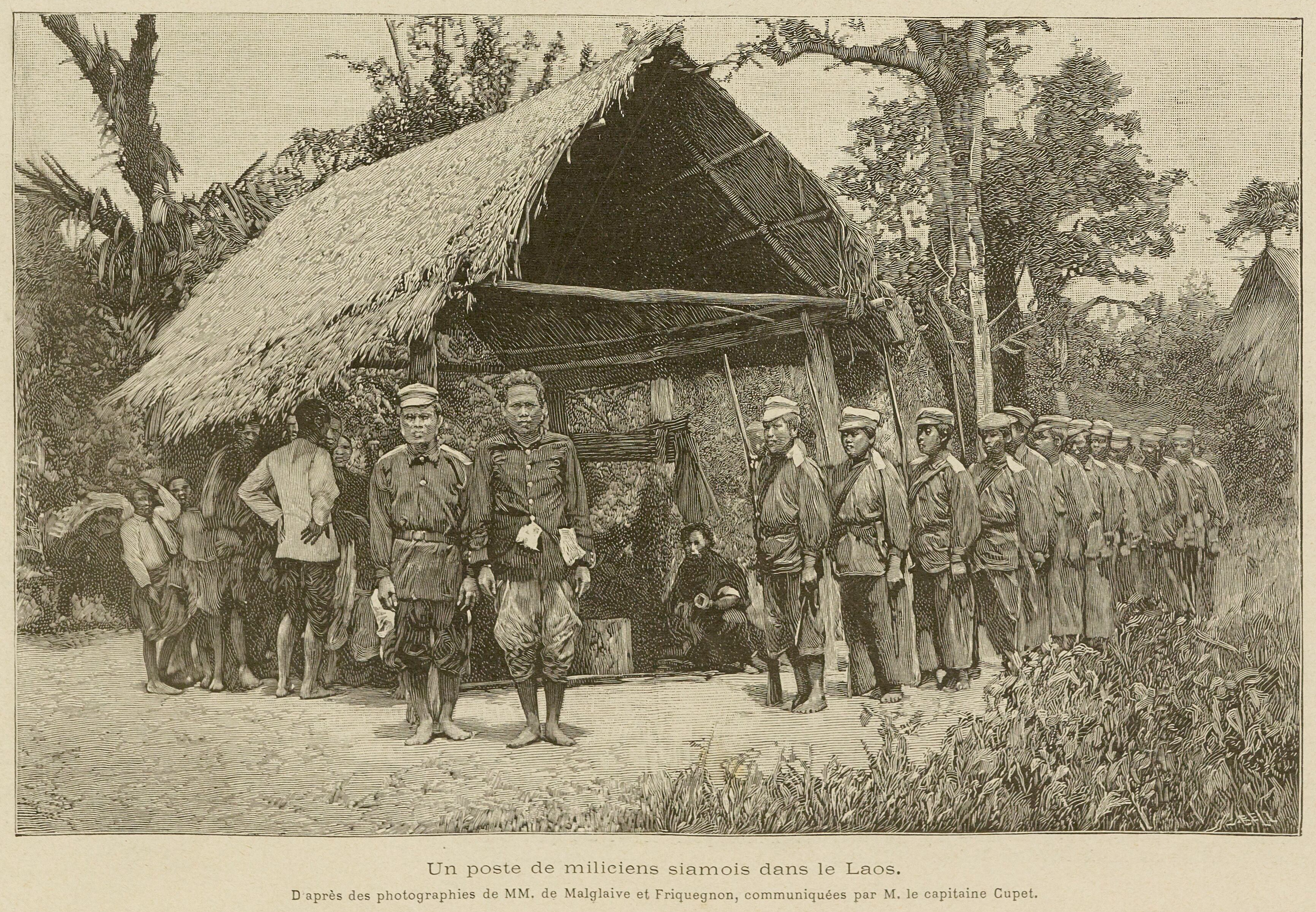
Siamese army in Laos in 1893

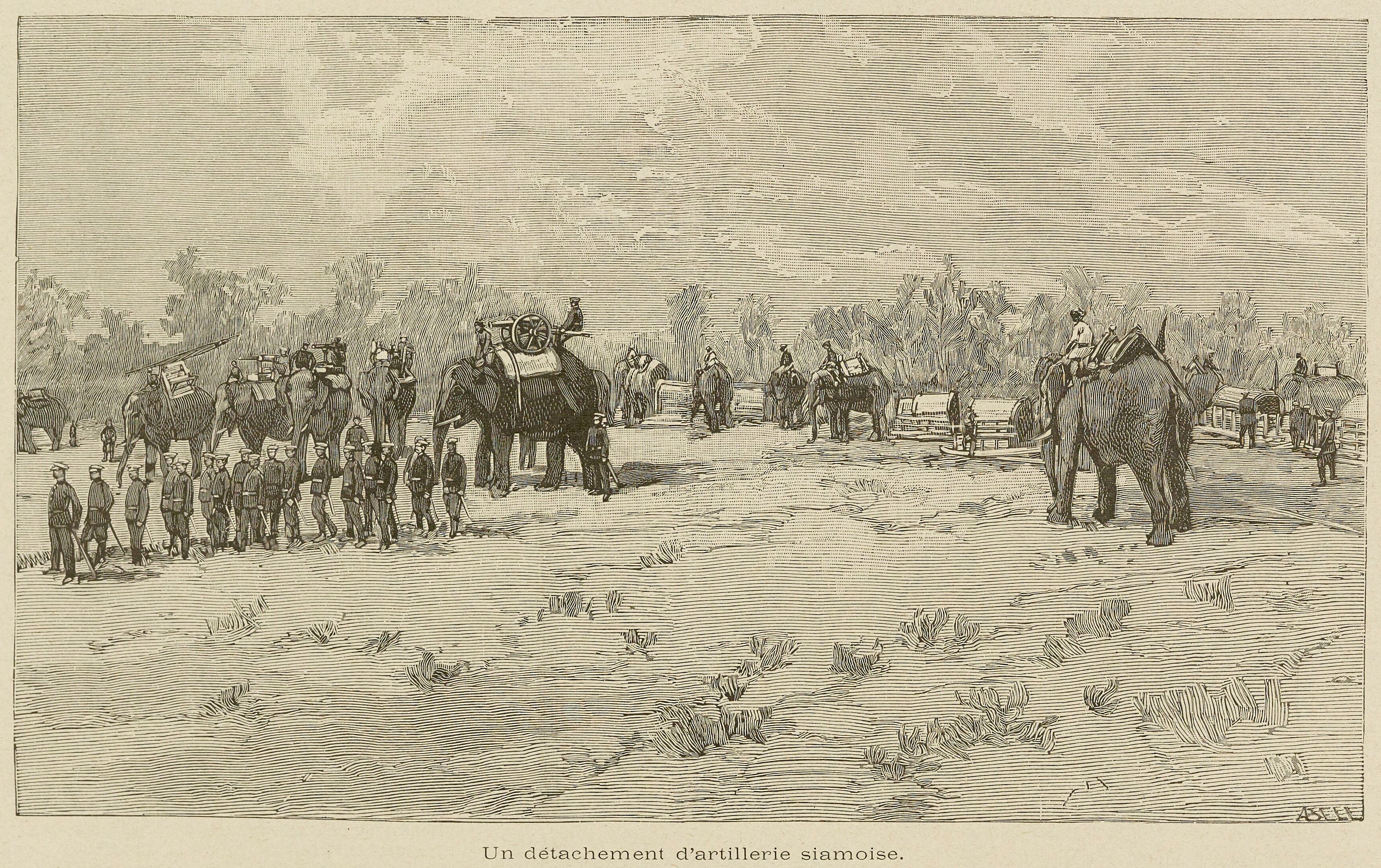
Siamese Elephant-mounted artillery in Laos in 1893

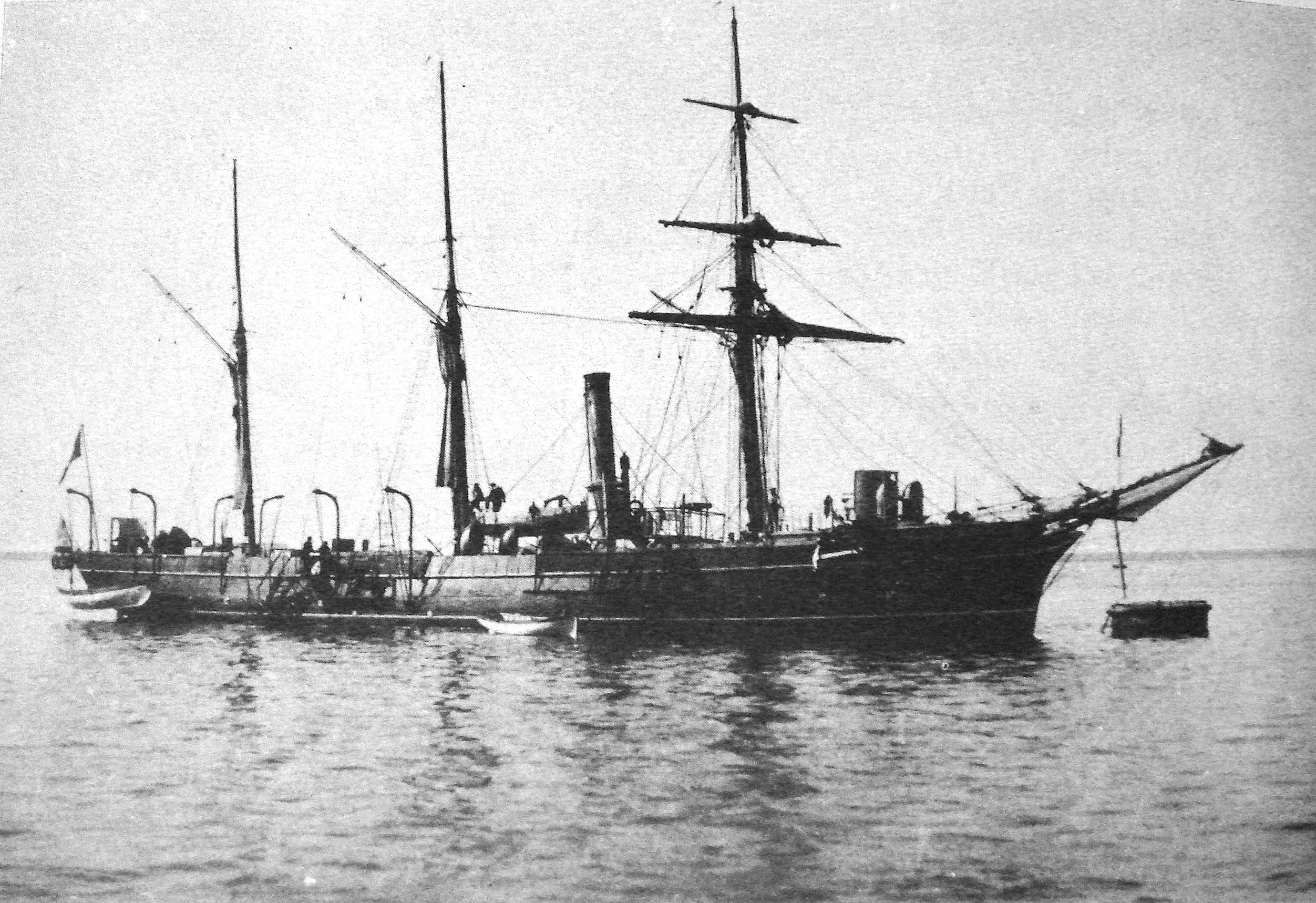
The French gunboat Comète (1884–1909)

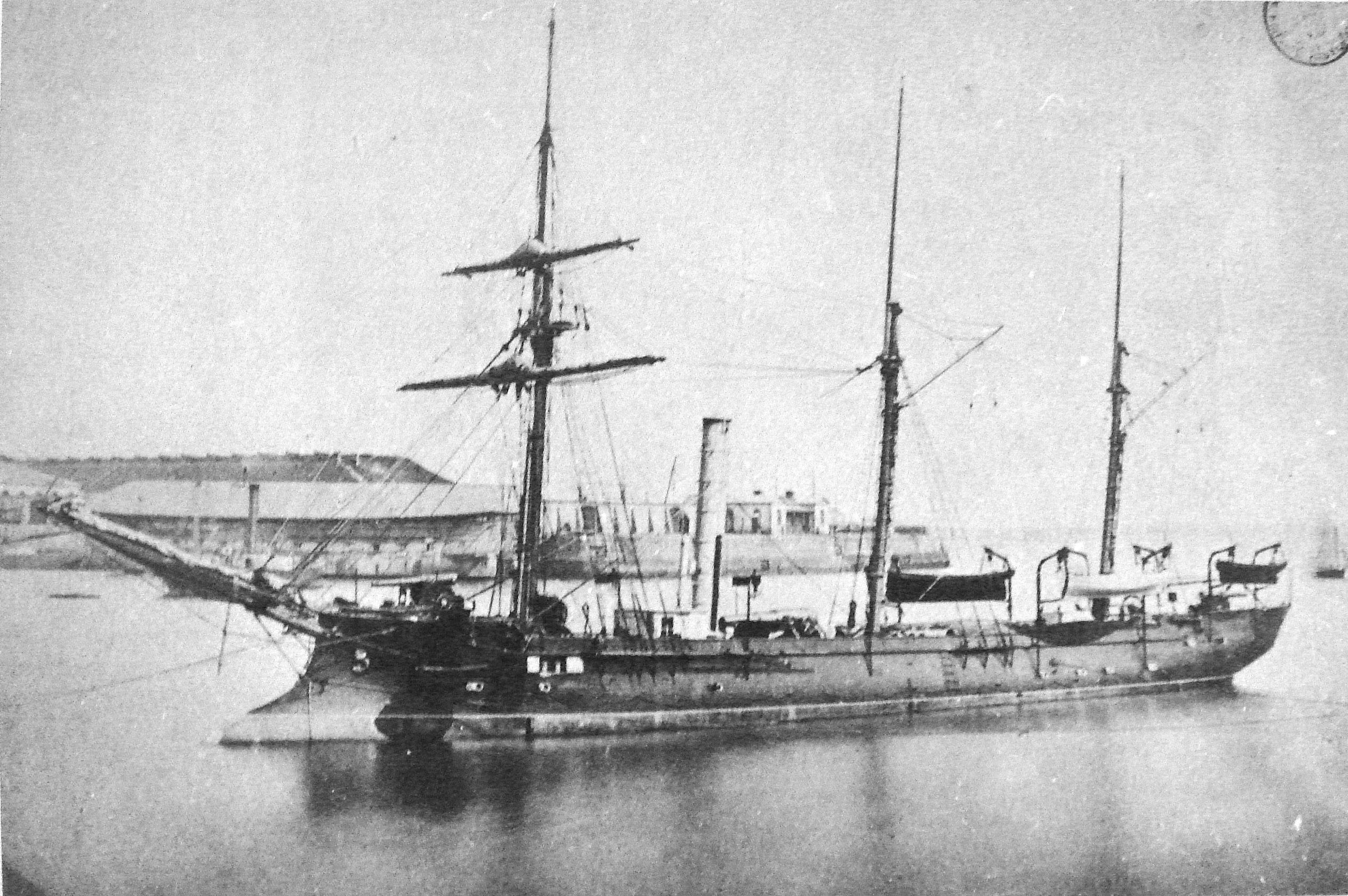
The gunboat Lutin (1877–1897) was stationed in central Bangkok in March 1893

== See also ==
- Territorial losses of Thailand, for all territory Thailand lost to other nations. https://www.le-souvenir-francais-thailande.com/a-chanthaburi-en-1899-la-tragique-histoire-de-louis-benjamin-jacquet/
