= Franco-Siamese Treaty of 1904 =

Set borders between Kingdom of Siam and neighboring French territories

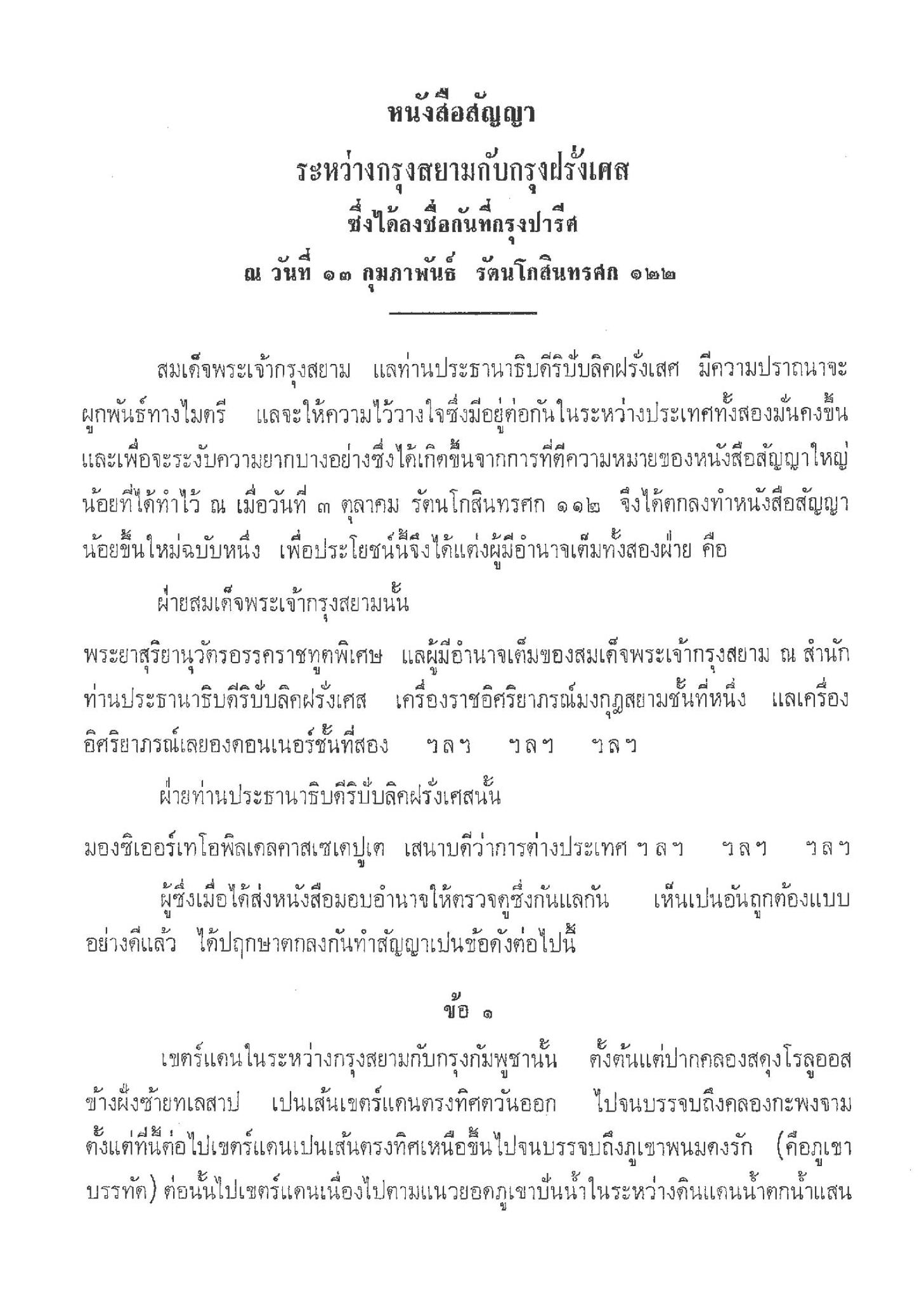
- Type: Convention
- Context: Siam cedes land on the right bank of the Mekong River to France.; France agreed to return Chanthaburi to Siam.; The French seized Phatchantakhirikhet and Dan Sai from Siam instead.
- Drafted: February 11, 1904
- Signed: February 13, 1904
- Location: Paris France
- Signatories: Phraya Suriyanuwat (Kerd Bunnag); (France) Théophile Delcassé
- Parties: Siam; France

The Franco–Siamese Treaty of 1904 (Thai: สนธิสัญญาสยาม–ฝรั่งเศส ร.ศ. 122) was a convention between the Kingdom of Siam during the reign of King Chulalongkorn and France during the presidency of President Émile Loubet. It sets out the demarcation of the boundary between the Kingdom of Siam and neighboring territories which had been colonized by France, as well as granting extraterritorial rights to French citizens.

== Signing ==
The Siamese plenipotentiary who signed this treaty was Phraya Suriyanuwat (Kerd Bunnag), Ambassador of Siam to France, and the French side is Théophile Delcassé, Minister of Foreign Affairs.

Negotiations took place in Paris, France, on February 11, 1904, and were signed two days later.

== See also ==
- Franco-Siamese Treaty of 1893
- Franco-Siamese Treaty of 1907
