= Ploenchit Fair =

British-Thai charity fund-raising fair

Ploenchit Fair is a fund-raising fair for charity projects in Thailand, managed by the British Community in Thailand Foundation For The Needy (BCTFN), previously known as the United Kingdom Commission for Thai Charities (UKCTC). BCTFN is a registered Thai Charity Foundation.

== History ==
UKCTC was established in 1968 and BCTFN was established as a full charity foundation under Thai law in 1999. The first Ploenchit Fair took place in 1957 in the grounds of the British Embassy in Bangkok, which is on Ploenchit Road. Prior to 1968, Ploenchit Fair was run by various committees of volunteers, mostly from the community of British people living and working in Thailand. UKCTC and BCTFN developed out of the British War Charities during the Second World War. The patron of the BCTFN is the British Ambassador to Thailand and his wife is the honorary president, and the committee is staffed by unpaid volunteers from the British expatriate community in Thailand.

=== Locations ===
- 1957—2001: British Embassy Grounds
- 2001: Suan Amphorn Grounds
- 2003: not held
- 2004—2006: Bec Tero Hall & Grounds, Suan Lum
- 2007: Shrewsbury International School Grounds
- 2011: Bangkok Patana School, Soi La Salle

== Operations ==
Ploenchit Fair is staffed and managed by around 2,000 volunteers per year, mostly Thais and British living in Thailand. Loosely based on the English "village fete" concept, it is a cosmopolitan event, with attendees and stallholders from many different countries. Over 250 corporate sponsors are involved in the fair.

== Fundraising ==
Funds raised at Ploenchit Fair have been allocated to hundreds of Thai charities over the years. In 1957, 31,000 Thai Baht were raised. Since 2000, over 40 million Baht has been raised at Ploenchit Fairs and distributed by BCTFN to Thai charities. Standard Chartered Bank maintains a "branch" at the Ploenchit Fair to administer the funds raised. Although Ploenchit Fair is the main source of funds raised by BCTFN, the group also receives funds from other sources such as donations, legacies, and proceeds from social events.

BCTFN funds are allocated to charity projects approved by the committee, supporting either new projects or existing projects which have the potential to become less dependent on charity funding in the future. The projects are monitored by a member of the committee and a final report with photographs is presented by the recipient of the funds.
