= Cambodian–Thai border dispute =

Territorial dispute in Southeast Asia

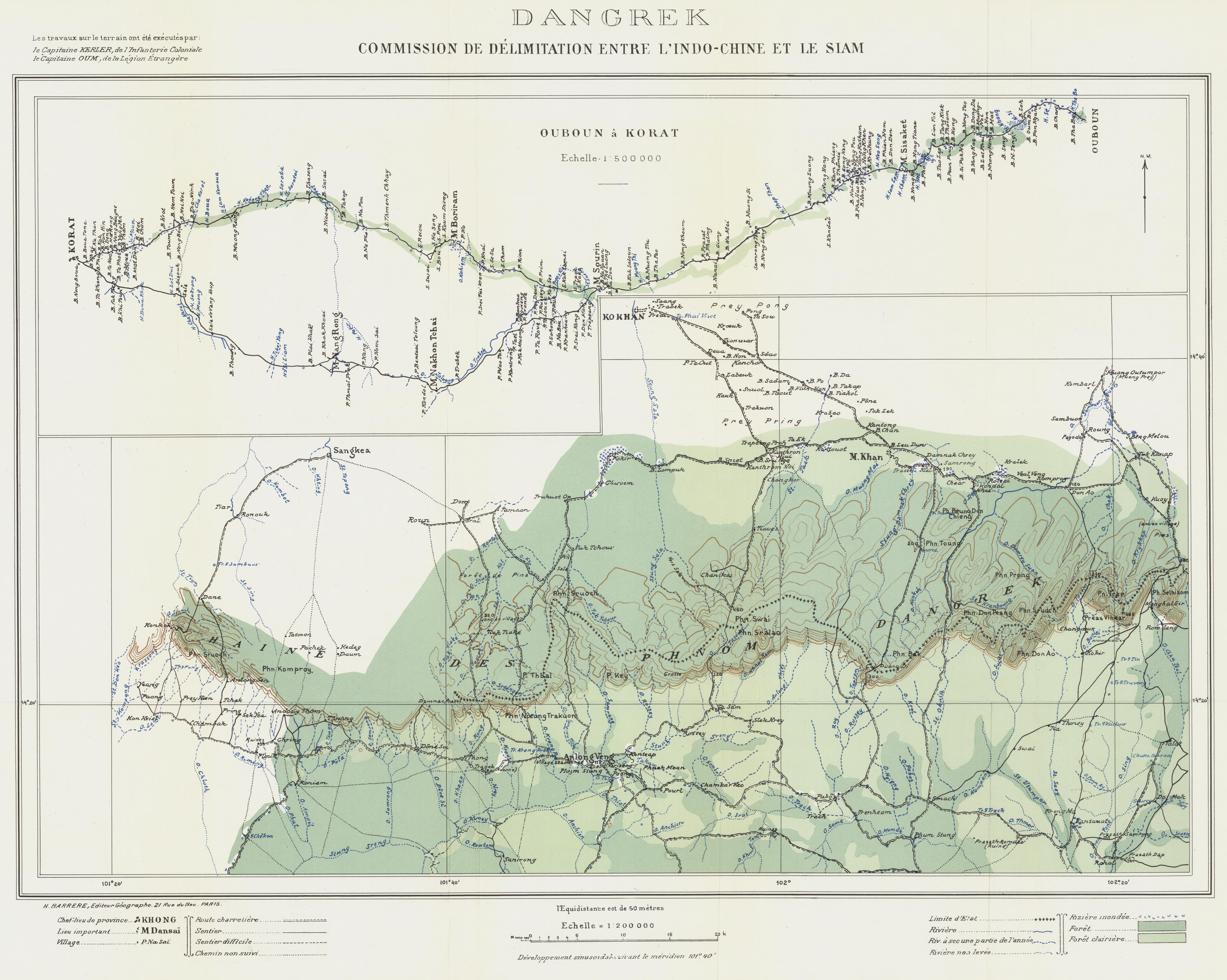
The 1909 delimitation map (the Annex I Map of the ICJ case) that gave rise to the dispute

Cambodia and Thailand have been involved in a territorial dispute over certain areas of their border. The dispute began in the 1950s, shortly after Cambodia's independence from France, and first centred on ownership of the Preah Vihear temple. The case was brought to the International Court of Justice (ICJ), who decided in 1962 in favour of Cambodia. The issue became dormant over the following decades as Cambodia fell into civil war, but remained unresolved as sections of the countries' borders were never jointly demarcated. The dispute erupted into open conflict in 2008, following Cambodia's nomination of the temple as a UNESCO World Heritage Site and Thai protesters pushing their government over the issue. The clashes led to a request for interpretation from the ICJ to clarify the 1962 ruling, which was decided in 2013. During this round of conflict, disputes also arose over other overlapping border areas, including those around the ancient Khmer temples of Prasat Ta Muen Thom and Prasat Ta Krabey. The conflict subsided for over a decade until it erupted again in 2025, with the worst fighting since the dispute began.

The dispute mostly stems from the Franco-Siamese treaties of 1904 and 1907, which defined the final boundary between Siam (as Thailand was then known) and French Indochina, the borders of which were inherited by Cambodia. While the treaty defined the relevant segment of the boundary along the watershed line of the Dangrek Mountains, demarcation of the border by French surveyors produced maps that deviated from the line in the now-disputed areas, including around the Preah Vihear temple. While Thailand argued at the ICJ that it never approved the maps and that the temple's location on a cliff, more accessible from the Thai side, indicated that it was on Thai territory, the ICJ decided in favour of Cambodia largely based on the fact that Siam never officially protested the map or claimed ownership of the temple while it was under French control. Cambodia also views itself as having rightful claims to the temples due to closer cultural affinity as successor to the Khmer Empire.

The two countries also have a large area of overlapping maritime claims resulting from continental shelf (exclusive economic zone) claims announced by Cambodia in 1972 and Thailand in 1973. A memorandum of understanding signed in 2001 agreed to the joint development of the disputed area south of the 11th parallel north, though there has been little progress since.

== Background ==
At its greatest extent around the 11th–13th centuries, the influence of the Khmer Empire extended across a large area of Mainland Southeast Asia, and many Angkor-era monuments are found throughout the present-day areas of not only Cambodia, but also Thailand and Laos. By the late 19th century, when the French established a protectorate over Cambodia, most of the present Cambodian–Thai border areas were under the control of Siam. As a result of the Franco-Siamese crisis of 1893, Siam was forced to cede extensive territorial claims over its Lao and Cambodian tributaries to French Indochina. Further subsequent negotiations led to the Franco-Siamese treaty of 1904, in which Siam ceded further areas on the right bank of the Mekong River, and the treaty of 1907, which ceded the areas of Inner Cambodia, including the ancient Khmer capital of Angkor. These treaties established the boundary between Siam and French Indochina, the latter of whose borders with Thailand were inherited by Cambodia and Laos when they gained independence in 1954.

Among the boundaries established by the treaties, the border between what is now northern Cambodia (including Oddar Meanchey and Preah Vihear provinces) and Thailand's Isan region (Buri Ram, Surin, Sisaket, and Ubon Ratchathani provinces) was defined along the watershed line of the Dangrek Mountains. The treaties also stipulated that the boundary be demarcated by a mixed commission composed of Thai and French officials. Two commissions were accordingly set up in accordance with each of the treaties, overseeing work performed by French surveyors. The maps resulting from the surveys were printed and published in Paris, and submitted to the two governments. It was later found that the maps contained significant deviations from the watershed line in several areas, including those of the now-disputed temples, especially Preah Vihear. However, the Thai government did not dispute the maps at the time, and recently revealed documents indicate that, as early as 1911, the government was aware that the applicable map showed the Preah Vihear temple as being located within Cambodia.

During World War II, Thailand, under the dictatorship of Plaek Phibunsongkhram, allied with the Empire of Japan and invaded French Indochina in 1940 to pursue its irredentist pan-Thai ideology and reclaim what it regarded as Thailand's lost territories. Thailand briefly annexed parts of the areas ceded in 1904 and 1907, but had to relinquish the claims when the war ended with the defeat of Japan.

== Temple of Preah Vihear case ==
Temple of Preah Vihear (Cambodia v. Thailand)
- Court: International Court of Justice
- Decided: 15 June 1962

Case history
- Subsequent action: Request for Interpretation of the Judgment of 15 June 1962 in the Case concerning the Temple of Preah Vihear (Cambodia v. Thailand) (Cambodia v. Thailand)

Case opinions
- The Temple is situated on Cambodian territory; Thailand is under an obligation to withdraw any military or police force stationed there and to restore to Cambodia any objects removed from the ruins since 1954.

The dispute between the two countries arose following Thai authorities' stationing of troops since 1954 at the Preah Vihear temple (known in Thai as Phra Wihan), in a disputed area between Preah Vihear province of Cambodia and Sisaket province of Thailand. Cambodia complained to the International Court of Justice (ICJ) in 1959, and it judged in 1962 that the temple is situated in Cambodian territory.

The dispute stemmed from the different maps each party used in national delimitation. France, who was the protector of Cambodia at the time, agreed with Siam in Franco-Siamese boundary treaty of 1904. The Mixed Commission was set up in 1905, and it was to carry out delimitation between Siam and Cambodia. Cambodia used the map published by French geographers in 1907 (called "Annex I map") which showed the Temple in Cambodian territory. While Thailand used the provisions of the treaty of 1904 which reads:

The frontier between Siam and Cambodia starts, on the left shore of the Great Lake, from the mouth of the river Stung Roluos, it follows the parallel from that point easterly direction until it meets the river Prek Kompong Tiam, then, turning northwards, it merges with the meridian from that meeting-point as far as the Pnom Dang Rek mountain chain. From there it follows the watershed between the basins of Nam Sen and the Mekong, on the one hand, and the Nam Moun, on the other hand, and joins the Pnom Padang chain the crest of which it follows eastwards as far as the Mekong. Upstream from that point, the Mekong remains the frontier of the Kingdom of Siam, in accordance with Article 1 of the Treaty of 3 October 1893.

This would deem the temple as being located within Thai territory.

The ICJ judged on 15 June 1962 that Annex I map did not bind both parties because it was not the work of the Mixed Commission per the treaty. However, both parties adopted the map and the demarcation line in it, therefore had a binding character. The Siamese government did not disagree or object to the map, hence Thailand was bound by it, according to the legal principle "Qui tacet consentire videtur si loqui debuisset ac potuisset." ICJ ruled by nine to three that the Temple was located in Cambodian territory and Thailand was obliged to withdraw all stationed troops there, and by seven to five, that Thailand restore to Cambodia any objects removed from the ruins since 1954.

== Maritime claims ==
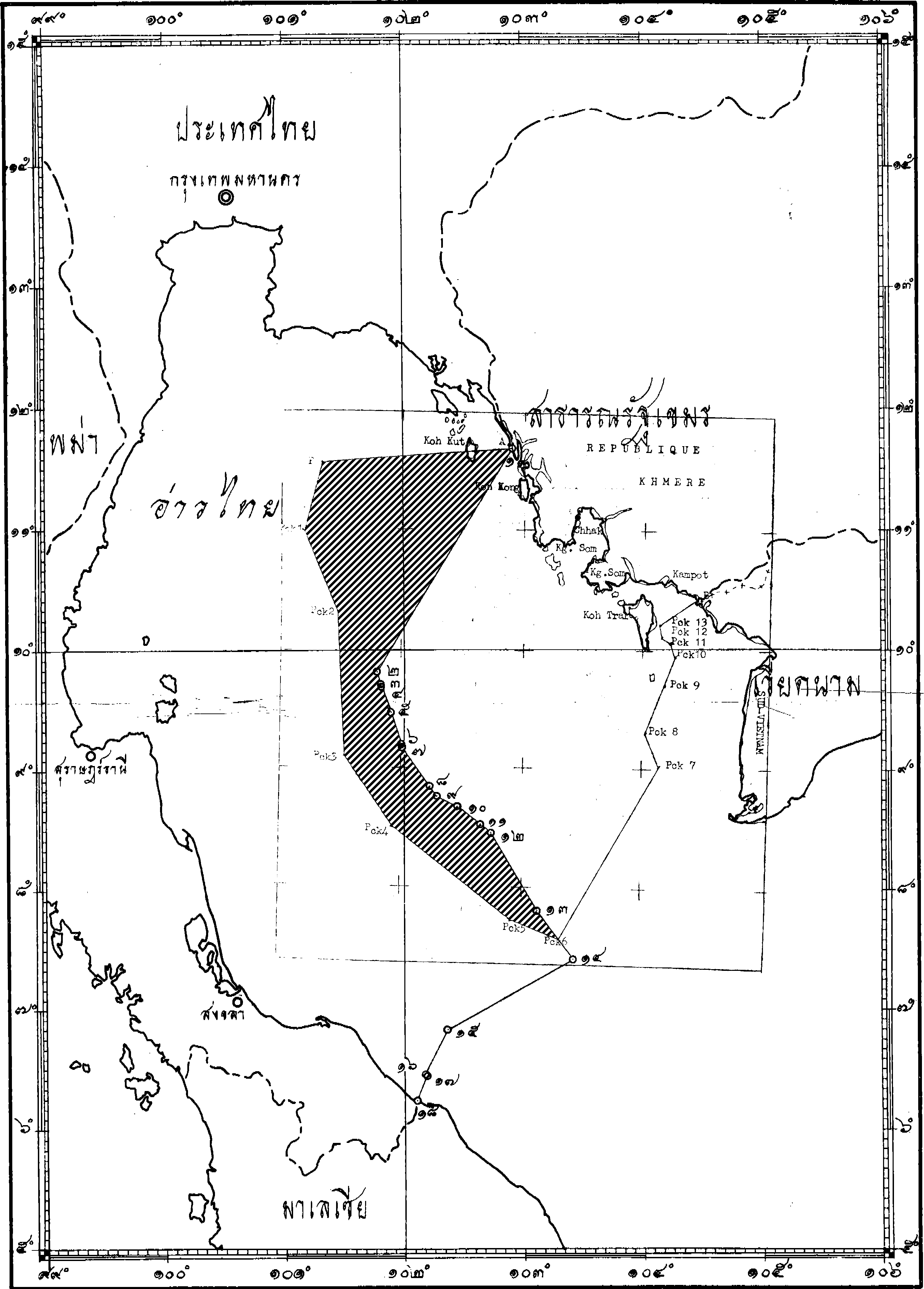
Overlapping continental shelf claims of Thailand and Cambodia

In accordance with the 1958 Convention on the Continental Shelf, of which both countries were signatories, Cambodia and Thailand announced unilateral claims to continental shelf rights in 1972 and 1973, respectively. The two overlap significantly, stemming from different determinations of the equidistant line between Cambodia's coast and Thailand's southern coast on the opposite side of the Gulf of Thailand, as well as from conflicting lateral boundary claims between Thailand's Ko Kut and Cambodia's Koh Kong. Cambodia's claims, in particular, include waters directly around the southern half of Ko Kut in Thailand—a claim not supported by international law and made based on an interpretation of the 1907 treaty that scholars have described as "dubious" and "highly questionable", which Thailand rejects.

The two countries signed a memorandum of understanding in 2001 that agreed to the joint development of the disputed area south of the 11th parallel north and delimitation of the boundary in the area north of the parallel. However, there has been little progress since.

== Joint Boundary Commission ==
In 1997, the two countries' governments agreed to establish a Joint Boundary Commission to oversee the demarcation of their borders, and in 2000, a memorandum of understanding was signed, laying down the framework for process.

== 2008 conflict ==
The dispute resurfaced in 2008 when the Cambodian government was preparing to nominate the Temple of Preah Vihear to the UNESCO as a World Heritage Site. The Thai government of Samak Sundaravej initially signed a communiqué supporting the nomination, but this was seized upon by the anti-government protest group People's Alliance for Democracy to attack the government as part of its protests, which led to the 2008 Thai political crisis. Facing nationalistic sentiment, Samak's government changed its stance and withdrew its support. The situation escalated with military units facing each other in the disputed areas, breaking out into armed clashes on several occasions. Disputes also arose over other overlapping border areas, including those around the ancient Khmer temples of Prasat Ta Muen Thom and Prasat Ta Krabey.

The conflict led to a request for interpretation from the ICJ over the territory covered by the 1962 judgment. In 2013, the court ruled that it included the cliff on which the temple stood (referred to in the case as a promontory), but not all of the surrounding area, including the nearby hill of Phnom Trap.

== 2025 conflict ==
In 2025, tensions increased in several disputed areas along the border, especially with clashes in the Emerald Triangle area on 28 May. Following several diplomatic and political incidents, the crisis broke out into open armed conflict on 24 July. Thailand and Cambodia agreed to an unconditional ceasefire on 28 July, but the ceasefire would be broken with an escalation of hostilities in 8 December. US President Donald Trump claimed that both countries agreed to a ceasefire but border skirmishes have continued. Thailand said a truce would only be possible after Cambodian forces withdraw and landmines were removed, while Cambodia said it must keep fighting to defend its sovereignty. Both sides reported fresh attacks, including air strikes and rocket fire. Many are being displaced in the conflict.

== See also ==
- Cambodia–Thailand relations
