= Bodyguard Headquarters (BHQ) =

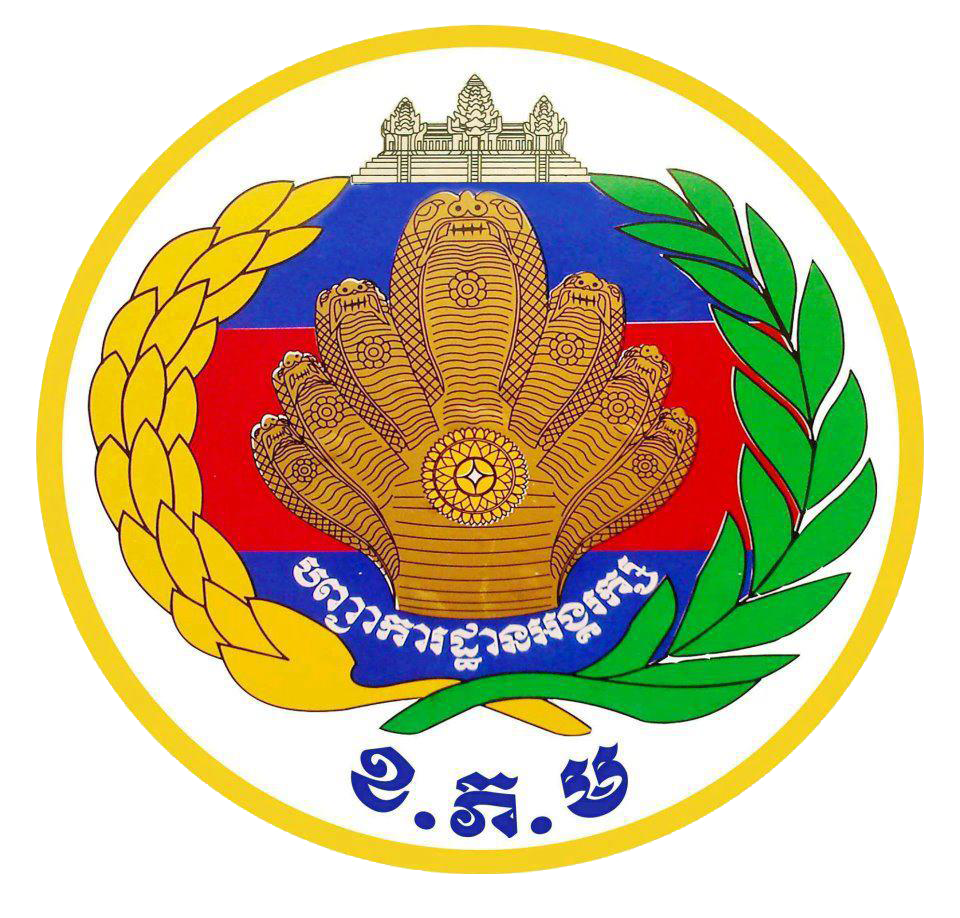
- BHQ emblem
- Founded: 4 September 2009; 16 years ago
- Country: Cambodia
- Branch: Royal Cambodian Army
- Type: Protective security unit
- Role: VIP protection, crisis response
- Size: Classified (estimated several thousand)
- Garrison/HQ: Ta Khmau, Kandal
- Nickname: BHQ
- Anniversaries: 4 September
- Engagements: 2025 Cambodian–Thai border crisis

Commanders
- Commander: General Hing Bun Hieng
- Deputy Commander: Lieutenant General Nob Rothnimol

The Bodyguard Headquarters (BHQ; Khmer: កងអង្គរក្ស) is an elite and heavily armed security unit within the Royal Cambodian Armed Forces (RCAF) tasked with the protection of Cambodia's top government officials, including the Prime Minister of Cambodia, other dignitaries and special interest locations within the Kingdom of Cambodia. Established in 2009, it has grown into one of the most influential armed units in Cambodia.

The BHQ is under the direct command of the Commander-in-chief of the Royal Cambodian Armed Forces and the Minister of National Defence.

== History ==
On September 4, 2009, former Prime Minister Hun Sen established the BHQ in a sub-decree dated. The BHQ was formed to formalize and centralize protection efforts around top leadership figures, particularly then-Prime Minister Hun Sen. Its rapid expansion came amidst heightened political tension and repeated mass protests throughout the 2010s. The origins of the BHQ unit lie in Brigade 70, established by Hun Sen over three decades ago. Brigade 70 played a decisive role in the 1997 coup, dismantling the political and military power base of Prince Norodom Ranariddh and solidifying Hun Sen’s power. Since then, Brigade 70 earned a reputation as the most modern, best-trained, and most technologically equipped combat unit in Cambodia. Following the 9/11 attacks in 2001, Hun Manet, who was then commander of Brigade 70, worked with the United States government to secure military assistance for counter-terrorism efforts. The transition from Samdech Hun Sen to his son Hun Manet saw Brigade 70, formerly under the Army, formally elevated to the "BHQ Bodyguard Unit" under the Supreme Command Headquarters.

The unit is often viewed as fiercely loyal to Hun Sen, and has played a visible role in quelling opposition demonstrations. Members are frequently deployed in uniform or plainclothes to maintain order during political events. BHQ has also engaged in public shows of force, often parading hardware and troops in Phnom Penh to deter protests and project strength. Training support has historically come from foreign sources. In the 1970s, Indonesian Special Forces (Kopassus) trained Khmer Republican commandos. In recent years, Indonesia has extended military assistance again to modern RCAF units including BHQ. General Hing Bunheang, the commander of the Bodyguard Headquarters stated that: “The BHQ is under the direct command of the Royal Cambodian Armed Forces (RCAF) commander-in-chief and the Minister of National Defence. Its main duties are to provide security to all dignitaries as well as members of the National Assembly and Senate." In 2025, the BHQ was seen providing security for prominent Canadian-Burmese Lethwei fighter Dave Leduc in Phnom Penh.

On June 16, 2025, the Cambodian National Television revealed that Hun Sen had deployed the BHQ in response to the Cambodian–Thai border crisis border in Chong Bok.

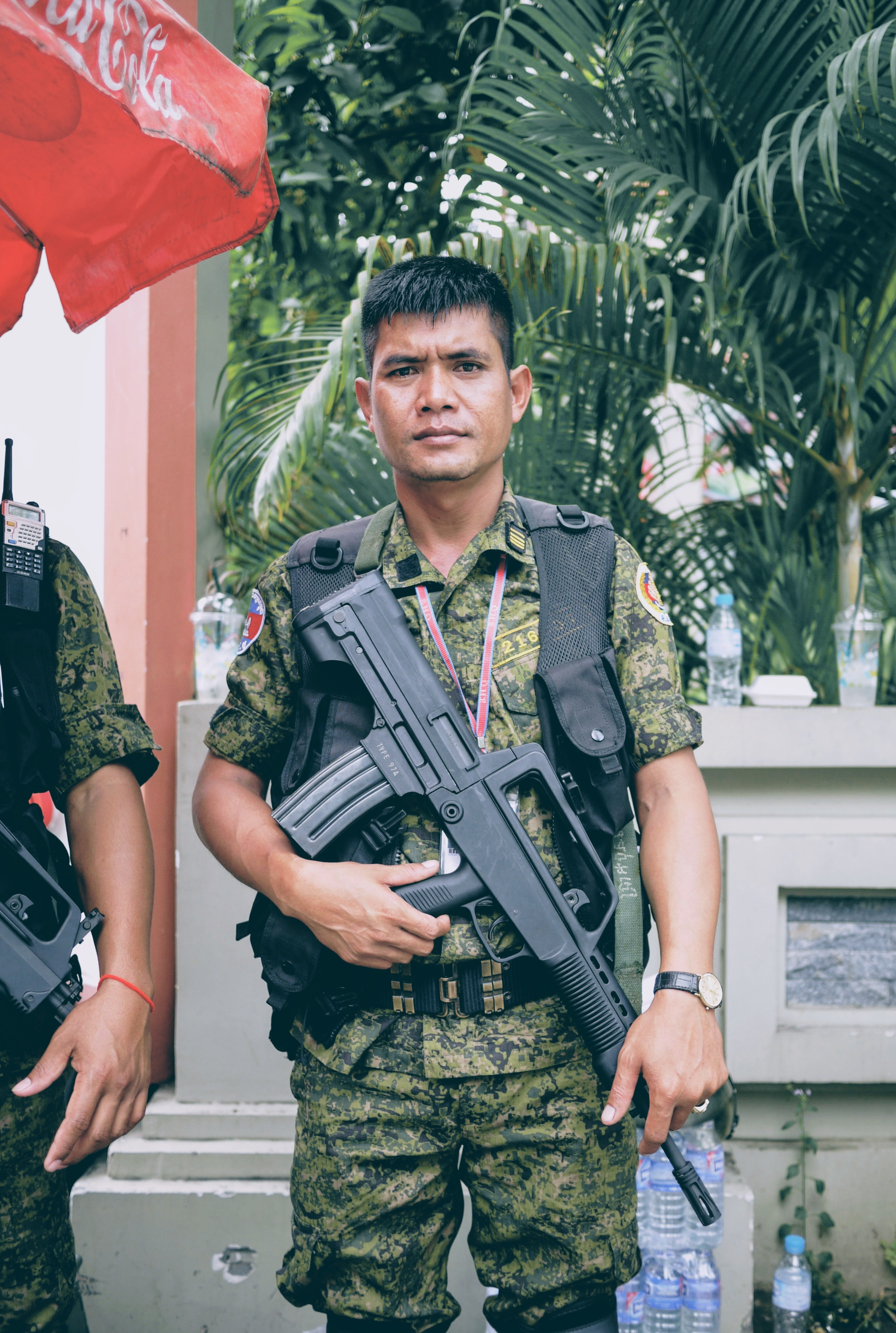
BHQ Unit soldier

== Controversies ==
The unit has been subject to criticism from human rights groups for excessive force and partisanship. In 2023, an officer of the BHQ was arrested for murdering his wife.

== Volleyball Team ==
Beyond its security function, BHQ maintains an active presence in national sports. Its volleyball team won back-to-back championships in 2023 and 2024, with key contributions from star player Luvi. In 2025, the BHQ won the Techo Volleyball Cambodia League (TVCL), by defeating the Visakha volleyball club, mainly composed of members of the Cambodia men's national volleyball team.
