= 2025 Cambodian–Thai border crisis =

Border conflict in Southeast Asia

- Part of the Cambodia–Thailand border dispute and the aftermath of the Indochina wars
- Location of Cambodia (green) and Thailand (orange)
Date	Border crisis: 28 May – 26 October 2025 (4 months and 4 weeks); 10 November – 7 December 2025 (3 weeks and 6 days); Border conflicts: 24–28 July 2025 (4 days); 8–27 December 2025 (2 weeks and 5 days)
Location	Cambodia and Thailand
Result	Ceasefire
Territorial changes	Thailand occupies most of the contested areas and allegedly encroaches past contested zones into Cambodia: Prasat Ta Krabey and Prasat Ta Muen Thom remain under the control of Thai forces since December 2025

Belligerents
Cambodia	Thailand

Commanders and leaders
Hun Sen; Hun Manet; Tea Seiha; Vong Pisen; Eth Sarath; Mao Sophan; Heng Pov; Srey Deuk; Hing Bun Hieng; Duong Somneang †; Jin Chan †; Youn Seung †; Cham Rithy †; Heng Kom San †	Anutin Charnvirakul (since 7 September); Natthaphon Narkphanit; Phana Khlaeoplotthuk; Ukris Boontanondha (since 1 October); Pairote Fuengchan (since 1 October); Seksan Kantha (since 1 October); Weerayut Raksin (since 1 October); Worayot Leuangsuwan (since 1 October); Former leaders: Paetongtarn Shinawatra (until 1 July) (Note: Suspended following the Thailand–Cambodia phone call leak); Phumtham Wechayachai (until 7 September); Songwit Noonpakdee (until 30 September); Jirapol Wongwit (until 30 September); Punpakdee Pattanakul (until 30 September); Boonsin Padklang (until 30 September); Amarit Bunsuya (until 30 September)

Units involved
Royal Cambodian Armed Forces; Royal Cambodian Army; Bodyguard Headquarters; Counter Assault Unit; Artillery Command	Royal Thai Armed Forces; Royal Thai Army; Royal Thai Air Force; Royal Thai Navy; Royal Thai Marine Corps; Royal Thai Police

Strength
Pre-conflict total; 124,300 military personnel; 67,000 paramilitary personnel	Pre-conflict total; 560,850 military and reserve personnel; 138,700 paramilitary personnel

Casualties and losses
Undisclosed (Note: 1 killed in May 5 killed in July and others undisclosed due to military reasons); 20 soldiers captured (Note: 2 released in July, and 18 released in December); Per Cambodian Local sources: 73 soldiers killed (Note: Around August, Khmer Times reported that a solemn ceremony was held to honor fallen soldiers, featuring an exhibition of photographs of the 44 soldiers who died in the conflict . And later in December, Cambodian local media and provincial administrations reported that at least 28 soldiers and one border guard had been killed in action in which 13 from Preah Vihear province and 16 from Siem Reap province which make a total of 73 killed); 448+ soldiers injured; independent analysis: 130 - 160+ military and border police personnel killed (Note: Nikkei Asia compiled toll from Cambodian government social media and official websites); Per Thailand: c. 505 soldiers killed; Equipment losses: 6 to 13 T-55 tanks destroyed (Note: Sources:); 10 vehicles destroyed; 7 artillery pieces destroyed; 1 BM-21 destroyed; 4 AAA destroyed	43 soldiers killed (Note: 16 KIA (july) and 26 KIA (December) a total of 42 Killed (incl. 2 non-hostile deaths) 1 non-hostile death (September 2026)); 535+ soldiers injured; Equipment losses: 3 VT-4 tanks damaged; 1 BTR-3 damaged; 1 vehicle abandoned; 2 UAV shot down; 1 Unknown AFV (Note: Possibly a Type 85) destroyed; Per Cambodia: 1+ spy captured
- Civilian casualties: 39 Cambodian civilians and 17 Thai civilians killed and 47 other Thai civilians died from indirect deaths.; 122+ Cambodian civilians and 39+ Thai civilians injured.; 1 Lao national killed.; 1 Chinese national injured.; more than half a million displaced(November and December); 20,000+ Cambodian civilians remain displaced (2026)

The territorial dispute between Cambodia and Thailand escalated into a direct armed confrontation on 24 July 2025 along the Cambodia–Thailand border. Although both governments subsequently agreed to an unconditional ceasefire on 28 July 2025, hostilities later resumed in December, during which Thai forces seized several towns and strategic hills in contested areas near the frontier.

Tensions had sharply increased on 23 July, when a Thai soldier was seriously injured after stepping on a PMN-2 anti-personnel landmine in Nam Yuen district, Ubon Ratchathani province. The incident served as the immediate trigger for wider hostilities. On the following day, direct armed clashes erupted across multiple sectors of the border. Thai media widely reported that Cambodia's BM-21 multiple rocket launchers struck Thai residential neighbourhoods, a hospital, and a gas station, which acted as the catalyst for the outbreak of full-scale fighting on 24 July 2025. Both sides asserted that their actions were taken in self-defence and accused the other of initiating the conflict. The clashes resulted in the displacement of more than 200,000 civilians across northeastern Thailand and northern Cambodia.

In response, the Royal Thai Air Force (RTAF) deployed F-16 fighter aircraft to conduct airstrikes against Cambodian military installations along the border, marking the first time that the RTAF had engaged in combat operations since the Thai–Laotian Border War (1987–88). The escalation raised regional and international concern, prompting calls from ASEAN and the United Nations for restraint and mediation. The United States and Malaysia also expressed concern over the fighting and called on both parties to de-escalate tensions through diplomatic means. Although tensions gradually eased under external diplomatic pressure, the July 2025 airstrikes and ground engagements were regarded as among the most intense episodes in the Cambodia–Thailand border dispute since the Temple of Preah Vihear case, with significant implications for the stability and security of mainland Southeast Asia.

Fighting resumed on 7 December 2025, when Cambodian and Thai forces engaged in a brief 30-minute border skirmish. On the following day, Thailand conducted renewed ground operations and F-16 air missions against multiple positions inside Cambodia by deploying airstrikes against Cambodian soldiers. On 10 December, the Royal Thai Army (RTA) launched "Operation Sattawat", during which it seized a number of localities in northern Cambodia.

The fighting ended with another ceasefire on 27 December, with a 72-hour monitoring period to ensure compliance. Thailand later released 18 Cambodian soldiers who had been captured in the July clashes. The ceasefire remains in effect as of May 2026, though sporadic incidents and general mistrust remain.

== Background ==
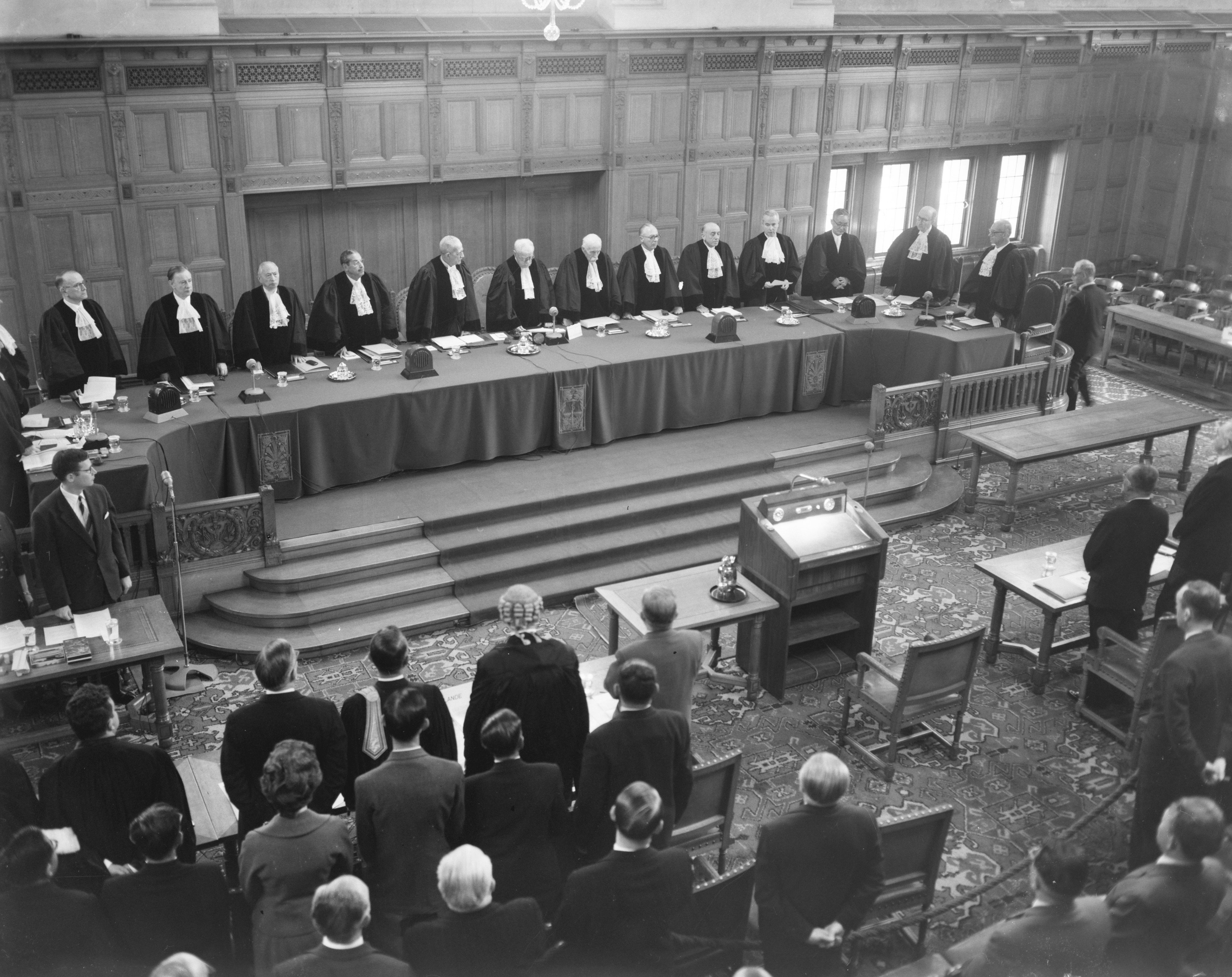
Temple of Preah Vihear case during hearings at the International Court of Justice in 1961

The border dispute between Cambodia and Thailand originates from ambiguities in the boundary demarcations established under the 1904 and 1907 agreements, which sought to define the frontier between the Kingdom of Siam (modern Thailand) and the French Third Republic in French Indochina, which included Cambodia. These treaty maps and survey documents produced by French colonial authorities were often imprecise, leading to overlapping claims over several highland areas and strategic passes.

Following Cambodia's independence from France in 1953, the sovereignty of the Preah Vihear temple complex became a focal point of the dispute. The International Court of Justice (ICJ) issued a ruling in 1962 awarding the temple itself to Cambodia, citing historical maps and French survey documentation. However, the court did not clearly delineate the surrounding territory, leaving the adjacent highlands, cliffs, and approaches to the temple in a state of legal and military uncertainty.

The dispute remained largely dormant until the late 20th century, when both Thai and Khmer sentiments intensified the sensitivity over border sovereignty. From 2008 to 2011, renewed military clashes erupted, including artillery exchanges, patrol skirmishes, and limited incursions, resulting in multiple fatalities and injuries on both sides. These clashes underscored the enduring volatility of the area and the challenge of reconciling historical treaties with contemporary nationalist claims.

Despite repeated skirmishes, the ICJ reaffirmed its 1962 ruling, confirming Cambodian sovereignty over the temple complex. Nevertheless, ambiguities in territorial limits and the absence of a mutually agreed border demarcation continued to fuel tension, making the region a recurring flashpoint for military and diplomatic crises between the two nations. Analysts emphasize that these disputes are intertwined with domestic politics, historical memory, and the strategic value of the highlands overlooking the Khao Phra Wihan National Park and surrounding areas.

== Prelude ==
On 13 February 2025, Thai soldiers prevented Cambodian tourists from singing the Cambodian national anthem at the disputed Prasat Ta Muen Thom. On 28 May, Cambodian and Thai soldiers briefly exchanged fire between each other, resulting in the death of one Cambodian soldier. Attempts to de-escalate failed, with continued tensions leading to border checkpoint closures. Discussions between the Cambodian and Thai militaries were held on 29 May. Cambodian prime minister Hun Manet responded to the 28 May incident by seeking a ruling from the International Court of Justice (ICJ), saying that he did not want to see a conflict with Thailand. Thai defense minister Phumtham Wechayachai said that neither side wanted to escalate the conflict and that it had been resolved.

=== Emerald Triangle skirmish ===
On 28 May, Cambodian and Thai soldiers engaged in a brief 10-minute skirmish, resulting in the death of one Cambodian soldier, Second Lieutenant Suon Roun. The skirmish occurred in the Emerald Triangle along the border of Cambodia's Preah Vihear province and Thailand's Ubon Ratchathani province. Both countries claimed each other was the aggressor. Cambodian military spokesperson Mao Phalla claimed that Thai soldiers were the first to open fire on Cambodian soldiers in a trench that had been in use for a while. Meanwhile, Thai military spokesperson Winthai Suvaree, claimed that Thai soldiers had attempted to persuade the Cambodian soldiers to withdraw before the Cambodians opened fire.

=== Attempts to de-escalate and continued tensions ===
Following the clash in the Emerald Triangle, Manet responded by announcing the initiation of proceedings to submit the matter to the ICJ, while affirming he did not wish for conflict with Thailand. On the Thai side, Phumtham stated that neither side wished for the situation to escalate further and confirmed that the incident had already been resolved. On 29 May, a meeting was held between General Phana Khlaeoplotthuk, the commander-in-chief of the Royal Thai Army (RTA), and General Mao Sophan, the commander-in-chief of the Royal Cambodian Army, to coordinate efforts to reduce tensions and prevent future incidents.

Bilateral talks to de-escalate were held on 5 June, but failed to culminate to anything concrete. Phumtham claimed that Cambodia had rejected Thailand's proposals and that, on 7 June, Thailand would reinforce its military presence on the border. Separately on the same date, the Thai army claimed that Cambodian civilians were making frequent incursions into Thai territory and that "these provocations, and the buildup of military forces, indicate a clear intent to use force." On 17 June, Cambodia announced that they have banned the imports of fruits and soap operas from Thailand.

=== Leak of phone conversation ===
On 15 June 2025, Thai prime minister Paetongtarn Shinawatra contacted Khleang Huot, deputy governor of Phnom Penh, to request his assistance as an interpreter and intermediary for an informal conversation with Cambodian Senate president Hun Sen. The discussion was conducted informally and without official protocol or record by either government. Paetongtarn was unaware that the conversation was being recorded. On 18 June 2025, Hun Sen released the audio clip to the public and distributed it among 80 officials without prior notice to the Thai side, triggering political repercussions in Thailand.

Following the disclosure, the Stock Exchange of Thailand (SET) index declined for three consecutive trading days, with a cumulative fall of −4.17%. On the evening of 18 June 2025 at 20:30, the Bhumjaithai Party, a key coalition partner, announced its withdrawal from the government, depriving the Paetongtarn cabinet of its parliamentary majority and precipitating a political crisis.

The leaked audio also drew attention to Paetongtarn's remarks regarding the Royal Thai Armed Forces, in which she referred to the military as being on the opposing side to her government. The comments were widely interpreted as referring to Lieutenant General Boonsin Padklang, the commander of the 2nd Army Area.

=== Border crossing closures ===
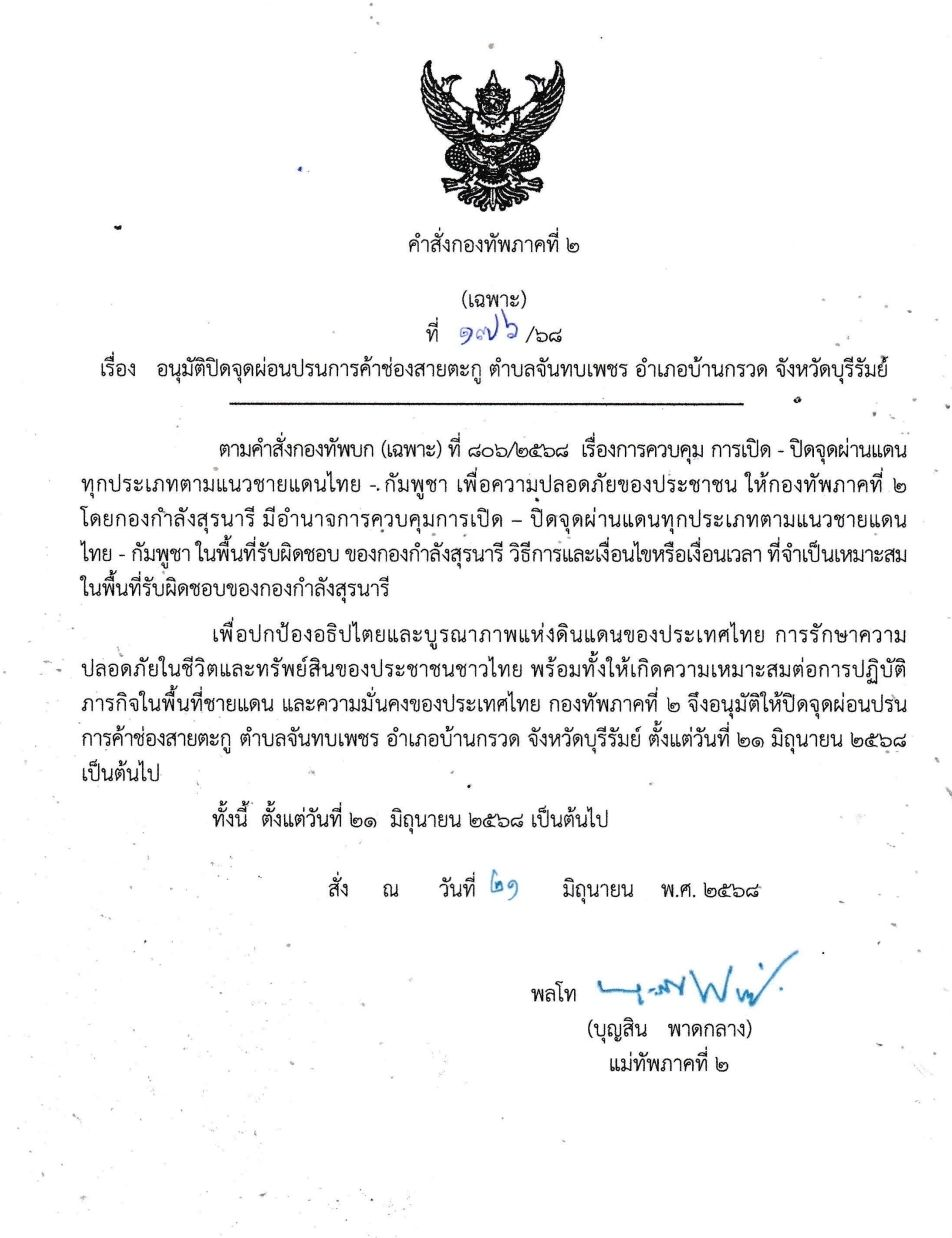
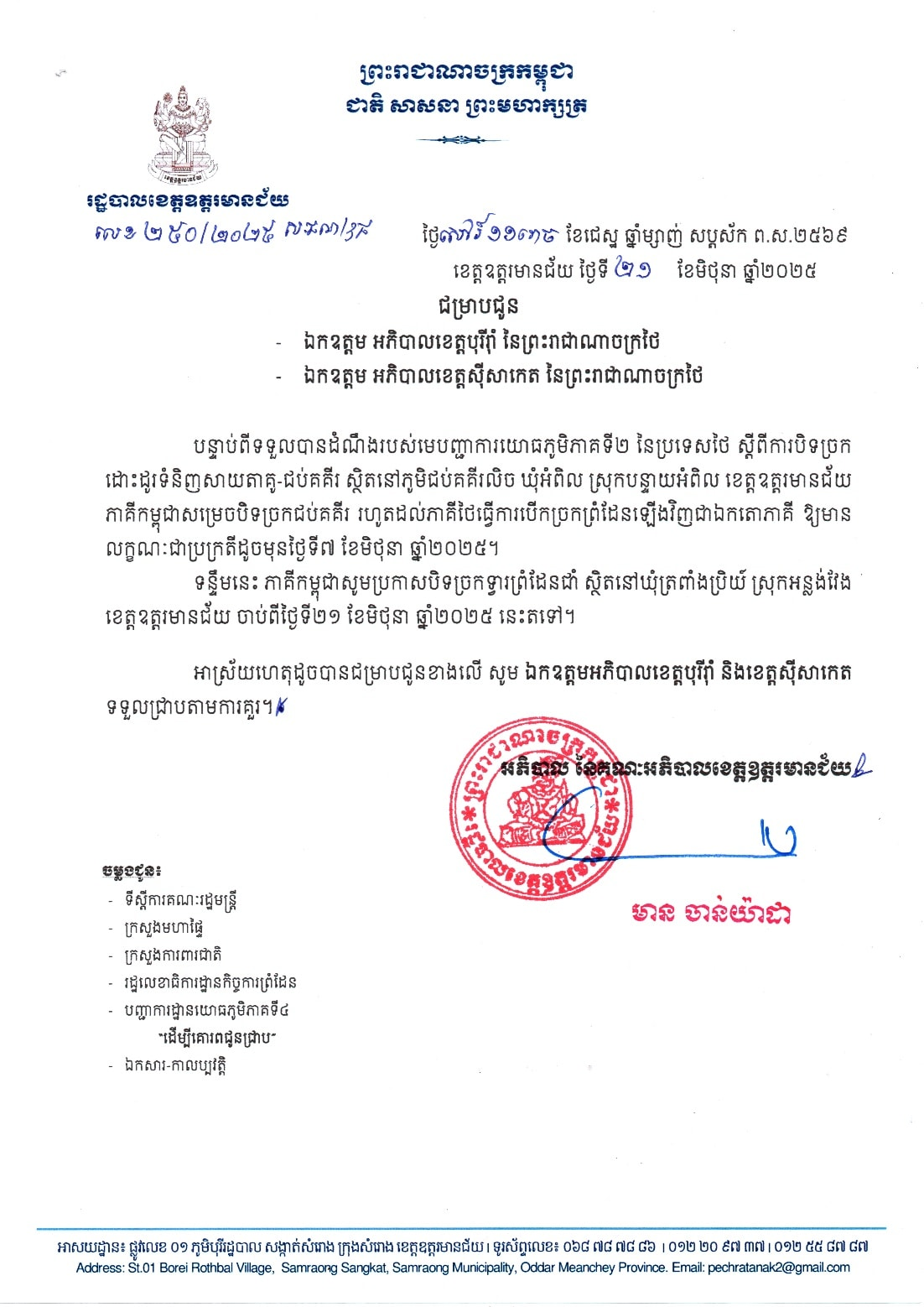
Thailand's first border closure order (left) and Cambodia's order (right)

Trat province became subject to new border management measures after the Ministry of Defence delegated authority over border areas to the Royal Thai Army (RTA), following a meeting of the National Security Council (NSC) on 7 June 2025. The proposal was put forward by Prime Minister Paetongtarn.

On the evening of 21 June 2025, Boonsin approved the indefinite closure of the Chong Sai Taku temporary border crossing in Ban Kruat district, Buriram province, citing national security and operational reasons.

In response, at 07:00 on 22 June 2025, Manet announced via his official Facebook page the closure of the Ban Chup Koki checkpoint in Banteay Ampil district, Oddar Meanchey province, opposite Thailand's Chong Sai Taku crossing, as well as the Choam checkpoint in Anlong Veng District, opposite Thailand's Chong Sa-ngam permanent border crossing in Phu Sing district, Sisaket province.

Blue: Thailand's permanent checkpoints
Red: Thailand's trade checkpoints

On 23 June 2025, at 15:20, Paetongtarn gave a press briefing following a meeting on measures to combat transnational crime, joined by General Songwit Noonpakdee, Chief of Defence Forces, Police General Thatchai Pitaneelabutr, Inspector-General of the Royal Thai Police, and other agencies. Cambodia was identified as a centre of transnational crime affecting the region, based on United Nations reports. The government announced stricter controls at border crossings in all seven Thai provinces bordering Cambodia and increased scrutiny of flights to Siem Reap–Angkor International Airport. These measures affected Emirates, which had recently launched a new route from Suvarnabhumi Airport on 3 June.

The Thai government also ordered closer scrutiny of financial networks linked to cross-border crime and measures to suppress scams, alongside economic relief for affected sectors, including industry, services, and agriculture.

Later that day, Thailand ordered the closure of all border crossings along the Cambodia–Thailand border under authority delegated by the NSC to the army. At 19:10, the 1st Army Area ordered the suspension of vehicle and passenger movement at crossings in Sa Kaeo province, with exceptions for humanitarian purposes. The 2nd Army Area issued a similar order for Surin, Sisaket, and Buriram provinces, allowing limited trade in agricultural products and essential goods. The Chanthaburi and Trat Border Protection Command then issued an order covering Chanthaburi and Trat, likewise restricting crossings except for humanitarian purposes and essential trade.

All orders cited reasons related to Thailand's campaign against transnational crime, including human trafficking and call center syndicates, and the protection of citizens' lives and property and national sovereignty.

=== Landmine incident ===
Three RTA soldiers suffered injuries during a patrol in the Emerald Triangle area when they accidentally stepped on a landmine. It was initially speculated that the mine was left over from the Cold War, however later evidence suggested that they were newer Russian PMN-2 mines. One of the injured, Private Thanapat Huaiwan, lost his left leg. Thailand said it was planning to take this matter to the United Nations, as Cambodia is a signatory to the Ottawa Treaty.

Heng Ratana, representative of the Cambodian Mine Action Center, claimed in a Facebook post that "In this case of new Landmines recently laid in Thailand there are a number of Social Media in Thailand have shown their armed forces did it..." and to instead take the matter to the ICJ. The RTA accused Cambodia of spreading misinformation, and that footage provided by Cambodian sources were of Thai soldiers defusing mines.

Following demining operations by the RTA, at least two additional PMN-2 mines were discovered near the original site of the explosion. The mines were described to be in "New and Ready to deploy conditions". Additionally, the RTA has condemned this as a "Clear Violation of Thailand's sovereignty" and called on other nations to condemn Cambodia.

On 23 July 2025, another Thai patrol group consisting of five soldiers were injured by a Cambodian mine, including one, Master Sergeant First Class Phichitchai Boonchola, losing his right leg. The incident occurred at Nam Yuen district, Ubon Ratchathani province. As a response, the RTA announced a message that it severely condemned the "inhumane act which is a violation of Human rights and International Agreements" and that it was an "Act which is a threat to peace and stability in the border region."

The RTA has subsequently announced it would close four border checkpoints and two temples (Prasat Ta Muen Thom and Prasat Ta Khwai) indefinitely and has put its forces in the area at combat readiness.

Later on 23 July 2025, Thailand downgraded diplomatic ties with Cambodia. Thailand recalled its ambassador from Phnom Penh and expelled Cambodia's envoy from Bangkok.

== Order of battle ==
=== Cambodia ===
- Royal Cambodian Armed Forces
  - Royal Cambodian Army
    - 4th Military Region
        - 41st Brigade
        - 42nd Brigade
      - 3rd Intervention Division
        - 7th Brigade
        - 8th Brigade
        - 9th Brigade
      - 2nd Intervention Division
        - 4th Brigade
        - 5th Brigade
        - 6th Brigade
    - 5th Military Region
      - 51th Brigade
      - 10th Special Assault Brigade
    - Cambodian Special Forces
  - Bodyguard Headquarters
  - Counter Assault Unit
  - Artillery Command

=== Thailand ===
- Royal Thai Armed Forces
  - Royal Thai Army
    - Thahan Phran
      - 26th Ranger Forces Regiment
    - RTA Special Warfare Command
      - 1st Special Forces Regiment
      - 2nd Special Forces Regiment
      - 3rd Special Forces Regiment
        - Ranger Battalion
        - Special Operations Battalion
    - Army Air Defense Command
    - Artillery Division
    - 1st Army Area
      - Burapa Command
      - 1st Division, King's Guard
        - 31st Infantry Brigade, King's Royal Guard
        - 4th Armoured Battalion, King's Royal Guard
        - 1st Engineer Battalion, King's Royal Guard
      - 2nd Infantry Division
        - 2nd Infantry Brigade, Queen's Guard
        - 12th Mechanised Infantry Brigade, Queen's Guard
        - 21st Infantry Brigade, Queen's Guard
        - 2nd Cavalry Squadorn, Queen's Guard
        - 30th Cavalry Squadron, Queen's Guard
      - 9th Infantry Division
      - 11th Infantry Division
        - 112th Mechanised Infantry Brigade
      - 2nd Cavalry Division, King's Royal Guard
        - 1st Armoured Brigade, King's Royal Guard
        - 4th Armoured Brigade, King's Royal Guard
        - 5th Armoured Brigade, King's Royal Guard
    - 2nd Army Area
      - Suranaree Command
      - 3rd Infantry Division
      - 6th Infantry Division
      - 3rd Cavalry Division
    - 3rd Army Area
      - 1st Cavalry Division
        - 3rd Armoured Brigade
  - Royal Thai Air Force
    - Wing 1 Nakhon Ratchasima
    - Wing 4 Takhli
    - Wing 7 Surat Thani
    - Wing 21 Ubon Ratchathani
  - Royal Thai Navy
    - Royal Thai Navy SEALs
    - Royal Thai Marine Corps
      - 1st Marine Division
        - 1st Infantry Regiment, 1st Marine Division
        - RTMC Reconnaissance Battalion
        - Paramilitary Marine Regiment
    - Royal Thai Fleet
    - Air and Coastal Defense Command
    - Chanthaburi and Trat Border Defense Command
- (Thailand) Royal Thai Police
  - Metropolitan Police Bureau
    - Protection and Crowds Control Division
  - Provincial Police Region 2
  - Provincial Police Region 3
  - Border Patrol Police
  - Special Operation Unit

== July clashes ==
Both parties have attributed responsibility for initiating hostilities on 24 July 2025 to one another. According to Thailand, at least 16 soldiers and 14 civilians were killed, while 14 soldiers and 32 civilians were injured. An additional 149,264 civilians were evacuated. According to Cambodia's Ministry of National Defence, 5 soldiers and 8 civilians were killed, and 21 soldiers along with over 50 civilians were injured. As of 27 July, the Cambodian defense ministry reported that 134,707 individuals had been displaced across four border provinces, many relocated under emergency conditions.

=== 24 July ===
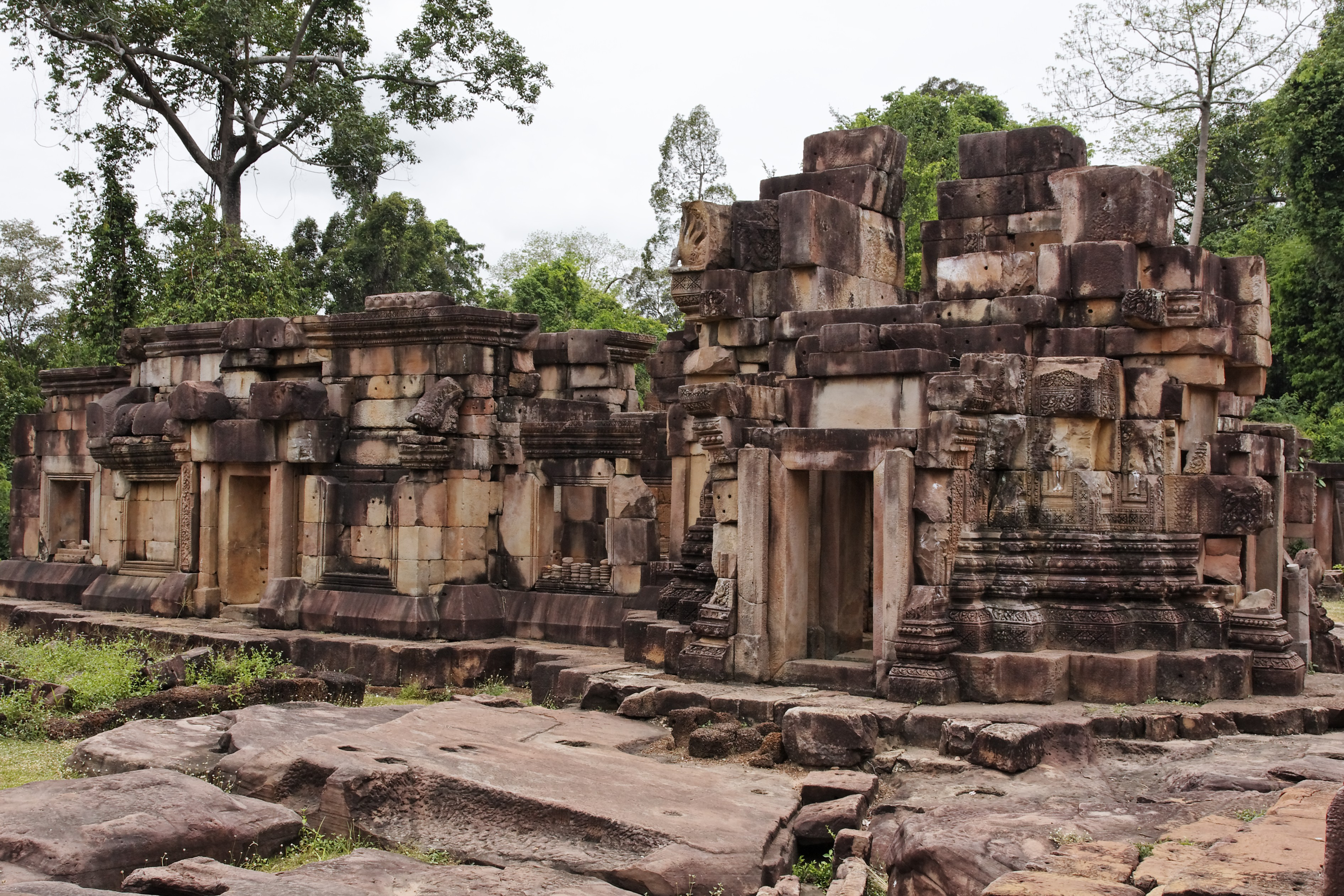
Prasat Ta Muen Thom

In the early morning of 24 July 2025, Thai forces reported the presence of Cambodian unmanned aerial vehicles (UAVs) near the Thai-administered Prasat Ta Muen Thom temple. Thai military sources claimed that six armed Cambodian soldiers were approaching the barbed wire in front of the Thai base, prompting Cambodian troops to allegedly open fire approximately 200 meters east of the temple.

Cambodia accused Thai forces of launching an armed assault on Cambodian positions and restricting public access to Ta Muen Thom Temple, with a spokesperson stating that Cambodian troops acted strictly within self-defense against an unprovoked incursion.

By mid-morning, Thai authorities reported that Cambodia fired a BM-21 multiple rocket launcher toward Prasat Don Tuan near a residential area. Cambodian forces allegedly attempted to advance near Ta Kwai Temple, prompting Thai artillery counter-fire.

By 10:58 a.m., six Royal Thai Air Force (RTAF) F-16 fighter jets bombed Cambodian positions in Chong An Ma, reportedly destroying command posts of Cambodia's 8th and 9th Infantry Divisions. Thai citizens in Cambodia were advised to evacuate, and the Thai-Cambodian border was closed.

Civilian areas were heavily affected, including a gas station in Sisaket province struck by BM-21 rockets, killing at least eight, including an 8-year-old child. The Phnom Dongrak hospital was damaged, resulting in multiple injuries and evacuation of patients.

In the afternoon, Thai forces claimed to have destroyed two Cambodian tanks at Khao Sattasom and launched Operation Yuttha Bodin, a coordinated land and air offensive commanded by General Phana Khlaeoplotthuk. Cambodian Senate president Hun Sen defended military actions, claiming to participate in command decisions via video link. Around 5,000 civilians were evacuated from Oddar Meanchey province, with at least four Cambodian civilians wounded.

Cambodian forces reportedly occupied Prasat Ta Khwai, Emerald Triangle area, and Prasat Ta Muen Thom after engagements with Thai troops.

=== 25 July ===
Clashes continued on 25 July in Preah Vihear and Prasat Ta Khwai areas. Heavy artillery fire was reported in border areas of Oddar Meanchey and Preah Vihear, with both sides accusing each other of initiating hostilities.

Thai acting prime minister Phumtham Wechayachai warned the conflict could escalate into full-scale war. Thailand rejected offers of third-party mediation from the United States, China, and Malaysia, opting for bilateral talks.

Both sides reportedly used heavy artillery and cluster munitions, with Thai forces claiming to have struck seven locations in Cambodia. Martial law was declared in Thailand in eight districts along the Cambodian border.

=== 26 July ===
On 26 July 2025, the Royal Thai Navy (RTN) reported that Cambodian troops had launched a new offensive in the area of Ban Chamrak, Trat province, attacking three points along the border. Clashes were reported in Chanthaburi and Trat provinces beginning at 5:10 a.m. Early Thai artillery strikes on Ekphap Village, Thmar Da Commune, and Veal Veng District in Cambodia reportedly injured three civilians. Cambodia condemned the attacks as unprovoked assaults on civilians.

In response, the RTN launched Operation Trat Phikhat Phairi 1, claiming to have repelled Cambodian advances by 5:40 a.m. On the same day, ten artillery shells reportedly landed in Lao territory during clashes, causing damage. The Royal Thai Army (RTA) initially blamed Cambodia but later stated it was unclear which side fired the shells. Cambodia denied responsibility, accusing Thailand of spreading misinformation.

Thai forces reportedly recaptured Phu Makeua, and Major General Duang Samneang, commander of Cambodia's 7th Division, was killed by artillery fire in the Chong Ta Thao–Phu Makhuea area.

Unidentified aerial vehicles were reported in Khlong Yai, prompting authorities to urge public vigilance. At 8:20 a.m., the RTN deployed a task force of four vessels, including fast attack and patrol gunboats, near Ko Kut district and Ban Hat Lek. The Royal Thai Air Force (RTAF) conducted airstrikes with two F-16s and two Gripens on Cambodian strategic locations near Prasat Ta Khwai in Surin province.

Thailand claimed to have captured areas in Ta Phraya District and Khok Sung District while intensifying attacks across multiple border locations. Cambodia implemented defensive measures in response.

=== 27 July ===
On 27 July 2025, Cambodia accused the Royal Thai Army (RTA) of continuing shelling Cambodian territory, targeting civilian and religious infrastructure, despite phone calls between Phumtham and Manet, as well as U.S. president Donald Trump the previous night. Cambodian sources reported ongoing Thai shelling and bombings in Samraong, Oddar Meanchey province, and other civilian locations. Thai media released images showing Cambodian artillery damage to a clinic in Sisaket province.

At 4:30 a.m., Thailand reported that Cambodian troops fired at Thai forces at Prasat Ta Khwai. At 6:40 a.m., Cambodian forces launched heavy assaults on Thai positions in Phanom Dong Rak district, Surin province. Reports indicated that Cambodia fired BM-21 Grad rockets into Prasat Ta Muen Thom. Thai forces claimed to have recaptured Chong Ahn Ma early in the morning.

Cambodia's Ministry of Culture and Fine Arts condemned Thai shelling of Preah Vihear, a UNESCO World Heritage Site, calling for international action to protect shared cultural heritage.

On the same day, Thailand returned the remains of 12 Cambodian soldiers as a gesture of battlefield respect.

In the afternoon, The Royal Thai Army clarified reports of Thai soldiers targeting a Cambodian PHL-03 multiple rocket launcher, stating it was intelligence information and they had not yet received a report. A source in the 2nd Army Region admitted to firing at the target area but said they had not yet been able to verify if it was successful. Two squadrons of RTAF F-16s bombed strategic locations in Prasat Ta Muen Thom and Prasat Ta Khwai, further intensifying the conflict along the disputed border.

== First ceasefire ==
Donald J. Trump
@realDonaldTrump

Just spoke to the Prime Minister of Cambodia relative to stopping the War with Thailand. I am calling the Acting Prime Minister of Thailand, right now, to likewise request a Ceasefire, and END to the War, which is currently raging. We happen to be, by coincidence, currently dealing on Trade with both Countries, but do not want to make any Deal, with either Country, if they are fighting – And I have told them so! The call with Thailand is being made momentarily. The call with Cambodia has ended, but expect to call back regarding War stoppage and Ceasefire based on what Thailand has to say. I am trying to simplify a complex situation! Many people are being killed in this War, but it very much reminds me of the Conflict between Pakistan and India, which was brought to a successful halt.

26 July 2025

=== 28 July ===
On 28 July 2025, as Cambodia and Thailand prepared to meet for ceasefire talks in Malaysia, Cambodian sources reported that the Thai military had intensified its offensive in the early morning hours across at least eight sectors along the border. Cambodia also accused Thailand of conducting a disinformation campaign aimed at distorting the realities of the conflict and misleading the international community. Thai media reported that clashes began around 3 a.m. in Surin province. Later that morning, Surin province was officially declared a disaster area.

Cambodia falsely alleged that Thailand had used chemical weapons during a morning assault as Thailand strongly denied the accusation, describing it as groundless and part of a wider pattern of disinformation, propaganda. The accompanying claim that Thai forces had dropped poison gas was circulated with an image of a water bomber releasing pink fire retardant, which fact-checkers later traced to a Reuters photograph of a wildfire in California from January 2025. Hours before the ceasefire was set to begin, Thai sources reported heavy fighting along the frontline, particularly near Prasat Ta Khwai and Chong Ahn Ma. Thai sources further claimed that the Bodyguard Headquarters (BHQ), the personal protective security unit of Hun Sen, became involved in combat at Prasat Ta Khwai.

=== 29–30 July ===
On 29 July 2025, the Royal Thai Army (RTA) reported that Cambodia had violated the ceasefire agreement. Later that day, the RTA released images and videos showing captured Cambodian prisoners of war (POWs), reporting a total of 18 captured. The footage depicted the POWs being provided with food and water, with the RTA emphasizing that it "continues to uphold human rights principles, international humanitarian law, and the obligations of Thailand under the Geneva Conventions regarding the proper treatment of enemy soldiers and the deceased." In the evening, Thai sources reiterated that Cambodia had violated the ceasefire, claiming that Cambodian forces launched another assault near the Chong Ahn Ma and Phu Makuea areas.

On 30 July 2025, a Cambodian military commander addressed 13 foreign military attachés and diplomats, accusing Thai forces of abducting 20 Cambodian soldiers during the handshake process following the ceasefire. According to the statement, one soldier escaped while two were suspected to have been killed. Cambodia also denied allegations that it had violated the ceasefire, asserting its commitment to a "peaceful resolution" and transparency, and facilitated a visit to the An Seh border area on 30 July for foreign diplomats and military attachés.

On the same day, the Royal Thai Navy reported sporadic Cambodian small-arms fire targeting Thai positions, particularly near Preah Vihear and Phu Makhuea. Cambodian forces were also reported to have used grenade launchers against Thai positions at Pha Mor E Dang.

Later, footage emerged showing Cambodian troops occupying Prasat Ta Khwai. In response, the RTA revised earlier claims, stating that Thai forces had not captured the temple itself but controlled a nearby strategic area, hill 350. The RTA cited the presence of Cambodian minefields as hindering their operations and explained that previous announcements regarding the temple's capture resulted from communication errors. The same footage also showed Cambodian soldiers in possession of PMN-2 mines, which constitute a violation of the Ottawa Treaty.

=== 1–5 August ===
On 1 August 2025, Thailand released two captured Cambodian soldiers, Second Lieutenant Ang Oeung and Master Sergeant Mom Vuthy, prompting the Cambodian government to demand the full release of all its soldiers held by Thai forces. Reports indicated that one of the released soldiers had suffered a broken arm, while the other displayed signs of psychological trauma, reportedly post-traumatic stress disorder (PTSD). Thai sources stated that the soldiers were sent back after medical experts determined that their condition would worsen if they did not receive care from their families. Both soldiers were reported to have shown no signs of injury prior to entering battle. The Royal Thai Army (RTA) stated that the release procedures complied with the Third Geneva Convention. However, the POWs were reportedly required to swear an oath that they would "never fight against Thailand again."

On 2 August 2025, the Royal Thai Army imposed a temporary nationwide ban on the operation of drones following reports of alleged attempts to use drones to spy on military positions. Army personnel were authorized to employ anti-drone systems to enforce the restriction. On 3 August 2025, Cambodia's Ministry of National Defence issued a statement warning of a possible military offensive by Thai forces along the border, following reports that the Thai military had instructed the remaining civilians in Surin province's border area to evacuate by nightfall. The Royal Thai Army later denied that it was planning an imminent strike on Cambodia, stating that it would continue to honor the ceasefire while remaining vigilant.

Later that night, a drone crashed in Surin province. Initial reports suggested that Cambodia had flown drones into Thai territory, causing panic among local residents. The RTA subsequently clarified that the drone was actually a Thai CW-15 model. On 4 August 2025, unverified Thai sources reported that the bodies of Cambodian soldiers along the border had not been properly recovered, raising concerns about potential health hazards and foul odors. Thai authorities condemned Cambodia, alleging that it "ignored and disrespected their deceased soldiers." At the same time, Cambodia's Ministry of National Defence stated that at 11 am, Thai soldiers, accompanied by heavy machinery, had entered the An Ses area, located within Cambodian territory, and erected barbed wire despite strong objections from the Cambodian military. The ministry demanded that the Royal Thai Army immediately cease its actions and fully respect Cambodian sovereignty and territorial integrity.

On 5 August 2025, the Royal Thai Army (RTA) invited representatives from the International Committee of the Red Cross (ICRC) to visit the 18 Cambodian prisoners of war (POWs) held in Thai custody, in accordance with standard ICRC procedures. The RTA stated that the visit "reflects Thailand's respect for and commitment to strict adherence to international humanitarian principles" and emphasizes "transparency in operations and the care of prisoners of war with human dignity." The RTA added that the Cambodian POWs were being held in good condition, received appropriate care, and that ICRC representatives were allowed to meet and speak freely with the POWs without restrictions.

=== 6–27 August ===
On 6 August 2025, Acting Prime Minister Phumtham stated to Thai media that he intended to pursue legal action to seek war reparations from Cambodia, though not through the International Criminal Court (ICC). In response, Cambodia expressed that the announcement was "acknowledged with disappointment" and reaffirmed its position that Thailand was responsible for the escalation of hostilities, asserting that Cambodian actions had been in self-defense. On 9 August 2025, at approximately 10:00 am, three Thai soldiers were injured when a landmine detonated during a patrol in the contested border zone while installing barbed wire in Kantharalak District, Sisaket Province.

On 10 August 2025, during a press conference at Fort Suranari, Boonsin stated that Cambodian casualties in the conflict were approximately 3,000. He also claimed that Cambodia was using drones to "deliberately find coordinates of hospitals and they have weapons that can reach them." Boonsin added that Thai forces were stationed 30 meters from Prasat Ta Khwai and asserted, "The temple is ours, and we must take it back." On the same day, a Royal Thai Navy (RTN) soldier, Acting Sub-Lieutenant Phattharawut Rattanawong, died after a weapon misfired during routine checks while he was deployed in the border area of Surin Province.

On 11 August 2025, Cambodia's Ministry of National Defence condemned remarks made by Boonsin regarding his plan to seize Prasat Ta Khwai and the closure of Prasat Ta Muen Thom, which lie within disputed territory. The ministry described the statements as a clear violation of the ceasefire agreement and evidence of a deliberate attempt to instigate conflict and premeditated military action against Cambodia. The ministry's spokesperson called on the international community involved in monitoring the ceasefire to urge Thailand to respect the agreement, emphasizing that border disputes should be resolved through technical mechanisms and international law rather than armed force. On 12 August 2025, Thai sources reported that civilians who had been evacuated from border areas on the Thai side began returning to their homes following a period with no reported fighting. Authorities also urged residents to report any unexploded ordnance for proper disposal. On the same day, a Thai soldier patrolling the Ta Muen Thom area was injured by a landmine.

On 13 August 2025, Cambodia's Ministry of National Defence confirmed that Thai paramilitary forces and border police had erected barbed wire and placed tires in Banteay Meanchey Province, actions which were viewed as violations of the ceasefire agreement. On 19 August 2025, the Royal Thai Army (RTA) recovered a mobile phone at Phu Makhuea, allegedly belonging to a Cambodian soldier, which reportedly contained images of Cambodian soldiers planting PMN-2 landmines.

In response to Cambodian allegations that Thailand had used chemical weapons, particularly a claim by the Cambodian Mine Action Centre's director-general Heng Ratan that a shell containing white phosphorus had been discovered, the RTA acknowledged the use of white phosphorus munitions. The army stated that these claims were distorted and misleading, emphasizing that white phosphorus is not classified as a chemical weapon under the Chemical Weapons Convention and that its use strictly follows regulations, targeting only military positions.

On 20 August 2025, Phumtham rejected a proposal from Malaysian Prime Minister Anwar Ibrahim to deploy additional international observers to monitor the ceasefire, stating that border disputes are a matter to be resolved strictly between Thailand and Cambodia. On 21 August 2025, Cambodia's Ministry of National Defence reaffirmed the country's commitment to preventing the dissemination, sharing, or production of false information, in accordance with the 13-point agreement reached at the GBC meeting. The ministry also called on Thailand to fully implement all ceasefire agreements, including the release of the 18 Cambodian soldiers captured eight hours after the ceasefire took effect.

On 23 August 2025, a Royal Thai Army soldier, Private Pittayut Soda, died under unknown circumstances while deployed near Prasat Ta Muen Thom along the border region. On 25 August 2025, an attempt by the RTA to install razor wire in Chok Chey village, Banteay Meanchey Province, Cambodia, was reportedly blocked by local residents and authorities. The RTA stated that the incident resulted from a misunderstanding by Cambodian authorities, asserting that the barbed wire was deployed temporarily as a safety measure and was subsequently redeployed. During the incident, the RTA also deployed a long-range acoustic device (LRAD) crowd-control device.

On 27 August 2025, three Thai soldiers were injured by a landmine during a patrol near Prasat Ta Khwai, with one soldier, Private Adisorn Pomklang, losing his right foot. The injured personnel were subsequently transported to Phanom Dong Rak Hospital for treatment. This incident marked the sixth occasion during the border dispute in which a landmine caused injuries to Thai soldiers. On the same day, during a briefing with UN secretary-general António Guterres, Cambodia stated that it had not deployed any new landmines. Cambodian representatives emphasized their commitment to the ceasefire agreement and pledged utmost restraint in response to perceived provocations by the Royal Thai Army (RTA), including the installation of barbed wire cutting off Cambodian villages, forced evictions of civilians from long-inhabited homes, and destruction of property.

=== 29 August – 7 September ===
On 29 August 2025, the Royal Thai Army (RTA) declared martial law in Ban Nong Chan, Sa Kaeo province, following several incidents involving Thai and Cambodian civilian protesters. The RTA also imposed restrictions on weapons possession, filming of military activities, and the unauthorized use of loudspeakers. On the same day, the Constitutional Court of Thailand formally removed Paetongtarn from office as prime minister, finding that she had violated ethical standards in a phone call with Hun Sen. On 2 September 2025, Cambodia's Ministry of Defence spokesperson Maly Socheata confirmed that Major General Srey Duk was alive, following widespread rumors of his death.

On 4 September 2025, another attempt by the Royal Thai Army (RTA) to evict Cambodian residents in Banteay Meanchey Province from long-inhabited homes sparked a confrontation between Thai troops and local villagers. Cambodian military personnel were present to protect the villagers, while the provincial governor urged Thai authorities to refrain from escalating tensions and to resolve border disputes through the GBC and JBC mechanisms, as stipulated in the 2000 Memorandum of Understanding and subsequent ceasefire agreements. Officials also expressed concern over the RTA's attempts to expand conflict zones and unilaterally alter the border.

On 7 September 2025, Manet sent a congratulatory letter to Anutin Charnvirakul following his election as Prime Minister of Thailand. In the letter, Manet expressed his anticipation of working with Anutin to restore relations between Thailand and Cambodia to normalcy and wished him success in office.

=== 17–27 September ===
On 17 September 2025, the Royal Thai Army (RTA) reported that approximately 200 Cambodian civilian protesters approached Thai-installed barbed wire along the border between Ban Nong Ya Kaew in Sa Kaeo Province, Thailand, and Ou Beichoan commune, Ou Chrov District, Banteay Meanchey Province, Cambodia, and began removing it. The RTA claimed that some protesters were armed with wooden sticks and slingshots. After negotiations, the RTA stated that it deployed riot police and other crowd-control measures, including tear gas and rubber bullets, to prevent the situation from escalating. Some Thai soldiers reportedly sustained injuries from projectiles. The RTA accused Cambodian soldiers present in the area of failing to control the protesters.

In response, the Cambodian government condemned the alleged cross-border incursion by Thai forces into Prey Chan Village, Ou Beichoan commune. Cambodian officials stated that Thai forces, including border patrol and paratroopers, entered Cambodian territory with batons, shields, vehicles, tear gas, and other equipment, allegedly to suppress demonstrations and seize farmland. Cambodian authorities reported that at least 24–30 civilians, including Buddhist monks, were injured. Cambodian security forces did not retaliate, and emergency services treated the wounded. The Malaysian-led Interim Observer Team visited the site to observe and verify the border situation.

The Cambodian government described the actions of Thai forces as violations of the ceasefire, Cambodian sovereignty, and international law, emphasizing that local residents had protested peacefully to defend farmland. Cambodia reaffirmed its commitment under Prime Minister Hun Manet to resolve disputes peacefully and urged Thailand to respect ceasefire agreements and avoid actions that could escalate tensions. The RTA responded by asserting that the area was within Thai territory and that its use of crowd-control measures was lawful. Thai authorities claimed that Cambodian actions violated the ceasefire by "inciting its people to enter Thai territory."

On 27 September 2025, gunfire was reported in the Chong Ahn Ma area along the Cambodia–Thailand border. Thai sources claimed that Cambodian forces fired on Thai positions. Conversely, Cambodia's Ministry of National Defence alleged that Thai troops fired mortars and rifles across the border at Cambodian positions in the An Ses area at approximately 11:52 am. The ministry condemned the attack as a violation of the ceasefire agreement and urged Thailand to respect its commitments, while reaffirming Cambodia's pledge to resolve disputes peacefully. The clashes reportedly lasted around 30 minutes, with no Thai casualties reported.

=== 10–14 October ===
On 10 October 2025, reports emerged of Thai military movements near Prey Chan village, prompting the Cambodian government to condemn the alleged violation of the ceasefire agreement, as well as provisions from the GBC and RBC meetings, the 2000 MOU, and international human rights and humanitarian law. Later that night, from approximately 22:44 until 03:53 on 11 October, Thai forces reportedly used extremely loud speakers emitting unsettling sounds, including ghost-like howls and aircraft noises, directed at residents of Prey Chan and Chouk Chey villages.

On the same day, Thailand initiated mine-clearance operations at Ban Nong Chan and Ban Nong Ya Kaew, in accordance with the agreement made between Cambodia and Thailand during the GBC meeting on 10 September. Thai authorities stated that 135 Cambodian households were illegally situated on Thai territory and were ordered to evacuate by 10 October. Approximately 100 Cambodian protesters gathered to oppose Thailand's claimed landmine clearance and villagers eviction operations.

Between 10 and 14 October, the RTA uncovered nine landmines of various types, including PMN-2, POMZ-2, and MN-79 mines. Explosive Ordnance Disposal (EOD) units successfully neutralized all discovered mines.

== Diplomatic and mediation efforts ==
On 2 June 2025, Manet announced that the Cambodian government would file a complaint to the International Court of Justice (ICJ), expressing hope that Thailand would agree to submit the border dispute to the ICJ to prevent any armed confrontations. Thailand, however, proposed seeking de-escalation through bilateral negotiations, as the country does not recognize the jurisdiction of the ICJ.

Following the outbreak of armed conflict in late July, on 24 July, Manet announced he had sent a letter to Asim Iftikhar Ahmad and Ishaq Dar of Pakistan, the then-President of the United Nations Security Council, requesting an urgent meeting to halt "Thailand's aggression against Cambodia's sovereignty."

On 25 July, the Thai Ministry of Foreign Affairs sent a letter to the United Nations Security Council (UNSC), presenting evidence that Cambodia had violated Thai sovereignty and requesting the UNSC President to circulate the letter to member states. Thailand condemned Cambodia's actions as repeated violations of international law, citing incidents after Thai soldiers stepped on landmines on 16 and 23 July, and called for Cambodia to immediately cease attacks on both military and civilian targets in accordance with the Geneva Conventions.

Later on 25 July, Thailand declined mediation offers from the United States, China, and Malaysia, preferring to resolve the dispute bilaterally. On the same day, Manet stated that Cambodia and Thailand had initially agreed to a ceasefire proposed by Malaysian Prime Minister Anwar Ibrahim, but Thailand retracted the agreement an hour before it was to take effect at midnight on 24 July. Cambodia's ambassador to the United Nations, Chhea Keo, also called for an immediate and unconditional ceasefire.

There were reports of clashes at the Laos border as well; however, Laotian government denied being involved in the conflict. On 26 July, President Trump held a phone call with Phumtham and Manet to mediate the conflict, stating that both sides had agreed to a ceasefire. On 27 July, Phumtham expressed appreciation for the support from Trump and insisted on preferring bilateral dialogue with Cambodia without third-party intervention. U.S. secretary of state Marco Rubio confirmed that U.S. delegates were sent to Malaysia to observe peace negotiations.

On 27 July, Malaysian Foreign Affairs Minister Mohamad Hasan confirmed that both Cambodian and Thai leaders would meet in Malaysia the next day for ceasefire negotiations mediated by Prime Minister Anwar.

On 28 July, Thailand and Cambodia agreed to an unconditional ceasefire, scheduled to take effect at midnight. Talks in Putrajaya involved Phumtham, Foreign Affairs Minister Maris Sangiampongsa, and General Natthaphon Narkphanit meeting with Manet at 3 p.m. (UTC+8), with U.S. and Chinese envoys attending. Co-facilitators included U.S. ambassador to Malaysia Edgard Kagan and Chinese ambassador Ouyang Yujing.

Following ceasefire accusations at the United Nations General Assembly in New York City, China hosted an informal meeting in Shanghai with Cambodian official Kung Phaok and Thai executive advisor Jullapong Nonsrichai, in which both sides reaffirmed their commitment to the ceasefire.

The two countries agreed to continue discussions on border issues in Kuala Lumpur, Malaysia, in August.

On 7 August, Manet announced Cambodia would officially nominate Trump for the 2025 Nobel Peace Prize for his role in restoring peace and stability along the border. That same day, a General Border Committee meeting in Kuala Lumpur resulted in a 13-point agreement, including cessation of hostilities, avoidance of military provocation, protection of civilians, and maintenance of bilateral communication.

During the General Border Committee meeting on 10 September, Thailand and Cambodia agreed to five additional measures to improve relations:

1. Removal of heavy weapons from the border area within three weeks.
2. Formation of a joint committee to assist in de-mining operations.
3. Curbing online scamming operations along the border.
4. Management of the Ban Nong Chan area to restore normalcy within September.
5. Resumption of cross-border trade in selected sections of the border.

== Second ceasefire and peace deal ==
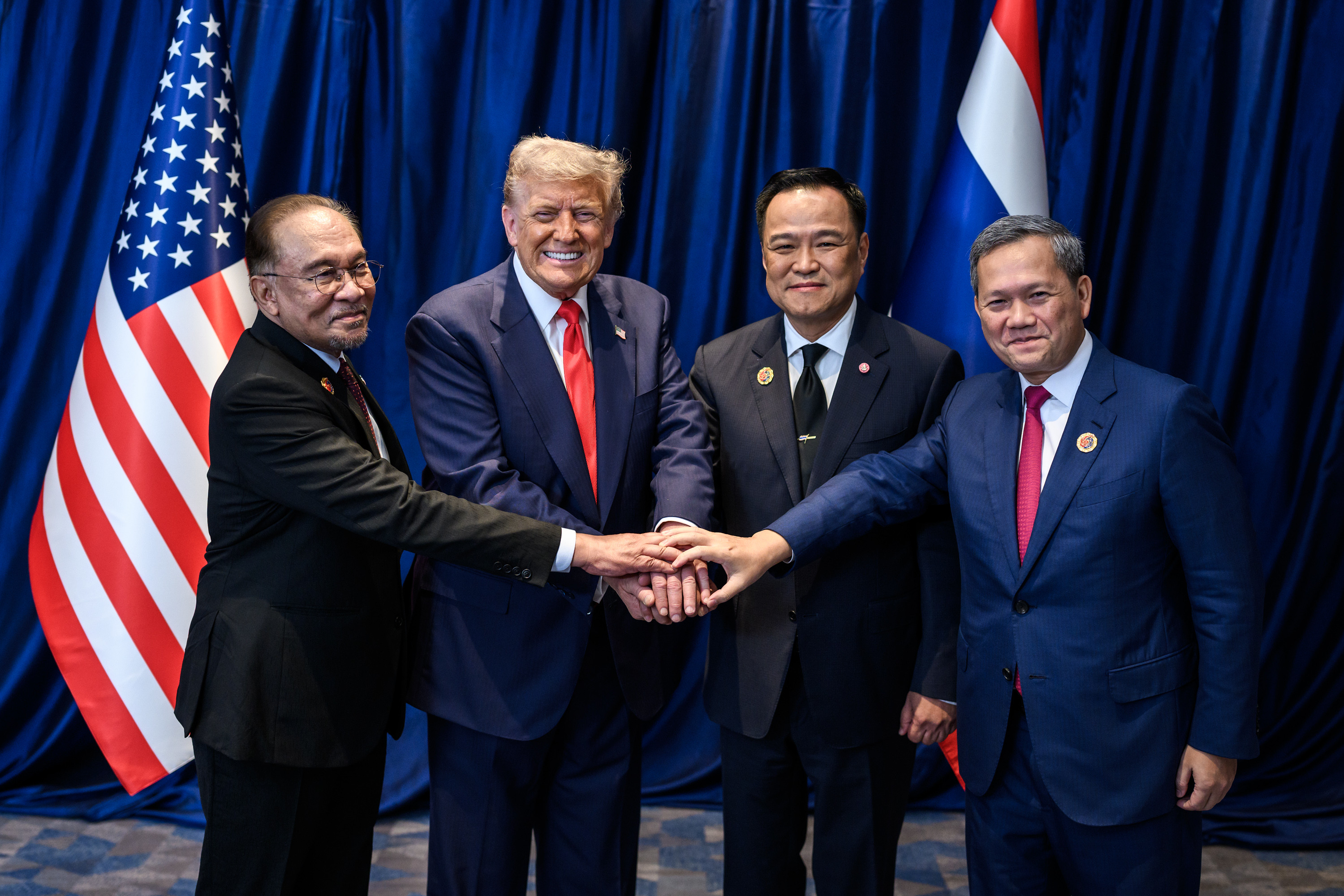
From left to right: Anwar Ibrahim, Donald Trump, Anutin Charnvirakul and Hun Manet after the signing of the Kuala Lumpur Peace Accord, 26 October 2025.

A comprehensive ceasefire agreement, known as the Kuala Lumpur Peace Accord, was signed on 26 October 2025 at the Kuala Lumpur Convention Centre in Kuala Lumpur, the capital city of Malaysia, during the 47th ASEAN Summit. The accord was co-signed by Thai prime minister Anutin Charnvirakul and Cambodian prime minister Hun Manet, while the signing ceremony was witnessed by Malaysian prime minister Anwar Ibrahim and U.S. president Donald Trump.

The agreement outlined a series of measures aimed at de-escalating the border conflict and restoring stability in the affected regions. Key provisions included:

1. The withdrawal of heavy artillery and armored vehicles from contested border areas.
2. The establishment of an interim ceasefire monitoring team composed of ASEAN observers and representatives from both nations.
3. Bilateral cooperation on landmine clearance and removal of unexploded ordnance from former combat zones.
4. Replacement of missing or disputed border markers with temporary markers until a permanent demarcation could be negotiated.
5. The release of 18 Cambodian prisoners of war detained by Thailand during the conflict.
6. Formation of a joint task force to address the cross-border proliferation of scam centres and transnational criminal activities.

Thai Foreign Affairs Minister Sihasak Phuangketkeow described the accords as a "pathway to peace", while President Trump officially labeled the agreement the Kuala Lumpur Peace Accord, emphasizing the role of international mediation in resolving long-standing territorial disputes. On 27 October, Anutin insisted reopening border crossings was conditional on Cambodia implementing and committing to demilitarizing the border and cracking down on the scam centers, saying "all actions must begin with Cambodia".

== Renewed conflict ==
=== Suspension of peace deal ===
On 10 November 2025, a landmine, reported to be Cambodian, exploded in the border in Sisaket province, injuring two Thai soldiers, with one, Sergeant Major First Class Therdsak Samaphong, losing his right foot and the other, Private Vachira Panthana, experiencing chest pain. After this incident, Thailand announced it was suspending the implementation of a peace agreement with Cambodia.

Following the incident, the Cambodian Ministry of National Defence expressed regret, claimed that the explosion was caused by old landmines remaining from past conflicts. Ministry spokesperson Maly Socheata rejected Thai allegations that Cambodia had laid new mines, affirming compliance with the Ottawa Treaty. The ministry urged Thai troops to avoid patrolling in known mine-contaminated zones to prevent further accidents and affirmed Cambodia's commitment to peace and bilateral cooperation.

On 12 November 2025 at around 4:00 pm, the Royal Thai Army reported hearing gunfire from the Cambodian side of the border for about ten minutes near Nong Ya Kaeo, Sisaket province. Local Cambodian authorities and Cambodia's Defence Ministry accused the RTA of injuring five Cambodian civilians in Prey Chan Village, Ou Beichoan Commune, Ou Chrov District, Banteay Meanchey province, leaving one civilian dead and several others injured. The incident occurred two days after Thailand suspended the peace agreement following the Sisaket landmine explosion. Cambodian authorities stated that an investigation was under way and called for calm while urging both sides to avoid further escalation. In early December 2025, the RTAF signed a $108m deal to acquire the Barak MX air defense system from Israel Aerospace Industries.

=== December clashes ===
On 7 December 2025 at around 2:15 pm, Cambodia's Ministry of Defense claimed that Thai troops had opened fire with small arms, B-40 grenade launchers, and 60 mm mortars at a Cambodian position in Prolean Thmor area of Choam Khsant District, Preah Vihear Province. Cambodia claimed that its troops immediately contacted their Thai counterparts to halt the attack, did not return fire, and that the shooting ceased by 2:32 pm. Cambodian forces said they continued monitoring the situation while maintaining restraint. The ministry notified the ASEAN Observer Team and requested an investigation, reaffirming Cambodia's commitment to the ceasefire and peaceful resolution of border issues.

On Thailand's side, Thailand's Ministry of Defense stated that Cambodian forces opened fire at around 2:15 p.m. at an area around Phu Pha Lek-Phlan Hin Paet Kon of Sisaket Province while Thai soldiers and engineers were carrying out a mission to improve the route from Phu Pha Lek to Phieng Fa Checkpoint. Two Thai soldiers were injured, Sergeant Anuchart Rueankham was shot in the leg and another, Private Pornchai Champajumshot was struck in the chest area of his body armor. Thailand stated that Cambodian forces also fired a recoilless gun into Thai territory, prompting Thai forces to return fire in accordance with the rules of engagement and international principles of proportionality. The clash later ended at 2:50 pm, The Ministry of Defence condemns the actions of the Cambodian side for claiming that the Thai military had fired first and that Cambodian forces did not return fire despite clear evidence that Thai soldiers were injured by Cambodian military weapons and intended to escalate tensions.

Following a 35-minute clash in Sisaket Province that injured two Thai soldiers, the Second Army Region of the Thai military announced border evacuations in Buriram, Surin, Sisaket, and Ubon Ratchathani and encouraged residents to hide in shelters, citing 'current uncertainty and the possibility that the clashes may escalate'.

=== 8–9 December ===
On the morning of 8 December, fighting erupted across the border. The 2nd Army Area of the Thai military announced that the RTAF had launched an air strike campaign along the border with Cambodia in retaliation to clashes that killed one Thai soldier in Ubon Ratchathani province. The RTA also reported that the RCA launched BM-21 rockets against Thai civilians.

At around 5:04 am, Thai forces reportedly opened fire on Cambodian positions in Preah Vihear province, including the An Ses area, Tamoan Thom temple, and the 5 Makara zone. Cambodian authorities stated that their troops did not return fire and had not deployed heavy weapons, rejecting Thai claims that Cambodia provoked the attacks. Thailand also deployed F-16 fighter jets targeting Cambodian artillery positions. The clashes prompted evacuations in Preah Vihear and Oddar Meanchey provinces, injured several civilians, damaged several houses, and led to temporary school and hospital closures on both sides of the border to protect civilians.

At 2:30 pm. Thailand set an ultimatum for a ceasefire at 6 p.m. or Thailand will use its full military strength. Thailand said it will continue using military action against Cambodia. The Civil Aviation Authority of Thailand (CAAT) banned drone flights in several border provinces from 9 December.

Cambodia denied the accusations from Thailand that clashes resulted in the death of a Thai soldier. Cambodian information minister Neth Pheaktra later informed Agence France-Presse that Thai attacks killed at least four Cambodian civilians in Oddar Meanchey and Preah Vihear and that 10 others were also wounded.

Fighting intensified on 9 December after the ultimatum. RTA Chief of Staff, General Chaiyapruek Duangprapat, stated that the RTA's current objective is to "incapacitate the Cambodian army to prevent future threats or incursions." That same day, the RTN stated that "up to 80%" of Cambodian positions including weapon and supply storage were destroyed by the Royal Thai Marine Corps (RTMC) during the operation around the "Three House" casino complex near the border of Trat province, while the RTMC suffered no casualty.

According to the Cambodia's Ministry of National Defence spokeswoman Maly Socheata alleged that shelling by Thai forces between 8–9 December killed seven Cambodian civilians and injured 20 others. The ministry condemned the attacks as "inhuman and brutal", calling them a violation of the ceasefire and the Cambodia–Thailand Joint Declaration signed on 26 October 2025. Furthermore, reports indicated that Thailand deployed tanks and conducted airstrikes during the assault. Later that night, the RTA stated that the RCA's PHL-03 long-range multiple rocket launcher was spotted in Kampong Thom province.

Cambodia's Ministry of Culture and Fine Arts condemned Thai military attacks on Prasat Ta Khwai, describing them as "profoundly immoral" and a violation of cultural heritage. The ministry called on UNESCO and ASEAN to intervene and noted that nearby the Preah Vihear temple was also damaged, including facilities under a Cambodia–India conservation project. Cambodia pledged to hold those responsible accountable under international law.

=== 10–11 December ===
On 10 December, one day after the opening ceremony of the 2025 SEA Games hosted in Thailand, Cambodia announced the complete withdrawal of its delegation from the Games, citing escalating border clashes and safety fears expressed by athletes' families. Around 30 Cambodian athletes and officials had already taken part in the opening ceremony on 9 December, but the delegation exited the competition before any events began.

At 4:30 pm, the RTA officially codenamed the military operation as Operation Sattawat (Thai: ยุทธการศตวรรษ) to honour the fallen Thai soldiers and Sergeant Major Sattawat Sujarit, the first fallen soldier in the second clashes. The RTA also announced the destruction of a tower crane near the Preah Vihear complex which were allegedly used by the RCA for observation purposes. At 5.00 pm, the RTA's Burapha command declared martial law and curfew from 9 p.m. to 5 a.m. in four districts of Sa Kaeo province.

On the morning of 11 December, the RTAF's F-16 fighters bombed a casino in Banteay Ampil district of Oddar Meanchey province, in addition to destroying the nearby oil depot via the RTA's artillery strikes. That same day, Cambodia accused Thai forces of shelling the Khnar Temple area as well as civilians in Banteay Meachay province.

=== 12–13 December ===
On 12 December, the RTA's 2nd Army Division released a statement that Cambodia employed FPV suicide drones of similar design to the one used by Ukraine in the Russo-Ukrainian war, which were allegedly controlled by foreign mercenaries. On 10:00 pm, Thailand's prime minister Anutin Charnvirakul confirmed that he has made a phone call with his Malaysian counterpart Anwar Ibrahim and the US president Donald Trump about potential ceasefire. According to Anutin, Trump "urged for a ceasefire", although he is "understanding" of Thailand's circumstance. In the press conference, Anutin reaffirmed the Thai government's position that the military operation is not an invasion, but a "defense of Thai sovereignty and people" and that Cambodia "must abide by the ceasefire, must withdraw their forces, and must disarm the minefields with observable results."

On 13 December, Cambodia's prime minister Hun Manet announced that he had phone conversation with both Anwar Ibrahim and Donald Trump to find ways for a ceasefire. During the phone call, he thanked their efforts for peaceful resolution and reaffirmed Cambodia's commitment to the Kualar Lumpur Joint Declaration. He also remarked his suggestion to use satellite verification regarding the shooting on 7 December.

The same day, Cambodia accused Thailand of continuing airstrikes hours after U.S. President Donald Trump announced that Bangkok and Phnom Penh had agreed to a ceasefire. Cambodia's Ministry of National Defense stated that two Thai F-16 fighter jets dropped seven bombs on multiple targets, including hotel buildings and bridges in the Thmor Da area of Pursat province. The ministry also reported that Thai naval forces fired artillery shells into Koh Kong province in the early hours of the morning, striking coastal areas and civilian infrastructure. The clashes, which intensified earlier, forced residents in Koh Kong province to flee their homes, according to Cambodian authorities, as hostilities spread into coastal areas.

At 6.10 am, the RTAF released images confirming the destruction of the Chay Chum Nia bridge and a casino in Pursat province via bombing campaign. Both locations are considered vital for the RCA's military supply and therefore designated "military targets" by the RTAF. Later, the RTN confirmed shelling against Cambodian positions on the Koh Yor island in Koh Kong province, stating that it destroyed two 130 mm battery emplacements. Several BM-21 strikes were reported in Sisaket and Sa Kaeo provinces, the former struck a civilian house resulting in numerous injuries.

At the press conference on 6:20 pm, Anutin denied Anwar Ibrahim's Facebook post that both Cambodia and Thailand will observe a ceasefire on 10:00 p.m. that day, stating that he has not made any ceasefire agreement during any of the phone calls with Ibrahim. Anutin cited the continued rocket attacks on border provinces as one of the reason for Thailand's refusal. At 10:00 pm, fighting reportedly ceased around the border of the Surin province, although sporadic clashes were reported at Chong Ahn Ma, which the RTA captured earlier that day.

=== 14–16 December ===
Fighting resumed on the morning of 14 December. Around 4:15 am, Thai provincial officials reported that Cambodian forces fired BM-21 rockets into Kantharalak, Sisaket Province, with at least one rocket striking a residential house, killing a civilian. At 7:20 am, the RTMC captured the "Three House" casino complex on the border of Trat province. The area was alleged by the RTA to have encroached the Thai border for at least 40 years and is considered of military importance due to its usage as a base by the RCA.

On 15 December, Cambodia claimed that the RTAF's F-16 fighter jets had struck near evacuee camps in Srei Snam district, Siem Reap province, more than 70 kilometers from the border causing more evacuations from the conflict area. At 12:00 am, the RTAF officially stated that the bombing targeted Cambodian weapon depots in the Banteay Meanchey. The RTA also announced that they have captured Prasat Ta Khwai and Hill 500 at Emerald Triangle, the latter resulted into the RTA captured a large number of Chinese-made anti-tank missiles, including the GAM-102 fire-and-forget ATGM. At 5:00 p.m. the Russian Embassy of Thailand released a statement denying the allegations of Russian mercenaries employed by Cambodia.

On 16 December, Thai foreign minister Sihasak Phuangketkeow stated during the interview that the United Nations Security Council has not yet considered holding a special meeting regarding the conflict. Regarding the capture of Chinese-made weapons on Hill 500, Sihasak stated that the Chinese ambassador has clarified that the weapons delivered to Cambodia were old ones, and that they have not delivering any new arms, however "there may be various ways these weapons were obtained."

=== 17–19 December ===
On 17 December, two Thai soldiers, Private Wasan Khanhuathon and Sergeant Major Pornsak Iamsa-ad, were killed during an armed engagement between both forces in Sisaket and Sa Kaeo province. The Thai army clashed with the Cambodian army at "Hill 350" On 19 December, spokesperson for the Thai Defence Ministry Admiral Surasant Kongsiri denied Cambodia's claims regarding a downed RTAF F-16 fighter jet, and claims made on social media stating that "Thailand's military operations aimed to seize and annex Cambodian territory."

=== 20–25 December ===
After five days of continuous military operations, Thailand captured Hill 350 from Cambodia and recovered the bodies of two soldiers: Sergeant Major Samroeng Khlangprakhon and Private Phanupat Saorsa. On 22 December, footage emerged allegedly showing Thai soldiers toppling a statue of Vishnu situated 400 meters from the border line in An Ses area, Preah Vihear province received condemnation from Cambodian and Indian communities calling it 'disrespectful act' which hurt the sentiments of followers around the world.

On 25 December at 9:00 am, Cambodian and Thai representative held a conference meeting at Pong Nam Rhon, Chanthaburi province to discuss the potential ceasefire. That same day, the RTA released a statement regarding the video of a military-operated excavator knocking down a statue of the Hindu deity Vishnu near the border area. The RTA stated that the act was "neither motivated by religious issue nor intended to be sarciligious" but as a part of an "administrative measure" to remove unauthorized religious buildings in the area.

=== Third ceasefire ===
On the morning of 27 December, Thailand and Cambodia signed a new ceasefire agreement, which took effect at 12:00 p.m. local time. Prior to the ceasefire, Cambodia's defence ministry stated that the RTAF launched airstrikes on Serei Saophoan, Banteay Meachay, while the RTA stated that three soldiers were injured in clashes 30 minutes before the ceasefire. On 29 December, the RTA accused Cambodia of breaking the ceasefire by deploying more than 250 drones from their side of the border the previous evening. On 31 December, Thailand released 18 Cambodian POWs that it had held since July.

Cambodian district and provincial officials told local media that following the ceasefire, Thai forces continued to erect razor wire and place shipping containers near four villages in Kork Romiet commune, which they said were located inside Cambodian territory. The officials claimed that a total of 292 hectares were affected, including residential and agricultural land, and that more than 1,300 houses were impacted, leaving many residents displaced.

On 6 January 2026, the Thai army gave a statement accusing Cambodian forces of firing mortar rounds into Thailand's Ubon Ratchathani province. One soldier was wounded by shrapnel. The Thai army said in a later statement that the Cambodian side had contacted a Thai military unit and claimed "there was no intention to fire into Thai territory," adding, "the incident was caused by an operational error by Cambodian personnel." The Thai military said it warned Cambodian forces to exercise caution, stressing if a similar incident occurred, Thailand may need to retaliate.

Thailand has accused Cambodian soldiers of deliberately setting fires along the frontline forest areas to obscure visibility and move troops and equipment amid tensions along the Thai-Cambodian border. Alleged that Cambodian troops were cooperating with local villagers to ignite forest fires, describing the actions not as agricultural clearing but as a "tactical information filtering strategy." the smoke was intended to reduce visibility and create cover for the movement of weapons and personnel.

On 8 September, Thai troops reported that it had captured people who presented themselves as civilians but were Cambodian soldiers around the O Smach near the border of Thailand. Such incidents had occurred on two or three occasions.

== Humanitarian impact and casualties ==
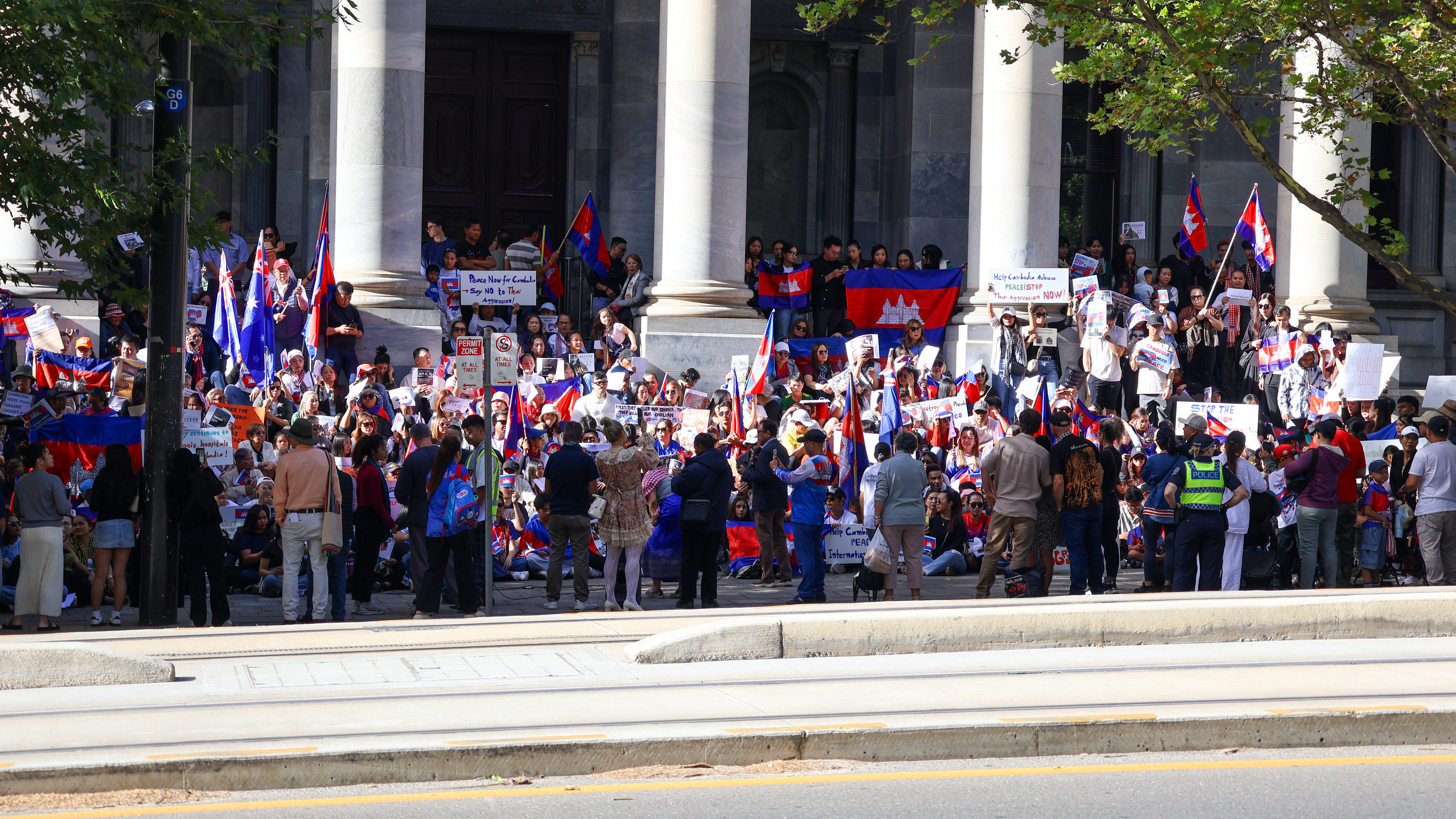
Protest in support of Cambodia at the Parliament of South Australia, 14 December 2025.

By late July, approximately 138,000 civilians in Thailand had been evacuated from areas near the border, while a total of over 200,000 people were displaced across both countries. Reports indicated that thousands of residents were fleeing from other towns near the frontier as civilian infrastructure, including hospitals and gas stations, came under attack.

On 26 July, Cambodia announced the death of Major General Duong Samneang, commander of the 7th Infantry Division, who was killed by an artillery strike in the Chong Ta Thao–Phu Makhuea area.

During the five-day clashes in July, 48 people were confirmed killed, including: sixteen Thai and five Cambodian soldiers, seventeen Thai and eight Cambodian civilians, and two unknown persons. According to an independent analysis by Nikkei Asia, the actual combatant death toll on the Cambodian side was at least 50.

According to Thai authorities, about 20 hospitals in border provinces sustained significant damages estimated at 285 million baht (US$8.78 million). The most severely affected was Phanom Dong Rak Hospital in Surin province, where full restoration was expected to take "years."

In addition to infrastructure destruction, the Cambodian Ministry of Labour and Vocational Training issued a statement warning of increasing violence and harassment toward Cambodian migrant workers in Thailand, calling upon international brands and consumers to ensure their protection.

Following the ceasefire in early August, Thai media reported a massive traffic congestion spanning 8 kilometres at the Ban Laem border checkpoint, where about 20,000 Cambodian nationals were attempting to return home.

On 17 November, Cambodian authorities confirmed that they were investigating a complaint filed by an 18-year-old migrant worker who alleged that she had been raped by individuals described as Thai Thahan Phran soldiers while crossing the border into Cambodia. According to Cambodian police, the victim was hospitalised and underwent forensic examination, and an official investigation was initiated. The next day, 216 Organisations in Cambodia condemned the action of the perpetrators calling it 'a grave violation of human rights, women's rights, and the national rights of migrant workers' in response. The Royal Thai Army denied the claims, and as of March 2026 the case has not received extensive media coverage or independent verification. This incident happened after months of Cambodian migrant workers fleeing Thailand amid rising discrimination and violence, which includes at least four Cambodian workers being assaulted and social media posts calling Thais to show patriotism by attacking Cambodians.

Since 10 October, Cambodia has closed the Poipet border crossing and preventing thousands of Thai citizens from leaving the country. On 12 December, the RTA released a statement accusing Cambodian authorities of detaining Thai citizens, an action that may constitute a war crime. During that time, around 100 Thai citizens in Cambodia chose to return to their homeland via illegal border crossings. Later on 15 December, Cambodian Senate president Hun Sen posted a statement addressing the Thai accusation of detaining their citizens at Poipet crossing, stating that Cambodia did not intend to detain the Thai citizens, but "closed the land borders for the safety of both Cambodian and Thai citizens", and urged not to interpret the border closure as a provocation.

By late December, independent estimates suggested that at least 150 people had been killed and more than half a million had been displaced during the renewed hostilities. Thailand reported that 26 soldiers and one civilian had been killed during the month's fighting, while Cambodia reported that at least 30 civilians had been killed and 90 injured. Cambodia did not release military casualty figures, but media estimates put that toll at roughly 130 killed.

During 2025, Uppsala Conflict Data Program recorded 252 fatalities in the conflict between Thailand and Cambodia, with Cambodian soldiers making up more than half. Civilians were also killed, with 51 recorded fatalities in total. The highest estimate for all the conflict’s fatalities during 2025, however, was much higher at 442 fatalities.

The conflict also spread into South Korea, in which 2 Thai people in South Korea were assaulted by Cambodians.

Footage of Thai soldiers destroying civilian homes and looting personal properties such as vehicles, motorbikes, bicycles, household items, and pet emerged, leading to opposition and condemnation by the spokesperson of the Cambodian royal government, which later the Thai minister of defense ordered the Thai military to return personal property not related to military equipment to Cambodia under Rule 50 of the ICRC's International Humanitarian Law (IHL), which attempts to preserve property during wartime.

== International reactions ==
=== Countries ===
==== Belligerents ====
- Cambodia: The Ministry of National Defence condemned the clashes, describing them as a "brutal and illegal military aggression" by Thailand. Senate president Hun Sen warned Thailand against any invasion, asserting that Cambodia was "ready for combat" and would strike back if attacked.
- Thailand: During the initial clashes, then-suspended Prime Minister Paetongtarn Shinawatra condemned Cambodia for attacking Thai positions and civilian areas, vowing that Thailand would retaliate if its sovereignty continued to be violated.

==== ASEAN member states ====
- Brunei: The Ministry of Foreign Affairs stated that Brunei was closely following developments at the border, urging both sides to exercise caution and engage in communication and consultations to de-escalate the crisis.
- Indonesia: The Ministry of Foreign Affairs expressed confidence that Thailand and Cambodia would return to peaceful means to resolve their differences. It urged both sides to settle their concerns amicably in accordance with the Treaty of Amity and Cooperation and the ASEAN Charter. The Government of Indonesia added that it would not interfere in the conflict and prioritized the safety of Indonesian citizens in affected areas.
- Laos: The Ministry of Foreign Affairs expressed deep concern about the situation along the Cambodia–Thailand border and called on both sides to exercise restraint and seek a peaceful solution to the ongoing tensions.
- Malaysia: Prime Minister Anwar Ibrahim voiced concern over the border clashes and expressed his readiness to engage with both parties to help facilitate de-escalation and peace talks. He described the situation as "worrying" and stated, "I have sent messages to both prime ministers and look forward to speaking with them later today or tonight." He added, "The least we can expect is for them to stand down and hopefully try to enter into negotiation."
- Myanmar: Military spokesperson and Deputy Minister of Information Zaw Min Tun stated that Myanmar believed Thailand and Cambodia could reach a peaceful resolution to the crisis. The Myanmar Embassy in Thailand echoed this sentiment and advised Myanmar nationals to evacuate the conflict zone.
- Philippines: The Department of Foreign Affairs emphasized the importance of maintaining open communication and ensuring de-escalation of the situation. It expressed hope that both countries would address their differences peacefully and in accordance with international law. In a later statement, President Bongbong Marcos said that the Philippines was open to assisting in efforts to restore peace between the two nations.
- Singapore: The Ministry of Foreign Affairs expressed serious concern about the ongoing clashes and urged both countries to cease hostilities, de-escalate tensions through diplomatic channels, and ensure the safety of civilians.
- Timor-Leste: The Government of Timor-Leste approved a resolution urging both sides to cease hostilities and supporting ASEAN's peaceful dispute resolution mechanisms.
- Vietnam: The Ministry of Foreign Affairs called on both sides to exercise utmost restraint, refrain from the use of force, and resolve their differences peacefully in accordance with international law and regional solidarity.

==== Elsewhere ====
- Australia: A spokesperson for the Department of Foreign Affairs and Trade stated that the Australian government was "deeply concerned" by reports of clashes along the Thai–Cambodian border, including the shelling of residential areas. Foreign Minister Penny Wong urged both sides to de-escalate tensions and resolve the dispute peacefully.
- Bangladesh: The Ministry of Foreign Affairs welcomed the ceasefire between Thailand and Cambodia, expressing hope that both nations would continue to pursue a lasting solution through diplomatic means.
- Brazil: The Ministry of Foreign Affairs advised Brazilian citizens to avoid travel to the border region until the cessation of hostilities, urging both parties to show restraint and to seek a peaceful resolution.
- Canada: The Government of Canada voiced grave concern over reports of civilian casualties near the border and called on both sides to de-escalate hostilities and engage in dialogue to reach a peaceful settlement.
- China: Foreign Ministry spokesperson Guo Jiakun expressed concern over developments and urged both nations to resolve differences through dialogue and consultation. Wang Yi, Director of the Office of the Central Foreign Affairs Commission, described the conflict as "heartbreaking" and attributed it to "the legacy of colonialism," while reaffirming China's support for ASEAN's mediation efforts and a "fair and impartial" stance.
- France: The Government of France expressed deep concern over the armed clashes and offered condolences to the victims. It urged both parties to cease fighting immediately and resolve their differences in accordance with international law.
- Vatican City: Pope Leo XIV offered prayers for those affected by the border violence.
- India: The Ministry of External Affairs stated that it was closely monitoring the situation, urging all parties to end hostilities and prevent further escalation. It later issued a travel advisory for citizens in Cambodia.
- Japan: Foreign Minister Takeshi Iwaya conveyed Japan's "deep concern" over the situation and called for restraint and peaceful dialogue. Japan subsequently provided US$1.8 million in emergency aid to affected border communities. Japan's Press Secretary Kitamura Toshihiro stated "The improvement of relations between Cambodia and Thailand is indispensable for the stability and development of the entire region." on 8 December
- Kyrgyzstan: The Ministry of Foreign Affairs expressed hope that peace would be restored promptly along the Cambodia–Thailand border.
- New Zealand: The Ministry of Foreign Affairs and Trade expressed concern in an updated travel advisory, urging diplomacy and moderation while supporting ASEAN efforts to defuse tensions.
- Norway: The Ministry of Foreign Affairs voiced alarm over the escalating situation, urging both sides to cease hostilities and pursue peaceful dialogue.
- Pakistan: The Ministry of Foreign Affairs commended ongoing peace negotiations, emphasizing the importance of diplomacy and regional cooperation.
- Russia: Foreign Ministry spokesperson Maria Zakharova expressed concern over the escalation and called for restraint and dialogue to achieve a peaceful settlement.
- Saudi Arabia: The Government of Saudi Arabia urged caution and diplomacy, calling for de-escalation and a peaceful resolution to the border dispute.
- South Korea: The Ministry of Foreign Affairs expressed "grave concern" over the military clash and called for de-escalation and dialogue.
- Sri Lanka: The Government of Sri Lanka called on both sides to engage in early diplomatic dialogue aimed at resolving their differences peacefully.
- Switzerland: The Federal Department of Foreign Affairs urged all parties to halt violence immediately and avoid further escalation.
- Ukraine: The Ukrainian Embassy in Bangkok advised citizens to comply with local authorities and avoid border regions.
- United Kingdom: Parliamentary Under-Secretary of State for the Indo-Pacific Catherine West expressed distress over civilian casualties and called for restraint and dialogue.
- United States: The U.S. embassies in Bangkok and Phnom Penh issued advisories urging American citizens to follow security directives. Later, U.S. Department of State spokesperson Thomas Pigott called for an immediate cessation of hostilities and the pursuit of peaceful dialogue.
- Uzbekistan: The Ministry of Foreign Affairs stated that it was monitoring developments closely and called for adherence to international law and peaceful resolution of the dispute.

=== Inter-governmental organizations ===
- ASEAN: ASEAN Foreign Ministers collectively expressed deep concern over the situation, called both sides to cease all hostilities, strictly undertake ceasefire, and endorsed negotiations.
- European Union: Foreign affairs spokesperson Anouar El Anouni expressed his concern on behalf of the bloc and called for de-escalation from both sides and to resolve the conflict with peaceful dialogue.
- United Nations: UN secretary-general António Guterres stated that he is following with concern reports of armed clashes at the border between Cambodia and Thailand and urged both sides to exercise maximum restraint and address any issues through dialogue and in a spirit of good neighborliness, with a view to finding a lasting solution to the dispute.

=== Independent analysis ===
Nathan Ruser, a satellite data analyst at the Australian Strategic Policy Institute (ASPI), and Thai-Australian researcher Angela Atitaya Suriyasenee, assessed that the military tensions leading up to the 24 July 2025 clash originated mainly from the Cambodian side. He noted that Cambodian forces had reinforced multiple positions before the 28 May incident and rapidly deployed further units afterward. According to his analysis, Cambodia was responsible for 33 escalatory actions compared to 14 by Thailand, while nine were joint de-escalatory measures. These findings were based on official situation reports rather than satellite imagery as was widely assumed but the author noted that there was a lack of visual of inside Thailand army movement on the internet.

In a report by its defence analyst and Asia-Pacific editor Ridzwan Rahmat, Janes Information Services likewise observed that Cambodian forces had fortified the border region in advance, with satellite imagery between March and August 2025 showing newly constructed bunkers, access roads, and defensive positions near Trapeang Kul.

A BBC News article by Jonathan Head, its long-time South East Asia correspondent in Bangkok, similarly described the events of 24 July as beginning with a Cambodian rocket barrage into Thailand, followed by retaliatory Thai air strikes.
