= Cambodia–Thailand phone call leak =

2025 political scandal in Thailand

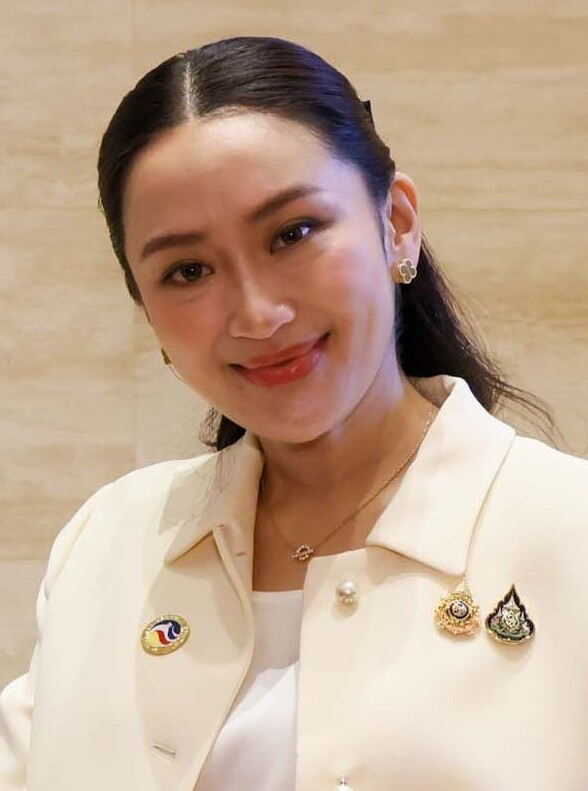
Paetongtarn Shinawatra, Prime Minister of Thailand

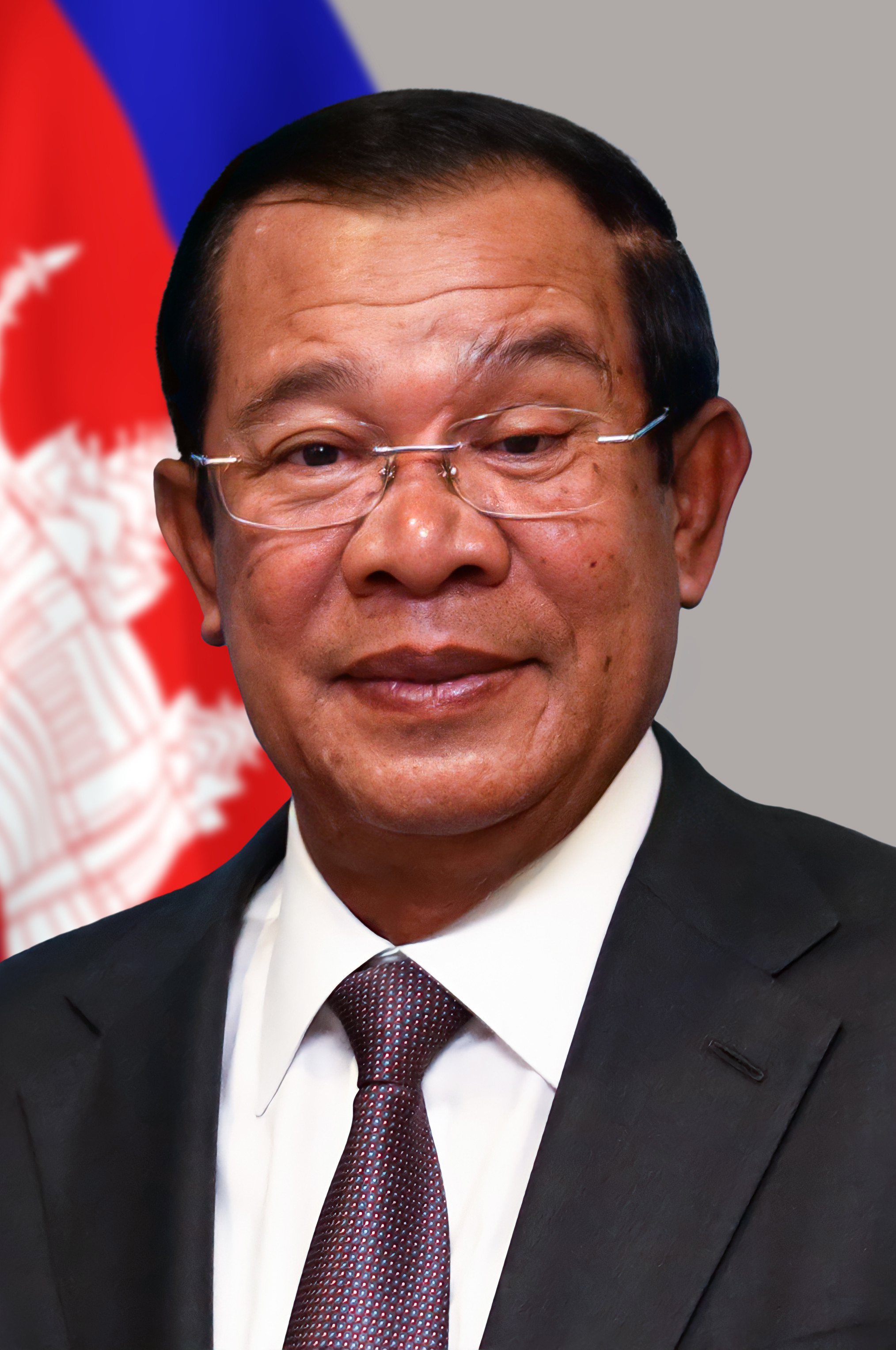
Hun Sen, President of the Senate of Cambodia

On 15 June 2025, Thai Prime Minister Paetongtarn Shinawatra held a 17-minute private phone call with Cambodian Senate President and former Prime Minister Hun Sen to discuss a peaceful resolution to the 2025 Cambodian–Thai border crisis. Deputy Governor of Phnom Penh, Khleang Huot, acted as an interpreter on the call.

On 18 June 2025, a nine-minute audio recording of the call was leaked. Later that day, Hun Sen confirmed he had recorded the full conversation and posted it on his Facebook page.

During the phone call, Paetongtarn referred to Hun Sen as "uncle", as Hun Sen is a longtime friend of her father, Thaksin. Paetongtarn then requested Hun Sen to "please have some sympathy for [his] niece" (Thai: เห็นใจหลานหน่อยเถอะ), and stated that "the people in Thailand are saying that I should just go be the Cambodian prime minister instead" (คนไทยไล่เราให้ไปเป็นนายกฯ ที่เขมรหมดแล้ว). She then offered to Hun Sen that she will take care of anything he needed.

Paetongtarn then said that Boonsin Padklang, a Thai military commander, is saying things that are not beneficial to the nation to look cool. She also referred to the commander as part of the opposing side.

== Reaction and aftermath ==
The leak was received with widespread condemnation of Paetongtarn in Thailand. It led to the resignation of the Bhumjaithai Party from the governing coalition, precipitating the 2025 Thai political crisis.

On 23 June 2025, the Stock Exchange of Thailand index hit the lowest point in over five years, at less than 1,063 points.

On 1 July 2025, Paetongtarn was suspended from office by the Constitutional Court of Thailand, over the phone leak, with a pending case to dismiss her from the prime ministerial role.

On 7 July 2025, the proposed Entertainment Complex Bill which would have legalized casinos was scrapped, due to opposition and the political crisis created by the suspension of the Prime Minister.

On 29 August 2025, the Constitutional Court ruled 6–3 against Shinawatra, officially removing her from office.
