= Hieng =

Hieng is a given name and surname. Notable people with the name include:

- Andrej Hieng, Slovene writer, playwright and theatre director
- Hing Bun Hieng, Cambodian general and head of the Prime Minister's Bodyguard Unit
- Law Hieng Ding, Malaysian politician
