= Chong Ahn Ma =

Mountain located on the Cambodia-Thailand border (Now in Thailand)

Chong Ahn Ma (Thai: ช่องอานม้า) or An Ses (Khmer: អានសេះ) is a hill located on the Cambodia–Thailand border. The area is contested by both Thailand and Cambodia, and has been a major flashpoint in the 2008–2013 and 2025 border conflicts between the two countries.

== 2025 Border conflict ==
During the 2025 Cambodia‒Thailand conflict, Thailand claimed to have occupied both Chong Ahn Ma and the Phu Makhuea peaks.
