= Prasat Ta Krabey =

11th-century temple

- Location within Thailand Location within Cambodia

Religion
- Affiliation: Hinduism
- Deity: Shiva

Location
- Location: Cambodia–Thailand border
- Coordinates: 14°21′10″N 103°22′24″E

Architecture
- Type: Khmer
- Completed: 11th century

Prasat Ta Krabey (Khmer: ប្រាសាទតាក្របី) or Prasat Ta Khwai (Thai: ปราสาทตาควาย) is a temple built under the Khmer kings Suryavarman I and Udayadityavarman II during the Angkor period. The 11th–century religious site was dedicated to the Hindu god Shiva.

Before the Cambodian–Thai border dispute in 2025, this temple was an tourist attraction in both Cambodia and Thailand.

== Etymology ==
Prasat Ta Khwai or Prasat Ta Krabey both literally mean "Grandfather Buffalo Temple".

The word "Prasat" in both (Thai: ปราสาท) and (Khmer: ប្រាសាទ) is derived from the Sanskrit word (prāsāda) (Sanskrit: प्रासाद), meaning temple. The word "Ta" (Thai: ตา) and (Khmer: តា) means grandfather, while "Khwai" in (Thai: ควาย) and "Krabei" in (Khmer: ក្របី) mean buffalo.

== Plan and features ==
Ta Krabey temple consists of a single central sanctuary, which houses a Shiva Linga, named Svayabhuva Linga, which means the self-emergence Linga and four gopuras face to all four directions in total area of 900 square meters. This laterite temple was decorated with some carvings, especially the depiction of god Yama mounts on a buffalo as his vehicle, however the construction work of the temple was unfinished as most of the exterior surface of the central tower has no carving.

== Location ==
The temple is located in the Dangrek mountain range, along the disputed Cambodia—Thailand border.

From the Cambodia side, it is about 85 km from the capital of Oddar Meanchey province. From the Thailand side, it lies within Ban Thai Niyom Phatthana, Village No. 17, Bak Dai Subdistrict, Phanom Dong Rak district, Surin province, approximately 12 km east of another Angkorian temple, Prasat Ta Muen Thom.

== History ==
=== Early history ===
According to its architectural style, The temple was built in the 12th or 13th century in the Bayon architectural style, although it is believed that construction began in the 11th century. The temple is located on the Dangrek mountain range, and its surroundings are now covered by jungle.

=== Border disputes ===
Ownership of the temple has been subject to the Cambodian–Thai border dispute, and military clashes near the temple occurred in 2008 and 2011.

At the start of the 2025 Cambodian–Thai border crisis on July 24, 2025, Cambodian forces reportedly occupied the Temple. Three days later, on July 27, both countries claimed sovereignty over the area. Subsequently, on July 30, a Thai army spokesman acknowledged that the Cambodian army had seized control of the temple grounds following clashes.

However, on 15 December 2025, Thailand was able to retake the temple, and there are plans to restore it in the future following the resolution of the Cambodia–Thailand border dispute. On 27 December 2025, Cambodia and Thailand agreed to a ceasefire, halting military operations in the area. The temple sustained damage during the clashes, and subsequent assessments indicated that it remains technically restorable once stable civilian control and security conditions are in place.

== See also ==
- Prasat Ta Muen Thom
