= Boonsin Padklang =

Thai military officer (born 1965)

General Boonsin Padklang PCh PM
- บุญสิน พาดกลาง
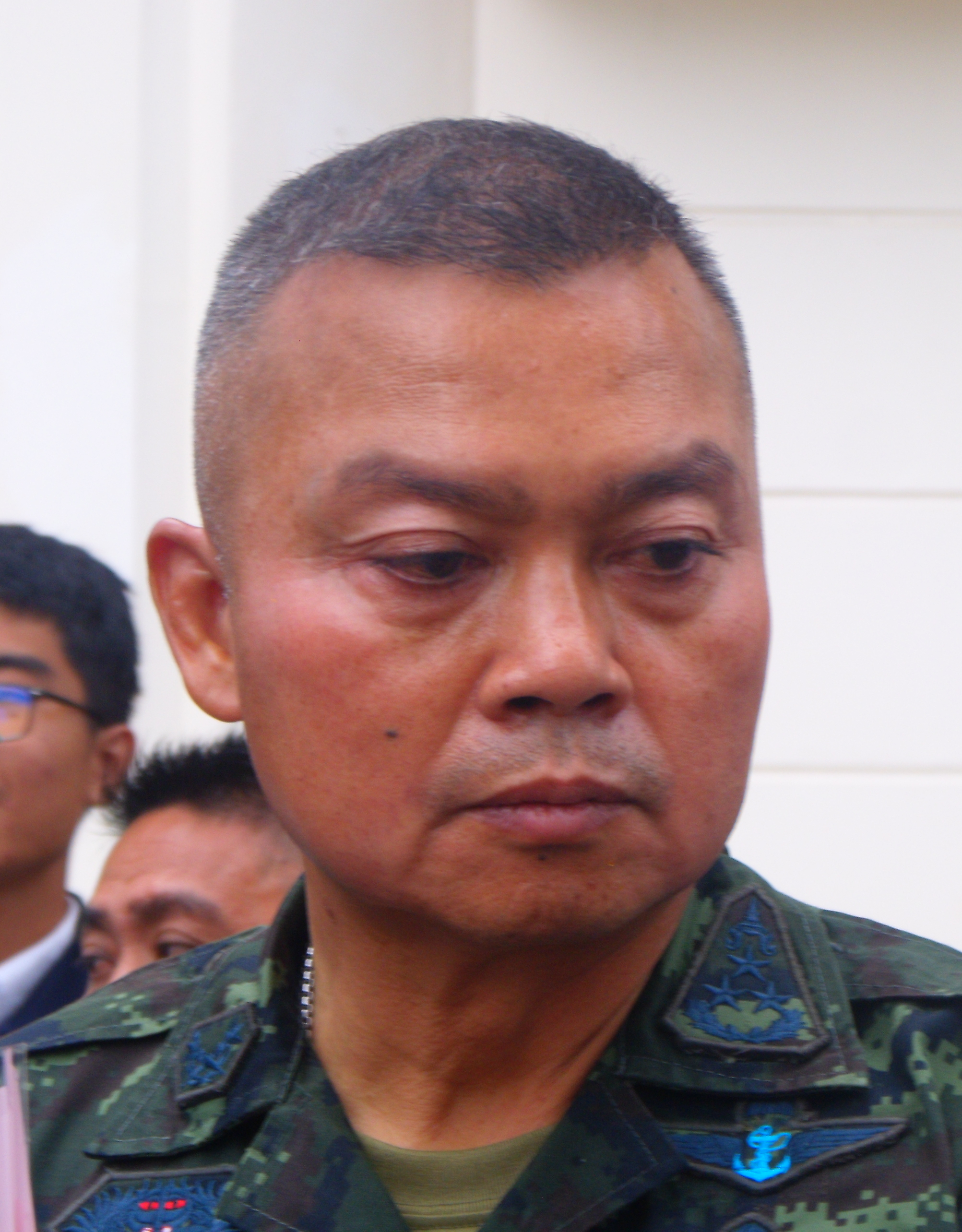
- Boonsin in 2025

Commander of the 2nd Army Area
- In office 1 October 2024 – 30 September 2025
- Preceded by: Adul Boonthamcharoen
- Succeeded by: Weerayut Raksin

Personal details
- Born: 22 September 1965 (age 60) Ban Dung, Udon Thani, Thailand
- Spouse: Supangphan Phadklang
- Nickname: Kung

Military service
- Allegiance: Thailand
- Branch: Royal Thai Army
- Years of service: 1990–2025
- Rank: General
- Commands: 2nd Army Area; 6th Infantry Division; 3rd Infantry Division; 3rd Infantry Regiment
- Battles/wars: South Thailand Insurgency; 2025 Cambodia–Thailand border conflict

Boonsin Padklang (Thai: บุญสิน พาดกลาง, born 22 September 1965) is a retired Royal Thai Army officer who served as commander of the 2nd Army Area from 2024 to 2025. He held senior command positions in infantry and regional formations, with responsibility for military administration and border security operations in northeastern Thailand. He came to wider public attention during the 2025 Cambodia–Thailand border crisis and related political controversy involving a leaked telephone conversation between Thai Prime Minister Paetongtarn Shinawatra and Cambodian Senate President Hun Sen.

== Early life and education ==
Boonsin was born in Ban Dung district, Udon Thani province, in 1965. He was raised in the same district, where his father served as a junior police officer during counter-communist operations in the Cold War period, which formed part of his early exposure to security-related state service.

He attended the Armed Forces Academies Preparatory School (class 26), followed by the Chulachomklao Royal Military Academy (class 37), where he earned a Bachelor’s degree in Mechanical Engineering (Thai: วิศวกรรมเครื่องกล). He later completed advanced military education at the Royal Thai Army Command and General Staff College (class 77).

== Military career ==
Boonsin was commissioned as an infantry officer in the Royal Thai Army and served in a variety of command and staff positions in infantry and regional formations.

He later commanded the 3rd Infantry Regiment and the 3rd Infantry Division before being appointed commander of the 2nd Army Area in 2024.

His military service included operational assignments during the South Thailand insurgency.

=== 2nd Army Area command (2024–2025) ===
During his command, the 2nd Army Area coordinated with civilian agencies on border surveillance, transnational crime prevention, and security operations along Thailand’s frontiers with Laos and Cambodia. In 2025, Boonsin was key in handling security during the tensions at the Thai–Cambodian border, managing military readiness, surveillance, border control, and planning for emergencies while also facilitating communication between military forces and coordinating regional border efforts to help prevent further conflicts.

Following a series of border incidents in July 2025, he directed ground security operations under the Royal Thai Army’s "Yuttabodin operation" through the Suranaree Task Force and coordinated activities with supporting units from the Army, Navy, Air Force, and Border Patrol Police. Military operations were subsequently suspended after a ceasefire agreement was reached through diplomatic negotiations between Thailand and Cambodia.

=== 2025 Cambodian–Thai border crisis and political controversy ===
During the 2025 Cambodian–Thai border crisis, Boonsin Padklang was mentioned in a phone conversation between Prime Minister Paetongtarn Shinawatra and Cambodian Senate President and former Prime Minister Hun Sen.

The conversation was later leaked, resulting in political controversy in Thailand and public criticism of Prime Minister Paetongtarn Shinawatra’s handling of civil–military relations.

Following the incident, Boonsin stated that he had spoken with the prime minister and that he “had no issue with her and that I understood her”.

== Public profile ==
Following his retirement from military service, Boonsin continued to participate in public lectures and educational activities. Media reports indicated that his talks frequently focused on national security, public leadership, and decision-making during crisis situations.

Boonsin delivered lectures at educational institutions, military academies, and public organizations across Thailand, where he discussed experiences related to leadership, border security, and public service.

=== Political views ===
According to media reports and public lectures, Boonsin stated that military coups were outdated and that political conflicts should be resolved through democratic and political processes.

Boonsin also stated that he did not intend to enter politics despite public speculation regarding possible political appointments, saying that he preferred to remain outside partisan politics and continue contributing to public and security affairs in a non-political capacity.

=== Media portrayal ===
Boonsin received increased media attention following the 2025 Cambodia–Thailand border conflict and the Thailand–Cambodia phone call leak. Thai media frequently referred to him by the nicknames "Big Kung" (บิ๊กกุ้ง) and "Mae Thap Kung" (แม่ทัพกุ้ง), derived from his nickname "Kung".

Some media commentary described Boonsin using symbolic or heroic language in relation to his role during the border tensions, while such portrayals formed part of broader public and media discussion surrounding the conflict.

== Post-retirement roles ==
Following his retirement from active military service, Boonsin was appointed as a Special Royal Guard officer under a royal command issued in September 2025. The appointment forms part of the Royal Security Command system, which is responsible for the protection of the monarch and members of the Thai royal family, and is regarded as a ceremonial and prestigious designation within the Royal Thai Armed Forces.

Subsequently, under a royal command issued in December 2025, Boonsin was promoted from lieutenant general to the rank of general as a special case, together with military rank promotions and royal decorations conferred upon Special Royal Guard officers.

In addition, he was appointed adviser to the Commander-in-Chief of the Royal Thai Army, General Phana Khlaeoplotthuk, in 2025. He and General Phana were classmates throughout their military education, attending the Armed Forces Academies Preparatory School, the Chulachomklao Royal Military Academy, and the Command and General Staff College.

Boonsin also serves as a special adviser to the secretary of the King Prajadhipok's Institute (KPI) and as director of the institute's Advanced Course in Enhancing Social Peace.

== Publications ==
Boonsin authored a memoir titled Chiwit Thi Mai Khit Siachai (ชีวิตที่ไม่คิดเสียใจ, "A Life Without Regret"), published in 2026. The book reflects on his military career, leadership experiences, and perspectives on national security and public service.

== Awards and recognition ==
Boonsin received several public and institutional awards in recognition of his military service, public leadership, and contributions to society. In June 2025, he received a certificate of recognition from the Thai government as an "Outstanding Individual" for contributions to narcotics prevention and suppression, particularly through border interdiction measures and inter-agency coordination against drug trafficking.

Among his public recognitions were the Rattanobol Award from Ubon Ratchathani University, the Phra That Phanom Honorary Pin from Nakhon Phanom University, the National Outstanding Father Award, and the Person of the Year Award from the Association of the King Prajadhipok's Institute.

He also received honorary doctoral degrees from several Thai universities in recognition of public service and leadership, including Mahasarakham University, Rajamangala University of Technology Tawan-ok, Rangsit University, and Vongchavalitkul University.

== Honours ==
- 2023 – Knight Grand Cross (First Class) of The Most Exalted Order of the White Elephant
- 2020 – Knight Grand Cross (First Class) of The Most Noble Order of the Crown of Thailand
- 1994 – Freemen Safeguarding Medal (Second Class, Second Category)
- 2010 – Border Service Medal
- 2006 – Chakra Mala Medal
