= Khleang Huot =

Cambodian politician

- ឃ្លាំង ហួត

Deputy Governor of Phnom Penh
- Incumbent
- Assumed office 29 July 2022
- Monarch: Norodom Sihamoni
- Prime Minister: Hun Sen; Hun Manet
- Governor: Khuong Sreng

Khleang Huot (Khmer: ឃ្លាំង ហួត) is a Cambodian politician, serving as Deputy Governor of Phnom Penh since 2022. Khleang is also an advisor to Cambodian Senate President and former Prime Minister Hun Sen, and a member of the ruling Cambodian People’s Party’s Central Committee.

== Phone call leak ==
On 15 June 2025, amidst the 2025 Cambodian–Thai border crisis, Khleang served as the interpreter for the phone call between Thai Prime Minister Paetongtarn Shinawatra and Hun Sen. Hun Sen recorded the call, later sharing it with 80 individuals, including politicians and members of Cambodia's armed forces. The call was later leaked, leading to calls for Paetongtarn to resign from her position and precipitating the 2025 Thai political crisis.

== Personal life ==
Khleang speaks fluent Khmer and Thai.
