= Phu Makhuea =

Mountain located on the Cambodia-Thailand border (Now in Thailand)

- Phnom Trap
- Location within Thailand Location within Cambodia

Highest point
- Coordinates: 14.401667°N 104.658056°E

Naming
- Native name: ภูมะเขือ (Thai); ភ្នំត្រប់ (Khmer)

Geography
- Location: Cambodia–Thailand border
- Parent range: Dongrak

Phu Makhuea (Note: Thai: ภูมะเขือ, also spelt Phu Makhua, Phu Makua, etc.) (as it is known in Thai) or Phnom Trap (as it is known in Khmer) is a hill located on the Cambodia–Thailand border, near Preah Vihear. The area is contested by both Thailand and Cambodia, and has been a major flashpoint in the 2008–2013 and 2025 border conflicts between the two countries.

During the 2008 conflict, a request for interpretation was submitted to the International Court of Justice, which ruled that its 1962 ruling which had awarded sovereignty over the temple to Cambodia, did not extend to Phnom Trap, the dispute over which would need to be solved through bilateral means. The hill saw extensive fighting after clashes erupted in the 2025 conflict.

== September 2025 ==
In 2025, during the Cambodian–Thai border crisis, Royal Thai Army Rangers captured Phu Makuea (Phnom Trap) from Cambodian forces. The hill has remained under Thai control up to September 2025, although its sovereignty continues to be disputed by Cambodia.
