= Hing Bun Hieng =

Cambodian general and head of the Prime Minister's Bodyguard Unit

- ហ៊ីង ប៊ុនហ៊ាង

Deputy Commander-in-Chief of the Royal Cambodian Armed Forces
- Prime Minister: Hun Sen

Personal details
- Born: 1 January 1957 (age 69) Kampuchea
- Children: Hing Chamroeun

Military service
- Allegiance: Cambodia
- Branch/service: Royal Cambodian Armed Forces
- Rank: General

Lieutenant General Hing Bun Hieng (born 1957, Khmer: ហ៊ីង ប៊ុនហ៊ាង; also spelt Hing Bun Heang) is a Cambodian general and the commander of the Prime Minister Hun Sen's personal bodyguard unit. As of March 2022, he held the rank of lieutenant general.

In June 2018, the United States government sanctioned Bun Hieng for human rights abuses, specifically his role in multiple attacks against unarmed Cambodians dating back to 1997. In July 2020, he was appointed as a supreme advisor to Tep Vong, the Supreme Patriarch of Cambodia, and Bour Kry, the head of Cambodia's Dhammayuttika Nikaya order. In December 2001, the Judicial Court of Paris issued arrest warrants for Bun Hieng and Huy Piseth for orchestrating a grenade attack at a political rally in Phnom Penh on 30 March 1997. The attack, which preceded the 1997 Cambodian coup d'état, killed 16, and injured more than 150 individuals.

== Personal life ==
Bun Hieng's son, Hing Chamroeun, is also a member of the Prime Minister's Bodyguard Unit.
