= Emerald Triangle (Southeast Asia) =

Shared border region between Cambodia, Laos and Thailand

The Emerald Triangle is the shared border region between Cambodia, Laos and Thailand. It includes the area of Chong Bok (Thai: ช่องบก), a mountain pass through the Dangrek Range, which forms much of the natural boundary between Thailand and Cambodia. In Cambodia, the area is known as Mom Bei (Khmer: មុំបី).

The Emerald Triangle name was coined in 2000 as a project for international cooperation to promote tourism and economic development in the area. The name, referring to the area's lush environment, is a play on the pre-existing Golden Triangle region between Laos, Thailand and Myanmar. In the broader sense, the Emerald Triangle covers areas in seven provinces among the three countries: Preah Vihear, Oddar Meanchey and Stung Treng in Cambodia, Salavan and Champasak in Laos, and Ubon Ratchathani and Sisaket in Thailand. In the narrow sense, it refers to the boundary tripoint between the three countries, which lies near the Chong Bok pass. The pass has an elevation of 330 metres (1,080 ft).

From 1985 to 1987, during the Third Indochina War, the Chong Bok area was a site of armed clashes as Vietnamese forces made incursions into the Cambodian–Thai border region where the Khmer Rouge were based. Following the end of hostilities, a pavilion was built at the tripoint as a symbol of amity in 1993.

== See also ==
- Cambodia–Laos border
- Cambodia–Thailand border
- Laos–Thailand border
