= RTAF Security Force Command =

- หน่วยบัญชาการอากาศโยธิน กองทัพอากาศไทย
- Active: Late 1937-present
- Country: Thailand
- Branch: Royal Thai Air Force
- Type: Air force infantry and special forces
- Size: 20,000
- Garrison/HQ: Don Muang Royal Thai Air Force Base, Bangkok, Thailand
- Website: https://sfc.rtaf.mi.th/index.php/page-main

The RTAF Security Force Command (Thai: หน่วยบัญชาการอากาศโยธิน) is a Division size unit in the Royal Thai Air Force. It has been in existence since 1937. They are based near Don Mueang International Airport. The RTAF Security Force Command is the main air force ground forces and special forces which providing light infantry for anti-hijacking capabilities, protecting air bases and high value assets, protecting international airport in insurgent areas. It also serves as the Royal Thai Air Force Special Operations Regiment (RTAF SOR) which consists of various units such as Combat Control Team (CCT), Pararescue Jumpers (PJs), Tactical Air Control Party (TACP).

== History ==
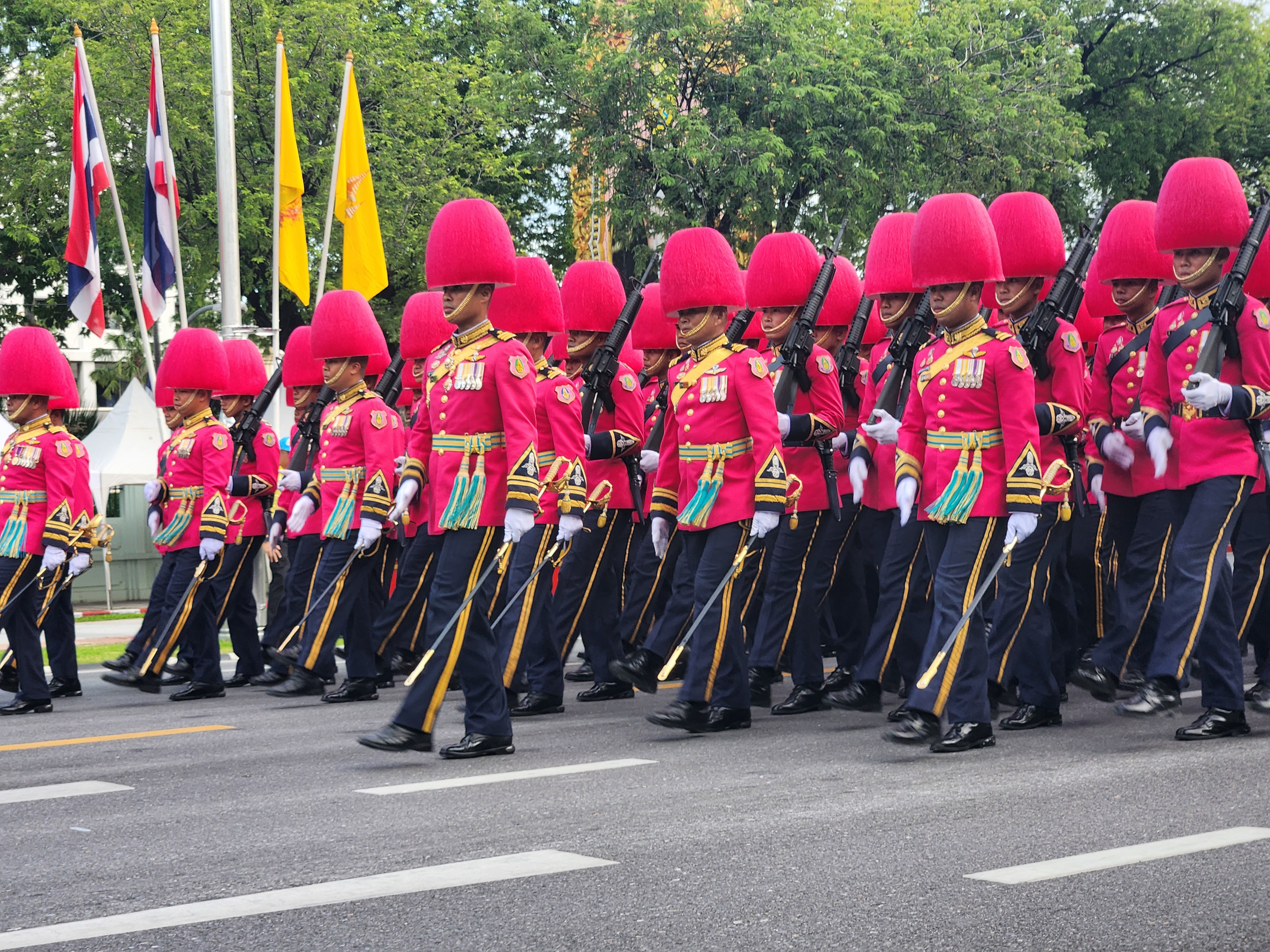
Full dress uniform of the RTAF Security Force Regiment, King's Guard (3rd Security Force Battalion, King's Guard)

Royal Thai Air Force Security Force Command at that time it was called infantry division, established by the influence of RAF Regiment. It organized according to the official rate of the Royal Thai Air Force in 1937 so-called "military regulations on the determination of the Air Force personnel 80" used on 6 September 1937. At the Air Force rate it assigned to has the infantry division consist of commissioned officers, non-commissioned officers and private. This infantry division is up to the Commander of the Wing. The infantry division be stationed on Wing 1 to Wing 5, the first five infantry divisions were the first of its kind in the Royal Air Force that means Security Force Regiment was happened in the air force.

== Organization ==
=== RTAF:Security Force Command ===
Royal Thai Air Force Security Force Command consist of 3 main regiments and multiple support units. Additionally, one separated air base protection battalions and one separated anti-aircraft battalions are station in each air bases.

Air bases of the Royal Thai Air Force
- RTAF: Security Force Training Center
- RTAF: Security Force Regiment, The King's Guard
  - RTAF: 1st Security Force Battalion, The King's Guard
  - RTAF: 2nd Security Force Battalion, The King's Guard
  - RTAF: 3rd Security Force Battalion, The King's Guard
  - RTAF: Security Force Battalion/WING 1
  - RTAF: Security Force Battalion/WING 2
  - RTAF: Security Force Battalion/WING 3
  - RTAF: Security Force Battalion/WING 4
  - RTAF: Security Force Battalion/WING 5
  - RTAF: Security Force Battalion/WING 7
  - RTAF: Security Force Battalion/WING 21
  - RTAF: Security Force Battalion/WING 23
  - RTAF: Security Force Battalion/WING 41
  - RTAF: Security Force Battalion/WING 46
  - RTAF: Security Force Battalion/WING 56
  - RTAF: Security Force Battalion/Flying Training School
- RTAF: Anti - Aircraft Regiment,
  - RTAF: 1st Anti - Aircraft Battalion
  - RTAF: 2nd Anti - Aircraft Battalion
- RTAF: Special Operations Regiment (Commando)
  - RTAF: 1st Special Operation Battalion (Commando)
  - RTAF: 2nd Special Operation Battalion (Pararescuemen)
  - RTAF: 3rd Special Operation Battalion (Combat Control Team)
  - RTAF: Aerial Support Company
  - RTAF: Combat Search and Rescue Center (CSAR) (Pararescuemen)
- RTAF: Music Division

== Equipment ==
=== Small arms ===
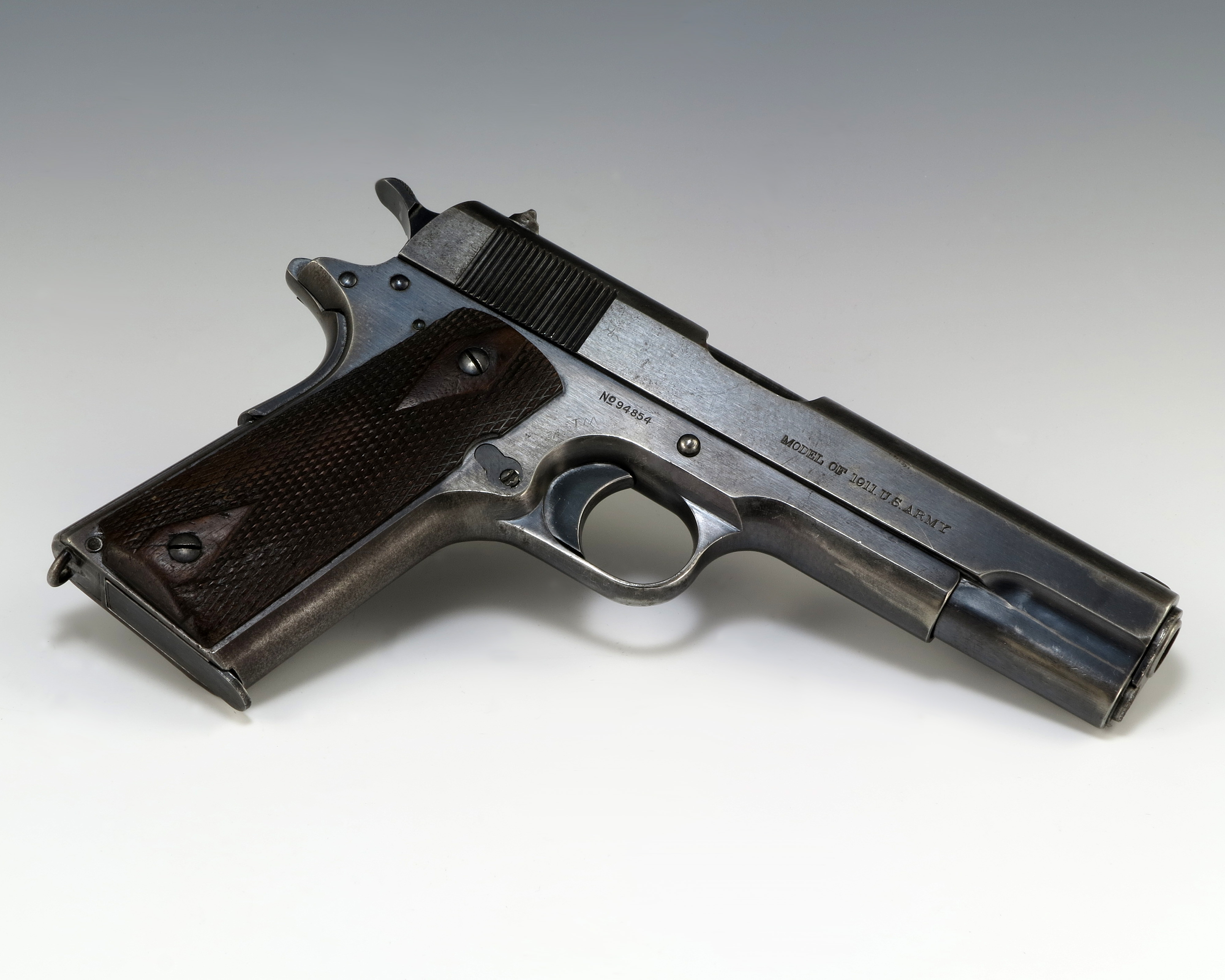
M1911 pistol

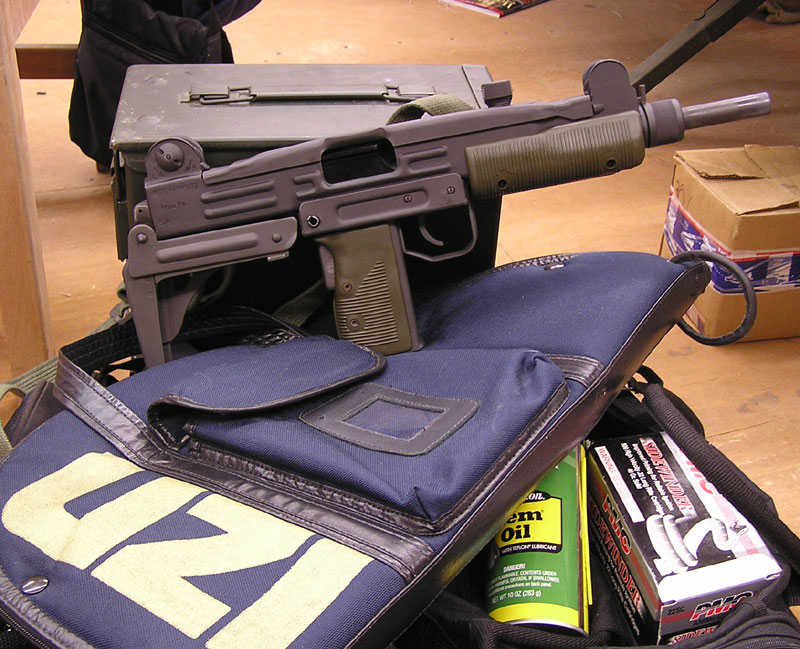
An Uzi submachine gun

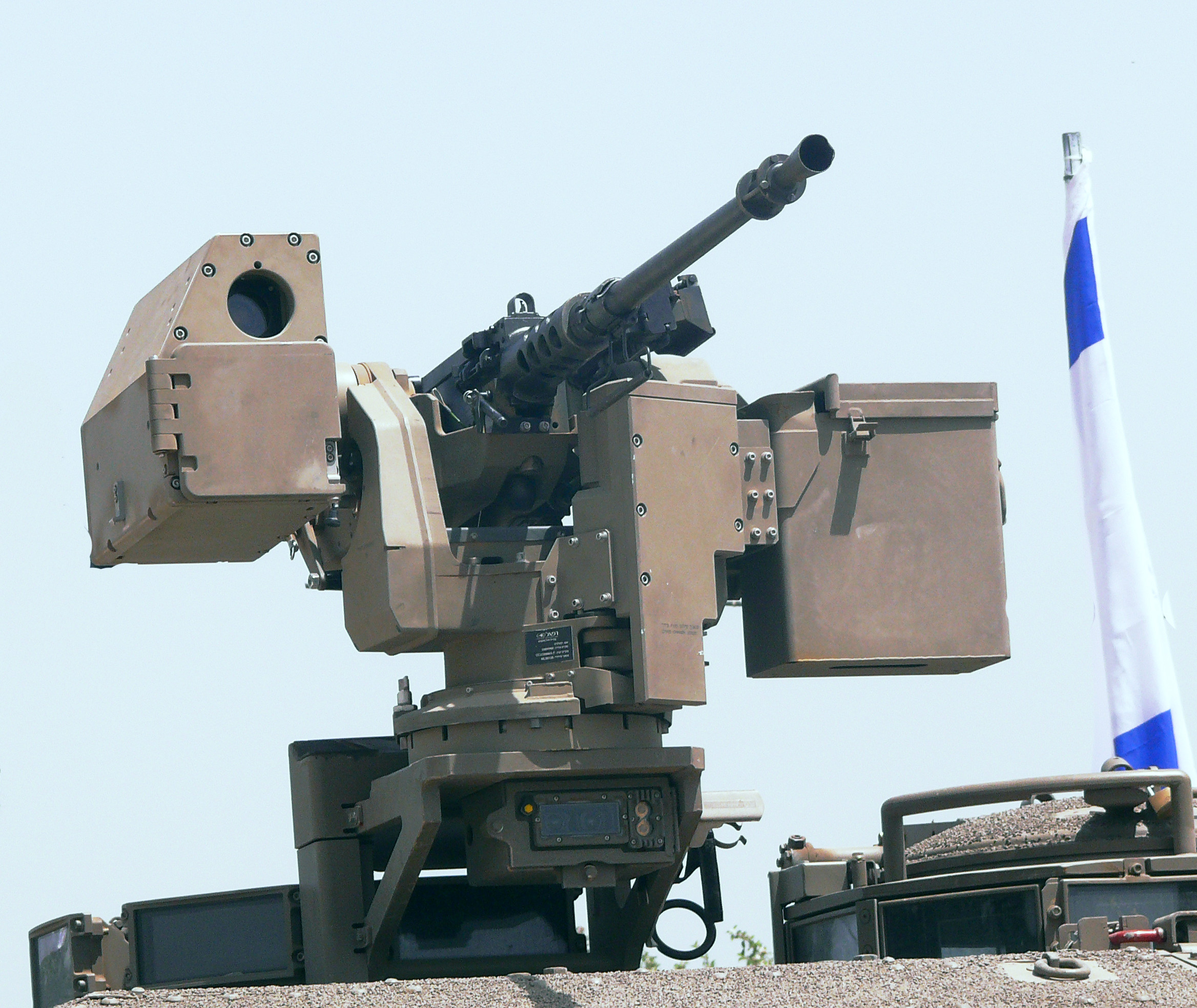
M2 Browning machine gun

Model	Origin	Type	Caliber	Notes
Pistols
M1911 pistol	Thailand/ United States	Semi-automatic pistol	.45 ACP	M1911A1
Smith & Wesson M&P	United States	Semi-automatic pistol	.22 LR	M&P18 M&P15
Colt Commander	United States	Semi-automatic pistol	.38 Super	
Browning Hi-Power	Belgium	Semi-automatic pistol	9×19mm Parabellum	
Shotguns
Remington Model 870	United States	Shotgun	12 gauge	
Assault rifles
M16 rifle	Thailand/ United States	Assault rifle	5.56mm	A1
Heckler & Koch HK33	Thailand/ Germany	Assault rifle	5.56mm	HK33A3
Bushmaster M4-type Carbine	United States	Carbine	5.56mm	
Submachine guns
Uzi	Israel	Submachine gun	9×19mm Parabellum	
Machine guns
M60 machine gun	United States	General purpose machine gun	7.62×51mm NATO	
M2 Browning machine gun	United States	Heavy machine gun	.50 BMG	
Grenade launchers
XM148 grenade launcher	United States	Grenade launcher	40 mm grenade	
M203 grenade launcher	United States	Grenade launcher	40 mm grenade	
Mortars
M1 mortar	United States	Mortar	81 mm mortar	

=== Land vehicles ===
Model	Origin	Type	Quantity	Notes
Cadillac Gage Commando	United States	Armored car	12	With 12.7mm and 7.62mm MG
Condor	Germany	Armored car	18	With 20mm and 7.62mm MG

=== Air-defense weapons ===
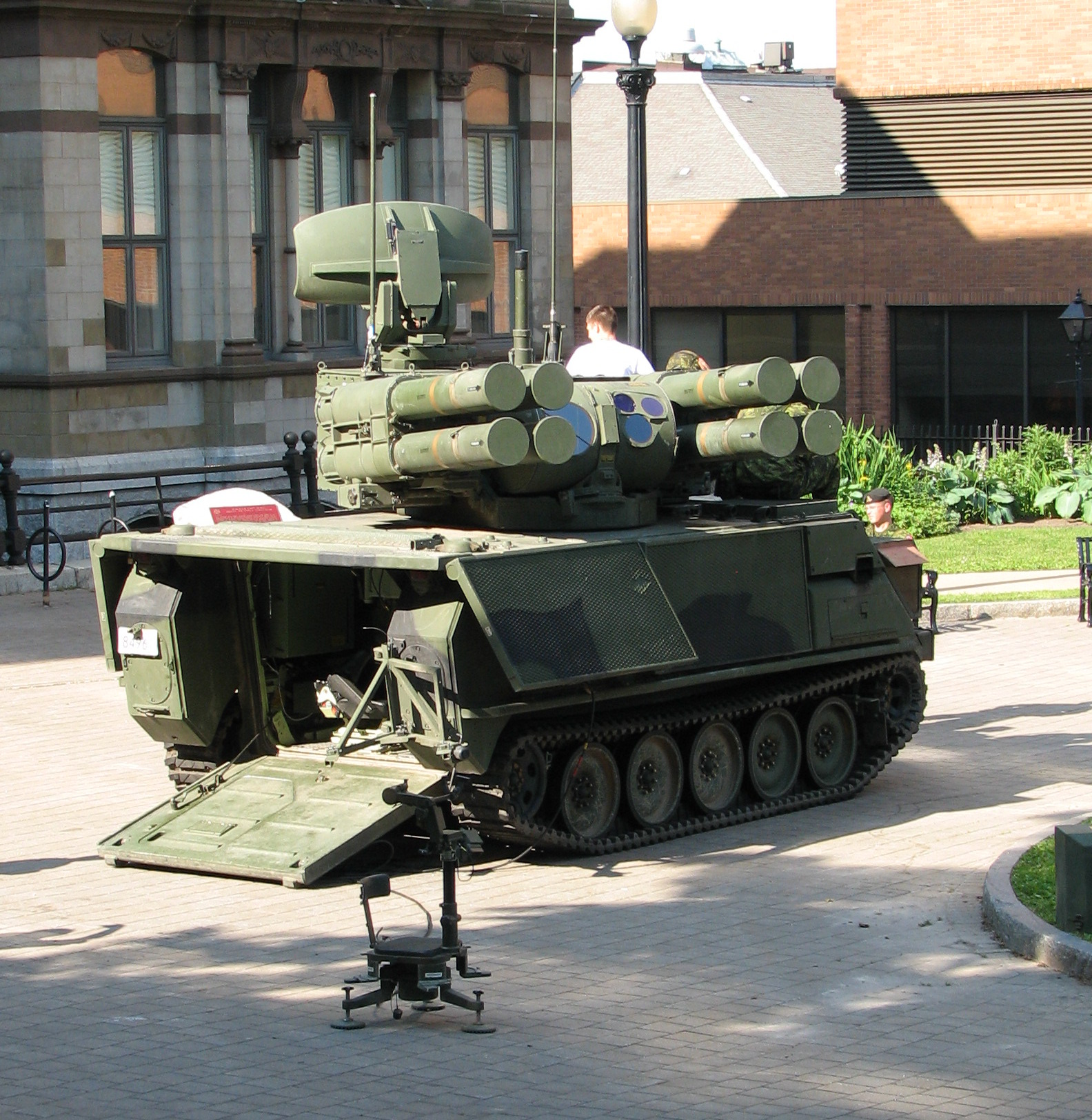
ADATS

Model	Origin	Type	Notes
KS-1C	China	Surface-to-air missile system	1 Battery
ADATS	Switzerland	Laser-guided supersonic missile	4 Fixed emplacement/semi-mobile
RBS 70	Sweden	Man-portable air-defence system	
QW-2 Vanguard 2	China	Man-portable air-defence system	
MK 30	Germany	Anti Aircraft Artillery	MK 30 Rheinmetall Mauser Mod. F - 8 Twin 30mm Anti Aircraft Artillery
Bofors 40mm L/70	Sweden	Anti Aircraft Artillery	40mm Anti Aircraft Artillery
Type 74	China	Anti Aircraft Artillery	Twin 37mm Anti Aircraft Artillery

=== Radar systems ===
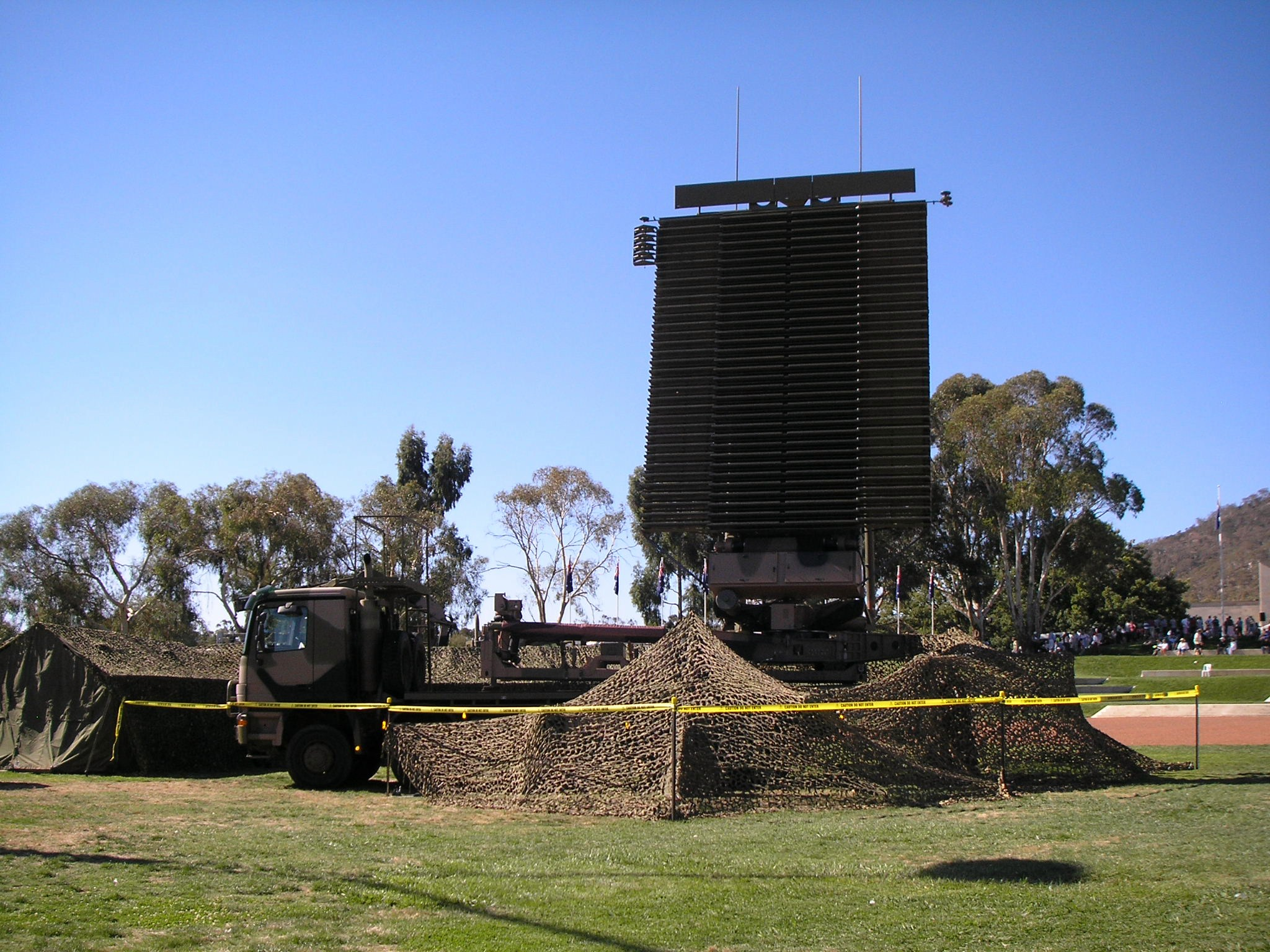
AN/FPS-117

Model	Origin	Type	Notes
AN/FPS-117	United States	Long Range 3D Air Search Radar	RTADS I.
Martello-743D	United Kingdom	Long Range 3D Air Search Radar	RTADS l/ll.
AN/FPS-130X	United States	Long Range 3D Air Search Radar	RTADS lll.
AN/TPS-78	United States	Long Range 3D Air Search Radar	RTADS ll.
AN/TPS-79	United States	Long Range 3D Air Search Radar	RTADS ll.
DR-162 ADV	United States	Short Range 2D Air Search Radar	
AN/TPS-703	United States	Mobile Long Range 3D Air Search Radar	
Giraffe-180/40	Sweden	Mobile Medium Range 2D Air Search Radar	
ASR	Japan	Airport Surveillance Radar	
DWSR-88C	United States	Weather Radar	
TVDR-3501C	United States	Weather Radar	
TVDR-2500C	United States	Mobile Weather Radar	
KRONOS Radar Systems	Italy	Air Search Radar	
C2ADS	Thailand	Air Search Radar	

== See also ==
- Special Forces of Thailand
