= Wing 6 Don Mueang =

Wing 6
- กองบิน 6
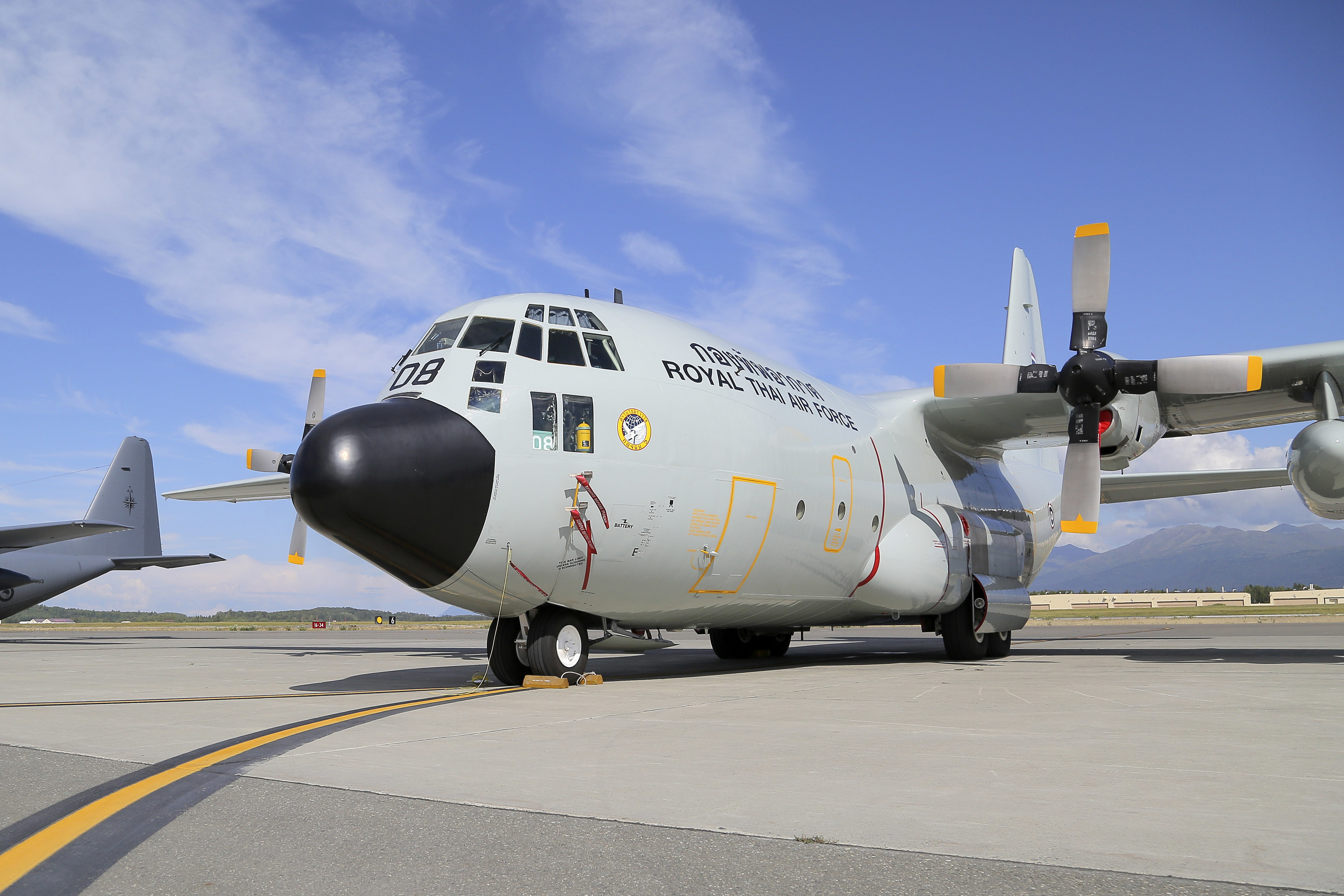
- A C-130H aircraft, registration number C-8 8/33, of Squadron 601, at Joint Base Elmendorf–Richardson, Alaska, USA.
- Active: No. 6 Wing Group (1941–1949); Airlift Wing (1949–1953); No. 6 Wing Group (1953–1963); Wing 6 (1963–present)
- Country: Thailand
- Branch: Royal Thai Air Force
- Type: Air Force wing
- Role: Airlift wing
- Part of: Combat Group, Royal Thai Air Force
- Garrison/HQ: Don Mueang AFB, Don Mueang district, Bangkok
- Motto: Wing 6: Unarmed Warriors

Commanders
- Current commander: Group Captain Wiphawit Phomanee

Insignia
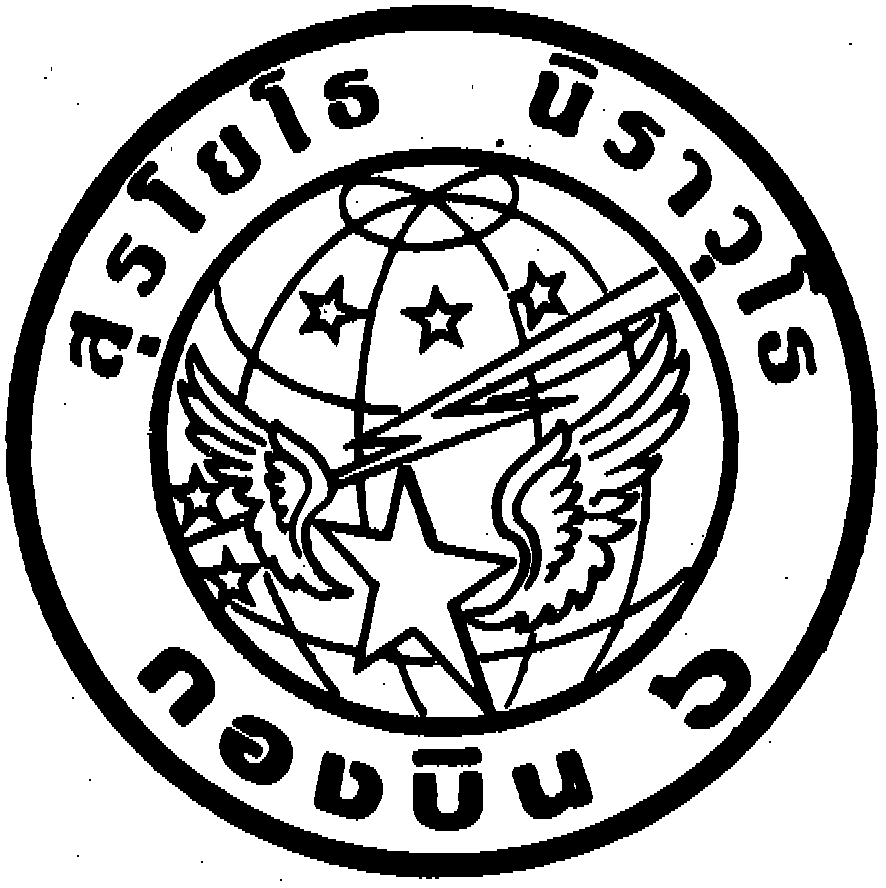
- Emblem of Wing 6

Wing 6 (Thai: กองบิน 6; RTGS: Kong Bin 6) is a transport wing within the Combat Force and a direct unit of the Royal Thai Air Force. It is stationed at Don Mueang AFB, Don Mueang district, Bangkok. The wing was established on 12 April 1941.

== History ==
=== World War II ===
Wing 6 was established on 12 April 1941 and initially served as Thailand's first bomber wing during the Pacific War, under the designation No. 6 Wing Group. Its first commander was Group Captain Sakol Rasanont. The unit consisted of two squadrons, equipped with Martin B-10 (B-3) and Mitsubishi Ki-21 (B-4) based at Don Mueang Air Base, with forces redeployed to other locations as required by wartime conditions, including:

- Lom Sak Airfield
- Ban Phae Airfield
- Ko Kha Airfield
- Khok Kathiam AFB
- Phu Khiao Airfield

In 1946, the unit returned to Don Mueang Air Base, comprising three squadrons: Squadron 61, Squadron 62, and Squadron 63. In 1949, after all bomber aircraft were retired, the unit was renamed from No. 6 Wing Group to the Airlift Wing. New aircraft were introduced, including Beechcraft Model 18 (C-1), Douglas C-47 Skytrain (C-2), Douglas C-54 Skymaster (C-3), North American T-6 Texan (T-8), liaison aircraft, and helicopters. Its missions included airlift operations, central pilot training support, search and rescue, liaison flights, and other assigned tasks.

=== Korean War ===
Between 1951 and 1976, the Royal Thai Air Force transport aviation units participated in the Korean War. Three C-47 (C-2) aircraft departed Thailand on 18 June 1951, arriving at Tachikawa Airfield, Japan, on 23 June 1951. The unit conducted operations with the United Nations forces until 1968, after which it transitioned to Fairchild C-123B Provider (C-4) aircraft. After completing its mission, the unit returned to Thailand on 30 July 1976, totaling 25 years of operational involvement related to the Korean War.

During this period, in 1953, the unit was renamed from Airlift Wing back to No. 6 Wing Group, becoming directly subordinate to the Operations Wing. In 1963, it was redesignated Wing 6, placed directly under the Royal Thai Air Force, a status it has retained to the present day.

== Organization ==
Wing 6 is administratively organized into 2 groups, 4 squadrons, 7 departments, and 1 division, as follows:

=== Groups ===
- Headquarters Group
- Technical Group

=== Squadrons ===
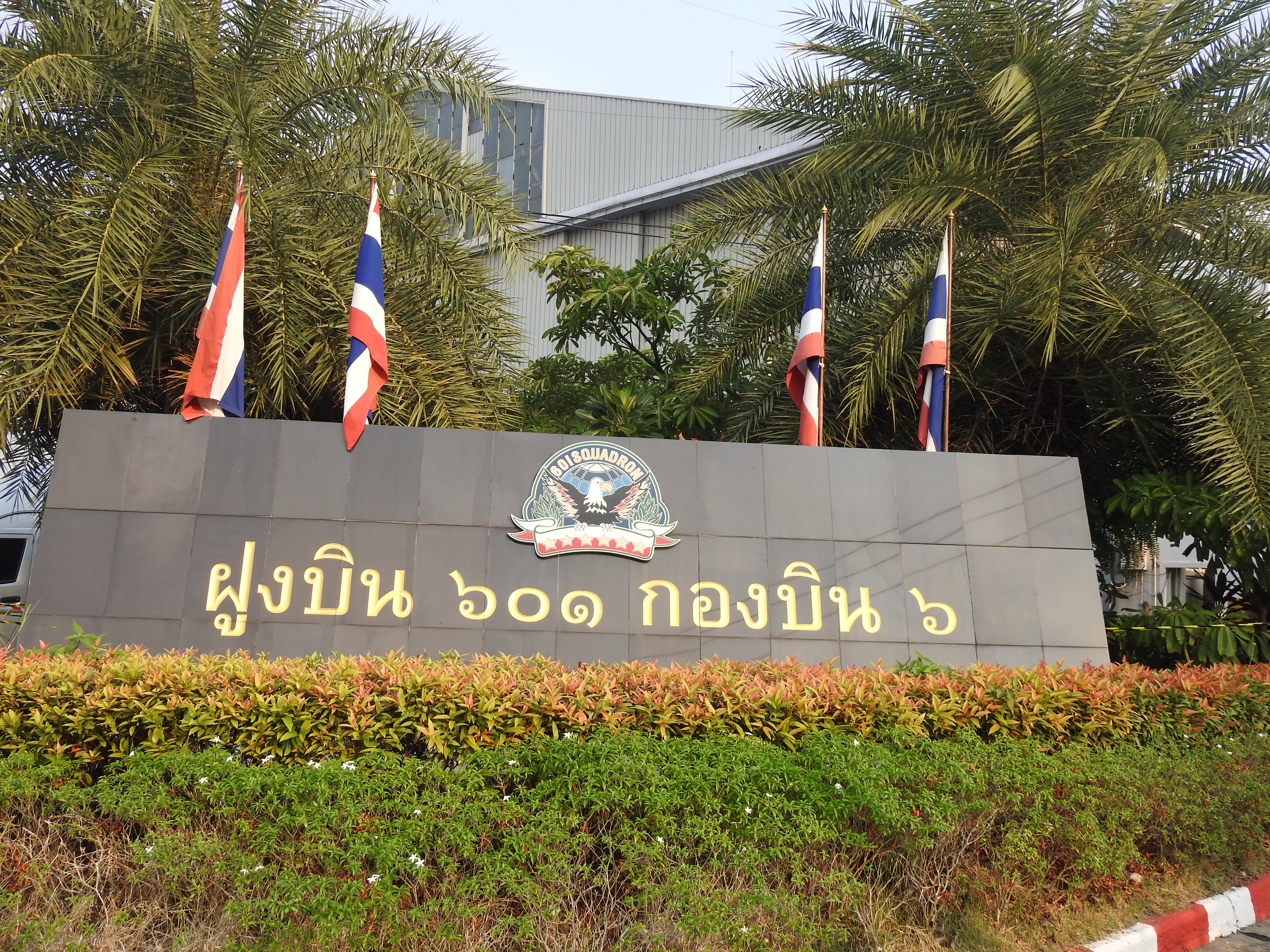
- Sign for 601st Squadron, Wing 6.
  601st Squadron "Lucky"
  - Transport Aircraft Type 8 (C-8): Lockheed C-130 Hercules (short fuselage) and C-130H-30 (stretched fuselage)
- 602nd Squadron "Wihok"
  - Transport Aircraft Type 15 (C-15): Airbus A319
  - Transport Aircraft Type 15A (C-15A): Airbus A320
  - Transport Aircraft Type 19 (C-19): Airbus A340-500
- 603rd Squadron "Cowboy"
  - Transport Aircraft Type 16 (C-16): ATR 72-500
  - Transport Aircraft Type 16A (C-16A): ATR 72-600
  - Transport Aircraft Type 18 (C-18): Sukhoi Superjet 100
- 604th Squadron "Sunny"
  - Training Aircraft Type 14 (T-14): Cessna T-41
  - Training Aircraft Type 16 (T-16): PAC CT/4 Airtrainer
  - Reconnaissance and Transport Aircraft Type 20 (RT-20): Piaggio P.180 Avanti
  - Royal Thai Air Force Aircraft Type 6: RTAF-6
  - Training Aircraft Type 21 (T-21): DA40 NG, DA42 Twin Star

=== Departments ===
- Finance Department
- Flight Operations Support Department
- Civil Engineering Department
- Transportation Department
- Logistics Department
- Welfare Department
- Military Airport Operations Department

=== Other Units ===
- Wing Hospital (Note: Not yet permanently stationed; will be stationed when it moves from its regular location.)
- RTAF Security Force Battalion, Wing 6
- Military Police Company
- Flight Unit 2034 (Note: Support Unit)

== Aircraft ==
Photo	Aircraft	Origin	Role	In service	Notes
601st Squadron
	Lockheed C-130 Hercules	United States	Tactical airlift	12	
602nd Squadron
	Airbus A319	European Union	VIP/Transport	1	
	Airbus A320	European Union	VIP/Transport	2	
	Airbus A340-500	European Union	VIP/Transport	1	
	Boeing 737-400	United States	VIP/Transport	1	
	Boeing 737-800	United States	HM the King's transport	2	
603rd Squadron
	ATR 72-500 ATR 72-600	France	VIP/Transport	3 6	
	Superjet 100LR	Russia	VIP/Transport	2	
604th Squadron
	T-41D Mescalero	United States	Trainer aircraft	36	
	PAC CT/4 Airtrainer	New Zealand	Trainer aircraft		
	Piaggio P.180 Avanti	Italy	Reconnaissance/Transport	1	
	RTAF-6	Thailand	Trainer aircraft		
	Diamond DA40 Diamond Star	Austria	Trainer aircraft	8	

== Location ==
- Wing 6 is located at Don Mueang AFB, where all squadrons are also stationed.

== Task ==
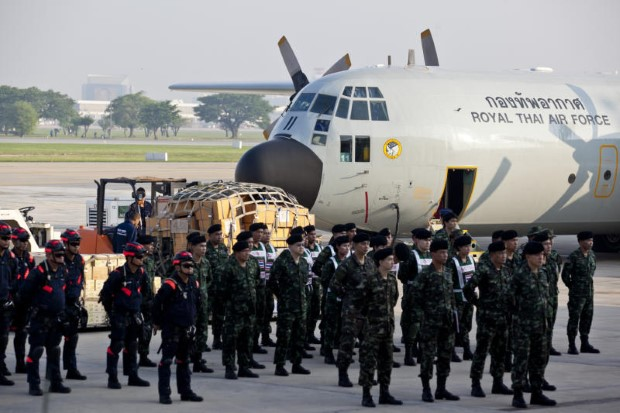
Humanitarian aid delivered during the April 2015 Nepal earthquake.

Wing 6 is a direct unit of the Royal Thai Air Force responsible for a wide range of aviation operations, including:

- Royal and VIP air transport, providing flight operations for His Majesty the King, members of the Royal Family, and other dignitaries
- Airlift operations and aeromedical evacuation
- Wildfire control operations
- Flight training, including the training of cadet pilots, special flight training, and basic training for aircraft commanders
- Support for Royal Thai Air Force civil aviation training units
- Pilot training in aircraft test flying and prototype flight testing

Wing 6 also serves as the primary wing for disaster relief operations, both domestically and internationally, conducting airlift missions to deliver humanitarian assistance from the Thai government to affected populations and to friendly nations. Notable missions include:

- Humanitarian assistance following the April 2015 Nepal earthquake
- Relief operations after the 2023 Turkey–Syria earthquakes
- Flood relief operations in Thailand (2024)

Additionally, Wing 6 has been responsible for the evacuation of Thai nationals from high-risk areas, such as during the Sudanese civil war and the Gaza War
