= 4th Wing =

4th Wing may refer to:

- 4th Fighter Wing, United States Air Force
- Fourth Wing, a novel by Rebecca Yarros

== See also ==
- 4 Wing Cold Lake, Royal Canadian Air Force
- Wing 4 Takhli, Royal Thai Air Force
