= VTBL =

VTBL may refer to:

- Khok Kathiam Air Force Base, ICAO airport code VTBL
- VTBL, a virtual function table in Object Linking and Embedding

== See also ==
- Virtual method table, or vtable
