= Wing 4 Takhli =

Wing 4
- กองบิน 4
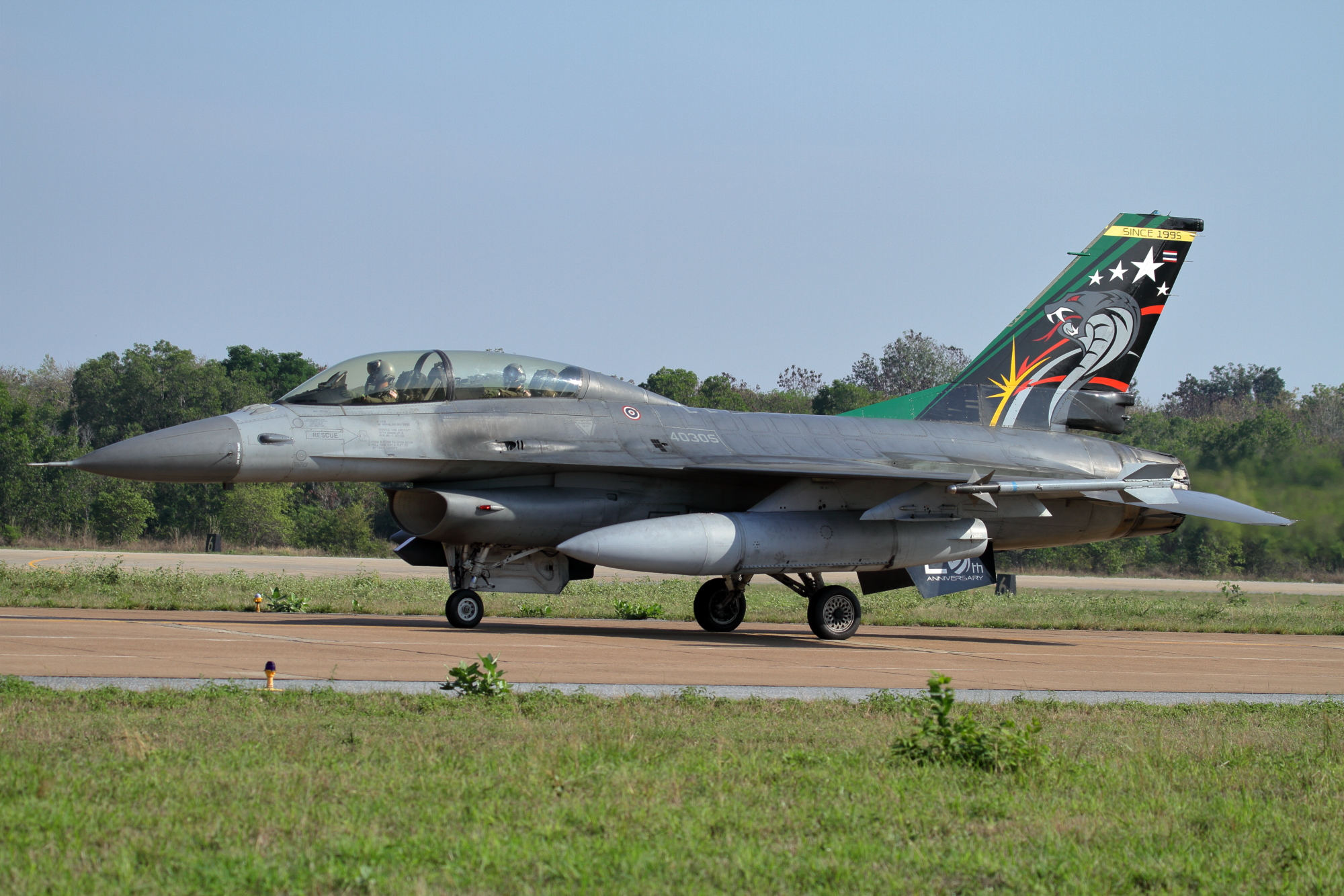
- An F-16B Block 20 MLU of the 403rd Squadron at Korat Air Base during Exercise Cope Tiger 2017
- Active: 1st Army Air Wing (Fighter) (1918–1921); 1st Air Wing (1921–1933); 1st Air Wing Squadron (1933–1936); 4th Air Wing Squadron (1936–1963); Wing 4 (1963–present)
- Country: Thailand
- Branch: Royal Thai Air Force
- Type: Fighter wing
- Role: Fighter
- Part of: Combat Group, Royal Thai Air Force
- Garrison/HQ: Takhli AFB, Takhli District, Nakhon Sawan Province
- Mottos: Land of the King Cobra ดินแดนแห่งชาวจงอาง
- Mascot: Cobra
- Anniversaries: April 15, 1936; 89 years ago
- Engagements: World War II; Burma campaign; Cold War; Indochina wars; Communist insurgency in Thailand; Cambodia–Thailand border dispute; 2025 Cambodia–Thailand conflict
- Website: wing4.rtaf.mi.th

Commanders
- Current commander: Group Captain Worapol Ditkaeo

Insignia
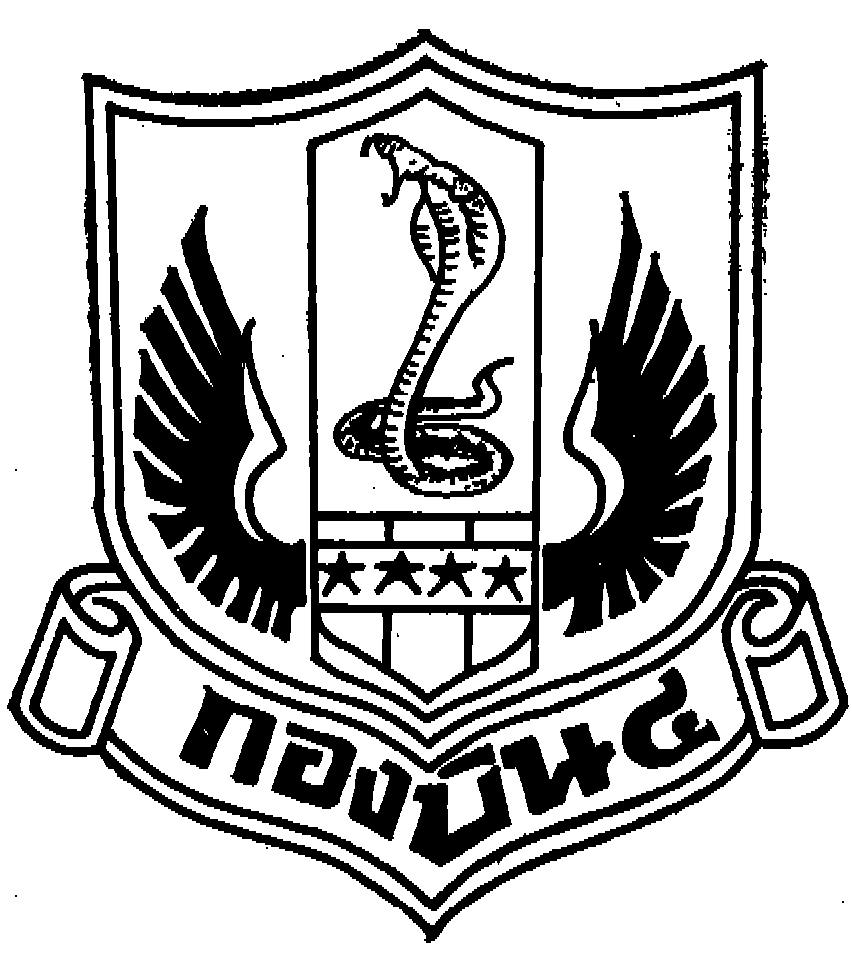
- Official emblem

Wing 4 (Thai: กองบิน 4; RTGS: Kong Bin 4) is a fighter wing within the Combat Group and a direct unit of the Royal Thai Air Force. It is based at Takhli AFB, Takhli District, Nakhon Sawan Province. The wing was established on 15 April 1936.

== History ==
Wing 4 traces its origins to 19 March 1918, when the Army Air Wing was elevated to the Army Aviation Department. The organization was divided into three sections:

1. Army Air Wing
2. Army Flying School
3. Army Aviation Department Factory

Subsequently, the Army Air Wing was expanded into three major wings:

1. 1st Army Air Wing (Fighter), commanded by Second Lieutenant Chit Ruadreo
2. 2nd Army Air Wing (Reconnaissance), commanded by Captain Hem Yotthorn
3. 3rd Army Air Wing (Bomber), commanded by Major Luang Thayan Phikhat, who also concurrently served as commander of the Army Air Wing.

From this establishment, the present-day Wing 4 originated from the 1st Army Air Wing, which was based at Don Mueang Air Base. The headquarters of the 1st Army Air Wing was located at Hangar No. 3.

In 1920, a survey was conducted in Prachuap Khiri Khan Province to relocate the 1st Army Air Wing from Don Mueang. Acting on orders from the director of aviation, Acting Sub-Lieutenant Chit Ruadreo inspected an area in Nong Ai Mek Subdistrict, between Khlong Wan and the Southern Railway Line. A site was selected for the new wing, and land clearing commenced on 8 August 1921 under an agreement with local authorities, led by Phraya Sawatkhiri Srisamantrachanaik, the provincial governor, and Luang Phakdi Dindaen, the deputy provincial officer. The land was leveled using labor from 200 prisoners from the Ratchaburi Provincial Prison, supervised by soldiers of the 14th Infantry Regiment.

On 1 December 1921, a Ministry of Defence order (Army) signed by General Chaophraya Bodindechanuchit (Yaem na Nakhon) renamed the Army Aviation Department as the Aviation Department, and the Army Air Wing as the Air Wing. As a result, the 1st Army Air Wing was redesignated the 1st Air Wing.

Further surveys revealed that the initial site in Prachuap Khiri Khan was unsuitable for the permanent stationing of the 1st Air Wing, but more appropriate for a gunnery flying school. A more suitable location was identified at a cape west of Khao Lom Muak, between Ao Manao and Prachuap Bay. Captain Chit Ruadreo and Second Lieutenant Kap Thatthanon were assigned to survey the area and prepare plans for establishing the gunnery flying school. Construction began in 1921 and was completed on 28 April 1922.

The 1st Air Wing relocated from Don Muang to Prachuap Khiri Khan by train. Captain Luang Amornsakdaowut (Chit Ruatreo) led personnel to formally pay respects to the director of aviation, Colonel Phraya Chalerm Akat, before departing Don Muang on 6 April 1922. After an overnight stay at the 11th Infantry Regiment, the unit continued south to its new base at Ao Manao Subdistrict, Mueang Prachuap Khiri Khan District, where they were welcomed by provincial officials. The wing officially commenced operations at the new location on 9 April 1922.

Due to earlier assessments that Prachuap Khiri Khan was better suited for aerial gunnery training, construction of a new airfield began in early 1924 at Khao Phra Bat Noi, Lopburi Province. Personnel were dispatched to supervise construction, and the 1st Air Wing was relocated from Prachuap Khiri Khan to Khao Phra Bat Noi Airfield, Khok Kathiam Subdistrict, Lopburi Province. Both relocations—from Don Muang to Prachuap Khiri Khan and from Prachuap Khiri Khan to Lopburi—involved only personnel and ground equipment, without aircraft. Aircraft were later transferred from Don Muang Airfield under the leadership of Captain Klom Sukonthasan, accompanied by 12 pilots, ferrying SPAD VII & XIII (F-3), NiD 29 (F-4), and Breguet 14 (B-1) aircraft to Khao Phra Bat Noi Airfield safely. The first aircraft to arrive was piloted by Sergeant Muek Charoenlap.

In 1933, the unit was redesignated from the 1st Air Wing to the 1st Squadron. On 15 April 1936, it was renamed the 4th Squadron, and additional aircraft were assigned, including the Curtiss Hawk II (F-9) and Curtiss Hawk III (F-10).

=== World War II ===
The Second World War began in 1941. Thailand was invaded by Japanese forces on 8 December 1941, as Japan sought to use Thai territory as a transit route to Burma and Malaya. At the time, elements of the Japanese military were stationed in Takhli District, Nakhon Sawan Province. During this period, the 4th Squadron launched aircraft to engage Japanese invading forces. As a result of these combat operations, Flight Lieutenant Chai Sunthornsingh, Flight Lieutenant Chin Chiramanimai, and Flying Officer Sanit Phothiwechakun were killed in action while taking off to engage the enemy.

After the Thai government permitted Japanese forces to move through the country, Japanese combat squadrons requested permission to use the airfield of the 2nd Squadron in Lopburi as an operational base. The Royal Thai Air Force declined this request but provided assistance by allocating land for the construction of a new airfield. Air Chief Marshal Fuen Ronnaphagrad Ritthakhanee, Chief of Staff of the Air Force, ordered Flight Lieutenant Chan Chulachat, a pilot of Flight 2, 1st Squadron, 2nd Wing Squadron, Lopburi, to lead a joint survey team with Japanese forces. Two potential sites were surveyed: Nong Pling Airfield and Takhli Airfield in Nakhon Sawan Province.

In 1943, the 4th Squadron was reinforced with an additional squadron equipped with Curtiss Hawk 75N (F-11). At the same time, the joint Thai–Japanese survey team determined that the Takhli area—characterized by low population density and favorable terrain—was the most suitable location. It was therefore agreed to construct Takhli Airfield, with funding jointly provided by Thailand and Japan.

Construction of Takhli Airfield began on 12 November 1943, following Japanese designs. Facilities included two runways, a control tower, aircraft parking aprons, taxiways, maintenance hangars, ammunition and supply depots, fuel storage facilities, and warehouses for equipment and tools.

After the end of the Second World War, Japan was defeated, and ownership of Takhli Airfield reverted to Thailand. The airfield came under the control of the Royal Thai Air Force.

=== Relocation to Takhli Airfield ===
In February 1949, the Royal Thai Air Force determined that Takhli Airfield was strategically suitable due to its central location within the country, its effectiveness for air power deployment, depth defense capability, and convenient transportation routes. As a result, Flight Lieutenant Prawong Paothong and Flight Lieutenant Chuen Thaweesang were assigned to survey the airfield, which had been transferred from Japanese control, and to restore it to operational condition.

In 1951, the 4th Squadron inducted Spitfire (F-14) aircraft into service, forming one fighter squadron. The unit subsequently began relocating from its former base at Khok Kathiam Subdistrict, Mueang Lopburi District, Lopburi Province, to Takhli District, Nakhon Sawan Province. The relocation was completed on 1 February 1953. At that time, the 4th Squadron operated a single unit, the 43rd Fighter Squadron. This date is therefore recognized as the establishment date of the present-day 403rd Squadron. In 1954, the unit further inducted F8F Bearcat (F-15) aircraft into the 43rd Squadron.

On 27 September 1955, King Bhumibol and Queen Sirikit visited the 4th Squadron by royal aircraft to observe its operations, marking a significant royal visit to the unit.

On 2 October 1961, the 4th Squadron received one F-84G Thunderjet (F-16) transferred from the 1st Air Wing Squadron, 11th Squadron (Don Muang) and assigned it to the 43rd Squadron. Subsequently, on 24 January 1963, eight F-86 Sabre (F-17) aircraft were inducted into the 43rd Squadron.

On 10 December 1963, the Royal Thai Air Force officially redesignated the unit from the 4th Air Wing Squadron to Wing 4, a designation that remains in use today. This date is recognized as the official establishment day of Wing 4.

=== Vietnam War and Anti-Communist Operations ===
Thailand participated in the Vietnam War alongside the United States beginning in 1959, primarily by providing basing and logistical support. The United States military designated Takhli Air Base as one of its major operational bases in Thailand. The United States Air Force (USAF) began deploying forces to Takhli in 1964, stationing the 355th Tactical Fighter Wing, which operated F-100, F-105, and F-4 aircraft. USAF forces withdrew from Takhli in 1973, but returned in 1974 with the 366th Tactical Fighter Wing, operating F-4 and F-111 aircraft. Following the end of the Vietnam War, all USAF forces were fully withdrawn from Takhli.

Between 18 and 30 April 1964, Takhli Air Base served as the venue for a joint military exercise codenamed Air Boonchu. Thai forces, together with allied nations, conducted defensive operations during the exercise. King Bhumibol Adulyadej and Crown Prince Maha Vajiralongkorn graciously visited the participating military units at Takhli Air Base during the exercise.

Following the outbreak of armed conflict on 7 August 1965, Wing 4 deployed forces from the 43rd Squadron in accordance with Royal Thai Air Force Operational Plan No. 1/08. From Takhli Air Base, air power was employed in support of counter-insurgency operations against communist insurgents. These operations continued until the conclusion of anti-communist campaigns in 1983.

On 17 February 1965, Princess Mother Srinagarindra visited Wing 4, during which she presented a bronze Buddha statue with a lap width of 5 inches, bestowed a royal portrait, planted two golden shower trees (Cassia fistula) beside the Thep Nimit Vihara, and presented Maharat Sema medals to all personnel in attendance.

On 19 July 1972, Wing 4 received its first batch of A-37B Dragonfly (A-6) aircraft, totaling 17 aircraft, from the United States for service with the 43rd Squadron. The induction ceremony was presided over by Field Marshal Thanom Kittikachorn, then Prime Minister of Thailand, who performed the aircraft blessing ceremony.

In 1977, significant changes occurred within Wing 4. The 42nd Squadron inducted AC-47 Spooky (AC-2) aircraft, with a total of 14 aircraft entering service. In the same year, squadron designations within Wing 4 were reorganized, with 42nd Squadron and 43rd Squadron redesignated as 402nd Squadron and 403rd Squadron, respectively. Two years later, in 1979, 404th Squadron was transferred to operate alongside 402nd Squadron, and three IAI Arava (RC-7) aircraft were inducted into 404th Squadron.

=== F-5 era ===
Wing 4 inducted F-5E/F Tiger II (F-18B/C) single-seat and two-seat aircraft into service with the 403rd Squadron, forming one fighter squadron. The final aircraft of the batch was delivered on 16 August 1981, and the official induction ceremony was held on 26 August 1981. On that occasion, Air Chief Marshal Panieng Karntarat, Commander-in-Chief of the Royal Thai Air Force, flew the aircraft from Don Muang Air Base to Takhli Air Base, Wing 4.

In 1982, the A-37B Dragonfly (A-6) squadron was ordered to relocate from Wing 4 to Wing 21, 211th Squadron, in Ubon Ratchathani Province. Subsequently, the Royal Thai Air Force adopted the concept of employing small remotely controlled aircraft to reduce pilot risk in combat operations, particularly in response to increasingly capable and accurate enemy air defense systems. As a result, Remotely Piloted Vehicles (RPVs) manufactured by Developmental Sciences Incorporated (United States) were procured. A total of five RPVs entered service with the 404th Squadron, Wing 4, on 17 December 1982. These aircraft operated for eight years before being withdrawn from service due to spare parts shortages. In the same year, Wing 4 inducted GAF Nomad (AC-9) aircraft into service with the 402nd Squadron, forming one squadron.

On 1 September 1984, Wing 4 relocated the 402nd Squadron, along with its personnel and families, to 461st Squadron, Wing 46, Phitsanulok, together with AC-47 Spooky (AC-2) and GAF Nomad (AC-9) aircraft. The relocation was conducted in stages, with Wing 4 buses transporting 10–15 families per trip.

Between 20 and 24 July 1992, RFB Fantrainer (T-18/T-18A) aircraft were transferred from the Flying Training School at Kamphaeng Saen Air Base and inducted into service with the 402nd Squadron, Wing 4. Subsequently, on 26 November 1992, Wing 4 transferred IAI ARAVA (RC-7) aircraft from the 404th Squadron to Wing 6, 605th Squadron, in accordance with air force force-structure adjustment policies.

Wing 4 established the 401st Squadron in preparation for the induction of Aero L-39 Albatros (TF-1) aircraft, which entered service on 15 December 1993, concurrently with 101st Squadron and 102nd Squadron at Wing 1, Nakhon Ratchasima. In 1994, the Royal Thai Air Force received and inducted a total of 36 L-39 Albatros aircraft, with the final batch delivered on 2 December 1994. These aircraft were distributed among 101st Squadron, 102nd Squadron (Wing 1), and 401st Squadron (Wing 4). The mission of the 401st Squadron included air attack, search, and combat search and rescue. The squadron was later relocated to Wing 41, Chiang Mai, and 101st Squadron was assigned to replace it at Wing 4 beginning on 1 April 2004.

On 14 March 1994, Wing 4 received SF-260 (T-15) aircraft transferred from 604th Squadron, with seven aircraft assigned to the 402nd Squadron to replace the Fantrainer aircraft approaching retirement. On 1 April 1994, F-5E/F aircraft were transferred from the 403rd Squadron to 211th Squadron.

=== F-16 era ===
On 7 November 1995, Wing 4 inducted F-16A/B (F-19A) aircraft into service with the 403rd Squadron.

On 26 September 1999, Wing 4 received several aircraft transferred from the 605th Squadron, Wing 6, including Merlin IV-A (RC-6), IAI Arava (RC-7), and Learjet 35A (RC-12) aircraft, which were assigned to the 402nd Squadron. At the same time, the SF-260 (T-15) was retired from service.

In 2008, the Royal Thai Air Force renewed its requirement for unmanned aerial vehicles (UAVs) to support operations, in line with the development of a network-centric warfare capability. Research and development were conducted on prototype unmanned aircraft for intelligence, surveillance, reconnaissance (ISR), aerial patrol, observation, and target tracking missions. In 2011, Wing 4 inducted the Aerostar B (RQ-1) prototype into service with the 404th Squadron. This system was later upgraded to the Aerostar BP in 2015, followed by the induction of the RTAF U1 (MQ-1) in 2020.

On 1 December 2010, Wing 4 inducted the DA42 MPP (RT-20) into service with the 402nd ELINT Squadron. Subsequently, the upgraded DA42 M-NG (T-20A) entered service with the same squadron on 21 September 2020.

On 26 February 2018, Wing 4 inducted the P.180 Avanti II EVO (RC-20) into service with the 402nd ELINT Squadron. The aircraft was later transferred on 20 April 2019 to the 604th Civil Pilot Training Squadron, Wing 6, Don Muang. Following this transfer, Wing 4 inducted the T-50TH (TF-2) into service with the 401st Light Attack Squadron.

=== 2025 Thailand–Cambodia clash ===
On 24 July 2025, the Royal Thai Air Force ordered a deployment of six F-16 fighter jets, reportedly a mixed formation from Wing 4 and Wing 1, to conduct air operations against military targets in Cambodia during the Thailand–Cambodia clash. The jets carried out their first airstrike against the 8th and 9th Cambodian Combat Support Battalions.

Later, two F-16 fighter jets from Wing 4, stationed at Takli AFB, Nakhon Sawan, conducted further bombing missions, targeting the 42nd Cambodian Infantry Battalion (Forward Unit), located south of Prasat Ta Muen Thom.

== Organization ==
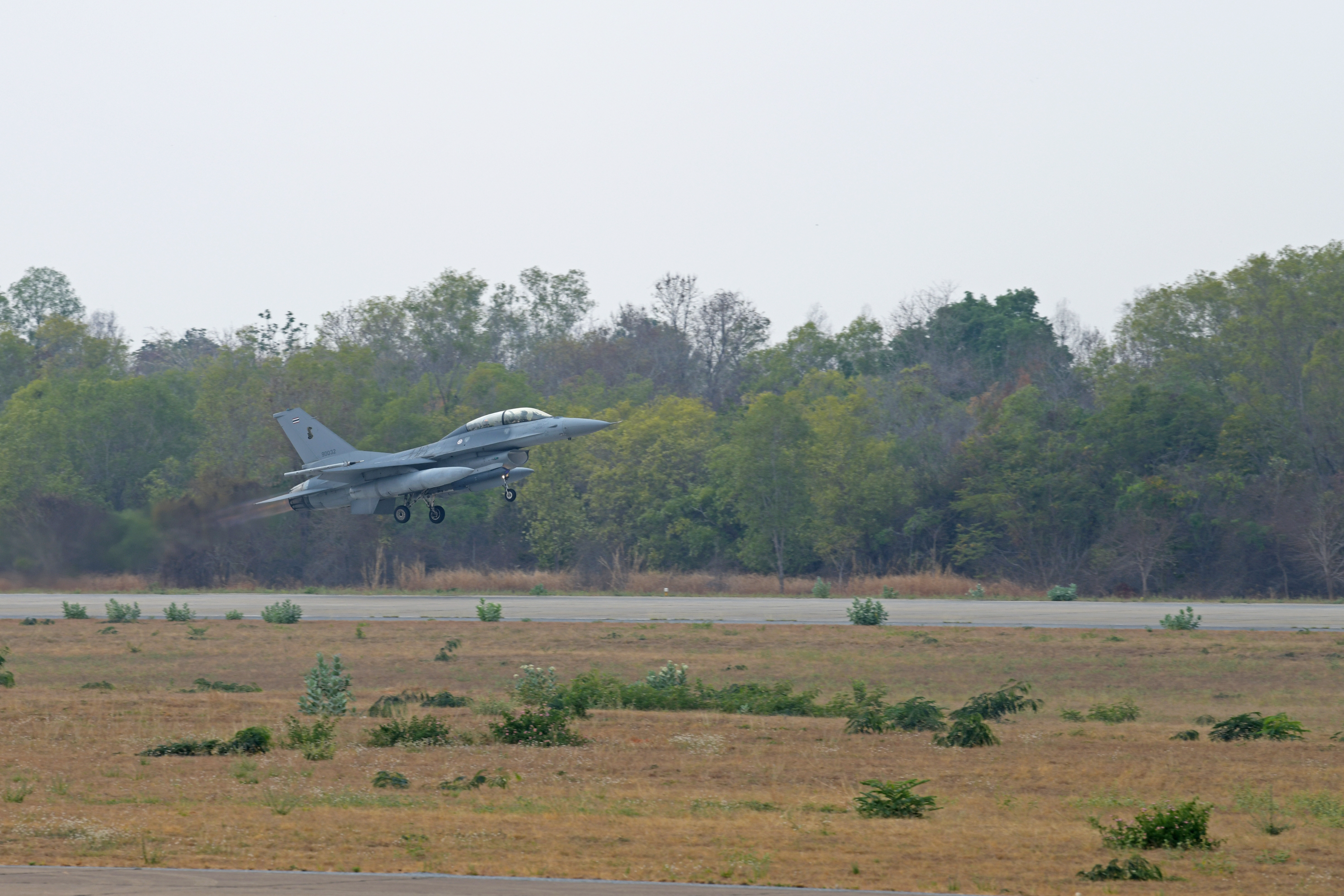
F-16 from the 403rd Fighter Squadron during a joint Cobra Gold 2020 exercise.

Wing 4 is structured into several administrative and operational units as follows:

=== Divisions ===
- Headquarters:
  - Personnel Division
  - Intelligence Division
  - Operations Division
  - Logistics Division
  - Civil Affairs Division
  - Information and Communication Technology Division
  - Administration Division
  - Procurement Section
- Technical Group:
  - Aircraft Maintenance Division
  - Communications Division
  - Armament Division
  - Fuel Services Section

=== Flying Squadrons ===
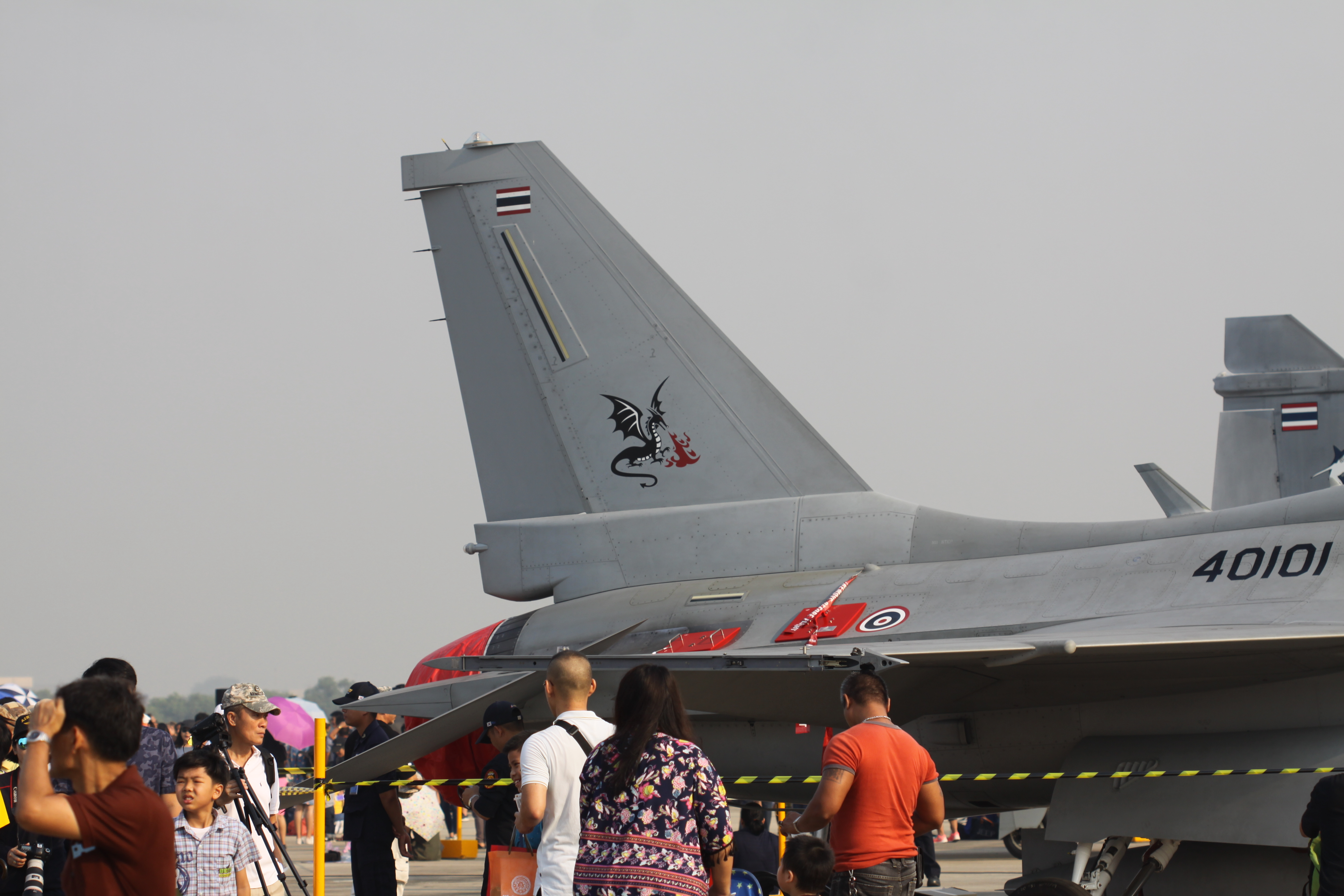
Vertical tail of a T-50TH with the dragon emblem, symbolizing the 401st Squadron and its radio callsign.

- 401st Light Attack Squadron "Dragon"
  - T-50TH: Fighter Trainer Aircraft Type 2 (TF-2)
- 402nd ELINT Reconnaissance Squadron "Focus"
  - DA42 MPP: Reconnaissance Trainer Aircraft Type 20 (RT-20)
  - DA42 M-NG: Trainer Aircraft Type 20A (T-20A)
- 403rd Fighter Squadron "Cobra"
  - F-16AM/BM Block 20 MLU: Fighter Aircraft Type 19/19A (F-19/F-19A)

=== Other Departments ===
- Finance Division
- Civil Engineering Division
- Welfare Division
- Flight Support Division
- Transport Division
- Quartermaster Division
- Central Supply Division

=== Other Units ===
- Wing Hospital
- RTAF Security Force Battalion
- Military Police Company

== Aircraft ==
Photo	Aircraft	Origin	Role	In service	Notes
401st Light Attack Squadron
	FA-50TH Block 10 T-50TH	South Korea	Light attack Lead-in fighter trainer	4 10	
402nd ELINT Reconnaissance Squadron
	DA42 MPP	Austria	Reconnaissance/Photograph	8	
	DA42 M-NG	Austria	Reconnaissance/Height measurement	3	Equipped with LiDAR
403rd Fighter Squadron
	F-16A Block 20 MLU F-16B Block 20 MLU	United States	Multirole fighter	12 6	

== Former Aircraft ==
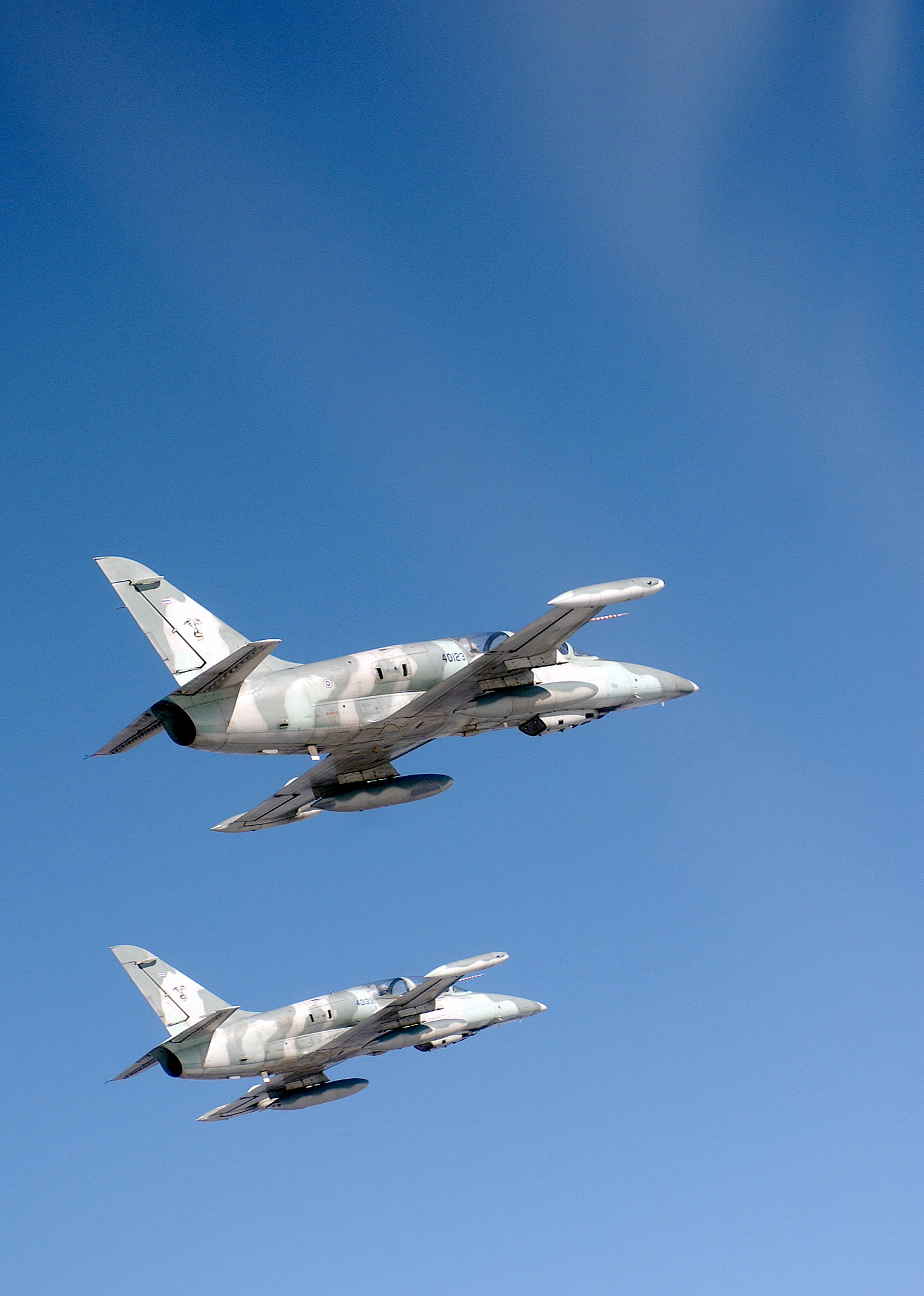
L-39 while in service with the 401st Squadron.

- Curtiss Hawk II (F-9)
- Curtiss Hawk III (F-10)
- Curtiss Hawk 75N (F-11)
- North American T-6 Texan (T-8)
- Supermarine Spitfire (F-14)
- Grumman F8F Bearcat (F-15)
- Republic F-84G Thunderjet (F-16)
- North American F-86 Sabre (F-17)
- Cessna A-37 Dragonfly (A-6)
- IAI Arava (RC-7)
- Northrop F-5E/F (F-18B/C)
- Remotely Piloted Vehicle
- Douglas AC-47 Spooky (AC-2)
- GAF Nomad (AC-9)
- RFB Fantrainer (T-18/18A)
- Learjet 35A (RC-12)
- PP.180 Avanti II EVO (RC-20)
- Aerostar B (RQ-1)
- Fairchild Merlin IV (RC-6)
- SIAI-Marchetti SF.260 (T-15)
- Aero L-39 Albatros (TF-1)

== Location ==
Wing 4 is based at Takhli Royal Thai Air Force Base, with all of its squadrons stationed at this base.

== Mission ==
Wing 4 is tasked with maintaining a high level of combat readiness, including the preparedness of personnel, weapons, and military equipment, as well as conducting air power operations. The scope of its missions is divided among its three subordinate squadrons as follows:

- 401st Light Attack Squadron: Conducts flight training and tactical fighter operations.
- 402nd ELINT Reconnaissance Squadron: Conducts aerial surveillance and reconnaissance missions, including medium-altitude patrols, capable of operating both day and night, with flexible mission profiles and the ability to integrate a variety of surveillance sensor systems.
- 403rd Fighter Squadron: Conducts fighter and strike missions, utilizing advanced avionics, weapon systems, and self-protection systems, with aircraft-to-aircraft data connectivity via the Link-16 data link system.
