= Royal Thai Air Force =

Aerial warfare branch of Thailand's military

- กองทัพอากาศไทย; Kong Thap Akat Thai
- Badge of the Royal Thai Air Force
- Founded: 2 November 1913; 112 years ago
- Country: Thailand
- Type: Air force
- Role: Aerial warfare Anti-aircraft warfare
- Size: 46,000 active personnel 674 Aircraft
- Part of: Royal Thai Armed Forces And Royal Thai Armed Forces Headquarters
- Headquarters: Don Muang Air Base, Bangkok
- Nicknames: "ทอ." "Thor Or" Abbreviation of Air Force "ทัพฟ้า" "Thap Fah" Sky Army
- Mottos: น่านฟ้าไทย จะมิให้ใครมาย่ำยี "The Thai airspace, none shall ever invade"
- Colours: Blue
- March: Thai: มาร์ชกองทัพอากาศ "Royal Thai Air Force March"
- Anniversaries: 9 April 1937 (Royal Thai Air Force Day)
- Engagements: World War I; European theatre; Western Front; Hundred Days Offensive; Meuse–Argonne offensive; Interwar period; Boworadet Rebellion; World War II; Franco-Thai War; Pacific War; Japanese invasion of Thailand; Battle of Prachuap Khiri Khan; Malayan campaign; Burma campaign; Japanese invasion of Burma; Burma campaign (1942–1943); Battle of Northern Burma and Western Yunnan; Burma campaign (1944); Burma campaign (1944–1945); South-East Asian Theatre; Bombing of Bangkok; Cold War; Cold War in Asia; Decolonisation of Asia; Korean War; Malayan Emergency; Indochina Wars; Vietnam War; Laotian Civil War; Cambodian Civil War; Communist insurgency in Thailand; Communist insurgency in Malaysia; Third Indochina War; Cambodian conflict (1979–1998); Cambodian–Vietnamese War; Vietnamese border raids in Thailand; Thai–Laotian Border War; Persian Gulf War; 1999 East Timorese crisis; International Force East Timor; War on drugs; Internal conflict in Myanmar; Operation Border Post 9631; 2010–2012 Myanmar border clashes; Global war on terrorism; Operation Enduring Freedom; Iraq War; OEF – Afghanistan; OEF – Horn of Africa; 2003 Phnom Penh riots; Operation Pochentong; Southern Insurgency; United Nations peacekeeping; UNIKOM; ONUB; UNTAET; UNAMID; UNAMA; UNMIS; FCU UNTAC; Battle of Marawi; 2023 Sudan conflict; Battle of Khartoum (2023); Evacuation from Sudan (2023); Cambodia–Thailand border dispute; 2008–2013 Cambodian–Thai border crisis; 2025 Cambodian–Thai conflict
- Battle honours: Battle of Prachuap Khiri Khan
- Website: rtaf.mi.th

Commanders
- Commander-in-Chief: Air Chief Marshal Seksan Kantha

Insignia
- Roundel

- Fin flash

- Flag

Aircraft flown
- Attack: Alpha Jet A/TH, AT-6TH
- Electronic warfare: Saab 340 AEW&C
- Fighter: JAS 39C/D, F-16A/B/AM/BM, F-5E/F/TH
- Helicopter: S-70i, Bell 412, S-92, EC725
- Reconnaissance: AU-23A, DA42 MPP, P.180 Avanti
- Trainer: T-41D, DA40, DA42, RTAF-6, T-6TH, T-50TH, EC135
- Transport: C-130H/H-30, BT-67, Saab 340B, ATR-72, Boeing 737, A319, A320, A340, SSJ-100-95LR

The Royal Thai Air Force (RTAF) (Thai: กองทัพอากาศไทย; RTGS: Kong Thap Akat Thai) is the air force of Thailand. Since its establishment in 1913 as one of the earliest air forces of Asia, the Royal Thai Air Force has engaged in numerous major and minor conflicts. During the Vietnam War era, the RTAF was supplied with USAF-aid equipment.

== History ==
Belgian pilot Charles Van Den Born performed a flying demonstration over Bangkok in January 1911, greatly impressing Prince Chakrabongse Bhuvanath, brother of King Vajiravudh, and he even accepted an invitation for a flight. Chakrabongse sent three army officers to France, who began flight training at Vélizy-Villacoublay in July 1912. The officers became qualified aviators a year later. Soon after, Sra Pathum airfield was established along with a temporary hangar to house planes and also host flight training. In late 1913, the three new aviators returned home after arranging for the purchase of four Nieuport monoplanes and a Bréguet biplane. The aviation section put on a demonstration in January 1914, gaining the support of the King and a permanent aviation group was established and an air base at Don Muang was assigned, as the Royal Aeronautical Service, under Army control.

Siam entered World War I with the Allies in July 1917, and a Siamese Expeditionary Force of around 1,200 men was sent to France, arriving in June 1918. Among them were 370 pilots and groundcrew, including more than 100 officers who were sent to flight school first at Istres and Avord, and then at Istres, Le Crotoy, La Chapelle-la-Reine, Biscarosse and Piox. Eventually, The 95 pilots who qualified as military aviators flew a few operational sorties in the closing weeks of the war but suffered no casualties, nor scored any kills. Their training did mean that Siam entered the post-World War I period with one of the best equipped and trained air forces in Asia.

In the 1930s the Royal Aeronautical Service began to replace French aircraft with American designs, purchasing more than 95 aircraft, including the Boeing P-12E, Curtiss Hawks, and Vought Corsairs. The air force was formally separated into its own branch, the Royal Siamese Air Force, in April 1937 and five operational wings were established. In 1939, when Siam became Thailand, the service was renamed the Royal Thai Air Force. At the end of 1940, the RTAF once again saw combat, this time in the Franco-Thai War, a border conflict against French Indochina. The RTAF operated in the Mekong Delta, attacking ground forces and gunboats and defending against French bombing raids, until a ceasefire was arranged in January 1941. Later that year, on 7 December, Thailand was invaded by Japan. The RTAF took an active role in the resistance. Combat Wings 1 and 5 engaged significantly more advanced Japanese aircraft over Thailand's eastern border, but suffered heavy losses, including almost 30 percent of Wing 5, before a cease-fire took effect the following day.

== Structure ==
The Air Force is commanded by the Commander of the Royal Thai Air Force (ผู้บัญชาการทหารอากาศไทย). The Royal Thai Air Force Headquarters is located in Don Muang Airbase, Bangkok, Thailand.

The RTAF consists of headquarters and five groups: command, combat, support, education and training, and special services.

=== Headquarters Group ===
- Royal Flight Aircraft Administrative Center
- Royal Flight Helicopter Administrative Center
- Air Warfare Center
- Office of Public Sector Development, RTAF
- Office of Intellectual Development, RTAF

=== Command Group ===
- RTAF Secretariat
- Directorate of Administrative Service
- Directorate of Personnel
- Directorate of Intelligence
- Directorate of Operations
- Directorate of Logistics
- Directorate of Civil Affairs
- Directorate of Information and Communications Technology
- Office of the RTAF Comptroller
- Directorate of Finance
- Directorate of Inspector General
- Office of RTAF Internal Audit
- Office of RTAF Safety
- Office of RTAF Judge Advocate

=== Combat Group ===
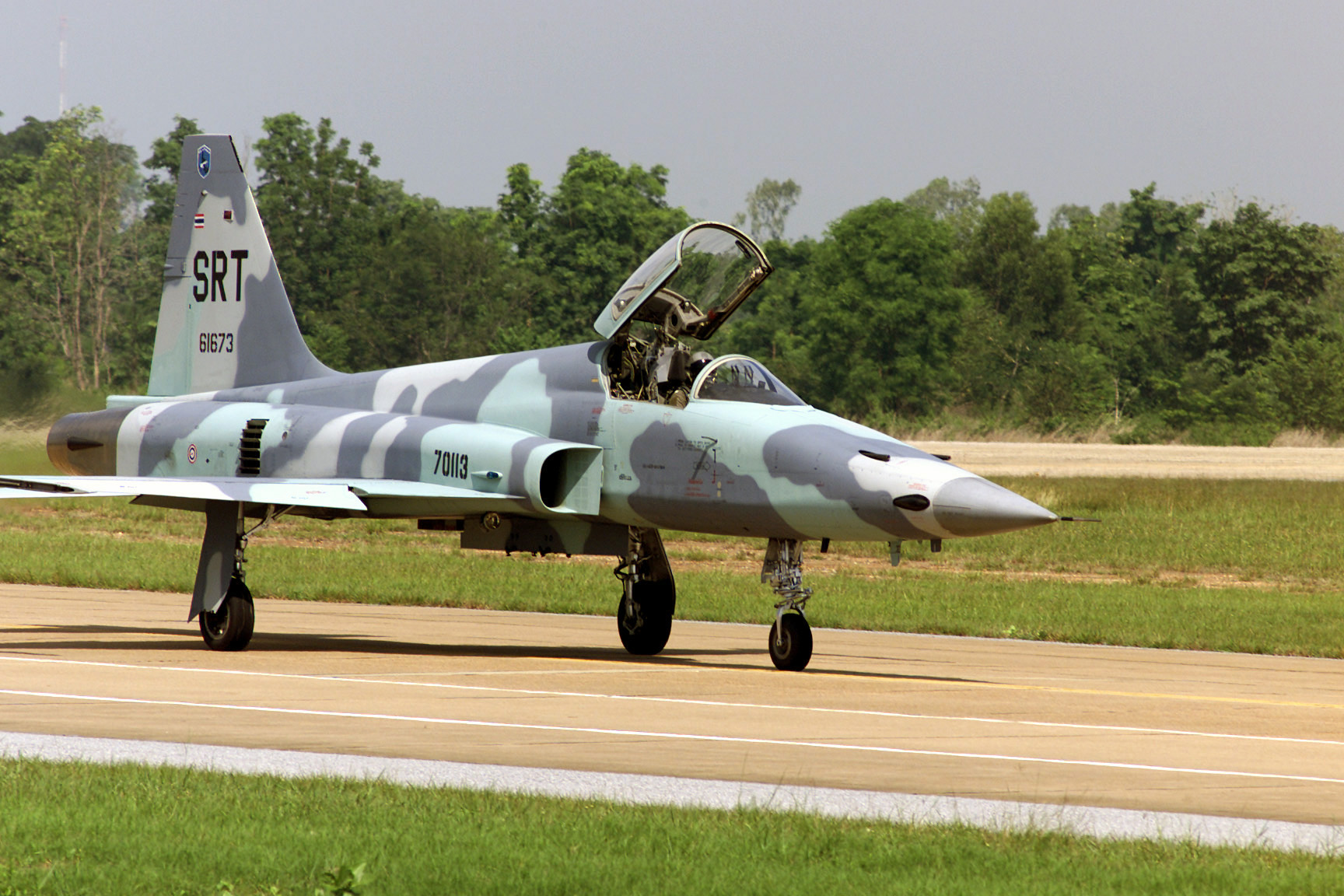
An F-5E with the 904 Aggressor Squadron

The Royal Thai Air Force Combat Group is divided into 11 combat wings, 1 forward operating base wing, plus a flight training school and a few direct-reporting units.

Wing	Role	Province	Base	Notes
Directorate of Air Operations Control				
Security Force Command				
Space Operation Center				
Royal Thai Air Force Academy	Training	Saraburi	Muak Lek	
Flying Training School	Training	Nakhon Pathom	Kamphang Saen	Composed of 1st, 2nd and 3rd Flying Training Squadrons
Wing 1	Interceptor/fighter	Nakhon Ratchasima	Korat	
Wing 2	Helicopter transport/SAR	Lopburi	Khok Kathiam	
Wing 3	Unmanned aerial vehicle	Sa Kaeo	Watthana Nakhon	
Wing 4	Light attack/interceptor	Nakhon Sawan	Takhli	
Wing 5	Transport/special mission	Prachuap Khiri Khan	Prachuap Khiri Khan	
Wing 6	Non-combat multi-role	Bangkok	Don Muang	Provides transport, mapping, communications, surveying
Wing 7	Interceptor/fighter	Surat Thani	Surat Thani	Nicknamed "Ferocious Shark of the Andaman" and "House of Gripen" as they fly Gripen aircraft.
Wing 21	Interceptor	Ubon Ratchathani	Ubon Ratchathani	
Wing 23	Attack	Udon Thani	Udon	
Wing 41	Light attack	Chiang Mai	Chiang Mai	
Wing 46	Transport/rainmaking	Phitsanulok	Phitsanulok	
Wing 56	Forward operating base	Songkhla	Hat Yai	

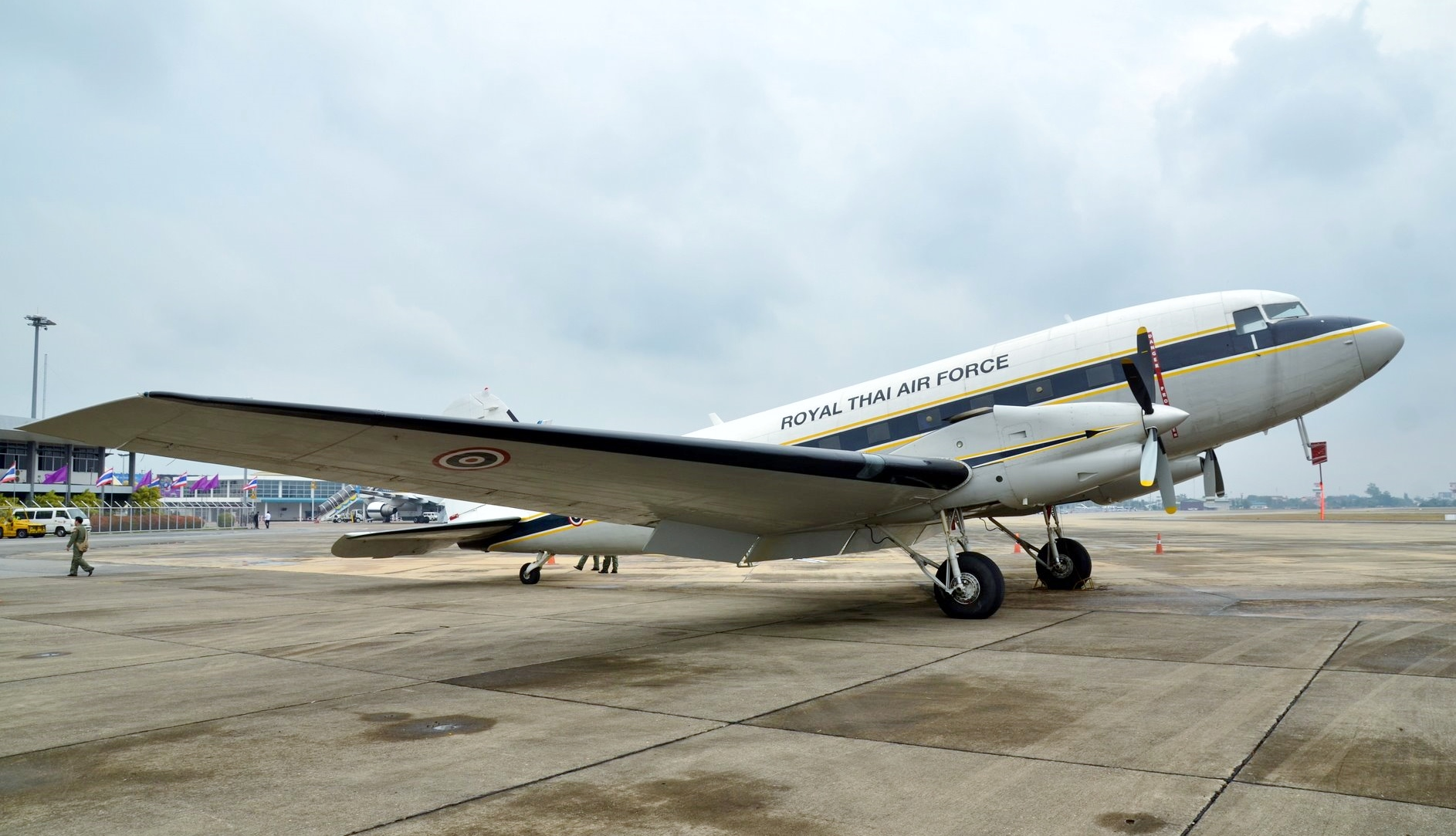
A Basler BT-67 cargo airlifter

==== Squadrons ====
The following squadrons are currently active with the Royal Thai Air Force.

Squadron	Equipment	Wing	RTAF Base	Notes
101^{st} Fighter Squadron	-	Wing 1	Korat	
102^{nd} Fighter Squadron	F16A/B Block 15 ADF	Wing 1	Korat	
103^{rd} Fighter Squadron	F-16A/B Block 15 OCU	Wing 1	Korat	
201 Helicopter Squadron	S-70i, S-92	Wing 2	Khok Ka Thiam	Former Royal Guard
202 Helicopter Squadron	Bell 412/SP/HP/EP	Wing 2	Khok Ka Thiam	
203 Helicopter Squadron	EC 725	Wing 2	Khok Ka Thiam	SAR detachments at many locations. UH-1H replaced by EC 725
301 UAV Squadron	Aerostar BP, RTAF U-1	Wing 3	Watthana Nakhon	
302 UAV Squadron	Aerostar BP, RTAF U-1	Wing 3	Watthana Nakhon	
303 UAV Squadron	Aerostar BP, RTAF U-1	Wing 3	Watthana Nakhon	
401 Light Attack Squadron	T-50TH	Wing 4	Takhli	
402 Elint Reconnaissance Squadron	P.180 Avanti	Wing 4	Takhli	
403 Fighter Squadron	F-16AM/BM Block 20 MLU	Wing 4	Takhli	
501 Light Attack Squadron	Fairchild AU-23	Wing 5	Prachuap Khiri Khan	
601 Transport Squadron	C-130H/H-30	Wing 6	Don Muang	
602 Royal Flight Squadron	A319CJ, A320CJ, A340-500	Wing 6	Don Muang	Former Royal Guard
603 Transport Squadron	ATR72-600, SSJ100-95LR	Wing 6	Don Muang	
604 Civil Pilot Training Squadron	PAC CT-4A, T-41D, Diamond DA42	Wing 6	Don Muang	
Dechochai 3 Royal Flight Unit	B737-400, B737-800	Royal Security Command	Don Muang	Royal Flight Unit
701 Fighter Squadron	JAS-39 C/D	Wing 7	Surat Thani	Total 12 Gripens delivered (4 Gripen D and 8 Gripen C), replacing F-5E/F.
702 Air Control Squadron	Saab 340, S-100B Argus	Wing 7	Surat Thani	Saab 340 70201 and S-100B Argus AEW 70202
211 Fighter Squadron	F-5TH Super Tigris	Wing 21	Ubon	
231 Attack Squadron	Alpha Jet A	Wing 23	Udorn	
411 Fighter Squadron	AT-6TH	Wing 41	Chiang Mai	
461 Transport Squadron	Basler BT-67	Wing 46	Phitsanulok	Also conducts rainmaking flights.
561 Fighter Squadron	-	Wing 56	Hat Yai	Forward operating base for 701 Fighter Sqn.
904 Aggressor Squadron	F-5E	Dechochai 3 Royal Flight Unit, Royal Security Command	Don Muang	Former unit of King Vajiralongkorn Mahidol. Under Dechochai 3 Royal Flight Unit, Royal Security Command
1^{st} Flying Training Squadron	PAC CT/4E	Flying Training School	Kamphang Saen	Primary flight training.
2^{nd} Flying Training Squadron	Pilatus PC-9M	Flying Training School	Kamphang Saen	Basic flight training.
3^{rd} Flying Training Squadron	Eurocopter EC135T3H	Flying Training School	Kamphang Saen	Helicopter training.

Air bases of the Royal Thai Air Force

=== Support Group ===
- Directorate of Aeronautical Engineering
- Directorate of Communications and Electronics
- Directorate of Armament
- Directorate of Quartermaster
- Directorate of Civil Engineering
- Directorate of Transportation
- RTAF Software Center

=== Directorate of Medical Services ===
First set up in 1913 in the same year as the Air Force, providing nursing services only, and over the years has gradually expanded. It operates Bhumibol Adulyadej Hospital and Royal Thai Air Force Hospital in Bangkok, as well as smaller hospitals at each wing. The directorate has made a teaching agreement with the Faculty of Medicine, Chulalongkorn University to train students at Bhumibol Adulyadej Hospital, accepting about 30 students per academic year.

=== RTAF Software Center ===
The Chief of the Air Force has envisioned and identified weaknesses in procurement software, which include limitations regarding copyright usage, maintenance, envisioning obstacles, and expanding usage to cover and cater to the needs of the Air Force. Consequently, there has been an initiation to ethically software development, independently, for the first time. This encompasses care from artificial intelligence systems, Big Data, Avionics software, strategic planning software, and support technology for the future, leading to the ISO 29110 software development standard. This initiative has also propelled the consideration to establish a comprehensive software-focused unit within the Air Force.

=== Education and Training Group ===
- Directorate of Education and Training
- Air War College
- Air Command and Staff College
- Senior Air Officer School
- Squadron Officer School
- Officer Training School
- Academy Instructor School
- Non-Commissioned Officer School
- Air Technical Training School
- RTAF Language Center
- Personal Testing Center
- Technical Service Division
- Chaplain Division
- Navaminda Kasatriyadhiraj Royal Thai Air Force Academy

=== Special Service Group ===
- Research and Development Center for Space and Aeronautical Science and Technology
- Directorate of Welfare
- Office of Don Mueang RTAF Base Commander
- Institute of Aviation Medicine

=== Security Force Command ===
The RTAF Security Force Command (Thai: หน่วยบัญชาการอากาศโยธิน) is a Division size unit in the Royal Thai Air Force. It has been in existence since 1937. They are based near Don Mueang International Airport. The RTAF Security Force Command is the main air force ground forces and special forces which providing light infantry for anti-hijacking capabilities, protecting air bases and high value assets, protecting international airport in insurgent areas. It also serves as the Royal Thai Air Force Special Operations Regiment (RTAF SOR) which consists of various units such as Combat Control Team (CCT), Pararescue Jumpers (PJs), Tactical Air Control Party (TACP). Royal Thai Air Force Security Force Command consist of 3 main regiments and multiple support units. Additionally, one separated air base protection battalions and one separated anti-aircraft battalions are station in each air bases.

== Royal Thai Air Force bases ==
The Royal Thai Air Force maintains a number of modern bases which were constructed between 1954 and 1968, have permanent buildings and ground support equipment.

All but one were built and used by United States forces until their withdrawal from Thailand in 1976 when the RTAF took over the installations at Takhli and Nakhon Ratchasima (Korat). In the late 1980s, these bases and Don Muang Air Base outside Bangkok, which the air force shares with civil aviation, remain the primary operational installations.

Maintenance of base facilities abandoned by the United States (Ubon, Udorn) proved costly and exceeded Thai needs; they were turned over to the Department of Civil Aviation for civil use. Nonetheless, all runways were still available for training and emergency use.

By 2004 the Royal Thai Air Force had its main base at Don Muang airport, adjacent to Don Mueang International Airport. The RTAF also had large air fields and facilities at Nakon Ratchasima Ubon Ratchathani, and Takhli.

== Budget ==
RTAF budgets are shown below by fiscal year (FY):

FY	Million (baht)	% GDP
2018	39,931	0.243%
2019	41,609	0.237%
2020	42,539	0.240%
2021	40,081	

== Rank structure ==
=== Officers ===
Rank group	General/flag officers				Senior officers			Junior officers
Royal Thai Air Force
Royal Thai Air Force	จอมพลอากาศ; Chom phon akat	พลอากาศเอก; Phon akat ek	พลอากาศโท; Phon akat tho	พลอากาศตรี Phon akat tri	นาวาอากาศเอก; Nawa akat ek	นาวาอากาศโท; Nawa akat tho	นาวาอากาศตรี Nawa akat tri	เรืออากาศเอก; Ruea akat ek	เรืออากาศโท; Ruea akat tho	เรืออากาศตรี Ruea akat tri

=== Other ranks ===
Rank group	Senior NCOs				Junior NCOs		Enlisted
Royal Thai Air Force							No insignia
Royal Thai Air Force	พันจ่าอากาศเอก; Phan cha akat ek	พันจ่าอากาศโท; Phan cha akat tho	พันจ่าอากาศตรี Phan cha akat tri	จ่าอากาศเอก; Cha akat ek	จ่าอากาศโท; Cha akat tho	จ่าอากาศตรี Cha akat tri	พลทหาร; Phon thahan

== Aircraft insignia ==
=== Roundels ===
1919 — 1940 1945 — present	1940 — 1941	1941 — 1945

=== Tail markings ===
1919 — 1941 1945 — present	1941 — 1945

== Sports ==
=== Brazilian jiu-jitsu ===
The Siam Cup BJJ (Brazilian jiu-jitsu) International tournament was held at the Show DC stadium in Bangkok from 2017 in cooperation with the Arete BJJ dōjō, hosted by the Royal Thai Air Force. Each year, the tournament brings together more than 400 fighters from more than 50 countries to compete. The Siam Cup BJJ 2021 was scheduled to take place on May 8, but due to restrictions imposed for COVID-19 during the coronavirus pandemic, the Thai government temporarily postponed all sporting events.

== See also ==
- Royal Thai Air Force Museum
- Royal Thai Armed Forces Headquarters
- Military of Thailand
- Royal Thai Army
- Royal Thai Navy
- Royal Thai Police
- Napa-1
