= Wing 1 Nakhon Ratchasima =

Wing 1
- กองบิน 1
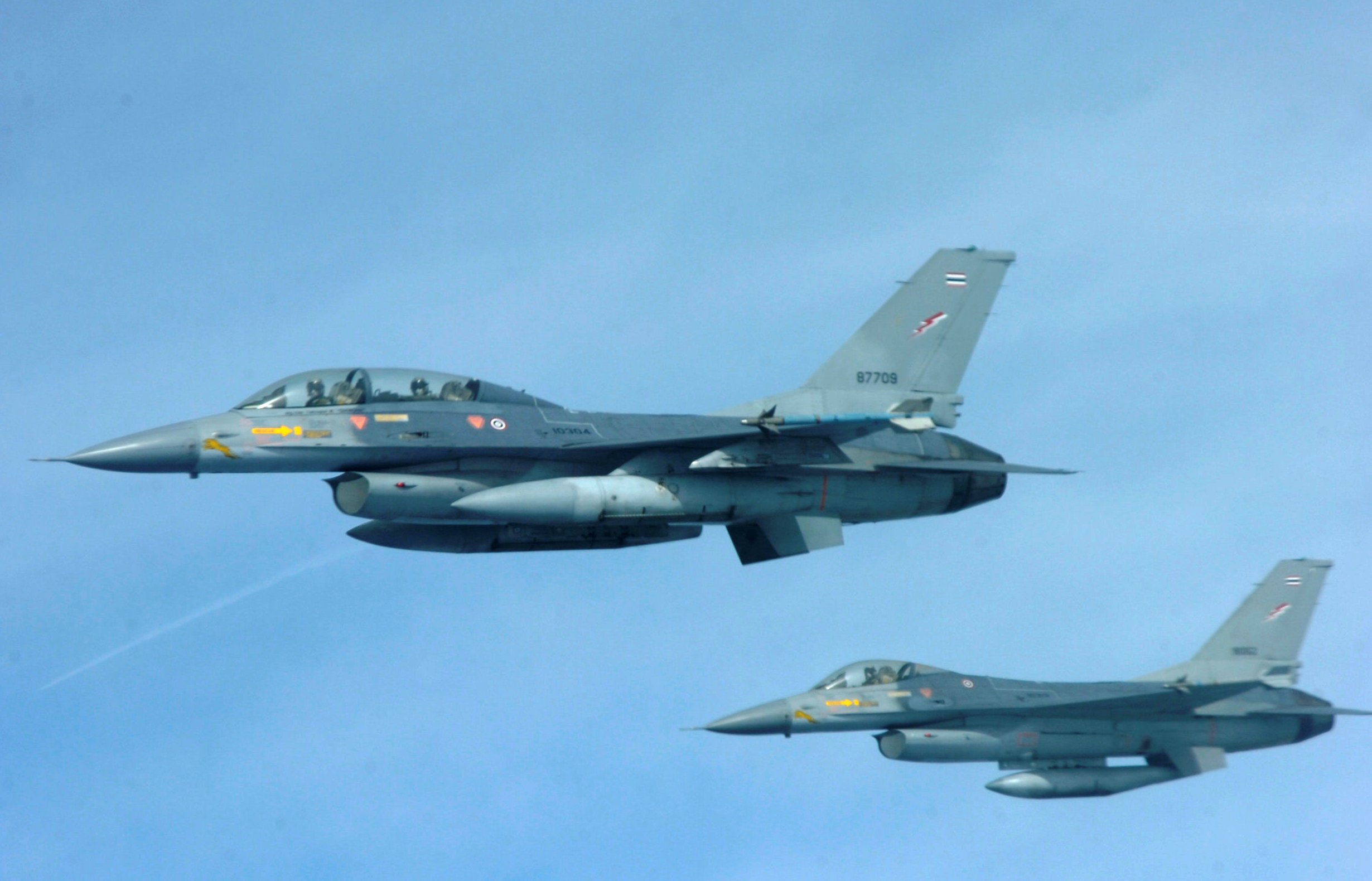
- Two F-16B Block 15 OCU from the 103rd Fighter Squadron
- Active: 1st Army Aviation Wing (1918–1921); 1st Flying Training Wing (1921–1936); 1st Wing Squadron (1936–1963); Wing 1 (1963–present)
- Country: Thailand
- Branch: Royal Thai Air Force
- Type: Fighter wing
- Role: Fighter: tactical interceptor
- Part of: Combat Group, Royal Thai Air Force
- Garrison/HQ: Korat AFB, Nakhon Ratchasima
- Mascot: Tiger
- Anniversaries: April 15, 1936; 90 years ago
- Engagements: World War II; Franco-Thai War; Pacific War; Burma campaign; Bombing of Bangkok; Manhattan Rebellion; Cold War; Malayan Emergency; Indochina wars; Cambodian–Vietnamese War; Communist insurgency in Thailand; Vietnamese border raids in Thailand; Thai–Laotian Border War; 2003 Phnom Penh riots; Operation Pochentong 1; Cambodia–Thailand border dispute; 2025 Cambodia–Thailand conflict
- Decorations: Green Silk Ribbon of Honor
- Website: wing1.rtaf.mi.th

Commanders
- Current commander: Group Captain Kritsana Piamsri

Insignia
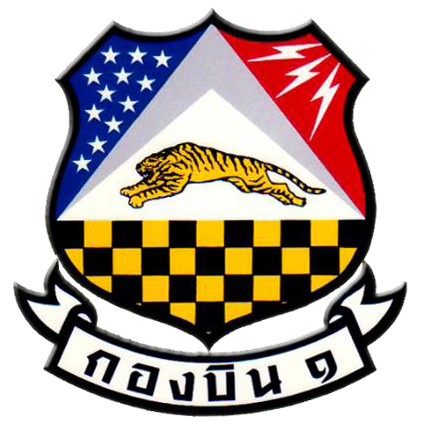
- Wing 1 emblem

Wing 1 (Thai: กองบิน 1; RTGS: Kong Bin 1) is a tactical interceptor fighter wing under the Combat Group and is a directly subordinate unit of the Royal Thai Air Force. It is stationed at Korat AFB, Nakhon Ratchasima. The unit was established on 15 April 1936.

== History ==
Wing 1 traces its origins to the establishment of the 1st Army Aviation Wing in 1918, under the command of the Army Aviation Department. At that time, it operated Nieuport 17 & 21 and SPAD VII & XIII aircraft and was stationed on the western side of Don Muang AFB. In 1921, the unit was renamed the 1st Flying School Wing. Later, by Royal Decree dated 15 April 1936, it was renamed the 1st Wing Squadron. This date is now observed as the official founding date of Wing 1. At that time, the unit operated four types of aircraft: Avro 504N (T-4), Nieuport-Delage (F-4), Curtiss Hawk II (F-9), and Curtiss Hawk III (F-10).

=== Franco-Thai War ===
During the Franco-Thai War in 1940, the 1st Wing Squadron was reorganized, with its squadrons deployed independently to conduct operations in northeastern Thailand. The unit performed its missions with notable bravery and received commendations. As a result, it was awarded the honorary decoration known as the “Green Silk Ribbon of Honor.”

=== World War II ===
Subsequently, the squadron participated in combined operations with larger wings during the Pacific War. One of its most notable feats was an engagement in which five aircraft were dispatched to confront 21 enemy aircraft over Lampang Province.

On 11 November 1944, more than 21 Allied attack aircraft—consisting of P-51 Mustangs and P-38 Lightnings—conducted air operations and attacks against Lampang Airfield. The Northern Mixed Wing dispatched five Nakajima Ki-27 Ota fighter aircraft (F-12) to intercept them. The mission was led by Flight Lieutenant Chaloemkiat Wattanangkun, with Flight Sergeant Major Juladit Dechkunchorn, Flight Sergeant Major Wasan Suntharakomol, and Sergeant Thada Biaokhaimuk serving as pilots.

Thai forces succeeded in shooting down four Allied aircraft. However, all five Thai aircraft were also shot down. One pilot, Flight Sergeant Major Wasan Suntharakomol, was killed in action. The squadron leader, Flight Lieutenant Chaloemkiat Wattanangkun, was seriously wounded in the leg, with a bullet lodged in his body, and descended with his aircraft. He was rescued by local civilians before the aircraft exploded. Following this engagement, the Supreme Command requested royal permission to award bravery medals to all pilots and gunners involved in the incident.

=== Cold War ===
In 1948, the 1st Wing Squadron deployed three Mitsubishi Ki-30 aircraft (A-2) to Songkhla Airfield to suppress Chinese Communist insurgents.

The unit also took part in suppressing the Manhattan Rebellion by deploying aircraft from Squadrons 2 and 3, including Spitfires and T-6 aircraft. The rebellion was defeated on 29 June 1951.

In 1953, the Operations Wing assigned the 1st Wing Squadron to deploy forces from Squadron 3 with four Bearcat aircraft (F-15) to Phitsanulok AFB, and forces from Squadron 2 with five T-6 aircraft (T-8) to Phrae Airport. These deployments supported operations against Haw insurgents under the command of Task Force 9 in Lampang.

On 1 October 1963, the 1st Wing Squadron was officially redesignated as Wing 1.

In 1970, Wing 1 lost two F-5 aircraft along with two pilots—Flight Lieutenant Chanchai Mahakanjana and Flying Officer Phongsanarong Kasetsuk—during an attack mission against communist targets in the Khao Kho area, Phetchabun Province.

=== From Don Mueang to Korat ===
On 24 October 1976, Wing 1 relocated from Don Muang AFB to Korat AFB, located approximately 5 kilometers south of Mueang Nakhon Ratchasima district.

Wing 1, 102nd Fighter Squadron, later conducted air strike operations against artillery positions in the Ban Bo Lan area of Laos, employing Rockeye cluster bombs, four per aircraft, successfully destroying all designated targets in the area.

In 2001, clashes occurred along the Thai–Myanmar border. Wing 1, through 103rd Fighter Squadron, conducted aerial patrols along the border and deployed Flight 1032 to a forward operating base at Chiang Mai AFB to prepare for potential air operations.

During the 2003 Phnom Penh riots, the 103rd Fighter Squadron was ordered to prepare for the possible use of air power in the event of an emergency or escalation of violence, under Operation Plan Pochentong 2 .

== Organization ==
Wing 1 is administratively organized as follows:

=== Wing Headquarters ===
- Personnel Division
- Intelligence Division
- Logistics Division
- Operations Division
- Civil Affairs Division
- Administrative Division
- Information and Communications Technology Section
- Procurement Section

=== Operations Element ===
- 101st Fighter Squadron "Checker"
- 102nd Fighter Squadron "Stars"
  - F-16A/B Block 15 ADF: Fighter Aircraft Type 19/19A (F-19/F-19A)
  - Currently in the process of acquiring replacement aircraft; the Royal Thai Air Force has selected the JAS 39 Gripen E/F
- 103rd Fighter Squadron "Lightning"
  - F-16A/B Block 15 OCU: Fighter Aircraft Type 19/19A (F-19/F-19A)
- RTAF Security Force Battalion
- Flight Support Division
- Air Operations Control Division

=== Technical Group ===
- Aircraft Maintenance Division
- Communications and Electronics Division
- Armament Division
- Fuel Services Platoon

=== Directly Subordinate Units ===
- Flight Standards Office
- Budget Officer
- Finance Division
- Transportation Division
- Civil Engineering Division
- Quartermaster Division
- Welfare Division
- Wing Hospital
- Military Police Company
- Central Supply Division
- Flight Safety Office
- Ground Safety Office
- Chaplain
- Judge Advocate Officer

== Aircraft ==
Photo	Aircraft	Origin	Role	In service	Notes
102nd Fighter Squadron
	JAS 39E JAS 39F	Sweden	Multirole fighter	0(+3) 0(+1)	12 E/F on order.
103rd Fighter Squadron
	F-16A/B Block 15 ADF F-16A/B Block 15 OCU	United States	Multirole fighter	11/1 12/5	

== Former Aircraft ==
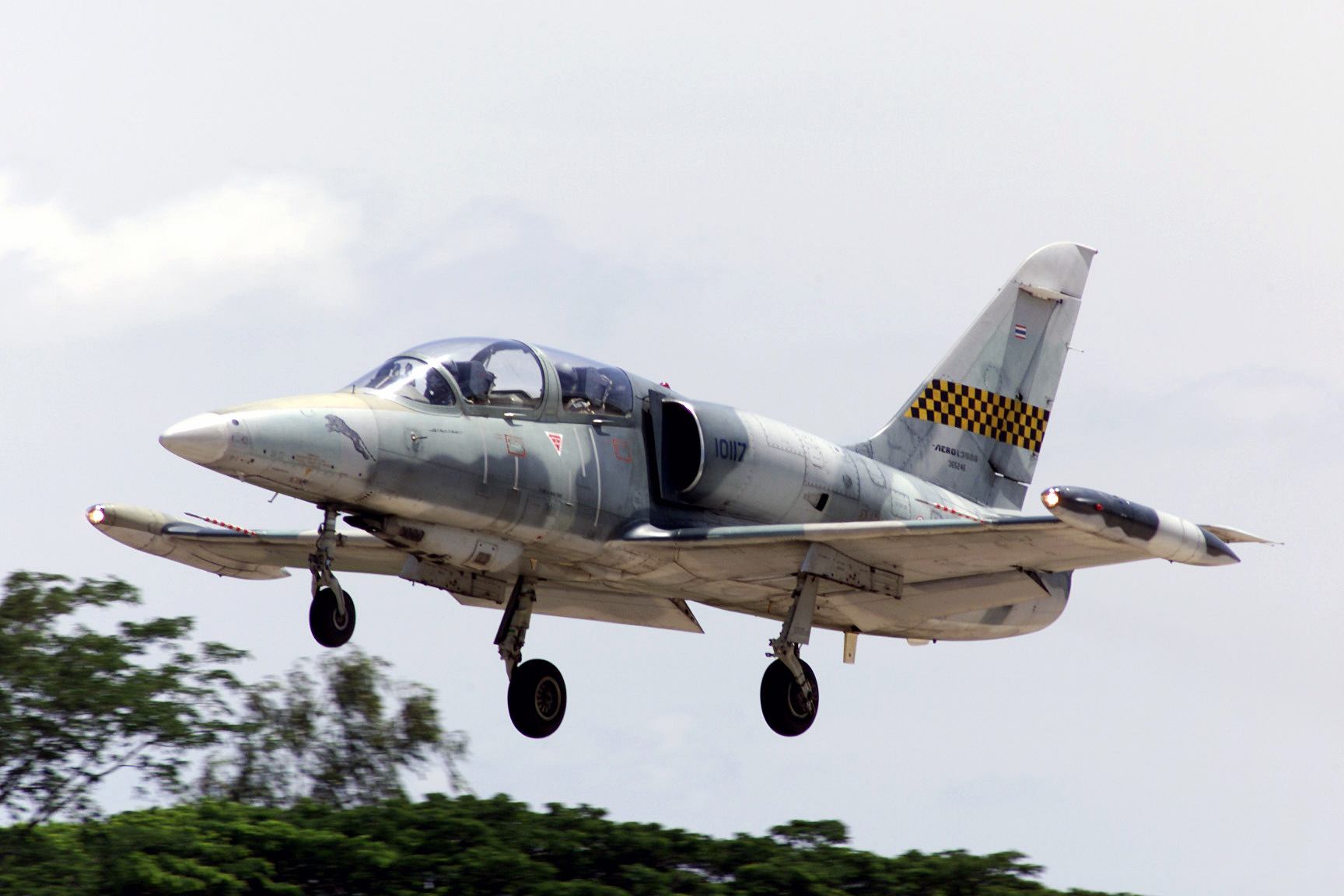
L-39 while still in service with the 101st Fighter Squadron

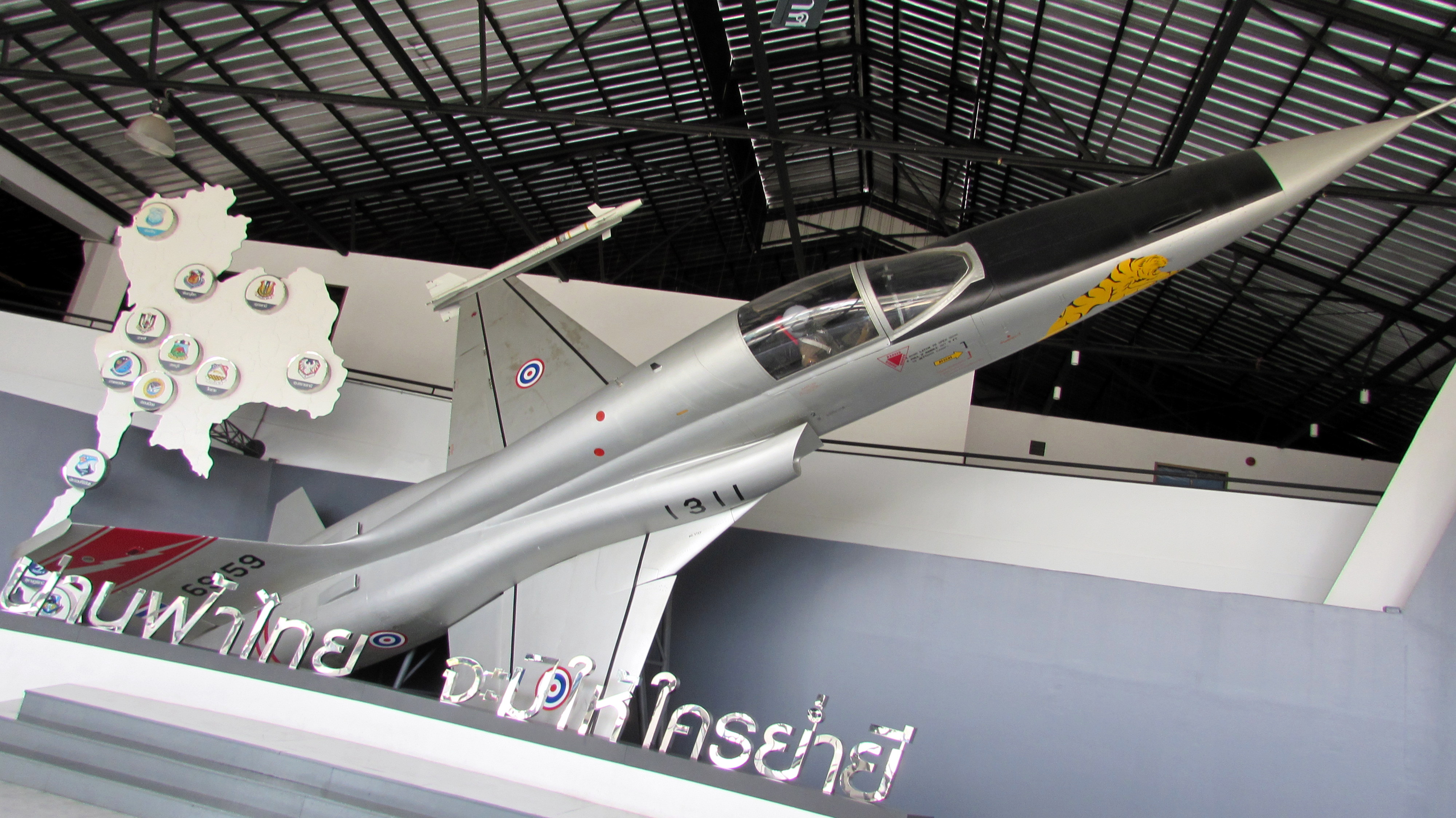
F-5 Aircraft from 103rd Fighter Squadron on display at the Royal Thai Air Force Museum

- (France) Nieuport 11 (F-1)
- (France) Nieuport 17 (F-2)
- (France) SPAD VII & XIII (F-3)
- (United Kingdom) Avro 504N (F-4)
- (France) Nieuport-Delage NiD 29 (F-4)
- (United States) Curtiss F11C Goshawk (F-9)
- (United States) Curtiss BF2C Goshawk (F-10)
- (Japan) Mitsubishi Ki-30 (A-2)
- (Japan) Nakajima Ki-27 (F-12)
- (Japan) Nakajima Ki-43 (F-13)
- (United States) North American T-6 Texan (T-8)
- (United States) Supermarine Spitfire (F-14)
- (United States) Grumman F8F Bearcat (F-15)
- (United States) Lockheed T-33 (T-11)
- (United States) Republic F-84G Thunderjet (F-16)
- (United States) North American F-86F Sabre (F-17)
- (United States) North American F-86D Sabre (F-17A)
- (United States) Northrop F-5A/B (F-18/F-18A)
- (United States) Northrop F-5E/F (F-18B/C)
- (Czechoslovakia) Aero L-39 Albatros (TF-1)

== Location ==
Wing 1 is stationed at Korat Royal Thai Air Force Base, with all of its squadrons currently based there. The air base is located approximately 5 kilometers south of the city of Nakhon Ratchasima, in northeastern Thailand. It serves as the primary operational and administrative hub for Wing 1, where its aircraft and personnel are stationed and deployed for various missions.

== Mission ==
Wing 1 is tasked with maintaining combat readiness in terms of personnel, weapons, and military equipment, as well as conducting air power operations. Its operational responsibilities are divided between its two subordinate squadrons:

- 102nd Fighter Squadron is responsible for interceptor missions, including intercepting and engaging aircraft that violate Thai airspace, as well as carrying out other assigned missions.
- 103rd Fighter Squadron is responsible for tactical fighter operations against enemy aircraft, executing air power strategies, and conducting other missions as assigned.
