= Khok Kathiam Air Force Base =

Khok Kathiam Air Force Base
- Part of Royal Thai Air Force (RTAF)
- 10 kilometres (6.2 mi) northeast of Lop Buri
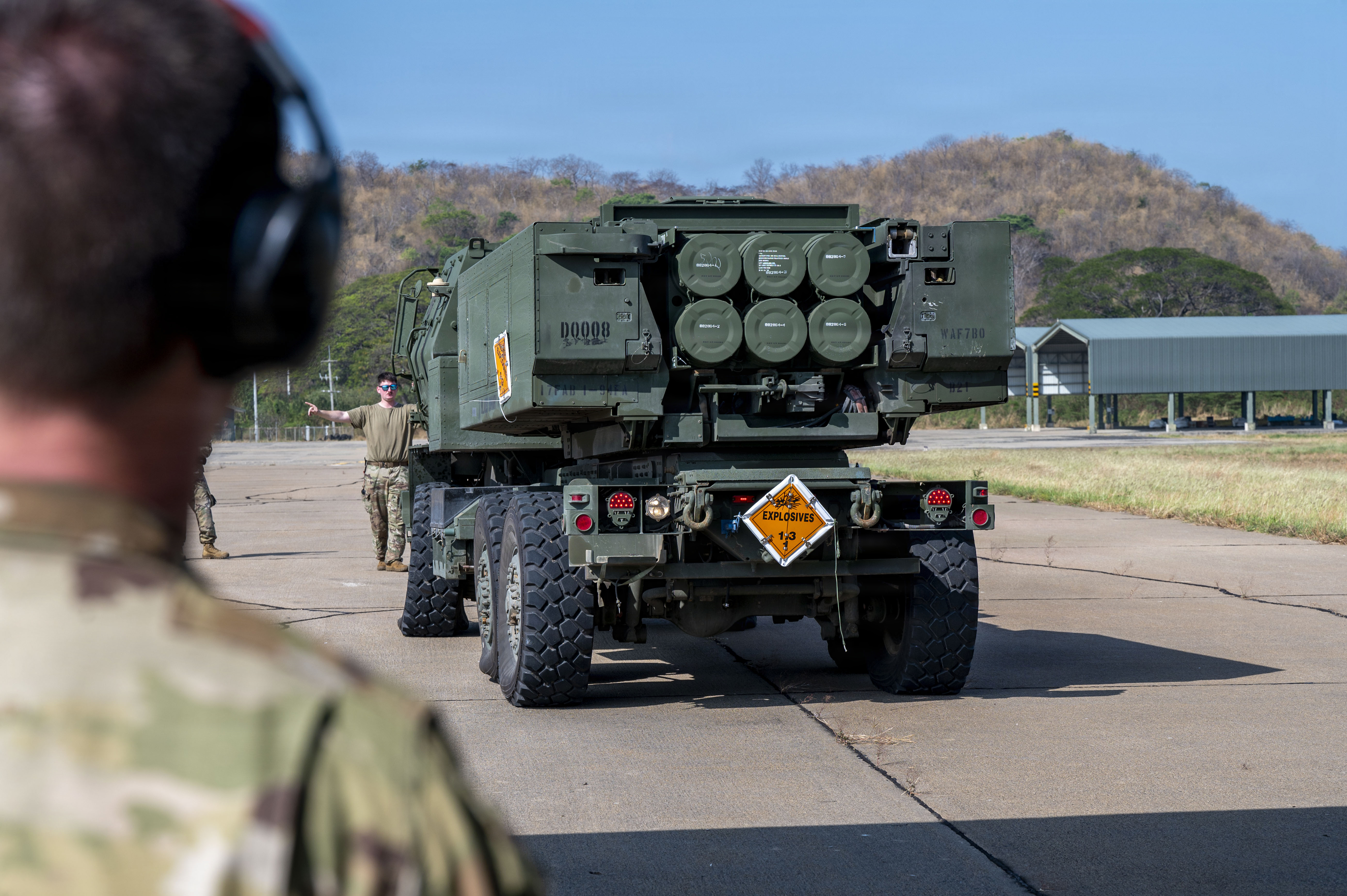

Site information
- Type: Air Force Base
- Owner: Royal Thai Air Force
- Operator: Royal Thai Air Force
- Condition: Military Air Force Base

Location
- Coordinates: 14°52′29″N 100°39′47″E

Site history
- Built: 1938

Lopburi Airport (civilian)
- IATA: KKM; ICAO: VTBL

Summary
- Elevation AMSL: 98 ft (30 m)
- Coordinates: 14°52′29″N 100°39′47″E

Map
- Location of Khok Kathiam Air Force Base

Runways
| Direction | Length | | Surface |
| Direction | ft | m | Surface |
|---|---|---|---|
| 16/34 | 7,283 | 2,220 | Asphalt |
| 05/23 | 4,400 | 1,340 | Asphalt |

Khok Kathiam Air Force Base or Lop Buri airport (IATA: KKM, ICAO: VTBL) is a Royal Thai Air Force (RTAF) base, home of the helicopter squadron, 2nd Wing 1st Air Division. It is located in Khok Kathiam, Mueang Lopburi District, in Lopburi Province, Thailand.

== History ==
In 1938, Field Marshal Plaek Phibunsongkhram, Minister of Defense, and General Prawet Wichayanuwat, Commander of the Air Force ordered the construction Khok Kathiam Air Force Base for the purpose of relocating the 2nd Air Wing. At the end of the year, it was completed, and the wing relocated its headquarters to the new airfield from Don Mueang.

== Units ==
The following lists the units based at Khok Kathiam AFB:

- No. 201 Squadron RTAF of 2nd Wing, equipped with Bell 412 and Sikorsky S-92A
- No. 203 Squadron RTAF of 2nd Wing, equipped with Bell UH-1 Iroquois and Eurocopter EC725
