= Don Muang Royal Thai Air Force Base =

Don Muang Royal Thai Air Force Base
- Part of Royal Thai Air Force (RTAF)
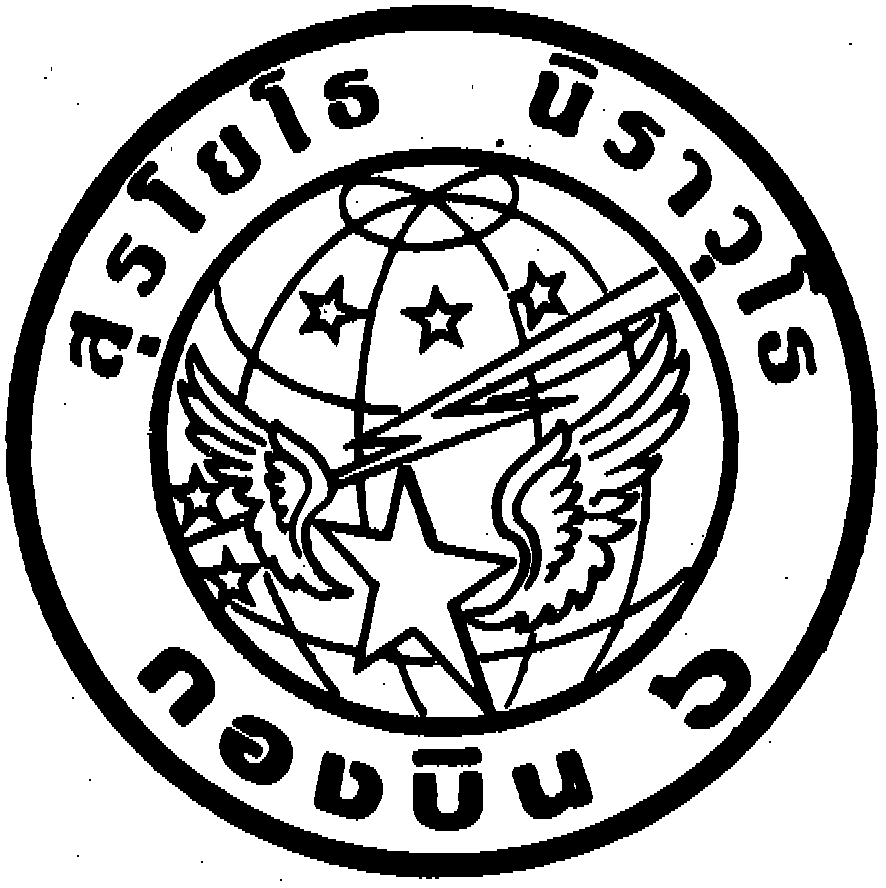
- Emblem of Wing 6, Royal Thai Air Force (Don Muang Royal Thai Air Force Base)

Site information
- Type: Air Force Base
- Owner: Royal Thai Air Force
- Operator: Royal Thai Air Force
- Controlled by: Royal Thai Air Force
- Condition: Military Air Force Base

Location
- Coordinates: 13°54′45″N 100°36′24″E

Site history
- Battles/wars: Vietnam War

Airfield information
- IATA: DMK; ICAO: VTBD

Summary
- Elevation AMSL: 9 ft (2.7 m)
- Coordinates: 13°54′45″N 100°36′24″E

Map
- Location of Don Muang Royal Thai Air Force Base

Runways
Direction	Length		Surface
Direction	ft	m	Surface
03L/21R	12,139	3,700	Asphalt
03R/21L	11,482	3,500	Asphalt

Don Muang Royal Thai Air Force Base is approximately 40 kilometres north of central Bangkok and is the main operating and command base for the Royal Thai Air Force (RTAF). In addition, units of the Royal Thai Army and Royal Thai Police have personnel located there.

The first flights to Don Muang were made on 8 March 1914 and involved the transfer of aircraft of the RTAF. Three years earlier, Thailand had sent three army officers to France to train as pilots. On completion of their training in 1911, the pilots were authorized to purchase four Breguets and four Nieuports, which formed the basis of the RTAF.

== Royal Thai Air Force units ==
Don Muang RTAFB is an active RTAF base, the home of the 1st Air Division, and consists primarily of non-combat aircraft:

- 601 Transport Squadron flies C-130H/C-130H-30.
- 602 Transport Squadron flies Airbus A310-324, Airbus A319, Airbus A340-541
- 603 Transport Squadron flies Alenia G222, BAe 748
- 604 Communications Squadron flies T-41D, Cessna 150H
- Dechochai 3 Royal Flight Unit flies Boeing 737-8z6, 737-4z8
  - 904 Aggressor Squadron Northrop F-5E Tiger II

In 1964, the United States Air Force (USAF) helped the RTAF establish a transport squadron of eight C-123 Providers there and also a squadron of 17 UH-34s.

== USAF use during the Vietnam War ==

During the early years of the Vietnam War (1961–1966), Don Muang was used as a major command and logistics hub of the USAF under the command of the United States Pacific Air Forces (PACAF) Thirteenth Air Force.

After the expansion of U-Tapao Royal Thai Navy Airfield in 1966, most American units and personnel were transferred from Don Muang, however, a small USAF liaison office remained at the base until 1975. The APO for Don Muang was APO San Francisco, 96303.

=== USAF advisory units ===
In April 1961, an advance party of the 6010th Tactical Group, USAF, arrived at Don Muang at the request of the Royal Thai government to establish an aircraft warning system. On 20 April 1961 six F-100 Super Sabres from the 510th Tactical Fighter Squadron based at Clark Air Base deployed to Don Muang in Operation "Bell Tone". In March 1962, a small detachment of F-102 Delta Daggers from the 509th Fighter-Interceptor Squadron, from Clark AB, Philippines were sent to Don Muang. Their mission was to bolster the air defense capabilities of the Royal Thai Air Force. For the next several years, a minimum of four F-102 interceptors were kept on alert at Don Muang.

In November 1961, four RF-101C reconnaissance aircraft of the 45th Tactical Reconnaissance Squadron stationed at Misawa AB, Japan, and their photo lab arrived at Don Muang under "Operation Able Marble". The RF-101s were sent to assist RTAF RT-33 aircraft in performing aerial reconnaissance flights over Laos. The RF-101s stayed until May 1962, then returned for a second deployment during November–December 1962. In November 1961, Detachment 10, 13th Air Force was established there to support USAF operations. In August 1962, elements of the 15th Tactical Reconnaissance Squadron from Kadena AB, Okinawa, were deployed to Don Muang flying RF-101Cs. On 14 August 1962, an Able Marble F-101C was hit by Pathet Lao antiaircraft fire over the Plain of Jars, but managed to return to Don Muang where it successfully made a belly-landing.

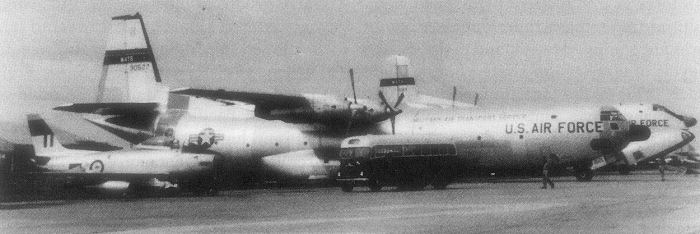
Royal Australian Air Force CAC Sabre; USAF C-133 and C-124 at Don Muang in June 1962

On 6 March 1962, a joint communication was issued by Secretary of State Dean Rusk and Thai Foreign Minister Thanat Koman in which the United States declares its "firm intention... to aid Thailand, its ally and historic friend in resisting communist aggression and subversion". As a result, the Military Assistance Command Thailand (MACT) was set up on 15 May 1962 at Don Muang. On 16 May, eleven C-130s of the 315th Air Division arrived at Don Muang carrying aerial port, flight crew and maintenance personnel to support increased air operations from Thailand. An aeromedical control center was established at Don Muang in mid-1962 and by 1963 a detachment of the 9th Aeromedical Evacuation Squadron was based there.

In June 1962, a detachment of four C-123s from the 777th Troop Carrier Squadron deployed to Don Muang. These aircraft largely provided transport to and from other RTAF bases.

In July 1962, Detachment 10 was replaced by the 6010th Tactical Group.

==== 35th Tactical Group ====
In November 1962, the 2nd Air Division assumed control of the 6010th Tactical Group. In July 1963, the group was re-designated the 35th Tactical Group. The 35th Tactical Group consisted of the following units:

- 35th Air Base Squadron – Don Muang
- 331st Air Base Squadron – Takhli Royal Thai Air Force Base
- 332nd Air Base Squadron – Ubon Royal Thai Air Force Base
- Detachment 1, 35th Tactical Group – Korat Royal Thai Air Force Base

A detachment of USAF U-21s based at Don Muang supported MACT operations, and in 1964 these were joined by two CV-2 Caribous.

By mid-1964, the situation in Southeast Asia was ambiguous. North Vietnam was determined to take over South Vietnam. Communist forces were making military and political gains in Laos. The United States was taking over the role of "protector" from France in the area and the fear was that communism would prevail over the democratic governments in the region. However, there was no real justification for a full-scale American military involvement in the region.

In early-July 1964, a detachment of C-130Bs from the 6091st Reconnaissance Squadron based at Don Muang began flying "Queen Bee" communications intercept missions off the North Vietnamese coast.

On 31 July 1964, the Gulf of Tonkin Incident occurred. It was a pair of alleged attacks by North Vietnamese gunboats on two US destroyers, the USS Maddox and the USS Turner Joy, off the North Vietnamese coast in the Gulf of Tonkin. As a result, President Johnson would order more forces to support the South Vietnamese government, and additional USAF forces were dispatched to Thailand, beginning a large scale US military presence in Southeast Asia.

In April 1965, the C-123 detachment was redesignated as Detachment 4, 315th Air Division and in September the C-123s were replaced by four C-130s. Also in April a new aerial port squadron, later designated as the 6th Aerial Port Squadron, replaced the former detachment of the 8th Aerial Port Squadron.

==== 631st Combat Support Group ====
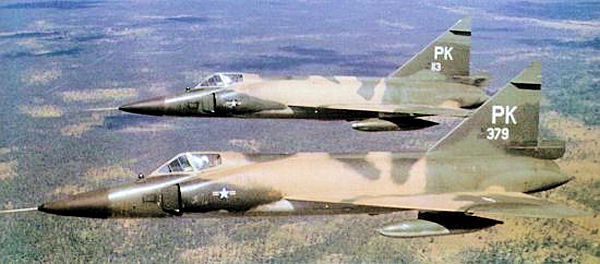
F-102 from 509th FIS TDY to Don Muang RTAFB

In July 1965, the 35th Tactical Group was re-designated the 6236th Combat Support Group and again in April 1966 it was re-designated the 631st Combat Support Group. In March 1965, there were 1,342 enlisted men stationed at Don Muang RTAFB, with their primary mission to provide support for all USAF units and detachments assigned to the base or other bases in Thailand.

Units assigned to Don Muang RTAFB were the following:

- Host Unit – 631st Combat Support Group – two Douglas C-47 Skytrains
  - Det #4 315th Air Division – seven C-130s
  - 509th Fighter Interceptor Squadron – five F-102s
  - 452nd Air Refueling Squadron – four KC-135 Stratotankers

=== USAF withdrawal from Don Muang ===
By 1966, the USAF had established a major presence in Thailand, operating from six RTAF bases. At Don Muang the USAF had stationed Strategic Air Command KC-135 tankers for refueling tactical combat aircraft over the skies of Indochina. Thailand was officially neutral in the Vietnam War and the Thai government was reluctant to allow USAF operations from its main civil airport and so most operations were moved to lower visibility RTAF bases.

The USAF 7th Air Force in Saigon wanted to have additional KC-135s in Thailand and the solution reached was to expand the U-Tapao Royal Thai Navy Airfield and base the tankers there. Expansion of U-Tapao began in October 1965, with the completed new facility opening at the end of 1967. The 11,000-foot (3,400 m) runway became operational on 6 July 1966. U-Tapao received its first complement of KC-135 tankers in August 1966. By September, the base was supporting 15 tankers.

The opening of U-Tapao also allowed the United States to route most cargo through that facility rather than having large cargo aircraft arrive in the capital. By 1970, most USAF operations had moved out of Don Muang. In late-1971, the Thai Government allowed US personnel to enter the country direct to the remote RTAF bases without needing to transit Don Muang, further reducing USAF operations there.

== See also ==
- Don Mueang International Airport
- Royal Thai Air Force Museum
- Seventh Air Force
- Thirteenth Air Force
- United States Air Force In Thailand
- United States Pacific Air Forces

== Bibliography ==
- Endicott, Judy G. (1999) Active Air Force wings as of 1 October 1995; USAF active flying, space, and missile squadrons as of 1 October 1995. Maxwell AFB, Alabama: Office of Air Force History. CD-ROM.
- Glasser, Jeffrey D. (1998). The Secret Vietnam War: The United States Air Force in Thailand, 1961–1975. McFarland & Company. ISBN 0-7864-0084-6.
- Martin, Patrick (1994). Tail Code: The Complete History of USAF Tactical Aircraft Tail Code Markings. Schiffer Military Aviation History. ISBN 0-88740-513-4.
- Ravenstein, Charles A. (1984). Air Force Combat Wings Lineage and Honors Histories 1947–1977. Maxwell AFB, Alabama: Office of Air Force History. ISBN 0-912799-12-9.
- USAAS-USAAC-USAAF-USAF Aircraft Serial Numbers--1908 to present
- The Royal Thai Air Force (English Pages)
- Royal Thai Air Force - Overview
