= 2008–2011 Cambodian–Thai border crisis =

Crisis in Southeast Asia

2008-2011 Cambodian–Thai border crisis
- Part of the Cambodia–Thailand border dispute and aftermath of Indochina wars
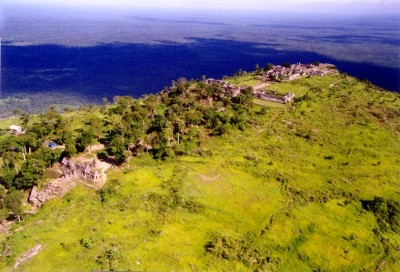
- The temple is located on a hill, oriented along a north–south axis. The plain in the upper part of this picture is the Cambodian side to the south.
Date	22 June 2008 – 21 December 2011 (3 years, 5 months, 4 weeks and 1 day)
Location	Cambodia–Thailand border
Result	Cambodian diplomatic victory; ICJ decision awards promontory of Preah Vihear to Cambodia; Beginning of 2013–2014 Thai political crisis

Belligerents
Cambodia	Thailand

Commanders and leaders
Hun Sen; Tea Banh; Meas Sophea; Hun Manet; Neth Savoeun	Abhisit Vejjajiva; Prawit Wongsuwon; Anupong Paochinda; Thawatchai Samutsakhon

Units involved
Royal Cambodian Armed Forces; Royal Cambodian Army	Royal Thai Armed Forces; Royal Thai Army; Royal Thai Police

Casualties and losses
19 soldiers killed 1 police officer killed	19 soldiers killed 14 soldiers captured (Note: 10 captured in 2008 and 4 captured in 2011); 7 activists detained
- Civilians casualties 4 Thai civilians killed 1 Cambodian civilian killed

The 2008–2011 Cambodian–Thai border crisis began in June 2008 until December 2011 as part of long-standing territorial dispute between Cambodia and Thailand involving the area surrounding Preah Vihear, an 11th-century Hindu temple in the Dângrêk Mountains, between Choam Khsant District, Preah Vihear province of northern Cambodia and the Kantharalak District, Sisaket Province of northeastern Thailand.

According to the Cambodian ambassador to the United Nations, the dispute began on 15 July 2008 when about 50 Thai soldiers moved into the Keo Sikhakirisvara Pagoda vicinity which he claimed was located in Cambodia's territory about 300 metres (980 ft) from Preah Vihear. Thailand claimed the demarcation had not yet been completed for the external parts of the area adjacent to the temple, which was adjudged to be Cambodian by a nine to three decision of the International Court of Justice (ICJ) in 1962.

By August 2008, the dispute had expanded to the 13th century Ta Moan temple complex 153 kilometres (95 mi) west of Preah Vihear (14°20′57″N 103°15′59″E), where Cambodia has accused Thai troops of occupying a temple complex it claims is on Cambodian land. The Thai foreign ministry denied that any troops had moved into that area until several were killed in an encounter in April 2011. An agreement was reached in December 2011 to withdraw troops from the disputed area.

On 11 November 2013, the ICJ declared in a unanimous decision that the 1962 ICJ judgment had awarded all of the promontory of Preah Vihear to Cambodia and that Thailand had an obligation to withdraw any Thai military, police, or guard forces stationed in that area. However, it rejected Cambodia's argument that the judgment had also awarded the hill of Phu Makhuea (three kilometers northwest of the temple) to Cambodia, finding that it had made no ruling on sovereignty over the hill.

== Background ==
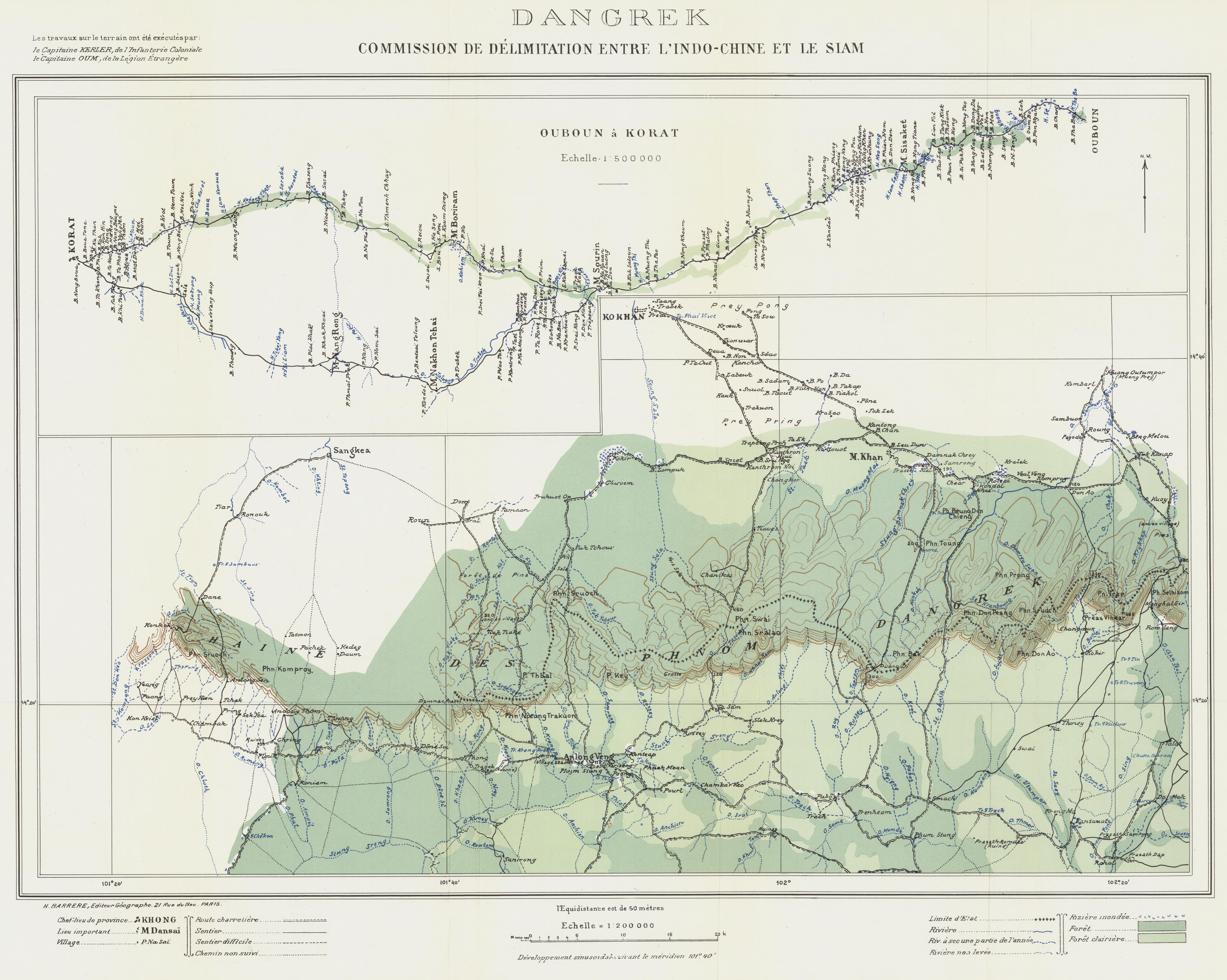
The 1909 delimitation map that gave rise to the dispute

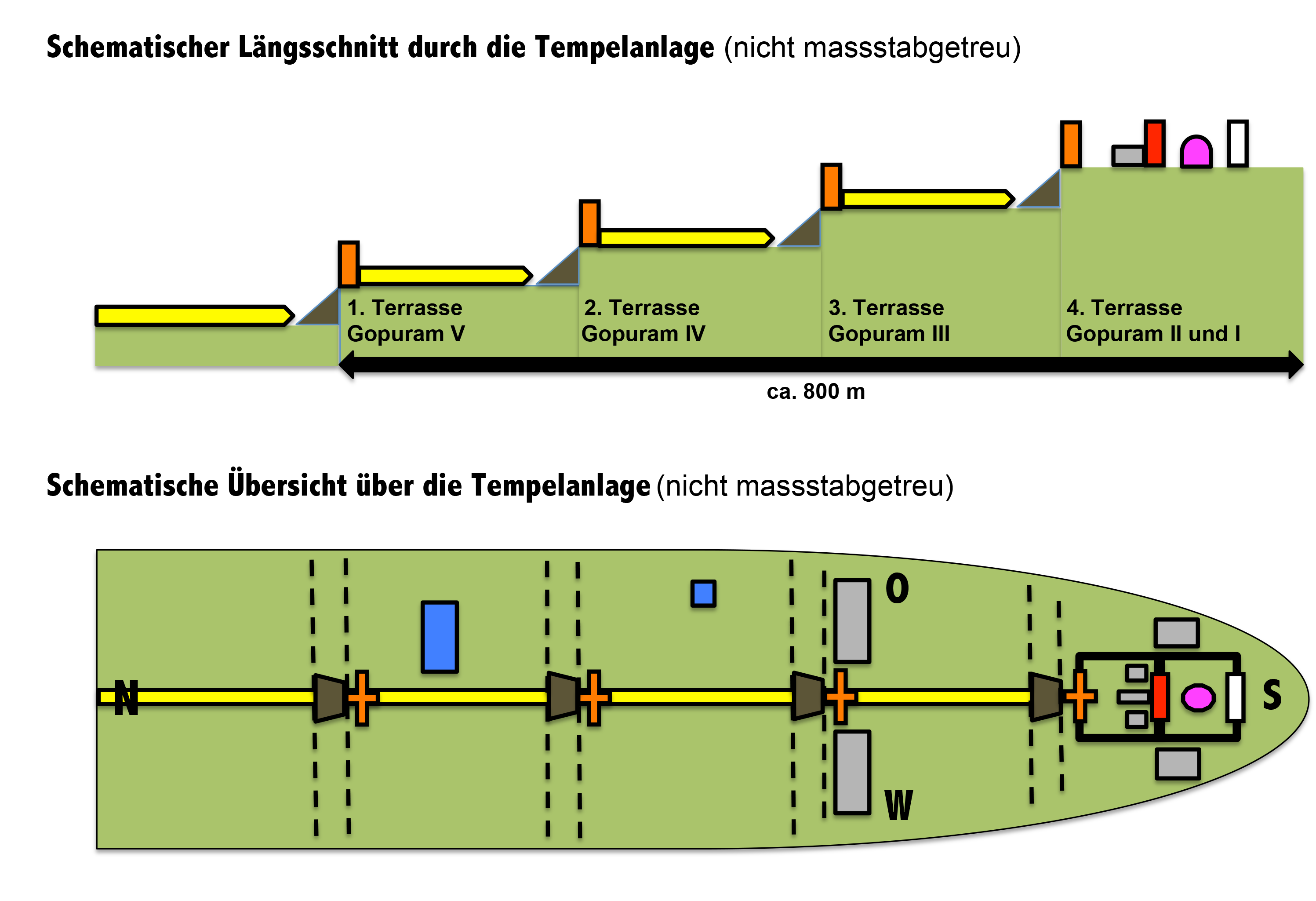
Longitudinal section of the Temple Preah Vihear

In the 1950s, a dispute between Thailand and a newly independent Cambodia arose over the ownership of the Preah Vihear temple, which stood on the two countries' borders. The dispute stemmed from demarcation maps produced in accordance with the Franco-Siamese treaties of 1904 and 1907, which defined the modern boundary between Thailand (then known as Siam) and Cambodia (then part of French Indochina). According to the treaties, the border would follow the natural watershed of the Dangrek Mountains. However, the resulting map deviated by showing Preah Vihear as being in Cambodia, even though it is on the Thai side of the watershed. Thailand accepted the map for official use. The Thais discovered the error when they made their own survey in the 1930s, but the ICJ ruled that they had waited too long to protest and lost the temple by "acquiescence".

With Cambodian Independence and the French withdrawal in 1953, the Thai military occupied Preah Vihear in 1954 in keeping with the border line of the natural watershed. The temple had been built facing north to serve the plains above it, not those of the Cambodian plain far below. However, based on the 1907 French map, Cambodia protested, insisting that it was inside their territory. Both countries finally agreed to submit the dispute to the International Court of Justice and abide by its decision.

In 1962, the International Court of Justice (ICJ) awarded ownership of Preah Vihear to Cambodia by a nine to three vote, stating the 1907 map clearly showed Preah Vihear as being in Cambodia. Nevertheless, the court had only ruled that the temple belongs to Cambodia, and did not comment on the adjacent land to the north. Thailand reluctantly handed over the temple but continues to claim the surrounding area, insisting the border has never officially been demarcated here.

The ownership dispute revived in recent years when Cambodia submitted an application to UNESCO requesting that Preah Vihear be designated as a World Heritage Site. Thailand contended the application requested the designation include the land surrounding the temple, which Thailand still considers its territory. In the interest of cross-border relations Cambodia withdrew the application, and after winning support from Thailand, submitted a modified map requesting the designation only for the temple itself.

The People's Alliance for Democracy (PAD), a right wing Thai protest group, turned the temple into a cause célèbre wedge issue in its battles against the People Power Party government of Prime Minister Samak Sundaravej in their attempts to unseat the former and current Cabinet of Thailand. In 2006 PAD-led street protests led first to the Thai general election of April 2006, largely boycotted by the opposition and won by then-incumbent Prime Minister Thaksin Shinawatra's Thai Rak Thai Party. This was followed by the military coup of September 2006, which ousted Thaksin, the caretaker prime minister. Prime Minister Samak Sundaravej was viewed as a proxy for the self-exiled Thaksin Shinawatra, who was living abroad to avoid conviction for corruption.

Across the border, the Cambodian People's Party (CPP) government of Prime Minister Hun Sen used the possibly coincidental timing of UNESCO's annual meeting and the listing of the temple as a World Heritage site in campaigning for the 27 July 2008 parliamentary election.

The old Khmer legend of Preah Ko Preak Keo has been referred to in this context by Cambodian politicians to illustrate the difficult ties that the country has with neighbouring Thailand.

== Timeline ==
=== Lead-up to 2008 fighting ===
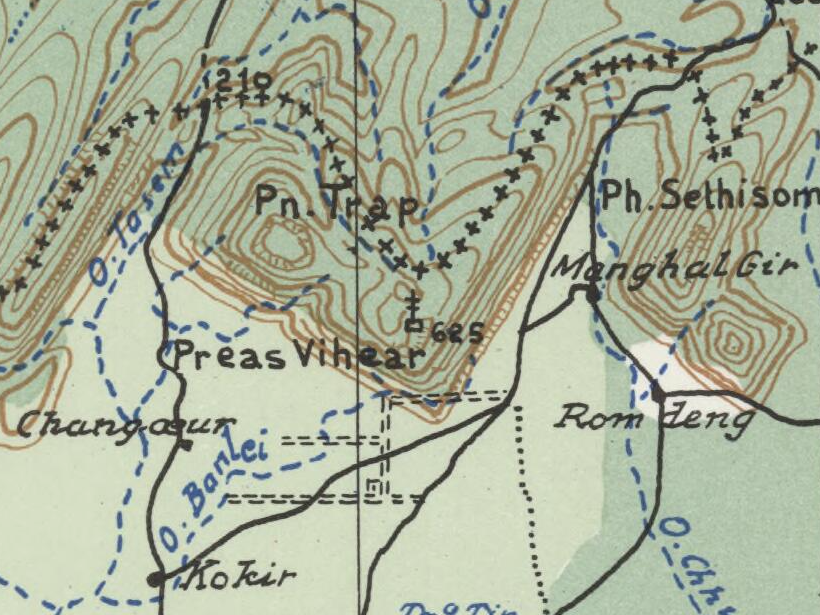
Map showing the boundary between Thailand and Cambodia in Dângrêk Mountains region

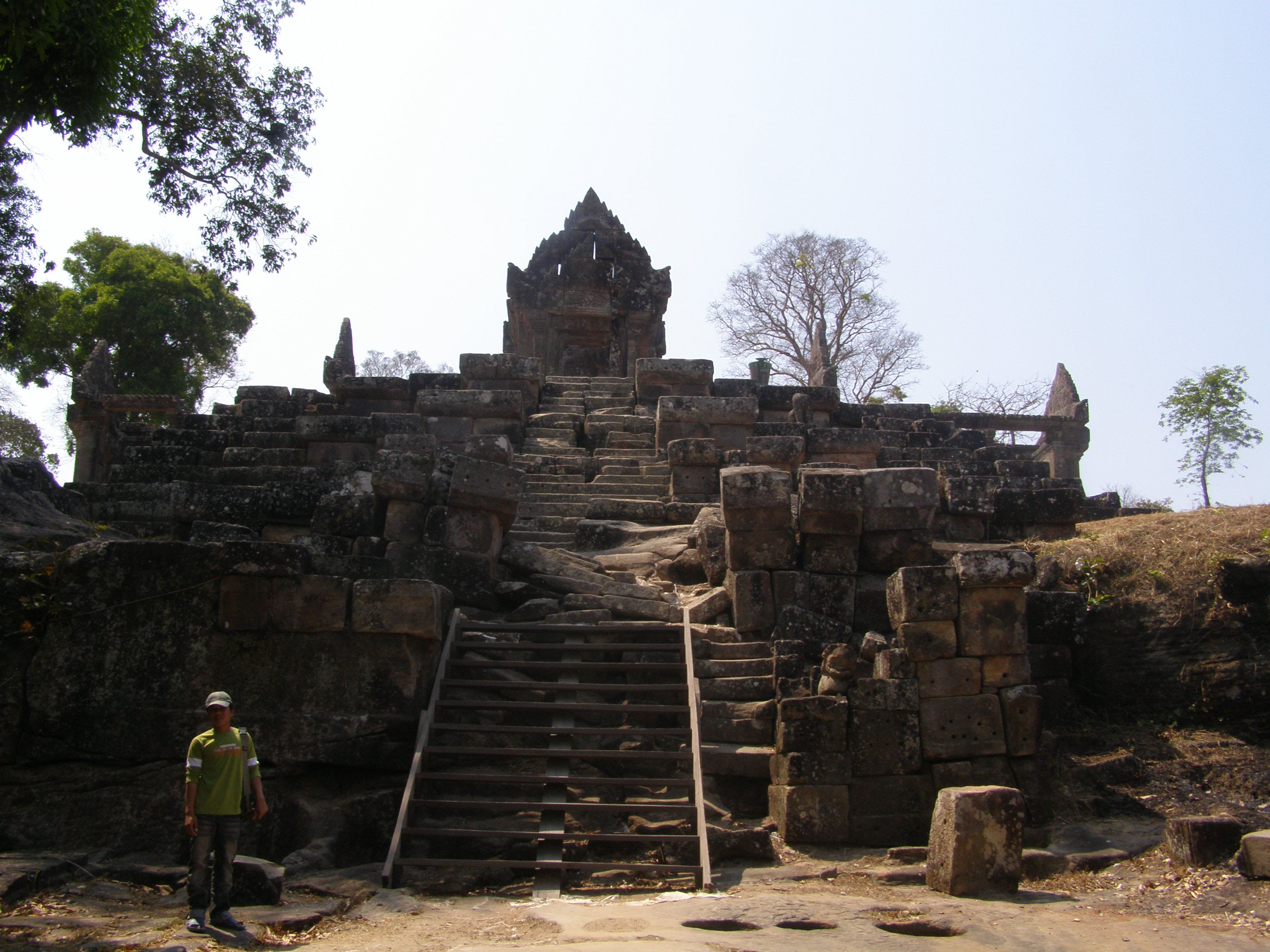
Temple of Preah Vihear in 2008

- January 2008
  - In January 2008, the Thai Defense Ministry from the 56th Cabinet of Thailand protested Cambodia's attempt to register the temple as a UNESCO World Heritage Site without agreement from Thailand.
- March 2008
  - In March 2008, Cambodia informed Thailand of their plan to register Preah Vihear as a World Heritage Site.
- April 2008
  - In April 2008, Thailand (the 57th cabinet) and Cambodia planned to discuss the issue before the registration. Thailand insisted that it would support the registration of the temple, but that the process "must not affect the disputed borderline".
- June 2008
  - On June 18, 2008, Thailand and Cambodia issued a joint communique regarding the temple registration.
  - On June 20, 2008 the Nation newspaper in Bangkok published an editorial online highly critical of the People's Alliance for Democracy for its use of Preah Vihear in its campaign against the People Power Party government of Prime Minister Samak Sundaravej.
  - On June 22, 2008, Cambodia closed the border crossing to Preah Vihear in response to Thai protests held at the border crossing. The protests were championed by an anti-Thaksin opposition figure, Sonthi Limthongkul, who claimed the government of Thai Prime Minister Samak Sudaravej had gained business concessions in Cambodia in return for ceding Thai territory to Cambodia when negotiating over the Preah Vihear site map that would be presented to UNESCO in Quebec, Canada.
- July 2008
  - On July 2, 2008, as UNESCO began its annual meeting in Quebec, Canada, the Bangkok Post online published a Deutsche Presse-Agentur (German Press Agency) report that erroneously stated that Preah Vihear partially sits on Thai territory. Following the Thai government's decision to support Cambodia's bid for World Heritage listing, anti-Thaksin Shinawatra opposition figures mounted a legal challenge against Thai Foreign Minister Noppadon Pattama.
    - The Thai Constitutional Court finally upheld the suit on July 7, 2008 in an eight to one judgment that the foreign minister's joint communique with Cambodia was "unconstitutional". Whilst UNESCO met in Quebec, Canada, there were about 20 Thai people standing and protesting outside holding sign "Noppadon, you are a LIAR" and Thai flags.
  - On 8 July 2008, thousands of Phnom Penh residents marched to celebrate UNESCO's inscription of Preah Vihear. That evening, the Municipality of Phnom Penh hosted an outdoor concert at Wat Phnom, nationally broadcast on CTN, featuring traditional Khmer performances and a fireworks display. Despite persistent rain, thousands attended.
  - On July 10, 2008, Thai Foreign Minister Noppadon Pattama resigned over the listing of Preah Vihear by UNESCO. His resignation followed the eight to one judgment by the Thai Constitutional Court that he had violated Article 190 of Thailand's 2007 Constitution, which calls for a public debate and cabinet-level approval before such authorization can take place.
  - On July 14, 2008, 8,000 Cambodians filled Phnom Penh's Olympic Stadium Indoor Arena for a concert hosted by Deputy Prime Minister Sok An and simulcast on Bayon Television. Sok An had just returned from UNESCO's annual conference in Quebec, Canada, where Preah Vihear was inscribed as a World Heritage site.
  - On July 15, 2008, cross-border tensions flared after Cambodian authorities arrested three Thai nationals who had attempted to plant the Thai flag near the temple. Cambodia claimed that several dozen Thai soldiers subsequently crossed the border. One Thai soldier lost his leg to a Cambodian landmine detonation.
    - Thailand maintains its troops are deployed to protect its sovereignty and ensure that any protests by Thais near the temple remain orderly, although a senior Thai military official acknowledged that his troops were on "disputed" ground.
  - On July 16, 2008, Thailand increased the number of troops stationed in the border region adjacent to Preah Vihear.
  - On July 17, 2008, the total number of troops at the temple increased to over 1,000, with some of the 400 Thai troops in the area occupying a Buddhist pagoda near the temple and claimed by Cambodia. Thai forces denied they were inside Cambodian territory.
    - In a letter to the Thai Prime Minister, Cambodian Prime Minister Hun Sen called for the immediate withdrawal of Thai troops and protesters from the area.
  - On July 18, 2008, the Thai government handed Cambodia a letter from Prime Minister Samak Sundaravej insisting Thai troops are deployed on Thai soil. In a letter to Hun Sen, the Thai PM said Cambodian troops and buildings on the disputed 4.6 km^{2} (1.8 sq mi) area were a "violation of Thailand's sovereignty and territorial integrity", but that his government was "resolved to seek a just and peaceful solution to the situation."
  - On July 19, 2008, the Thai and Cambodian governments sent more troops and heavy guns to the disputed border ahead of high-level talks scheduled for July 21, 2008 between the Cambodian defence minister and Thailand's supreme military commander.
  - On July 21, 2008, Cambodian Defence Minister Tea Ban and Thai Army commander Boonsrang Niempradit held talks in Thailand. The talks achieved no outcome.
  - On July 22, 2008, Thailand rejected the assistance of ASEAN in resolving the border dispute. Thailand's statement came as ASEAN foreign ministers began a meeting in Singapore. The BBC reported that Cambodia had requested UN assistance in resolving the border dispute. The previous week the Cambodian government denied it had made such a call after similar news stories were published.
  - On July 23, 2008, a spokesman for Cambodia's prime minister suggested that Cambodia may take the case to the International Court of Justice, as was done in 1962.
  - On July 24, 2008, Cambodia announced it would postpone its request to the United Nations until the bilateral negotiation at Siem Reap on July 28, 2008 was finished.
    - Cambodia and Thailand held the meeting on 28 July 2008 without any results.
    - Reportedly, both sides are in favour of a troop withdrawal, beginning with Thailand's army; the date when Thailand would withdraw its troops was not agreed on, however.
- August 2008
  - On August 1, 2008, Bun Rany, wife of Cambodian Prime Minister Hun Sen, conducted a Buddhist ritual at the temple; thousands of Cambodians also joined the ritual. On the same night, the Thai anti-Thaksin and anti-government People's Alliance for Democracy (PAD) led thousands of their supporters in a rival ritual, by praying Suttas that the Gautama Buddha gave to his monks; they claimed this was to prevent any negative effects from the Cambodian ritual. Many Thais accused Bun Rany of conducting black magic aimed to weaken Thailand.
  - On August 1, 2008, The Nation (Thailand) newspaper in Thailand published an editorial criticizing Cambodia for calling on the international community to help resolve the Preah Vihear stand-off.
  - On August 3, 2008, Cambodia claimed that Thailand occupied a second Angkorian-era temple complex, Ta Moan Thom and Ta Moan Touch, at 14°20′57″N 103°15′59″E on the border of Oddar Meanchey Province.
  - On August 5, 2008, Kriengkrai Sampatchalit, Thailand's Fine Arts Department director replied to Cambodia, claiming that "The Prasat Ta Moan Thom Temple is located just about 100 metres (330 ft) from the border on Thai soil."
    - According to the Thai authorities, the Ta Moan Thom complex is in Thai territory as evidenced by the Fine Arts Department's registration of the ancient ruin as a Thailand national archaeological site 73 years ago in 1935, despite the ruin being 300 metres (980 ft) south of the border's watershed ridgeline.
    - Tharit Charungvat, Thailand ministry's chief spokesman said, "Thailand has not boosted the number of its troops [in Ta Moan Thom Temple]."
    - Thai army chief Anupong Paochinda said Thai troops would remain at Ta Moan Thom because the temple is in Thailand.
  - On August 7, 2008, ASEAN reported that both Thailand and Cambodia have withdrawn their troops from the Ta Moan Thom temple area to their original bases, according to AFP (Agence France-Presse).
    - Thai Prime Minister Samak Sundaravej reportedly is expected to visit the area near Preah Vihear, but not the temple itself, according to Cambodian sources. Cambodia and Thailand will hold a second foreign ministers' meeting in Thailand on 18 August 2008 to seek a peaceful solution to the 25-day-long military standoff over the border dispute.
  - On August 14, 2008, both nations' militaries agreed to reduce troop levels at Preah Vihear prior to a meeting between their foreign ministers.
- September 2008
  - In September 2008, Cambodia accused Thailand of sending troops to occupy the Ta Moan Thom and Ta Kwai temples. Thailand responded that the temples belong to them and are part of Surin province and that The Thai Fine Arts Department have done a registration of the ancient ruins since 1935.

=== Military Clashes ===
==== 2008 ====
===== October =====
- On October 3, 2008, Thai and Cambodian troops exchanged fire with each other on the disputed territory near Preah Vihear. The fighting lasted for nearly three minutes, wounding two Thai soldiers and one Cambodian soldier.
- On October 4, 2008, commanders of the two countries met at their disputed border area amid accusations that each side had caused a border skirmish on the previous day. Hosted by the Cambodian commander in the area Srey Dek and his Thai counterpart Colonel Chayan Huaysoongnern, the two sides called for the situation to return to normal.
- On October 6, 2008, two Thai soldiers were wounded by landmines in the border area after allegedly wandering 1 kilometre (0.62 mi) into Cambodian territory.
- On October 13, 2008, Cambodian Prime Minister Hun Sen, issued an ultimatum to Thailand to withdraw troops from a disputed border area by noon Tuesday, October 14, 2008. Hun Sen said Thai troops had advanced on a border area called Veal Intry (Eagle Field) near the temple in an attempt to occupy Cambodian land near Preah Vihear. "They must withdraw," he said. Thailand's Prime Minister, Somchai Wongsawat, said he had ordered the army to "take care of the situation so there is no violence." "We do not object to redeployment so there is no confrontation," Somchai told reporters, adding that he was not aware of Hun Sen's deadline.
- On October 14, 2008 in a televised interview, People's Alliance for Democracy leader (and future Foreign Minister) Kasit Piromya called Hun Sen "crazy", a "slave", and a "nak leng" (commonly translated as "gangster").
- On October 15, 2008, Cambodian and Thai forces opened fire on each other once again in the border area. Three Cambodian soldiers were killed and two wounded. Seven Thai soldiers were wounded, one of whom died of his injuries a week later. The Cambodians claimed to have captured 10 Thai soldiers during the battle, but the Thais denied this. Still, Reuters published photos of the soldiers being held by Cambodian troops. Although commanders from both sides were trying to negotiate a ceasefire, Thailand urged Thai nationals to leave Cambodia.
- On October 18, 2008, a Thai soldier was accidentally killed by his own weapon at Phu Ma Khua.

===== November–December =====
- From November 25 to December 3, 2008, the People's Alliance for Democracy executed "Operation Hiroshima": the seizure of Suvarnabhumi Airport. During occupation of the airport, PAD leader Kasit Piromya gave a speech in which he said "I will use Hun Sen's blood to wash my feet," recalling the historic incident where King Naresuan of Siam did the same to King Lovek of Cambodia. The siege ended when the constitutional court dissolved the government of Somchai Wongsawat, resulting in the rise to power of Abhisit Vejjajiva as prime minister and Kasit as foreign minister.

==== 2009 ====
===== April =====
- On April 2, 2009, a Thai soldier stepped on a mine and lost his leg in the border area.
- On April 3, 2009, fighting between Thai and Cambodian forces left at least three Thai soldiers and two Cambodian soldiers dead; another five Thai soldiers were wounded. Just days before this clash, Cambodian officials said that up to 100 Thai soldiers crossed into Cambodian territory and did not leave until Cambodian soldiers showed up and asked them to leave. The Royal Thai Army denied the claim and said that Thai soldiers had not gone anywhere they were not permitted to be. Cambodia's Prime Minister Hun Sen then warned Thailand for the second time that if they (Thai soldiers) cross again, Thai soldiers would face fighting again with Cambodian soldiers. He said, "I tell you first, if you enter (Cambodian territory) again, we will fight. The troops at the border have already received the order."

==== 2010 ====
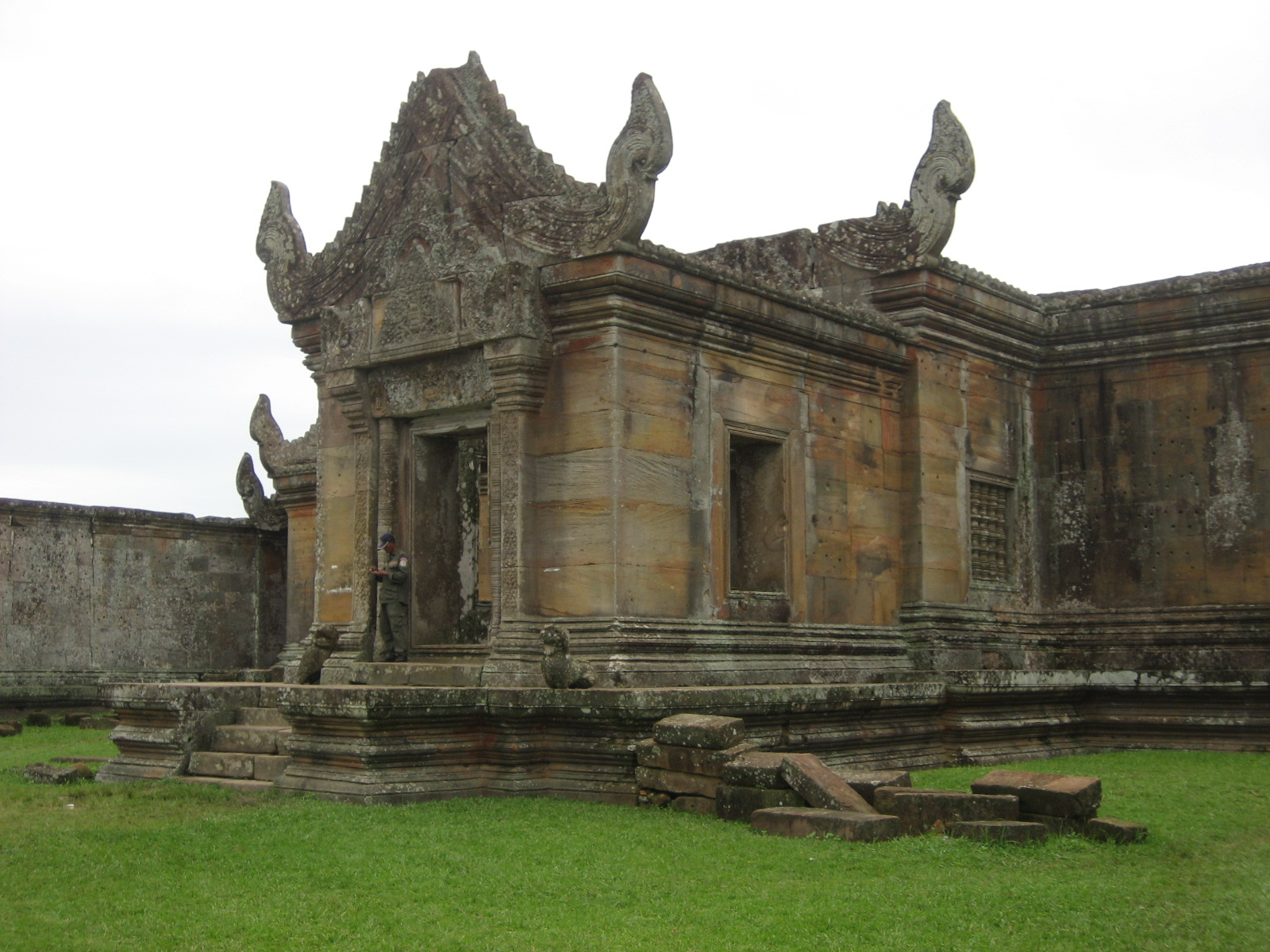
Preah Vihear Temple in 2010

===== January =====
- On January 24, 2010, Cambodian and Thai forces opened fire on each again in the border area. As Thai Rangers shouted at Cambodian soldiers asking their purpose in crossing over to the area, the Cambodian soldiers fired M79 grenade launchers and automatic rifles at them, Col. Nut said, which left two Thai soldiers wounded.
- On January 25, 2010, Cambodian and Thai troops exchanged gunfire twice on Sunday morning at the contested border near Preah Vihear. The Cambodians subsequently fired eight RPG (B-40) rockets into Thai territory.
- On January 30, 2010, soldiers from the two countries exchanged fire for two or three minutes on Friday evening.
- On January 31, 2010, a Thai soldier was killed in clashes between Thai and Cambodian forces in the disputed border area troops from the two sides fought for about 15 minutes late Friday after about 20 Thai soldiers crossed into Cambodian territory and refused to leave when confronted by Cambodian soldiers. Cambodian Defense Ministry spokesman Lt. Gen. Chhum Socheat said one Thai soldier was killed, with Cambodian troops firing AK-47 assault rifles and B-40 rocket propelled grenades.

===== April =====
- On April 16, 2010 Cambodian and Thai forces opened fire along their border about 150 kilometres (93 mi) west of Preah Vihear. The clash lasted for about 15 minutes, but there were no reports of casualties. Cambodian Defence Ministry spokesman Chhum Socheat was reported as saying that "[...] While our troops were patrolling the border, the Thai soldiers opened fire at them. So our troops fired back." He added that troops from both sides fired rockets and grenades as well as rifles, but calm returned after a meeting between Cambodian and Thai military commanders in the area. The Thai military confirmed the shoot-out. "It was a misunderstanding and nobody was injured in the clash," said a Thai Army officer who asked not to be named.

==== 2011 ====
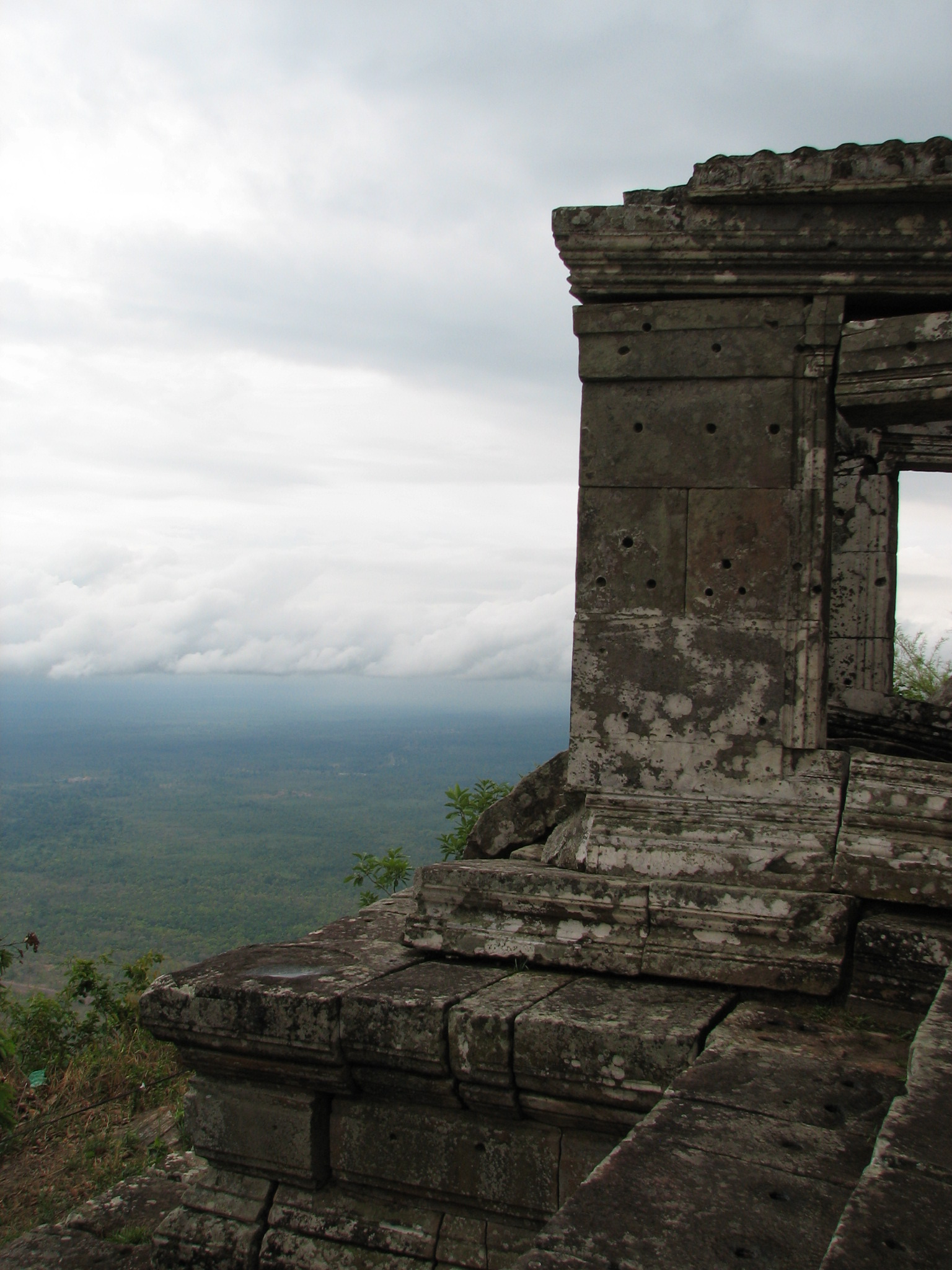
View of Cambodia from Temple of Preah Vihear in 2011

===== February =====
- On February 4, 2011, a skirmish in a gray zone in the overlap of Thailand and Cambodia territory called Phu Makua Hill started with an exchange of fire from 15:15 to 18:00 (GMT+7). Later, a ceasefire was called by local forces. One Thai civilian in Ban Phumsrol village of Sisaket Province's Kantharalak district died instantaneously and seven or more buildings, including Phum Srol School, were hit by Cambodian artillery rounds. Three houses were set ablaze. The Cambodian government claimed 16–33 Thai soldiers were killed, 26 wounded, and four captured, with two tanks destroyed. Thai news stations reported 64 Cambodian soldiers were killed and two tanks, 16 armoured vehicles, six artillery guns, and four multiple launch rocket systems were destroyed. Independent sources confirmed that three Cambodians, including two soldiers, and a Thai villager were killed; also 10 Cambodian and eight Thai soldiers were wounded and four Thai soldiers were captured.
- On February 5, 2011, both sides exchanged fire again, starting from 06:25 (GMT+7) in three skirmishes at Chongdon-awn. The Thai army confirmed one Thai sergeant was killed by shrapnel and four soldiers wounded in the clash. In the afternoon, both sides signed a ceasefire with four conditions: 1. stop firing; 2. don't increase troop strength at the site; 3. do not cause an accident; 4. more communication.
- On February 6, 2011, despite signing a ceasefire earlier that day, renewed clashes occurred in the evening. According to reports, the fighting extended over 10 kilometres (6.2 mi) from Phum Srol village to Phu Makhua mountain. At 08:17, Cambodian troops opened fire at Thai military personnel stationed at Phu Ma Khua and Phlan Yao as well as villagers in Thai territory using rocket propelled grenades. Several Thai villagers were reportedly injured. Baan Phum Srol school director Boonruam Pongsaphan stated that "I believe that this is no longer a misunderstanding. This is war because the Cambodian side is firing into residential areas, not military zones". Thousands of villagers from Kantharalak were evacuated. Cambodia claimed that more than 20 Thai soldiers died in the clashes. In the evening, Thai troops reportedly attacked Cambodian lines by trying to cross into Cambodia's territory despite the earlier cease fire agreement. There were reports that Cambodian troops captured Don Tuan temple that is over 10 kilometres (6.2 mi) from the previous clash sites and Don Tuan temple is in Thai territory. It was reported that the heavy shelling of Preah Vihear by Thai forces caused a part of it to collapse. Since the start of the fighting, Cambodian troops had been entrenched in the 900-year-old ruins of the temple in a camp made up of several bunkers. They had been positioned high on a ridge with a commanding view of the Cambodian plains, but highly vulnerable to fire from Thai positions just a few hundred metres away.
- On February 7, 2011, around two in the morning, the artillery fire finally stopped. However, sporadic fighting resumed later in the morning, after Thai troops attempted an operation to recover casualties from the previous day's heavy fighting. Clashes ceased again at 11:00. Both sides blamed each other for the incident. Cambodian civilians living near the contested area were evacuated by Cambodian authorities. The People's Alliance for Democracy called for Prime Minister Abhisit Vejjajiva to step down. Cambodia called for a UN Buffer Zone at the Thai border. Later that day, independent sources stated the toll for the previous three days of fighting to be 10 killed: one soldier and one civilian from Thailand and four soldiers and four civilians from Cambodia. 34 Thais (30 soldiers and four civilians) and 45 Cambodians (soldiers and civilians) were wounded. The four captured Thai soldiers were released.
- On February 8, 2011, there were no reported shooting incidents. However, Cambodian troops reportedly used the fragile ceasefire to dig new positions and to set up sandbags. A Thai soldier, who was severely wounded during the shellings on February 6, 2011, died of his wounds at Sapphasithiprasong Hospital.
- On February 9, 2011, Hun Sen officially called the recent clashes a war, stating that "Thailand created this war. [Thai Prime Minister] Abhisit must be responsible for the war" and "Our war with Thailand will be taking long time". He also made it clear that there would be no more talks without a third party, stating that "There will be no more bilateral talks, and all negotiations will be participated by the third party [sic]." In a later statement, he said "This is a real war. It is not a clash". Hundreds of Cambodian troops camped near the battleground, effectively strengthening their hold on the temple.
- On February 15, 2011, a new skirmish occurred. The shooting incident lasted for a few minutes. Although local media reported that five Thai soldiers were wounded, the army stated that only one soldier was injured during the fighting.
- On February 16, 2011, the clashes intensified. During the day, three clashes occurred (05:00, 20:00, and 22:00), but there were no reported casualties on either side. Thai army spokesman Colonel Sansern Kaewkamnerd stated that the Cambodians started it all with the use of mortars and rocket-propelled-grenades, forcing the Thais to retaliate. However, Phay Siphan, a spokesman for Cambodia's Council of Ministers, denies his country's troops fired first. He said Thai soldiers attacked first. Both sides blame the other for starting the fighting. Cambodia wants international help to prevent further fighting, while Thailand says the issue should be resolved bilaterally. The same day, unconfirmed reports claimed that Vietnamese tanks were moving towards the Cambodian–Thai border. However, Hun Sen strongly denied it.
- In an agreement reached at a meeting of ASEAN in Jakarta, Cambodia and Thailand agreed to allow Indonesian observers to monitor disputed border territory by up to 40 military and civilian observers. "This is an observer team, not a peacekeeping or peace enforcement team. The observer team will be unarmed," Indonesian Foreign Minister Marty Natalegawa said.

===== April =====
- On April 7, 2011, Thailand admitted using Dual-Purpose Improved Conventional Munition (DPICM) during the clash, which has been identified by the Cluster Munition Coalition (CMC) as a type of cluster munition. These contain up to hundreds of small grenades or "bomblets" that scatter over vast areas, and are banned by the majority of countries under the Convention on Cluster Munitions. Thailand has not signed the pact, but has publicly pledged not to use such weapons. The CMC said this was the first confirmed use of cluster munitions since the convention became international law.
- On 22 April 22, 2011, a five-hour clash erupted along the border between Phanom Dong Rak District of Surin Province, Thailand and the Banteay Ampil District of Oddar Meanchey Province, Cambodia at the Ta Moan temple complex 14°20′57″N 103°15′59″E 153 kilometres (95 mi) west of Preah Vihear and at Ta Krabey temple complex 15 kilometres (9.3 mi) east of Ta Moan, with reports that both sides used rocket launchers, machine guns, and rifles. According to the Thai army, the fighting erupted after dawn and continued for over half an hour. Four Thai and three Cambodian soldiers were reported killed and eight Thai and six Cambodian soldiers were reported wounded.
- On 23 April 23, 2011, the fighting with mostly long-distance shelling resumed about 06:00 and halted by noon. A Cambodian defence ministry statement accused Thai aircraft of entering Cambodian airspace. The statement also said Thai forces had fired 75- and 105-mm shells loaded with poisonous gas into Cambodia's territory, an allegation that could not be independently verified and that Thailand rejected. A Cambodian field commander claimed that the "poison smoke" caused several soldiers who inhaled it to lose strength in their arms and legs. Col. Suos Sothea, deputy commander of the artillery unit, said that six rounds of cluster shells had landed in villages about 20 km (12 mi) inside Cambodia, but caused no casualties since residents had already been evacuated. Col. Tawatchai Samutsakorn, commander of Thailand's 2nd Army Region, denied absolutely that cluster bombs or poison gas had been employed. Tawatchai said one Thai soldier died, bringing the two-day casualty toll to four dead and 17 wounded, and that 15,000 civilians had been evacuated from the area of fighting. Cambodia's Suos Sothea said three soldiers from his country had been killed, bringing Cambodia's two-day death toll to six. According to vice-president of the Cambodian National Committee for Disaster Management, Mr Nhim Vanda, roughly 5,000 residents had been evacuated to a safe shelter in the Samrong district of Banteay Meanchey Province, some 30 kilometres (19 mi) from the fighting zone.
- On April 25, 2011, the fighting continued, after an almost full-day break.
- On April 26, 2011, the fighting resumed for a fifth day. The fighting had now spread to a nearby temple. By this point, five Thai soldiers were killed and more than 35 wounded, and eight Cambodian soldiers were killed, 17 were wounded and one was missing.
- On April 27, 2011, a Thai civilian was reported to have been killed in the fighting.
- On April 28, 2011, two more Thai soldiers were confirmed killed in the fighting. The same day, Thailand and Cambodia agreed upon a ceasefire. Cambodian spokesman Phay Siphan said that "We will abide by the ceasefire from now on and local commanders will meet regularly to avoid misunderstanding".
- On April 29, 2011, the ceasefire was broken, as one Thai soldier was confirmed killed in the fighting. A Thai military spokesmen said 11 Thai soldiers were hurt in the clashes with a total of 58 soldiers wounded since the start of the fighting.
- On April 30, 2011, the fighting resumed for a ninth day. However, there were no casualties.

===== May =====
- On May 1, 2011, a Cambodian soldier was killed. The death toll had reached 17, including: nine Cambodian and seven Thai soldiers and one Thai civilian. Ninety-five Thais, including 50 soldiers, and 18 Cambodian servicemen had been wounded since the start of the fighting. According to Thai army spokesman Col. Prawit Hukaew, the two sides had engaged each other with automatic weapons overnight Sunday. According to Thailand, no Thai troops was killed in the clashes. In the afternoon, the Cambodian Ministry of Defense issued a statement which condemned Thailand for ten straight days of armed conflict; "The repeated invasions of Thai troops into Cambodia have caused gradual damage to Cambodia, it is an unacceptable act".
- On May 2, 2011, the two sides engaged each other with automatic fire, but no casualties was reported. Cambodia also filed a case at the International Court of Justice on that day.
- On May 3, 2011, a Thai soldier was killed during skirmish in Surin, bringing the death toll on the Thai side to 12. Cambodia claimed Thailand had fired 50,000 shells during the clashes.
- On May 4, 2011, a ceasefire was agreed upon, and the border was re-opened for trade.
- On May 5, 2011, Thai Prime Minister Abhisit Vejjajiva made it clear that he would not allow any international troops at Preah Vihear, unless Cambodia withdrew its forces from the disputed territory. He claimed the presence of troops in the area was a violation of the 2000 memorandum of understanding between Thailand and Cambodia.
- On May 7, 2011, Thailand and Cambodia agreed to appoint Indonesia as observers at the disputed border.

===== July =====
- Following a request from Cambodia to order Thai troops out of the area, the judges of the International Court of Justice, by a vote of 11–5, ordered both countries to immediately to withdraw their military forces from disputed areas straddling their border and imposed restrictions on both their armies and police forces. A "provisional demilitarized zone" would make Thai troops leave positions they have long occupied and Cambodia's to leave the temple's immediate vicinity. The court also called for officers from the Association of Southeast Asian Nations (ASEAN) to be allowed into the area to observe the cease-fire as called for by the UN Security Council last February.
- Both sides said they were satisfied with the decision. Thai Foreign Minister Kasit, speaking outside the court, said that a withdrawal of armed Cambodians from the temple complex "has been our consistent position." Further noting that the decision is binding on both countries, he added that Thailand would withdraw its forces and facilitate the observers' deployment, and further agreed to allow unhindered supplies to Cambodian civilian personnel at the temple complex.
- Cambodian Foreign Minister Hor Namhong said a demilitarised zone would mean "a permanent ceasefire...tantamount to a cessation of aggression" by Thailand. He also said he was satisfied with the dispatch of truce observers, which he said Cambodia had been seeking since last February, but made no reference to the demand for Cambodian troops to abandon the temple grounds.
- The court said its ruling would not prejudice any final ruling on where the border in the area between Thailand and Cambodia should fall. It could take the court many months or even years to reach that decision.
- Abhisit, caretaker prime minister since the just-concluded Thai general election, said that Thai soldiers would not pull out of the disputed area until the military of both countries agreed on the mutual withdrawal. "We need to talk to the Cambodians as the Cambodians also have to pull out their troops," Abhisit said at a news conference in Bangkok. "So there has to be some kind of mechanism to verify, to do it in an orderly manner. And therefore it depends on the two sides to come together and talk," he said, suggesting that an existing joint border committee would be the appropriate place to plan a coordinated pullback.
- On July 23, 2011, one Cambodian soldier was killed along the Cambodian-Thai border while another was wounded. A local military commander stated that the soldier's death was a result of clashes provoked by Thai troops. Pok Sophal, a commander for Oddar Meanchey's Trapaing Prasat district, stated that, "We had an appointment for the meeting [between the two sides], and when we were walking, they opened fire at our soldiers". Thai spokesman Phay Siphan stated that the government was investigating the incident, but dismissed claims of armed clashes.

===== December =====
- On December 15, 2011, armies of both sides exchanged gunfire along the border in Koh Kong Province. The armed clash erupted at 13:45 in Zone 329 in Ta Min mountain after a Thai helicopter tried to land in Cambodian territory. No injuries or deaths were reported. The source said the Cambodian soldiers opened fire to prevent the Thai helicopter entering Cambodia and that the Thai soldiers responded with heavy gunfire. It was the first armed clash since Thailand's new government was formed in August.
- On December 21, 2011, Cambodia and Thailand agreed to withdraw their troops from a disputed border area near Preah Vihear.

== Proceedings at the International Court of Justice ==
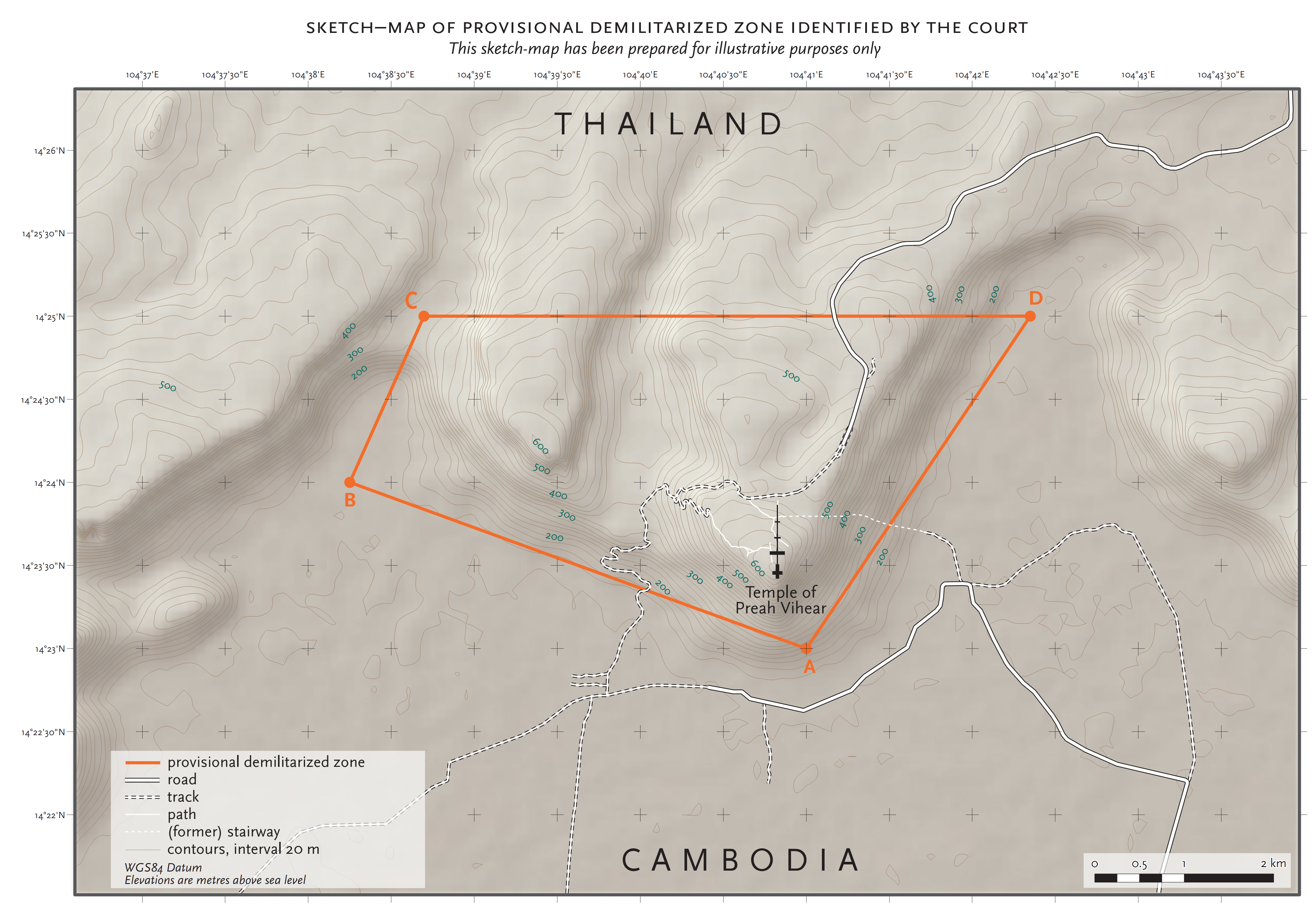
Provisional demilitarized zone pursuant to the Order of 18 July 2011

On 28 April 2011 Cambodia filed a request for interpretation of the 1962 judgment, as well as a request for the indication of provisional measures, in the Registry of the International Court of Justice. On 18 July 2011 the court rejected Thailand's attempt to have the case dismissed and indicated provisional measures requiring both states to withdraw their soldiers from a "provisional demilitarized zone" containing the area in dispute and some of its environs, continue their co-operation with ASEAN and observers appointed by it, and refrain from doing anything that might "aggravate or extend the dispute". It also ordered Thailand not to obstruct Cambodia's access to the Preah Vihear.

On 11 November 2013 the International Court of Justice gave judgment, ruling that the 1962 judgment awarded all of the promontory to Cambodia and ordering the withdrawal of Thai soldiers. This followed a tense buildup to the decision in which dozens of Thai schools had closed ahead of the ruling.

The court first concluded that it had jurisdiction and the request for interpretation was admissible, finding that a "dispute exists between the Parties as to the meaning and scope of the 1962 judgment pursuant to Article 60 of the Statute [of the ICJ]." The court said that the 1962 judgment had three important features: it involved an issue of "territorial sovereignty...and that it was not engaged in delimiting the frontier"; the "Annex I map played a central role in the reasoning of the Court..."; and that it made clear that it was only dealing with the small area in the "region of the Temple of Preah Vihear". The court unanimously declared:

The Court therefore concludes that the first operative paragraph of the 1962 Judgment determined that Cambodia had sovereignty over the whole territory of the promontory of Preah Vihear, as defined in paragraph 98 of the present Judgment, and that, in consequence, the second operative paragraph required Thailand to withdraw from that territory the Thai military or police forces, or other guards or keepers, that were stationed there.

However, the court rejected Cambodia's argument that Phnom Trap had also been awarded to it by the 1962 judgment, concluding that the reference to the "vicinity" of Preah Vihear in the operative part of the 1962 judgment was not intended to extend to it. Phnom Trap, known by Thais as Phu Ma-khuea (ภูมะเขือ, "Solanum Hill"), is the hill three kilometers northwest of the temple and comprises over 4 km^{2} of the "4.6 square km" that both states agreed was in dispute.

Prior to the verdict, hundreds of Thai villagers left the area in expectation of the ruling to be unfavorable to them. There were also fears of renewed clashes amid rising nationalist rhetoric.

== Civilian effects ==
After the initial attack on 4 February 2011, the Cambodian army fired BM-21 Grad rockets into the town of Sao Thong Chai about 5 kilometres (3.1 mi) from the border. As a direct result, primary schools, a local hospital, and four or five houses were destroyed. Only minutes before the bombardment, the local authority had issued a warning to the locals to evacuate and close the school. Despite this, 3 civilians were killed and at least 34 were injured in the rocket attack.

There are reports that 22,000 Thai citizens had to evacuate and abandon their homes. The Cambodian government blamed the Thai army for firing onto the World Heritage temple, causing severe damage, whereas the Cambodian army settled the site as an army base. There is evidence, such as video and photo footage from Reuters, showing that Cambodian forces used the temple as a military base and fired machine guns and artillery. Thai soldiers responded by firing rifles at the Cambodian soldiers hiding in the temple. However, there are only a few bullet impacts visible on the temple. The Associated Press reported that Cambodian troops were stationed in the temple.

The Thai army was accused of using cluster munitions against Cambodia during the border fighting in February. Thailand at first denied the allegation, but later admitted it had fired the weapons. According to the Cluster Munition Coalition, thousands of Cambodian villagers are now at risk of death or serious injury because of unexploded ordnance near their homes.

== Reactions ==
=== International ===
Many Asian nations, including Indonesia, Malaysia, the Philippines, Japan, China, and Vietnam, as well as Canada, Russia, United Kingdom, and United States, have called on both sides to exercise restraint. Thailand and Cambodia agreed to allow Indonesian monitors to go to the border between the two countries to help prevent further military clashes; Indonesia was appointed as observer in this dispute.

=== Local ===
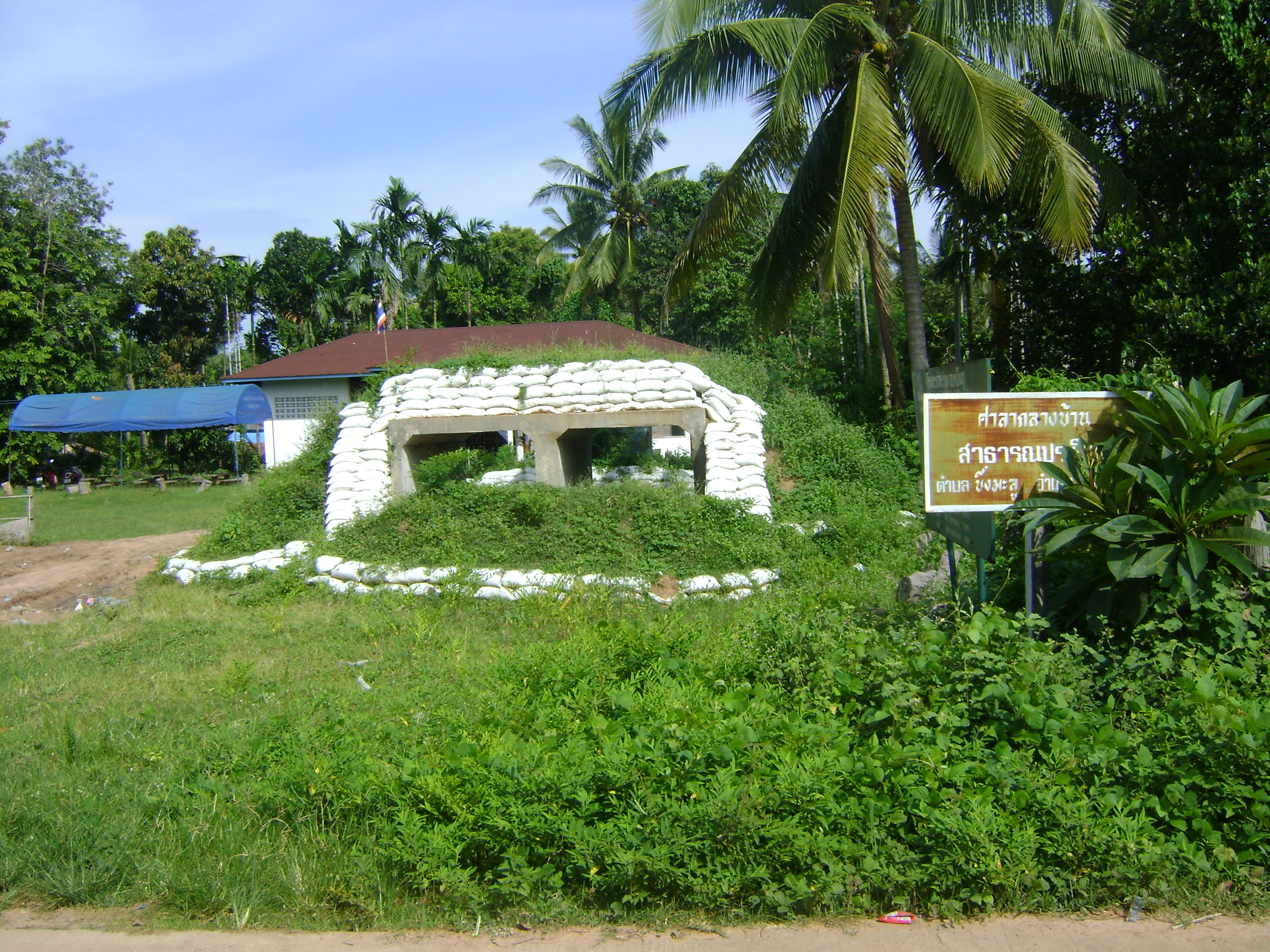
An improvised village bunker in Ban Si Sa At, Sisaket Province

Despite the 1976 Treaty of Amity and Cooperation in Southeast Asia, which commits parties to resolve intrastate conflict without violence, and the 2000 Memorandum of Understanding between Cambodia and Thailand, which established a Joint Border Commission to peacefully resolve overlapping claims, important constituent groups in Thailand, including the "Yellow Shirts," maintain that the status of Preah Vihear remains unresolved.

Villagers from Ban Phum Srol denounced plans by the People's Alliance for Democracy (PAD) ("Yellow Shirts") to bring relief supplies. Wichit Duangkaew, then 46, said, "You have created the war. You troubled us. We don't welcome you."

Police arrested a Thai, a Cambodian, and a Vietnamese in Thai Sisaket's Kantharalak District, near the Thai-Cambodian border. The suspects carried maps with military bases marked on them, but they denied they were spying.

According to Michael Montesano, a visiting research fellow on Thai history and regional affairs at the Institute of Southeast Asian Studies in Singapore, "They're people who say that Hun Sen's playing up the situation on the Thai border is a way to distract the Cambodian people from his much softer stance vis à vis Vietnam relating to poorly demarcated borders."

== See also ==
- 2025 Cambodian-Thai border crisis
- Elections in Cambodia
- Elections in Thailand
- Cambodia–Thailand border
- Khao Phra Wihan National Park – the Thai side
- Irredentism for the principle involved
- Thai–Laotian Border War

Similar articles:

- Goguryeo controversies
- Nanyue controversies
- Karelian question
