= Nitya Pibulsonggram =

Thai diplomat and politician (1941-2014)

- นิตย์ พิบูลสงคราม
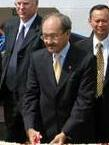
- Nitya in 2007

Minister of Foreign Affairs
- In office 9 October 2006 – 6 February 2008
- Prime Minister: Surayud Chulanont
- Preceded by: Kantathi Suphamongkhon
- Succeeded by: Noppadon Pattama

Personal details
- Born: 30 June 1941 Bangkok, Thailand
- Died: 24 May 2014 (aged 72) Bangkok, Thailand
- Spouse: Patcharin Pibulsonggram
- Parents: Plaek Phibunsongkhram (father); La-iad Bhandhukravi (mother)
- Education: Dartmouth College; Brown University
- Profession: Diplomat; politician

Nitya Pibulsonggram (Thai: นิตย์ พิบูลสงคราม, RTGS: Nit Phibunsongkhram, June 30, 1941 – May 24, 2014) was a Thai career diplomat and politician.

== Careers and education ==
After receiving his B.A. in government from Dartmouth College and his M.A. in political science from Brown University, he joined Thailand's Foreign Service in 1968. Between 1996 and 2000 he was ambassador Extraordinary and Plenipotentiary of Thailand to the United States and then few years later, he became Thailand's Ambassador and Permanent Representative to the United Nation in New York. He served briefly as the Thai Ministry of Foreign Affairs' Permanent Secretary (the most senior civil servant of the Ministry) before retiring from bureaucratic career.

After his retirement, he served as advisor to the foreign minister and as Thailand's chief negotiator for a Thai-US free trade agreement negotiations.

In 2006 he was appointed by the military junta to be Foreign Minister of Thailand, serving in that post until early 2008.

At Dartmouth College, Nitya Pibulsonggram was a member of Kappa Kappa Kappa society class of 1962.

== Family ==
He was the sixth child of Field Marshal Plaek Phibunsongkhram and Than Phu Ying La-iad Bhandhukravi with three sisters and two brothers. One of them, Prasong, was a Vice-Admiral who had served under the Royal Thai Armed Forces.

== Death ==
Nitya died of a stroke from leukemia on 24 May 2014, he was 72 years old.
