= Prasat Ta Muen Thom =

11th-century Khmer Hindu temple on the Cambodia-Thailand border

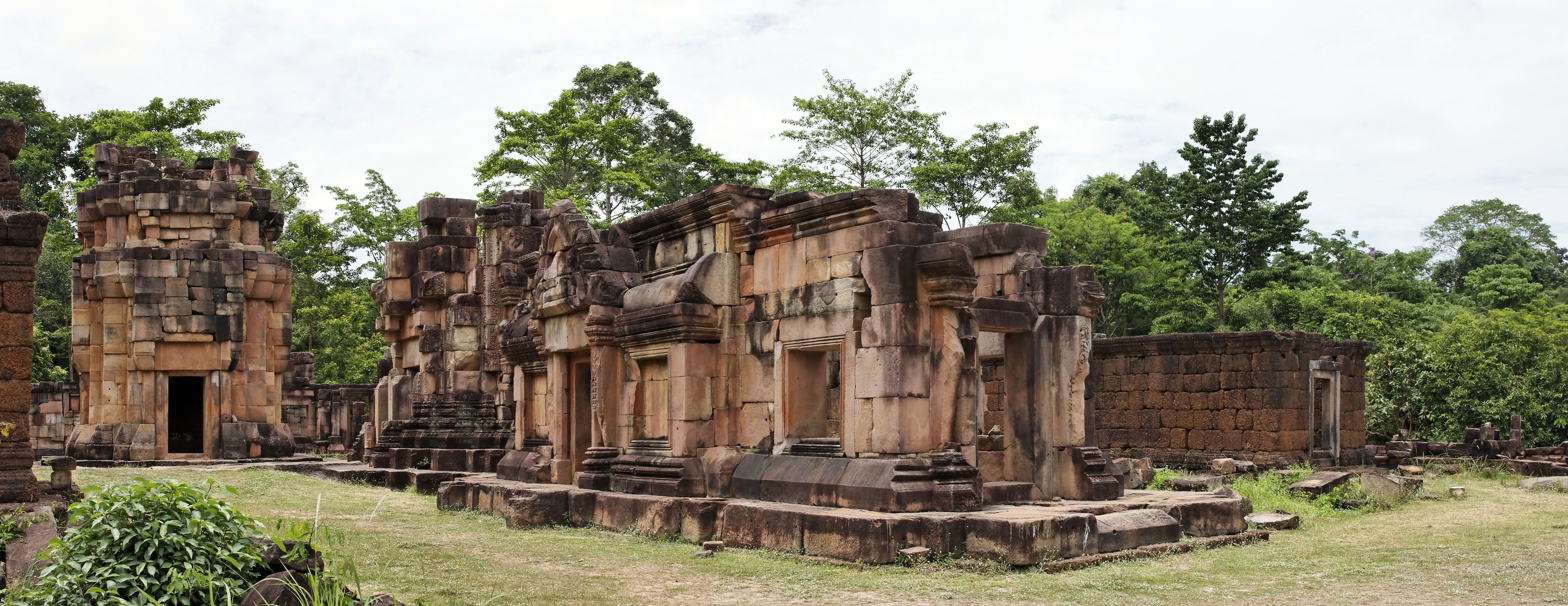

Religion
- Affiliation: Hinduism
- Deity: Shiva

Location
- Location: Cambodia–Thailand border
- Interactive map of Prasat Ta Muen Thom
- Coordinates: 14.3493°N 103.2666°E

Architecture
- Type: Khmer
- Creator: Udayadityavarman II
- Completed: 11th century

Prasat Ta Muen Thom (Thai: ปราสาทตาเมือนธม, RTGS: Prasat Ta Muean Thom, pronounced [prāːsàːt tāː mɯ̄a̯n tʰōm]) or Prasat Ta Moan Thom (Khmer: ប្រាសាទតាមាន់ធំ, romanized: Prasat Ta Moan Thom; Literally: Castle of Grandfather Chicken), is an ancient Khmer-Hindu temple near the Cambodia–Thailand border.

It lies not far from two related temples in a densely forested area where access is difficult on one of the passes through the Dangrek Mountains. Prasat Ta Muen Toch ("Minor Temple of Grandfather Chicken"), the hospital chapel, lies two and half kilometers to the northwest and just 300 meters beyond that is the rest house chapel, Prasat Ta Muen ("Temple of Grandfather Chicken"). During the 1980s-90s, when the Khmer Rouge of the Democratic Kampuchea controlled the area, the temples in the region were looted by the Khmer Rouge to finance their guerrilla campaign. Many architectural pieces and original sculptures were stolen, sometimes detached using dynamite, and smuggled out of Cambodia or sold on the black market. These three temples, all within a few hundred meters of each other, formed a complex which was an important stop on a major route of the Khmer Empire, the Ancient Khmer Highway from its capital at Angkor to its major administrative center in the northwest, Phimai (now in Thailand).

== Layout ==
The temple is located in the Ta Muen Thom pass at the top of the escarpment of the Dangrek Mountains which forms the current border between Cambodia and Thailand in the region fenced with wireframe but was released out of the poles about 2011. North of the border is the Khorat Plateau while to the south are divided the two countries with long cliffs as the mountains form sheer drops down to the plains connected to Northwest of Cambodia. Ta Muen Thom was written in Kui language as Taa-Mian Phued, which means "Big (structures) named after Taa-Mian. The construction in former times where the Elephant-Kui were used for going for living and catching elephants from the lower land, so-called "Katae Khmaerrrr" กะแต๊ะขแมรรรร constructed of laterite and laid out in a rectangular plan with the entrance facing south, highly unusual for Khmer temples which usually face east. It is suspected that this is due to the topography, both to meet travelers having just climbed the pass from the plains below and to provide a defensible position with a strategic view southward down the mountains. The temple's enclosure is 46 meters by 38 meters with its center in a central sanctuary constructed of pinkish-grey sandstone and preceded by a mandapa and an antarala. A natural channel in the bedrock was used as the somasutra, a funnel which transported holy water used in rituals from the statue in the main chamber, which flows out from the garbhagriha and indicates the relative importance of the site.

On the north side are two towers and two other laterite buildings that are still standing as well as the foundations of three other buildings which are no longer standing. These buildings are the remains of the highway rest house and hospital Jayavarman VII erected to add to the temple complex where pilgrims and travelers would spend the night and recuperate for the next leg of their journey. On the south facade, the same side as the main entrance, is the main Gopura, which is much larger than the others. A large broad steep laterite staircase, also facing south and extending well down into Cambodian territory, leads to the entrance of the temple. There is also a laterite staircase that leads down to a stream on the Cambodian side which curves around the temple. The orientation of Ta Muen Thom is very similar to that of Prasat Hin Phimai and others at Phimai Historical Park.

Recent excavations inside the main tower have revealed the existence of a natural linga protruding from the top of the hill around which the temple was built. There is a similar natural linga at the Khmer temple Vat Phou in Laos.

== Access ==
During the 2008–2013 Cambodian–Thai border crisis which was primarily centered around ownership of Preah Vihear, border clashes spread to Ta Muen and access to the temple was temporarily closed. Afterwards, tensions remain high and tourists at the temple are not allowed to venture more than a few meters southward from the main entrance and armed Thai border police stand guard to mark the border.

In 2010, the entrance of Ta Muen Thom temple on the Cambodia side was made more accessible with a 24 km red gravel (later upgraded to asphalt) road and a steep 500-meter concrete road leading to the temple.

== Gallery ==
Prasat Ta Muen Thom
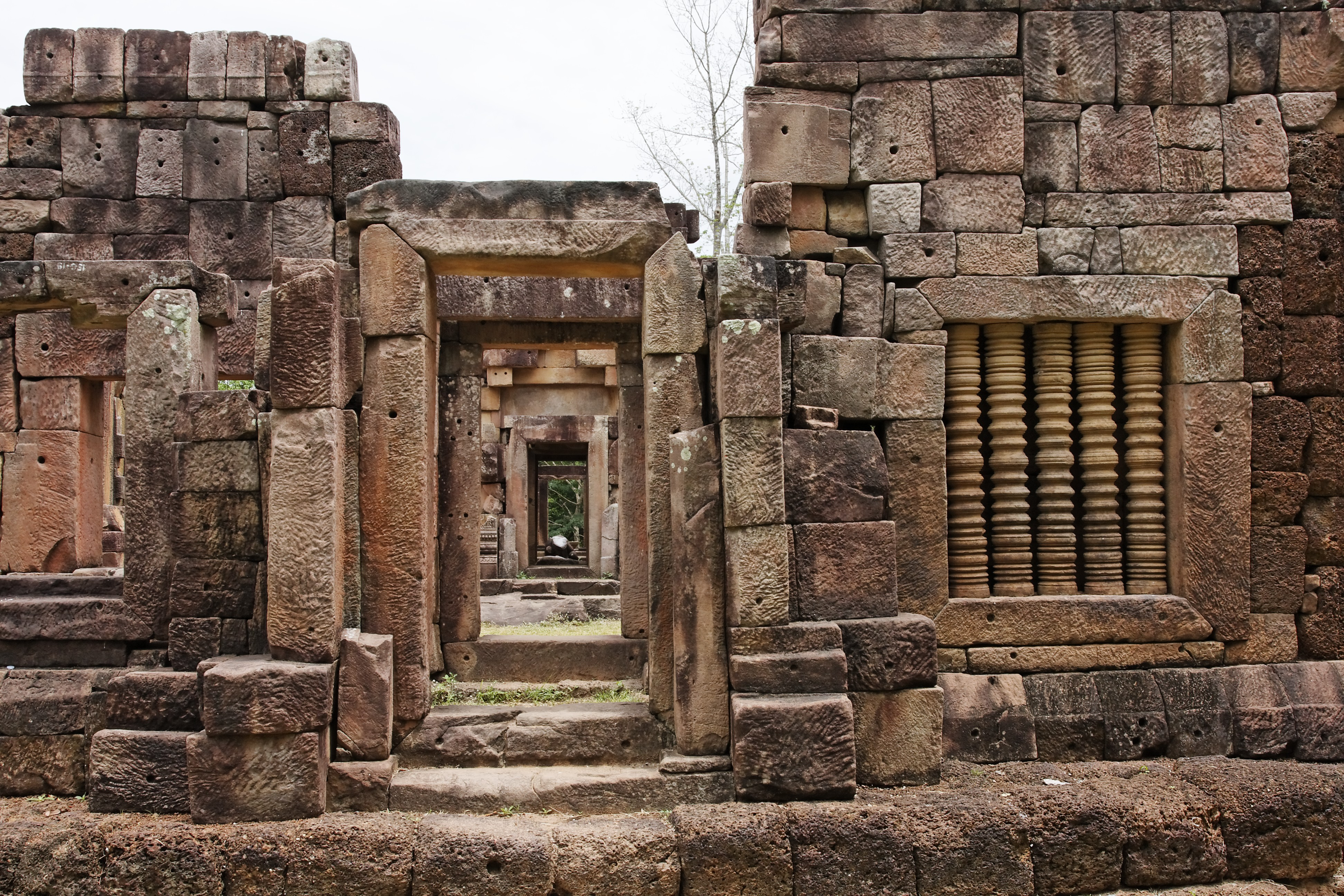

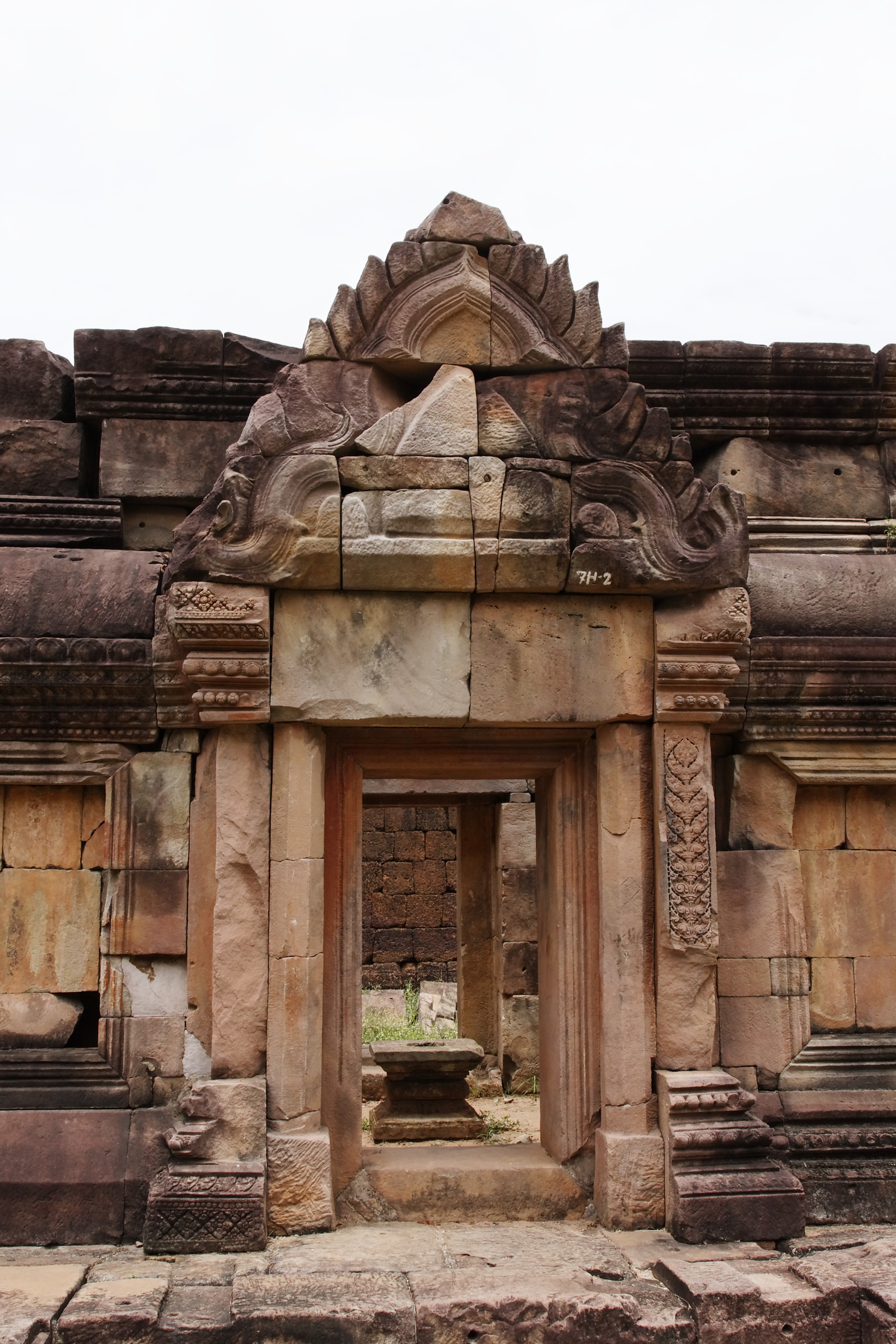

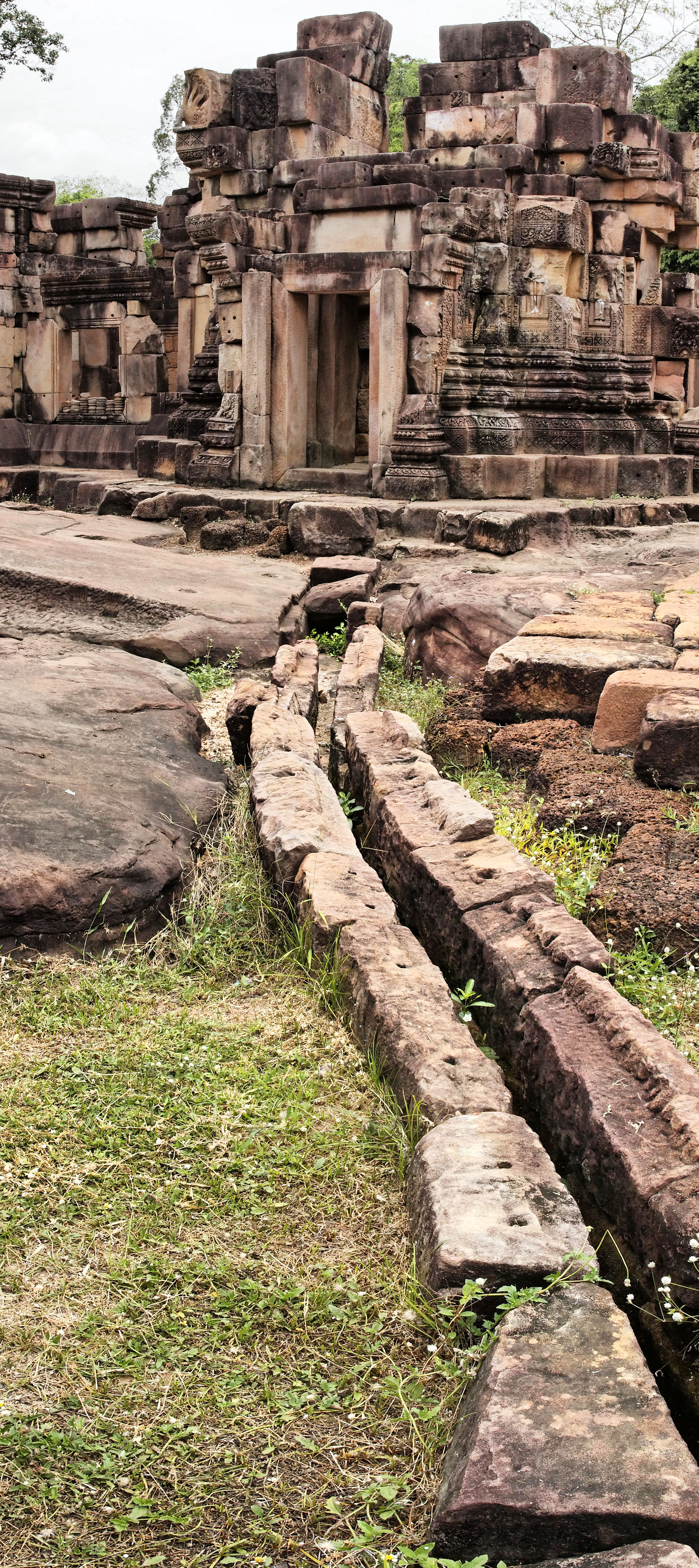
The somasutra.

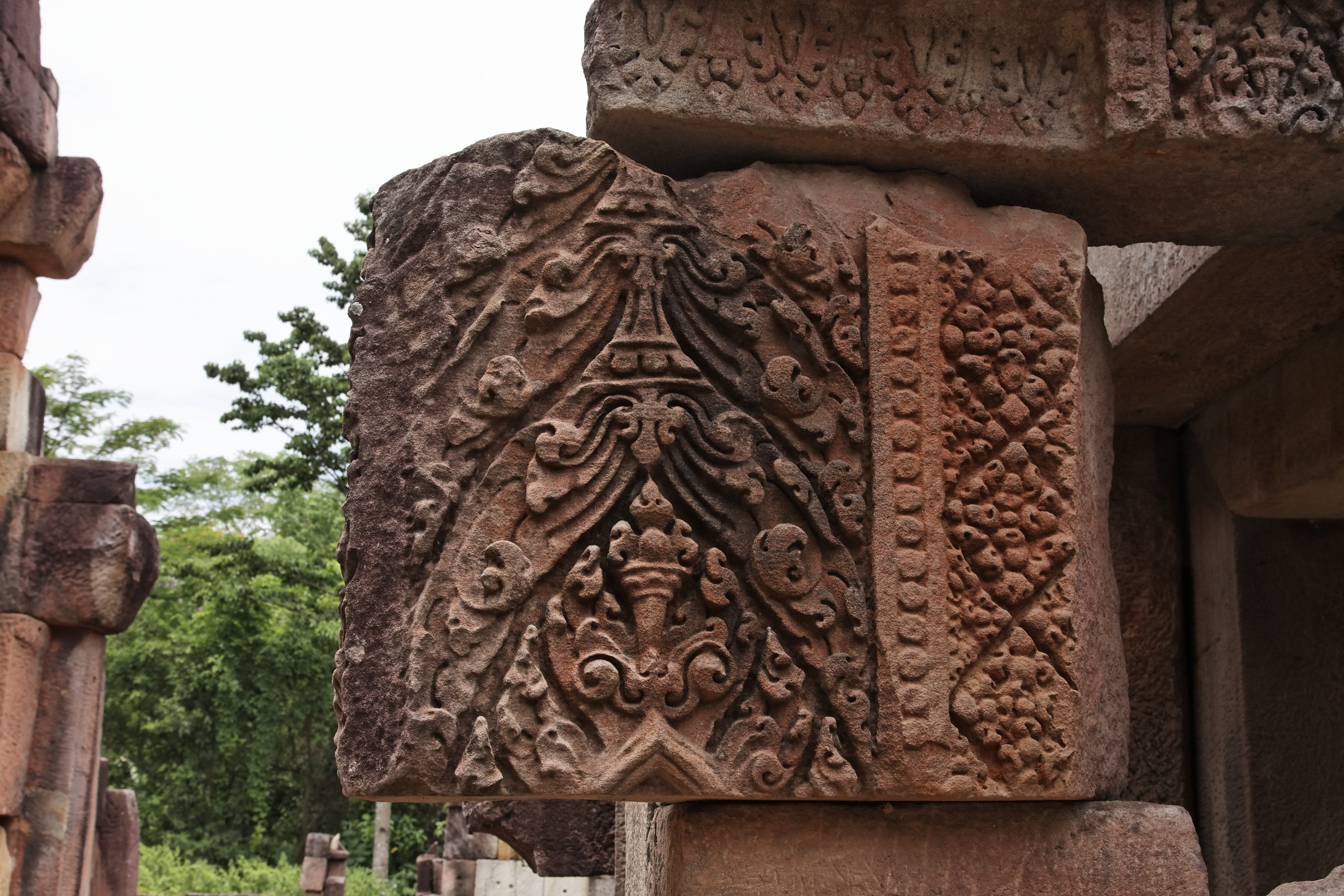

== See also ==
- Prasat Ta Khwai
