= Noppadon Pattama =

- นพดล ปัทมะ
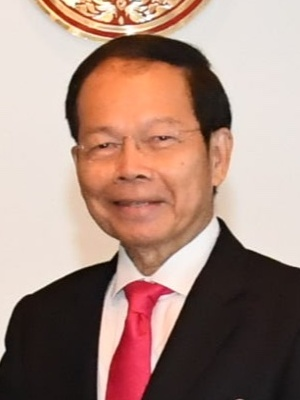

Minister of Foreign Affairs
- In office 6 February 2008 – 14 July 2008
- Prime Minister: Samak Sundaravej
- Preceded by: Nitya Pibulsonggram
- Succeeded by: Tej Bunnag

Personal details
- Born: April 23, 1961 (age 65) Nakhon Ratchasima, Thailand
- Party: Democrat (before 2006); Thai Rak Thai (2006); People's Power (2007–2008); Pheu Thai (2008–2025)
- Education: Thammasat University; University of London; University of Oxford
- Profession: Professor; diplomat; politician

Noppadon Pattama (Thai: นพดล ปัทมะ, RTGS: Nopphadon Patthama; born April 23, 1961) is a Thai politician who served as Foreign Minister of Thailand in the cabinet of Prime Minister Samak Sundaravej. He is a former member of Samak's People's Power Party and its successor, the Pheu Thai Party, as well as a former legal adviser to Thaksin Shinawatra, who was deposed as prime minister by the September 2006 military coup.

== Early life and education ==
Noppadon was born in Nakhon Ratchasima and educated at Thammasat University, Bangkok, where he graduated top of his class in law in 1982 and won a Fulbright scholarship to study in the United States.

After receiving a prestigious Ananda Mahidol Scholarship, however, he chose instead to study at King's College, University of London (LL.M. 1990) and the University of Oxford (MA 1992). He was the President of the Thai Students’ Association in Britain from 1988–1989. While in Britain, he met Chuan Leekpai, leader of the Democrat Party, who became his political patron.

== Political career ==
Returning to Thailand, Noppadon practised law in Bangkok and became Chuan's secretary during his period as Leader of the Opposition from 1995–97. Elected as a Democrat Party Member of Parliament in 1996, he became a member of the Parliament of Thailand's Standing Committee on Foreign Affairs, and when Chuan became prime minister in 1997, he became an influential figure. He was Parliamentary Secretary to Foreign Minister Surin Pitsuwan from 1999–2001.

Chuan's government was defeated at the 2001 election, and Noppadon was not re-elected to Parliament and returned to his law practice. In May 2006, he defected to Thaksin's Thai Rak Thai party, and was briefly Vice Minister of Natural Resources and Environment in Thaksin's government before it was deposed in the September coup. His defection was engineered by Thaksin's Natural Resources and Environment minister, Yongyuth Tiyapairat, also a former Democrat MP. He maintains he defected for "ideological reasons" and not for personal gain.

In November 2006, Thaksin, who was in exile following the coup, appointed Noppadon as his legal adviser, in matters relating both to his status in Thailand and his business affairs in Britain and elsewhere. In this capacity, Noppadon defended Thaksin against the National Counter Corruption Commission (NCCC), which had alleged that Thaksin's purchase of the Manchester City Football Club showed that he was concealing assets allegedly gained through corruption while in office. He challenged the NCCC to examine Thaksin's asset statements, arguing that the purchase of the club was not financed by hidden wealth. He argued that Thaksin financed the purchase with "honest earnings" and that Thaksin was "not obliged" to declare funds held by his adult children, relatives and close associates.

In 2007 Noppadon became a member of Samak's new People's Power Party, which is generally regarded as the successor to Thai Rak Thai. As an adviser to Thaksin, he acted as a link between Thaksin in exile and the People's Power leadership in Thailand. Soon after taking office, he expressed his view that Thaksin's diplomatic passport, revoked after the coup, should be restored. He also expressed the view that Thaksin would return to Thailand, where he faces corruption charges, "before May."

Samak Sundaravej's 5-month-old government ran into trouble on July 10, 2008 after Noppadon Pattama, as 3rd top official in the ruling People Power Party (PPP) resigned, effective Monday. Its deputy leader Yongyut Tiyapairat, was banned from politics for 5 years, after the Supreme Court affirmed vote buying charges against him. Then, Chiya Sasomsub was removed from office by another top court, for illegally concealing his wife's assets.

The Constitutional Court ruled on July 8 that Noppadon and the entire cabinet violated the charter by failing to ask parliamentary approval for a deal with Cambodia. Noppadon signed the agreement on June, to support Cambodia's bid to seek World Heritage status for the 900-year-old temple of Preah Vihear. The Opposition filed a petition with deputy Senate Speaker Nikom Wairatpanit to impeach Noppadon Pattama over Preah Vihear Temple issue because he violated the laws by not seeking congress's approval before signing over Preah Vihear to Cambodia causing Thailand to lose the land. Sathit Wongnongtoei submitted 141 signatures of MPs. Noppadon was accused of violating Article 190 and 270 of the Constitution. The Opposition filed the motion before Noppadon stepped down.

In 2025, Noppadon resigned from the Pheu Thai Party amid internal turmoil following Prime Minister Paetongtarn Shinawatra's removal from office, citing a desire to "pursue his legal career and contribute to the country."
