= Rajabhakti Park =

Park in Hua Hin, Thailand

Coordinates: 12°30′3.6″N 99°57′59.8″E

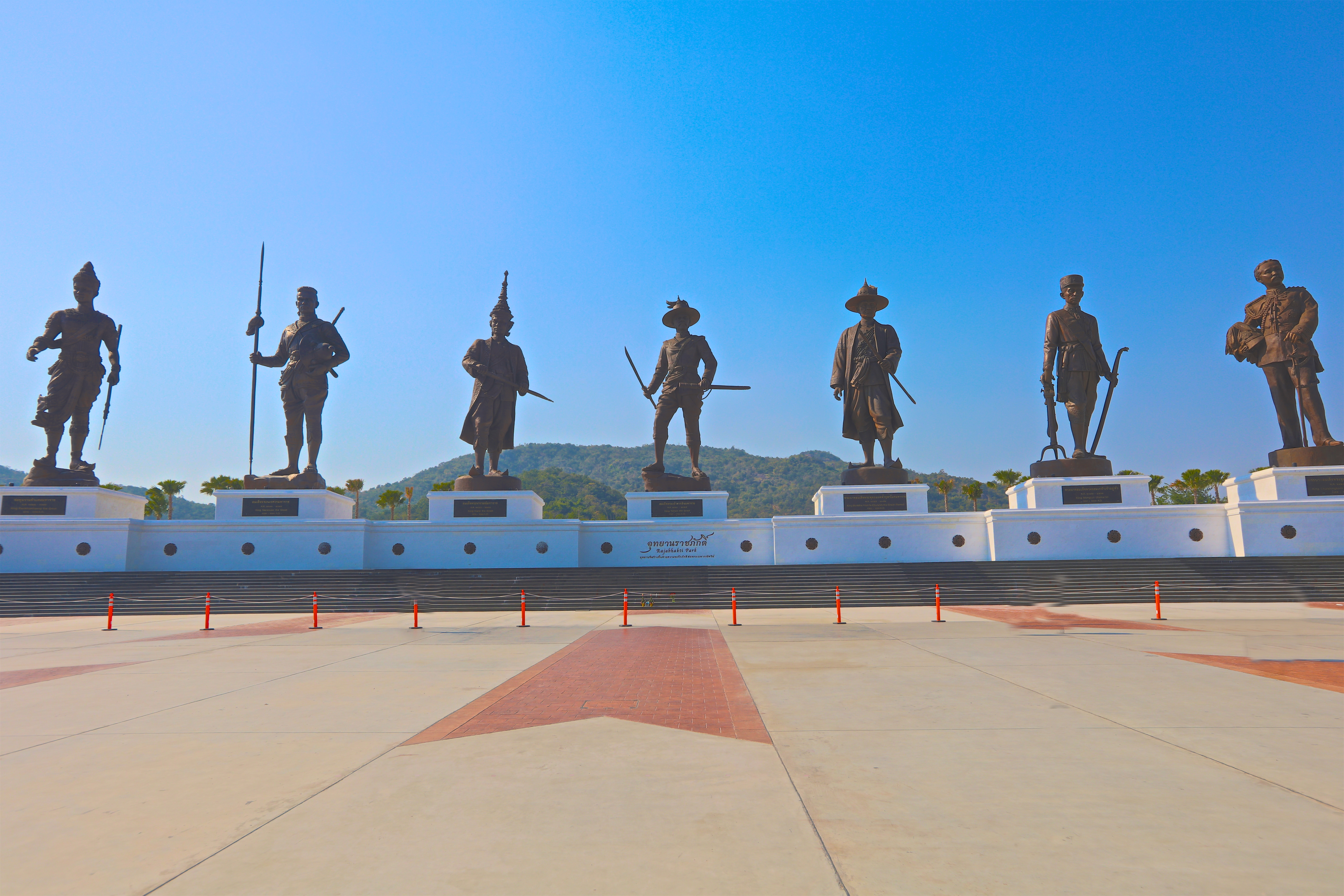
Bronze statues of seven Thai kings, Rajabhakti Park

Rajabhakti Park (Thai: อุทยานราชภักดิ์, RTGS: Utthayan Ratchaphak, pronounced [ʔùt.tʰā.jāːn râːt.t͡ɕʰā.pʰák]) is a historically themed park honouring past Thai kings from the Sukhothai period to the current royal house of Chakri. It is in Hua Hin, Prachuap Khiri Khan Province, Thailand. It was built by the Royal Thai Army, on Thai Army property, with approximately one billion baht (US$28 million) in funds donated by the public and private sectors. King Bhumibol Adulyadej gave the historical park the name "Rajabhakti Park", which means 'the park that has been built with people's loyalty to the monarchs'. The park occupies an area of 222 rai (355,200 m^{2} or 36 ha).

== Background ==
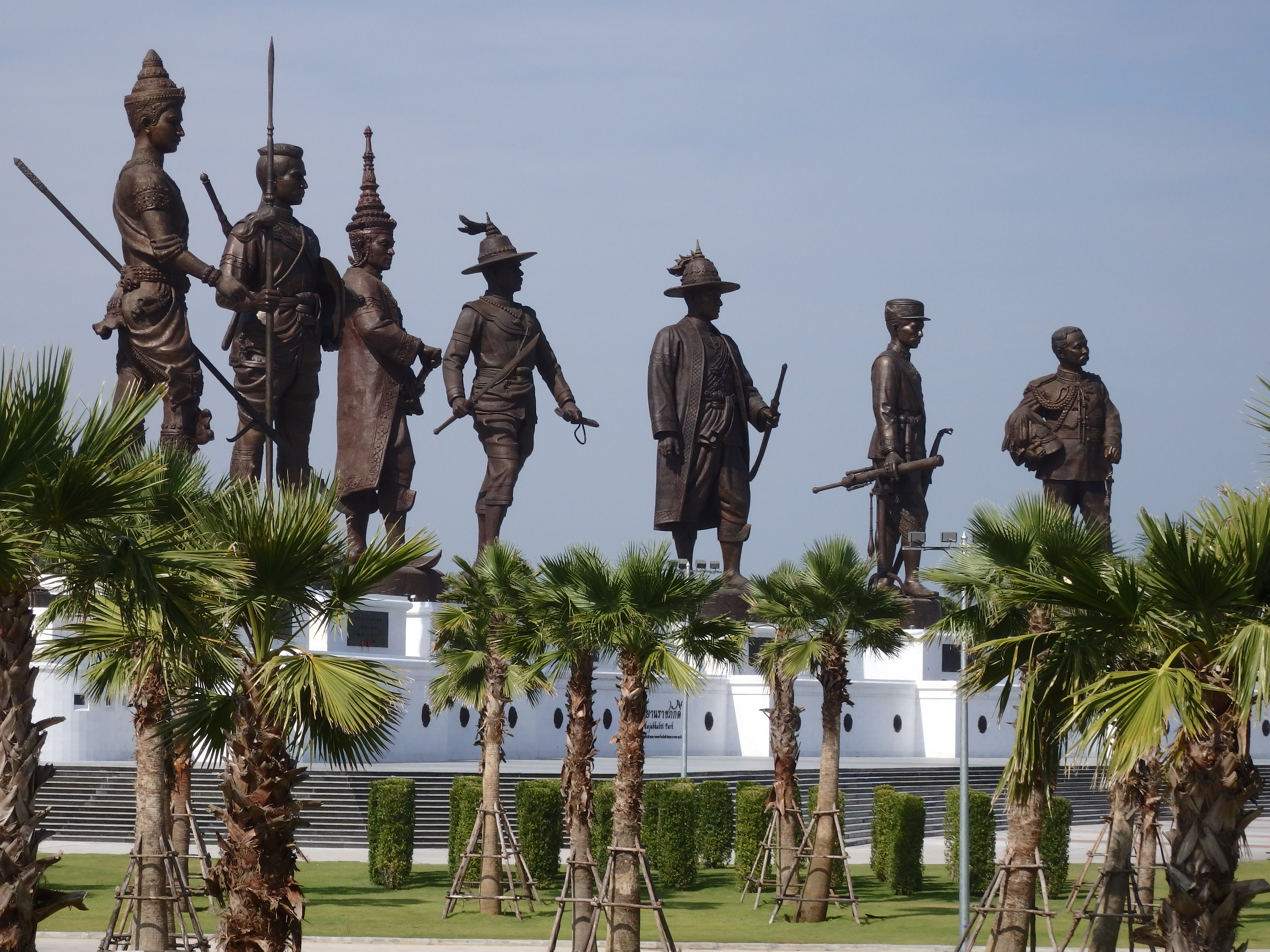
Seven kings, Rajabhakti Park

The Rajabhakti Park project was launched as a Royal Thai Army (RTA) initiative by General Udomdej Sitabutr when he was the army chief prior to his retirement at the end of September 2015. The Rajabhakti Park Foundation was established to raise funds for the project and to manage it.

Crown Prince Maha Vajiralongkorn, accompanied by his daughter, Princess Bajrakitiyabha, presided over the park's opening ceremonies on 26 September 2015.

== Park layout ==
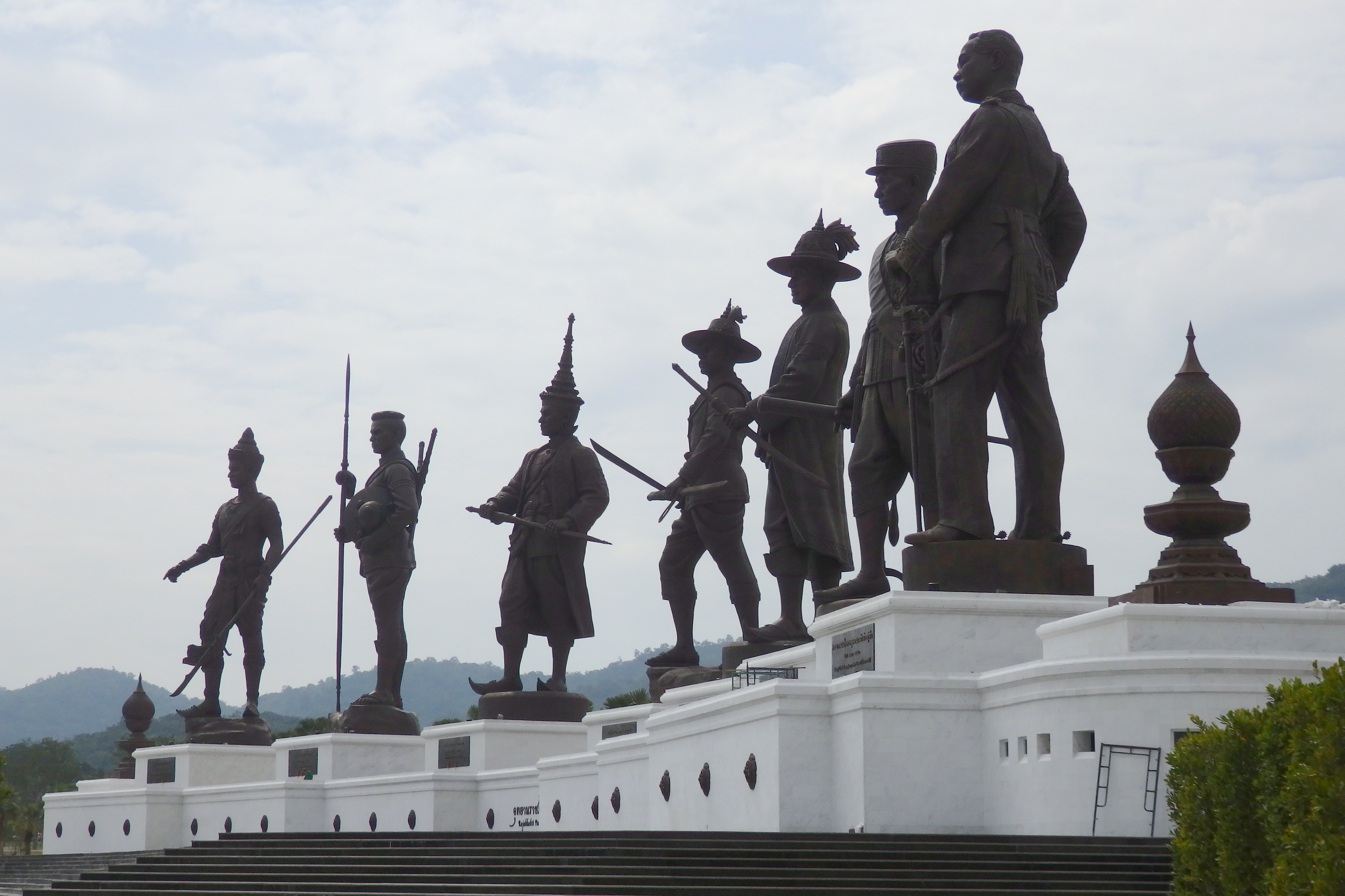
Kings, Rajabhakti Park

The park consists of three distinct areas. The first, covering an area of five rai (8,000 m^{2}), is dominated by the statues of seven notable Thai kings. They are King Ram Khamhaeng (reigned 1279-1298) of the Sukhothai period, King Naresuan (1590-1605) and King Narai (1656-1688) of the Ayutthaya period, King Taksin (1767-1782) of the Thonburi period, and King Rama I (1782-1809), King Mongkut (1851-1868), and King Chulalongkorn (1868-1910) of the Rattanakosin period. Each statue is made of bronze, with an average height of 13.9 meters. They were designed by Thailand's Fine Arts Department. Casting of the statues and construction of the multi-purpose plaza took 10 months, from November 2014 to August 2015. There are plans to add statues of two additional kings in the future.

The base of the statues is 134 m long, 43 m wide, and 8 m high. It houses the park's second component, a museum of Thai history, focusing in particular on the biographies and achievements of the seven kings on display.

The park's large plaza of 91 rai (145,600 m^{2}), is to be used by the Royal Thai Armed Forces for parades, ceremonies welcoming foreign dignitaries, and other special events. The park's peripheral area of 126 rai (201,600 m^{2}) consists of the surrounding landscape and support facilities.

== Controversy ==
In early-November 2015, anonymous Royal Thai Army officials complained to the Thai media about allegedly dodgy dealings related to park funding and procurement, followed by official denial that any public funding was involved. Of concern were seemingly high prices for land, equipment, and construction. There were also rumours of a middleman, later identified as Watcharapong Radomsittipat, who cited his connection to "people in authority" to demand commission fees from the owners of the foundries contracted to fabricate the statues. He was said to have demanded 10 percent kickbacks from each of the foundries commissioned to cast the bronze statues, reported to cost about 40 million baht (US$1.1 million) each. What followed was a deluge of stories about the park and questioning official efforts to derail the controversy. "The [park] has been a public relations disaster for the junta, which said cleaning up corruption was one of its major reasons for seizing power.">

=== Allegations ===
What was alleged in the Thai press focused primarily on the substantial kickbacks solicited for foundry contracts, but soon other shady dealings were alleged:

- Irregularities in the production and sale of 27,000 fundraising "Rajabhakti Bike & Concert" tee shirts. The shirts are alleged to have been sold for 11.9 million baht while costing 6 million baht. The remaining 5.9 million baht was allegedly transferred to the private bank account of an army officer.
- Palm trees planted at the park cost as much as 100,000 baht each and one donor was charged 300,000 baht to have his name placed on a tree.
- Park fundraising events included a Chinese banquet which charged 500,000 baht (US$15,625) a table and seating at the VIP table for one million baht (US$31,250).
- Overall lack of fiscal transparency including official denial that state funds were spent on the park, when in reality 63.57 million baht (US$2 million) from the treasury was used "...on levelling land at the construction site,...".

=== Key players ===
- Amulet trader: Watcharapong Radomsittipat, who allegedly demanded and received kickbacks from statue foundries. He was thought to have fled to Hong Kong. He was cleared of wrongdoing in February 2016.
- Col Khachachart Boondee: Named deputy commander of the King's Guard by Gen Udomdej following the 2014 coup. Col Khachachart was tasked by Gen Udomdej with retrieving commissions from the amulet trader. Linked to alleged park corruption, he is thought to have fled to Myanmar.
- Defence Minister Prawit Wongsuwan: Ordered a defense ministry probe after the army's review "...proceeded too quickly and facilely, was entirely opaque on every important point and failed to answer key questions."
- Maj Gen Suchart Prommai: Named commander of the King's Guard by Gen Udomdej shortly after the 22 May 2014 coup, and later to an executive position in the park foundation. His whereabouts are unknown.
- Deputy Education Minister Gen Surachet Chaiwong: Deputy Chairman of the Rajabhakti Park Foundation. He represented the foundation in its dealings with the six foundries that cast the statues.
- Gen Theerachai Nakvanich: Assumed the role of Royal Thai Army (RTA) commander on 1 October 2015 following the retirement of his predecessor, Gen Udomdej Sitabutr. Gen Theerachai admitted that more than one billion baht had been donated to fund the project, but declared that no military officers were involved in the alleged corruption.
- Gen Udomdej Sitabutr: Deputy Defense Minister and former army chief, served as Chairman of the Rajabhakti Foundation.

=== Statues and kickbacks ===
Rajabhakti Park Statues, Costs, Commissions and Recipients Paid
Statue	Vendor	Location	Fabrication cost	Commission paid	Commission recipient
King Ram Khamhaeng	Chour Pratimakam Industry Co, Ltd	Nakhon Phanom	43 million baht	300,000 baht	Army colonel
King Naresuan	Asia Fine Art Co, Ltd	Ayutthaya	45 million baht	Unknown	Unknown
King Narai	Rocla Fine Art Co, Ltd	Lopburi	45.5 million baht	10 percent	Amulet trader Watcharapong Radomsittipat
King Taksin	Patima Fine Art Co, Ltd	Pathum Thani	45 million baht	10 percent	Amulet trader Watcharapong Radomsittipat
King Rama I	Phutthapatima Promrungsee Co, Ltd	Bangkok	43 million baht	4,788,800	Amulet trader Watcharapong Radomsittipat
King Rama IV	Asia Fine Art Co, Ltd	Ayutthaya	45 million baht	Unknown	Unknown
King Rama V	Phon Sculpture Group Co, Ltd	Bangkok	42 million baht	5,344,864 baht	Amulet trader Watcharapong Radomsittipat

=== Chronology ===
Date	Events
Nov 2014	Park construction begins
19 Aug 2015	Buddhist consecration of the park statues with Prime Minister Gen Prayut Chan-o-cha and other dignitaries in attendance.
12 Sep	• Princess Bajrakitiyabha hosts the "Rajabhakdi Bike and Concert", a fundraising event at the park. • Army chief Teerachai Nakwanich announces that the army will conduct a review of alleged graft in the park project.
26 Sep	Official park opening ceremony.
31 Oct	Col. Kachachat Boondee, charged with embezzlement of park funds, flees to Myanmar.
6 Nov	Amulet trader flees Thailand for Hong Kong.
7 Nov	Col Winthai Suwaree, a spokesman for the National Council for Peace and Order (NCPO), says that reports of Rajabhakti Park corruption are entirely false.
10 Nov	Gen Udomdej Sitabutr confirms that an amulet trader cited "people in authority" to demand commission fees from owners of foundries contracted to cast statues of historical kings for Rajabhakti Park.
12 Nov	• The army announces that it will undertake a review of the park project amid rising criticism.
16 Nov	• Defense Minister Gen Prawit Wongsuwan denies that public funds were used in the park project. He explained that the project was initiated by the army and paid for by donations. • National Anti-Corruption Commission (NACC) spokesman Wicha Mahakhun said that park construction was not funded by the state. • Prime Minister Prayut insisted that the National Council for Peace and Order (NCPO) was not involved in the project.
19 Nov	Police spokesman Piyapan Pingmuang said police cannot do anything about the alleged graft unless the military request them to do so.
20 Nov	• Army review of alleged graft in park project released. Conclusion: no irregularities found. • Auditor-General Pisit Leelavachiropas says there is no proof that public money was drawn from the central budget to fund the Rajabhakti Park project.
24 Nov	• Defence permanent secretary General Preecha Chan-o-cha is ordered by the defence minister to set up a fact-finding committee to probe alleged park irregularities. The new probe is separate from the one ordered by Army Commander-in-Chief General Theerachai Nakvanich which found the project transparent and free of corruption. • Defense Ministry spokesman, Maj Gen Kongeheep Tantravanich, says that anyone solicited for a kickback should lodge a complaint with the police.
28 Nov	Three governmental agencies—The Office of the Auditor-General, the NACC, and the Office of the Public Sector Anti-Corruption Commission—confirm that 63.57 million baht of taxpayer money was spent on the park project.
30 Nov	Red-shirt leaders Jatuporn Prompan and Nattawut Saikuar are arrested and detained by the army while on their way to visit the park.
1 Dec	The National Anti-Corruption Commission (NACC) holds off on setting up a committee to investigate irregularities in the army's Rajabhakti Park project because there is no clear evidence of corruption.
2 Dec	The defense ministry team investigating alleged Rajabhakti Park project irregularities will complete its work before year-end, according to its head.
3 Dec	Prime Minister Gen Prayut Chan-o-cha says that the Rajabhakti Park project might indeed be mired in irregularities.
7 Dec	• The Democracy Studies Group, a group of students, is intent to travel to Rajabhakti Park in a campaign to look into alleged corruption during park construction. Their leader, Sirawith Seritiwat, has called the trip "Taking a train to Rajabhakti Park to throw light on graft techniques". Government spokesman Maj-General Sansern Kaewkamnerd said officials would not stop the students going to the park because they had the liberty to travel anywhere. • Army troops intercepted a train carrying student activists to Hua Hin and disconnect their carriage from the train. • The Hua Hin police announce that the park will be closed for renovation on 7 December.
9 Dec	• Deputy junta chairman Prawit Wongsuwan cautioned reporters, "Don't ask too much about Rajabhakti. Ask something else. There's no point asking... Please stop mentioning this already. It damages confidence a lot. You're Thais, why do this? The government is working for the country. Therefore, the media must help us out." • Soldiers arrested a Facebook user for sharing an infographic about alleged park corruption.
30 Dec	A defense ministry panel reported on its investigation of park finances "under limited power" and were unable to find any wrongdoing. Gen Chaicharn Changmongkol, permanent secretary for defense, who headed the ministry's nine-member inquiry team, said the panel was authorised only to find facts about the project from defense ministry personnel and documents. The committee found that spending on the project complied with PM office and army regulations. The general said donations for the project amounted to 801 million baht: 732 million baht in cash donated by government agencies, the private sector, and fund-raising events, and 69 million baht in "donated objects". The production of the giant statues and metal flower tray models cost 318 million baht.
31 Dec	The Bangkok Post gave more detail about park funding as reported by the defence ministry fact-finding committee: the construction budget consisted of two components totalling 866 million baht. The first, about 63 million baht from the central governmental treasury, was spent on signage, flooring, and landscaping. The second portion consisted of 802 million baht in donations. It was spent on statues, drainage, and site preparation. A fund raising event, the "Rajabhakti Bike and Concert", held on 12 September in Hua Hin, raised 77 million baht, 76 million of which remains in the park welfare fund. The committee found that project spending "...followed regulations."
23 Mar 2016	The Public Sector Anti-Corruption Commission, appointed by the military regime to investigate allegations of corruption in the park's construction, concluded, following a three-month investigation, that no trace of corruption or malfeasance relating to the park was found.
16 Jun	The Executive Committee of Rajabhakti Park, mostly high-ranking army officers, asked Hua Hin Municipality to pay 120,000 baht per month for maintenance of the park.
8 Sep	The National Anti-Corruption Commission (NACC) declared the construction of Rajabhakti Park corruption-free. The agency's nine commissioners ruled unanimously that the construction process adhered strictly to official regulations.
