= Privy Council of Thailand =

Body of appointed advisors to the Monarchy of Thailand

- คณะองคมนตรีไทย khana ongkhamontri thai (th)

Agency overview
- Formed: 8 May 1874
- Jurisdiction: Thailand
- Headquarters: Privy Council Chambers, Phra Nakhon, Bangkok, Thailand
- Agency executive: Surayud Chulanont, President
- Website: Privy Council

The Privy Council of Thailand (Thai: คณะองคมนตรีไทย, romanized: khana ongkhamontri thai) is a body of appointed advisors to the Monarchy of Thailand. The council, as the Constitution of Thailand stipulates, must be composed of no more than eighteen members. The council is led by the President of the Privy Council of Thailand, currently occupied by former Prime Minister Surayud Chulanont since 27 May 2019. The king alone appoints all members of the council. The council's offices are in the Privy Council Chambers, Phra Nakhon District, Bangkok.

In recent years, the council and its president in particular, have been accused of interfering in politics. This stems from the council's closeness to the military, in particular during the 2006 Thai coup d'état. General Prem was reappointed president of the privy council by the King Maha Vajiralongkorn on 2 December 2016, although in 2018 the office was stripped of some of its powers.

== History ==
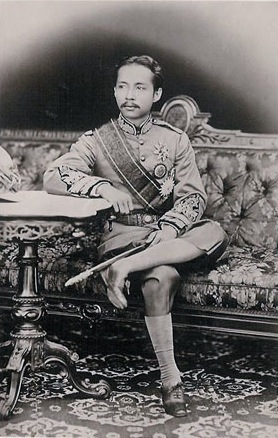
King Chulalongkorn based the first privy council on European models.

The first privy council in Siam was established by a royal decree on 8 May 1874, by King Chulalongkorn (or Rama V). The king, educated by Westerners, was keen on copying the system of government of the absolute monarchs of Europe. At first he created two councils: the "Privy Council of Siam" (Thai: ที่ปฤกษาในพระองค์; RTGS: thi prueksa nai phra ong; literally "advisory council on his Majesty's private affairs") (49 members) and the "Council of State" (Thai: สภาที่ปรึกษาราชการแผ่นดิน; RTGS: sapha thi prueksa ratchakan phaendin; literally "advisory council on public administration" (12 members, name later changed in Thai from "Sapha thi prueksa ratchakan phaendin" to "Ratthamontrisapha" (Thai: รัฐมนตรีสภา; literally "advisory council of state")). The privy council was created to deal with legislative affairs while the latter became an early version of the cabinet.

Chulalongkorn was succeeded by his son King Vajiravudh (Rama VI) in 1910, who at the beginning of his reign appointed a 40-member "Committee of the Privy Council" (Thai: สภากรรมการองคมนตรี; RTGS: sapha kammakan ongkhamontri). The king, during his 15 years on the throne, would continue to appoint new members at Thai New Year (or 4 April). When he died in 1925 the privy council was composed of 233 members.

King Prajadhipok (Rama VII) who succeeded his brother in 1925, completely overhauled the system and created instead three councils: The "Supreme Council of State of Siam" (Thai: อภิรัฐมนตรีสภา; RTGS: aphiratthamontrisapha) (composed of five senior princes, equivalent to the former Council of State); The "Council of Secretaries" (Thai: เสนาบดีสภา; RTGS: senabodisapha) (former Council of Ministers); and the Privy Council of State. The role of the Privy Council was relegated to minor legislative affairs, while the Supreme Council became Prajadhipok's main body of advisors.

On 24 June 1932, a group calling themselves the Khana Ratsadon (or People's Party), together with the military, seized power in Bangkok. They abolished the system of absolute monarchy, changing Siam into a parliamentary constitutional monarchy and demanding of Prajadhipok a constitution for the people of Siam. The king granted them a "temporary" constitution in the same month and a permanent one in December. The Khana Ratsadon, once in power, abolished the Supreme Council and the Privy Council. They replaced the Council of Secretaries with the People's Committee of Siam.

It was not until fifteen years later that the 1947 constitution of Siam recreated the Privy Council under King Bhumibol Adulyadej, with a name change to "Supreme Council of State" (Thai: คณะอภิรัฐมนตรี; RTGS: khana aphiratthamontri). This council existed from 1947 to 1949 and was composed of:

- Prince Rangsit Prayurasakdi, Prince of Chainat, President of the council
- Prince Dhani Nivat, Prince Bidyalabh Bridhyakon
- Prince Alongkot, Prince Adisorn Udomsak
- Phraya Manavaratsevi (Plod Vichear na Songkhla)
- Police General Adul Aduldejjarus

Two years later, under the 1949 Constitution of Thailand, the council was renamed the "Privy Council of Thailand" (Thai: สภาองคมนตรี; RTGS: sapha ongkhamontri or Thai: คณะองคมนตรี; RTGS: khana ongkhamontri). The Privy Council in its current form was created by the 2017 constitution of Thailand.

== Members ==
The present constitution stipulated that the council is composed of no more than eighteen members. The members of the Privy Council or Privy Councillors are appointed and removed at the pleasure of the king alone, but appointments must be countersigned by the President of the Privy Council.

The councillors cannot be partisan and therefore cannot be members of the House of Representatives, Senate of Thailand, Election Commission, Ombudsman, member of the National Human Rights Commission, judge of the Constitutional Court, judge of an Administrative Court, member of the National Counter Corruption Commission, member of the State Audit Commission, a government official holding a permanent position or receiving a permanent salary, an official of a state enterprise, other state official or holder of other position of member or official of a political party, and must not manifest loyalty to any political party. Privy councillors are not prohibited from sitting on the boards of influential companies and, under Prem, some councillors are board members of Bangkok Bank, Charoen Pokphand, the Boonrawd group, and the Charoen Siriwatanapakdi business group.

After being appointed the councillors must take the following oath in the presence of the king to assume office:

"I, (name of the declarer), do solemnly declare that I will be loyal to His Majesty the King and will faithfully perform my duties in the interests of the country and of the people. I will also uphold and observe the Constitution of the Kingdom of Thailand in every respect."

A councillor vacates office upon death, resignation, or at royal command.

=== President ===
The President of the Privy Council of Thailand is the head and chief councillor of the privy council. The king retains the power to appoint and remove the president, however the President of the National Assembly of Thailand must countersign presidential appointments and removals, unlike other councillors which the king alone decides.

== Functions ==
The 2017 Constitution gave the privy council many roles and powers. These are mostly associated with the issues surrounding the head of state and the monarchy.

=== Regency ===
If the king is incapacitated or for whatever reason and cannot appoint a regent, the privy council will submit to the National Assembly the name of a suitable individual, who must then be approved by a vote. During the period where there is no regent the President of the Privy Council shall be the regent pro tempore. This case is also applicable if the regent is incapacitated and cannot perform his duties. When this happens the President of the Privy Council shall be replaced in his duties to the council by a president pro tempore.

=== Palace Law of Succession ===
In regards to the amendment of the 1924 Palace Law of Succession, the king must ask the privy council to draft an amendment. After the king's approval and signature, the President of the Privy Council will notify the president of the National Assembly that will then countersign such amendment.

=== Vacancy on the throne ===
When the throne becomes vacant it is the duty of the privy council to submit to the cabinet and to the National Assembly the name of the successor to the throne. During this vacancy period (before the submission) the President of the Privy Council will be the regent pro tempore.

=== Other functions ===
Apart from these constitutionally mandated functions the privy councillors also perform other duties. For instance, they carry out other duties in the royal household and on royal projects. Several councillors are members of the Mahidol Foundation, while Dr. Chaovana Nasylvanta is the Director of the Crown Property Bureau. Councillors can, at royal command, attend official functions or carry out official duties on behalf of the king or the royal family.

== List of presidents of the Privy Council ==
| | Name | Dates as President |
|---|---|---|
| 1 | Prince Dhani Nivat | 18 June 1949 – 25 March 1950 |
| 2 | Prince Rangsit Prayurasakdi | 25 March 1950 – 7 March 1951 |
| 3 | Prince Alongkot | 13 March 1951 – 29 November 1951 |
| – | Jit na Songkhla | 27 May 1963 – 14 July 1963 |
| 4 | Mom Luang Dej Snidvongs | 24 March 1975 – 8 September 1975 |
| 5 | Sanya Dharmasakti | 5 December 1975 – 4 September 1998 |
| 6 | Prem Tinsulanonda | 4 September 1998 – 13 October 2016 |
| – | Thanin Kraivichien | 14 October 2016 – 2 December 2016 |
| (6) | Prem Tinsulanonda | 2 December 2016 – 26 May 2019 (died in office) |
| 7 | Surayud Chulanont | 2 January 2020 – Incumbent |

== List of current privy counsellors ==
| | Name | Appointed | Affiliation | Roles |
|---|---|---|---|---|
| 1 | General Surayud Chulanont | 6 December 2016 | Military | Senator (1992–1998); Commander of the Royal Thai Army Special Warfare Command (1992–1994); Commander of the 2nd Army Area (1994–1997); Commander-in-Chief of the Royal Thai Army (1998–2002); Supreme Commander of the Royal Thai Armed Forces (2002–2003); Privy Councillor (2003–2006; 2008–present); Prime Minister of Thailand (2006–2008); Minister of Interior (2007–2008); Acting President of the Privy Council (2019–2020); President of the Privy Council (2020–present) |
| 2 | Professor Emeritus Kasem Watanachai | 6 December 2016 | Education | Vice President of the Chiang Mai University (1985–1989); President of the Chiang Mai University (1989–1992); Senator (1996–2000); Chairman of the Silpakorn University Council (2000; 2002–2004); Minister of Education (2001); Privy Councillor (2001–present); Chairman of the Chiang Mai University Council (2003–2024) |
| 3 | Palakorn Suwannarat | 6 December 2016 | Civil Service | Governor of Pattani (1992–1996); Governor of Chiang Mai (1996–1998); Director of the Southern Border Provinces Administrative Centre (1997–2001); Privy Councillor (2001–present) |
| 4 | Adjunct Professor Atthaniti Disatha-Amnarj | 6 December 2016 | Judiciary | Chief Justice of the Civil Court (1999–2001); President of the Court of Appeal (2001–2002); President of the Supreme Court of Thailand (2002–2004); Privy Councillor (2007–present) |
| 5 | Air Chief Marshal Chalit Pukbhasuk | 6 December 2016 | Military | Director of Personnel, Royal Thai Air Force (1997–1998); Commander of the Royal Thai Air Force Academy (1998–1999); Commander-in-chief of the Royal Thai Air Force (2005–2008); Vice Chairman of the Council for Democratic Reform (2006); Vice Chairman of the Council for National Security (2006–2008); Acting Chairman of the Council for National Security (2007–2008); Privy Councillor (2011–present) |
| 6 | General Paiboon Koomchaya | 6 December 2016 | Military | Commander of the 1st Division (2007–2009); Vice Commander of the 1st Army Area (2009–2012); Commander of the 1st Army Area (2012–2013); Member of the National Council for Peace and Order (2014–2016); Ministers of Justice (2014–2016); Vice Chief of Defence Forces (2014–2015); Privy Councillor (2016–present) |
| 7 | General Dapong Ratanasuwan | 6 December 2016 | Military | Member of the National Legislative Assembly (2006–2008); Chief of Staff of the Royal Thai Army (2010–2011); Vice Commander-in-Chief of the Royal Thai Army (2011–2013); Member of the National Council for Peace and Order (2014–2016); Minister of Natural Resources and Environment (2014–2015); Minister of Education (2015–2016); Privy Councillor (2016–present) |
| 8 | General Kampanat Ruddit | 23 December 2016 | Military | Commander of the 1st Division (2009–2011); Vice Commander of the 1st Army Area (2011–2013); Member of the National Council for Peace and Order (2014–2016); Commander of the 1st Army Area (2014–2015); Member of the National Legislative Assembly (2014–2016); Privy Councillor (2016–present) |
| 9 | Admiral Pongthep Nuthep | 8 June 2017 | Military | Commander of the Royal Thai Naval Academy (2014–2015); Deputy Permanent Secretary for Defence (2016–2017); Privy Councillor (2017–present) |
| 10 | Associate Professor Chirayu Isarangkun Na Ayuthaya | 12 March 2018 | Royal Household | Deputy Minister of Industry (1981–1985); Minister of Industry (1985–1986); Minister to the Office of the Prime Minister (1986–1987); Director-General of the Crown Property Bureau (1987–2018); Lord Chamberlain of the Royal Household (2016–2018); Secretary of the Royal Project Foundation (2017–2018); Privy Councillor (2018–present) |
| 11 | Amphon Kittiamphon | 2 October 2018 | Financial | Secretary-General of the National Economic and Social Development Council (2004–2010); Director of the Office of Knowledge Management and Development (2009–2016); Secretary to the Cabinet (2010–2016); Chairman of the Board of Directors of the Bank of Thailand (2013–2018); Member of the National Legislative Assembly (2014–2018); Privy Councillor (2018–present) |
| 12 | General Chalermchai Sitthisart | 2 October 2018 | Military | Chief of Staff of the Royal Thai Army Special Warfare Command (2009); Vice Commander of the Royal Thai Army Special Warfare Command (2011–2013); Commander of the Royal Thai Army Special Warfare Command (2013–2015); Secretary-General of the National Council for Peace and Order (2014–2018); Member of the National Legislative Assembly (2014–2018); Commander-in-Chief of the Royal Thai Army (2016–2018); Privy Councillor (2018–present) |
| 13 | Air Chief Marshal Johm Rungsawang | 2 October 2018 | Military | Member of the National Council for Peace and Order (2014–2018); Chief of Staff of the Royal Thai Air Force (2014–2016); Member of the National Legislative Assembly (2014–2018); Commander-in-chief of the Royal Thai Air Force (2016–2018); Privy Councillor (2018–present) |
| 14 | Nurak Mapraneet | 4 May 2020 | Judiciary | Member of the Constitution Drafting Assembly (2007); Judge of the Constitutional Court (2008–2020); President of the Constitutional Court (2014–2020); Privy Councillor (2020–present) |
| 15 | Professor Emeritus Kasem Chankaew | 24 March 2021 | Education | Acting Director-General of the Royal Forest Department (1988); Privy Councillor (2021–present) |
| 16 | General Bundit Malaarisoon | 21 October 2022 | Military | Commander of the Chulachomklao Royal Military Academy (1993–1994); Commander of the 1st Army Area (1994–1995); Privy Councillor (2022–present) |
| 17 | General Prayut Chan-o-cha | 29 November 2023 | Military | Commander of the 21st Infantry Regiment (1998–2003); Commander of the 2nd Infantry Division (2003–2005); Commander of the 1st Army Area (2006–2008); Member of the National Legislative Assembly (2006–2008); Chief of Staff of the Royal Thai Army (2008–2009); Vice Commander-in-Chief of the Royal Thai Army (2009–2010); Commander-in-Chief of the Royal Thai Army (2010–2014); Leader of the National Council for Peace and Order (2014–2019); Acting Prime Minister of Thailand (2014); Prime Minister of Thailand (2014–2023); Minister of Defence (2019–2023); Privy Councillor (2023–present) |
| 18 | Sethaput Suthiwartnarueput | 26 March 2026 | Financial | Governor of the Bank of Thailand (2020–2025); Privy Councillor (2026–present) |
| 19 | Mom Luang Panadda Diskul | 16 May 2026 | Royal Household | Deputy Governor of Samut Sakhon (2003–2004); Deputy Governor of Pathum Thani (2004–2007); Deputy Governor of Buri Ram (2007–2008); Governor of Nakhon Pathom (2009–2010); Governor of Chiang Mai (2010–2012); Deputy Permanent Secretary to the Office of the Prime Minister (2012–2014); Permanent Secretary of Interior (2014–2015); Minister to the Office of the Prime Minister (2014–2016); Deputy Minister of Education (2016–2017); Senator (2019–2024); Privy Councillor (2026–present) |

== Notable members ==
=== The Privy Council of Thailand (Rama IX) ===
- Prince Rangsit Prayurasakdi
- Prince Dhani Nivat
- Prince Alongkot
- Plot Wichean na Songkhla
- Adul Aduldejjarus
- Prince Vivadhanajaya Jayanta
- Prince Nakkhatra Mangala
- Jit na Songkhla
- Hun Huntagun
- Dej Snidvongs
- Sak Senanarong
- Laihud Tititlanon
- Srisena Sombutsiri
- Gumpan Utaravanit
- Thongchai Chotikasatian
- Chalermlap Tavivong
- Sanya Dharmasakti
- Prince Vongsanuwat Devakula
- Pragob Hutasing
- Uttasit Sittisunton
- Jinda Boonyakom
- Prince Chakkapan Pensiri
- Samran Padtayakul
- Chaovana Nasylvanta
- Thanin Kraivichien
- Gun Israsena na Ayudhya
- Usni Pramoj
- Gumton Sintavanon
- Prem Tinsulanonda
- Chulanop Snidvongs na Ayudhaya
- Siddhi Savetsila
- Adulakit Kitiyakara
- Pichit Kullavanich
- Umpon Senanarong
- Jumrus Khemajaru
- Thawisan Ladawan
- Thepkamol Devakula
- Sakda Mokamakkul
- Kasem Wattanachai
- Palakorn Suwannarat
- Sawat Wattanayakon
- Surayud Chulanont
- Santi Thakral
- Chumpol Patjusanon
- Uttanit Ditumnat
- Chanchai Likitjitta
- Supachai Phungam
- Chalit Pukbhasuk
- Teerachai Nakwanich
- Wirach Chinvinitkul

=== The Privy Council of Thailand (Rama X) ===
On 2 December 2016, King Maha Vajiralongkorn reappointed General Prem Tinsulanonda president of the privy council. General Prem became regent pro tempore at the death of King Bhumibol Adulyadej on the 13 October 2016. After Vajiralongkorn accepted the invitation to become king he was able to appoint his own council.

On 6 December 2016 the king appointed ten councillors, seven from his father's council and three new members. Eight members from the previous council were not reappointed.

As of December 2023 the council was composed mostly of retired military leaders and members of the judiciary, with 19 members:

- Surayud Chulanont
- Kasem Watanachai
- Palakorn Suwannarat
- Chalit Pukbhasuk
- Supachai Phungam
- Atthaniti Disatha-Amnarj
- Paiboon Koomchaya
- Dapong Ratanasuwan
- Charunthada Karnasuta
- Kampanat Ruddit
- Pongthep Nuthep
- Chirayu Isarangkun Na Ayuthaya
- Amphon Kittiamphon
- Chalermchai Sitthisart
- Johm Rungsawang
- Nurak Mapraneet
- Kasem Chankaew
- Bundit Malaarisoon
- Prayut Chan-o-cha
- Sethaput Suthiwartnarueput

== See also ==
- Monarchy of Thailand
- Chakri Dynasty
- Regent of Thailand
- 1924 Palace Law of Succession
- Government of Thailand
- Politics of Thailand
- 2006 Thai coup d'état
- Supreme Council of State of Siam
