= Udomdej Sitabutr =

Thai military officer and politician

Udomdej Sitabutr MPCh MWM RM
- อุดมเดช สีตบุตร
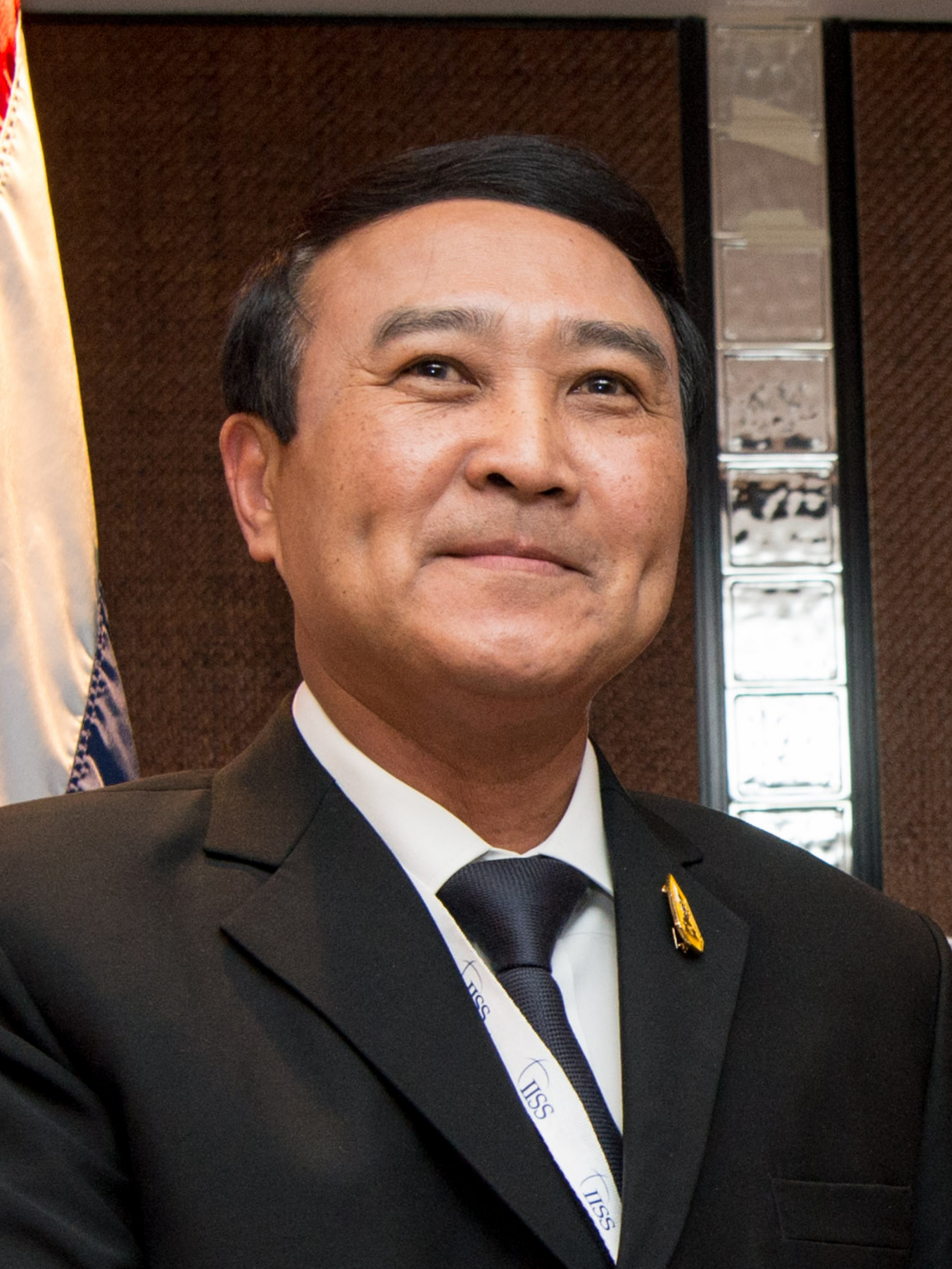
- Udomdej at Asia Security Summit in 2017

Deputy Minister of Defence
- In office 30 August 2014 – 23 November 2017
- Prime Minister: Prayut Chan-o-cha
- Minister: Prawit Wongsuwan
- Preceded by: Yuthasak Sasiprapha
- Succeeded by: Chaichan Changmongkol

Commander-in-chief of the Royal Thai Army
- In office 1 October 2014 – 30 September 2015
- Preceded by: Prayut Chan-o-cha
- Succeeded by: Thirachai Nakwanich

Personal details
- Born: 15 August 1955 (age 71) Bangkok, Thailand
- Spouse: Vidapa Sitabutr
- Children: 2
- Education: Chulachomklao Royal Military Academy; National Defence College
- Nickname: Dong

Military service
- Allegiance: Thailand
- Branch/service: Royal Thai Army
- Years of service: 1978–2015
- Rank: General
- Commands: Commander in Chief (Army)
- Battles/wars: Communist insurgency in Thailand; Vietnamese border raids in Thailand
- Awards: Rama Medal; Freemen Safeguarding Medal (Second Class, First Category); Border Service Medal; Chakra Mala Medal; Pingat Jasa Gemilang (Tentera)

Udomdej Sitabutr (Thai: อุดมเดช สีตบุตร, RTGS: Udomdet Sitabut; born 15 August 1955) is a Thai military officer. He served as Commander-in-Chief of the Royal Thai Army from 2014 to 2015.

== Education ==
Udomdej studied at Saint Gabriel's College, an all-boys school. He then decided to go into a military career and proceeded to study at Armed Forces Academies Preparatory School (Class 14) and Chulachomklao Royal Military Academy (Class 25). Once finished in cadet school, he studied at Command and General Staff College (Class 65) and National Defence College (Class 57).

== Career ==
Udomdej started duty in the 21st Infantry Regiment, King's Guard, considered part of the Queen's Guards. After that, he was appointed Chief of Staff of the 1st Army Area and the Commander of 1st Army Area respectively. In 2013, he was appointed as Deputy Army Commander.

Sitabutr succeeded Prayuth Chan-ocha, who in May 2014, had seized power in a coup d'état.

He concurrently served as Secretary-General of the junta, the National Council for Peace and Order. During his tenure he was implicated in the Rajabhakti Park scandal, having overseen its construction as Chairman of the Rajabhakti Foundation.

Udomdej retired in 2015 and was succeeded by Theerachai Nakvanich, with whom he had had a long-running feud.

During his tenure as Commander-in-Chief of the Royal Thai Army, he received another position that was appointed by Prime Minister Prayuth Chan-ocha to become Deputy Minister of Defence under Minister Prawit Wongsuwon. He was fined from the cabinet on 23 November 2017.

== Early life ==
He is the youngest of six children. One of his older siblings, Paisarn Sitabutr, is himself a retired Air Chief Marshal in the Royal Thai Air Force and a member of the National Legislative Assembly.

== Honours ==
Udomdej received the following royal decorations in the Honours System of Thailand:

- 2014 - Knight Grand Cordon of the Most Exalted Order of the White Elephant
- 2011 - Knight Grand Cordon of the Most Noble Order of the Crown of Thailand
- 1990 - Member of the Rama Mala Medal of the Honourable Order of Rama
- 1986 - Freemen Safeguarding Medal (Second Class, First Category)
- 1991 - Border Service Medal
- 1998 - Chakra Mala Medal
