= Saint Gabriel's College (Thailand) =

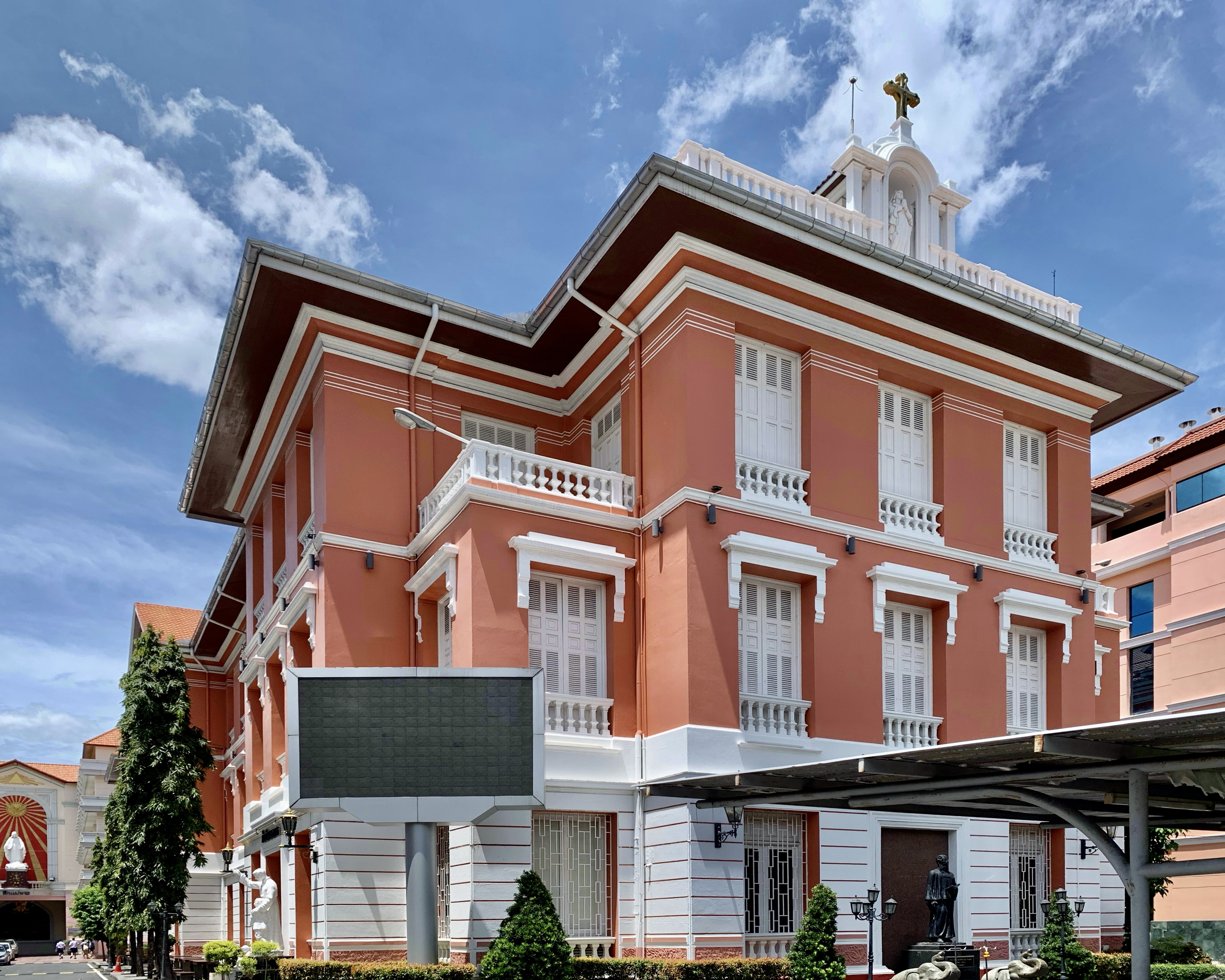

Location
- Dusit Bangkok; Thailand; 13°46′33″N 100°30′23″E

Information
- Type: Private Roman Catholic All-boys Basic (Primary - Grades 1-6 and Secondary - Grades 7-12) education institution
- Motto: Labor omnia vincit (Latin) (Labor conquers all things)
- Religious affiliations: Roman Catholic (Gabrielite Brothers)
- Established: 1920; 106 years ago
- Founder: Bro. Martin de Tours, f.s.g.
- Director: Bro. Surakit Srisrankulwong, f.s.g.
- Colours: Blue and white
- Languages taught: Thai; English; Chinese
- Website: www.sg.ac.th

Saint Gabriel's College (Thai: โรงเรียนเซนต์คาเบรียล) is a private Catholic all-boys school in Bangkok, Thailand. The school was founded by the Brothers of Saint Gabriel in 1920.

The school educates students from grade 1 through grade 12 (K–12). Admission, especially in first grade, is highly competitive as only approximately 416 students per year are admitted. Total school enrollment is roughly 5,000 students. The school is known for its intensive English program.

== History ==
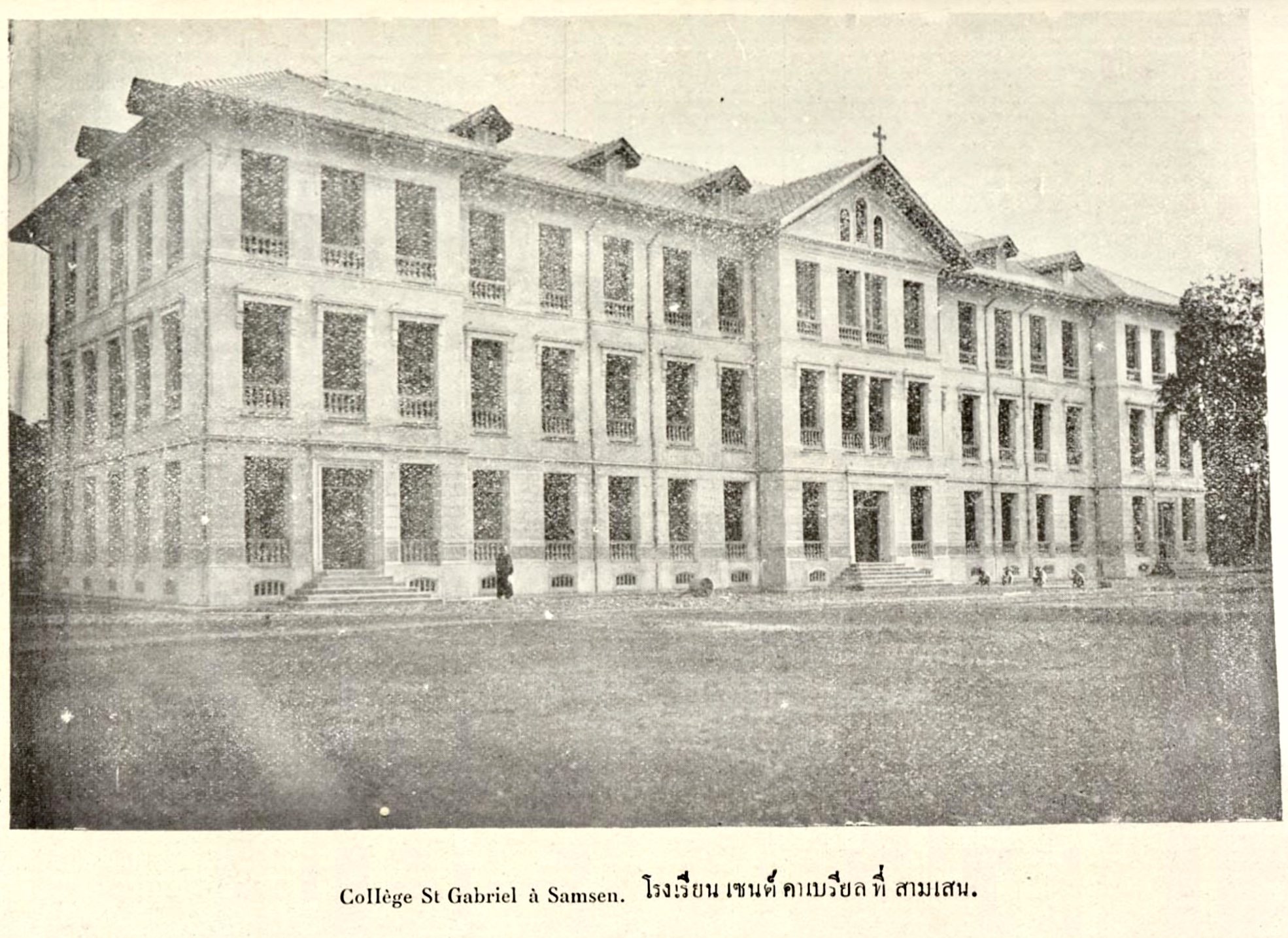
Saint Gabriel's College (circa 1920s)

In 1918, after the World War I ended, the demand for schools and education in Bangkok sharply increased. At that time, the Brothers of Saint Gabriel had established only one school in Bangkok, Assumption College. As a response to increasing demand, Brother Martin de Tours proposed opening a new school in Bangkok. He accepted a plot of land offered by Father Brozat of the nearby Saint Francis Xavier Church in Samsen as the site for his vision.

Construction began in 1920, the chief engineer being Mr. Be'quelin. The main building was designed entirely by Brother Martin de Tours. The building, which cost approximately 100,000 Thai baht, was completed in February 1922. Due to the building being painted light red, it has since been referred to as "tuk-daeng" (Thai: ตึกแดง) ('the red building').

In 1920, while construction was still taking place, Bro. Martin de Tours and his teaching staff began teaching temporarily at Mr. Berli's house. There were 141 students enrolled in the first year.

== Symbol ==
The symbol of Saint Gabriel's College is a coat of arms. The middle part is an escutcheon divided into four parts which are:

- A.M and white bouquet of tuberose: "A.M" means Ave Maria which means 'mother of Christ'. The white bouquet of tuberose represent a purity that all students of Saint Gabriel's aspire to.
- Boat and Polaris: the boat represents life's struggle comparing it to a boat's journey to the shore. Polaris represents hope.
- DS and a cross: "DS" stands for "Divinity" meaning that everyone needs to have a religion and "Science" which means knowledge obtained from various things. The cross for the sacrifice of Jesus.
- The flower around the coat of arms is an ornament that reminds students to do good—for themselves and other.

== Buildings ==
Saint Gabriel's College has 12 buildings and one stadium:

- Martin De Tours building (ตึกมาร์ติน เดอ ตูร์) or Tuk-Daeng (ตึกแดง ตึกอำนวยการ) was the first Saint Gabriel building, constructed in the age of Brother Martin De Tours. Tuk-Daeng since then has become the most significant emblem of the school. It can be seen first when entering the school. It was no longer used as a classroom for students, but it was used as the room of the chief manager and principal's office. Today, Tuk-Daeng is renovated and preserved as a memorial of the school.
- De Montfort building (ตึกเดอ มงฟอร์ต) is a four-storey building. On first and second floor are cafeterias for students, an auditorium and a library. On third and fourth floor are music rooms.
- John Mary building (ตึกจอห์น แมรี่) is a dormitory for foreign teachers and staffs. This building also houses the roof top John Mary Center for the Performing Arts which was funded and conceptualized by noted philanthropist Devin DiCristofaro and constructed by architect John McLaughlin.
- Greg Gymnasium building (ตึกเกรก ยิมเนเซี่ยม)is a five-storey building which was constructed in 1971. It has a basketball court for students primary 5 and 6.
- Fatima building (ตึกฟาติมา รศ 200) is a seven-storey building which constructed in 1980. It was the building for primary 1,2,3 some of primary 5 classroom and primary 5 staff room and a second auditorium. It used to have a playground on the 3rd floor before being removed.
- Hubert building (ตึกฮิวเบิร์ต) Contains facilities such as a fitness center, swimming pool and car park.
- Andrew building (ตึกแอนดรู) is a six-storey building which was constructed in 2001. It was the building for secondary 1 and 2 students. It contains the Principal's residence and used to have a mini golf ring before it was closed due to frequent electrical leaks.
- Mae-Phra building (ตึกแม่พระ) is a six-storey building (including basement). It was constructed in 2007. Mae-Phra has a basketball court, swimming pool for secondary students, auditorium, and laboratory. It was the building for secondary 3–6 students.
- Annunciation building (ตึกแม่พระรับสาส์น) is the newest building of Saint Gabriel's College. It was constructed in 2012. It was the building for primary 4.
- 90th Anniversary building (ตึก 90 ปี) is a five-story building which was built for celebrating 90 years of Saint Gabriel's College.
- Martin De Tours Stadium (มาร์ติน เดอ ตูร์ สเตเดี้ยม) is the artificial turf football field with metal bleachers.

== Directors ==
Years in office	Name
1920–1926	Bro. Martin De Tours
1926–1932	Bro. Frederic Jean (1)
1932–1938	Bro. Hubert (1)
1938–1941	Bro. Frederic Jean (2)
1941–1944	Bro. Theophane Venard
1944–1947	Bro. Aloysius
1947–1953	Bro. Monfort Del Rosario (1)
1953–1955	Bro. John Mary
1955–1961	Bro. Hubert (2)
1961–1966	Bro. Monfort Del Rosario (2)
1966–1968	Bro. Alphonsus De Liquori
1968–1974	Bro. Pratheep Martin Komolmas
1975–1977	Bro. Fillip Amnuay Pinrat (1)
1977–1983	Bro. Meesak Wongprachanukul
1983–1985	Bro. Fillip Amnuay Pinrat (2)
1985–1991	Bro. Buncha Saenghirun
1991–1997	Bro. Arun Metthaseth
1997–2003	Bro. Wisit Sriwichairut
2003–2013	Bro. Anusak Nidhibhadrabhorn
2013–2018	Bro. Vinai Viriyavidhayavongs
2018–2022	Bro. Monthon Patumraj
2022–Present	Bro. Surakit Srisrankulwong

== Notable alumni ==
- M.R. Adulakit Kitiyakara (1930–2004), brother of Queen Sirikit, former President of the Supreme Court, former Privy Councillor
- Samak Sundaravej (1935–2009), former Prime Minister of Thailand
- Rapee Sagarik (1922–2018), Thai horticulturist, botanist and orchid expert
- Yuthasak Sasiprapha (born 1937), General, former minister of defence, former president of the National Olympic Committee of Thailand
- Teeradej Meepien (born 1938), General, former President of the Senate of Thailand
- Chirayu Isarangkun Na Ayuthaya (born 1943), former Lord Chamberlain of the Royal Household and former Director-General of the Crown Property Bureau
- Kosit Panpiemras (1943–2016), Executive Chairman of Bangkok Bank, former Minister of Industry and Deputy Prime Minister
- Surayud Chulanont (born 1943), General, former Commander-in-chief of the Royal Thai Army, former Prime Minister of Thailand
- Prawit Wongsuwan (born 1945), General, former Commander-in-chief of the Royal Thai Army, former Minister of Defence, former Deputy Prime Minister
- Korn Dabbaransi (born 1945), former Deputy Prime Minister, former Minister of Science and Technology and Minister of Public Health
- Supachai Panitchpakdi (born 1946), former Director-General of the World Trade Organization (WTO), former Secretary-General of the UN Conference on Trade and Development (UNCTAD)
- M.R. Pridiyathorn Devakula (born 1947), former Governor of the Bank of Thailand, former Minister of Finance and Deputy Prime Minister
- Rewat Buddhinan (1948–1996), founder of the GMM Grammy
- Kobsak Sabhavasu (born 1949), former Deputy Prime Minister
- Thirachai Phuvanatnaranubala (born 1951), former Minister of Finance
- Itthaporn Subhawong (born 1952), former Commander-in-chief of the Royal Thai Air Force
- Udomdej Sitabutr (born 1955), former Commander-in-chief of the Royal Thai Army
- Suwat Liptapanlop (born 1955), former Deputy Prime Minister
- Ken Prayoon Cheng (born 1957), entrepreneur and investor, founder of many successful US-based companies including NetIQ/Attachmate, Proximex/Tyco International, etc.
- Pornchai Mongkhonvanit (born 1958), President of Siam University
- Pirapan Salirathavibhaga (born 1959), Deputy Prime Minister and Minister of Energy
- Apirat Kongsompong (born 1960), former Commander-in-chief of the Royal Thai Army
- Choengchai Chomchoengpaet (born 1963), incumbent Commander-in-chief of the Royal Thai Navy
- Varawut Silpa-archa (born 1973), former Minister of Natural Resources and Environment
- Aiyawatt Srivaddhanaprabha (born 1985), CEO of King Power
- Akanat Promphan (born 1986), Minister of Industry
- Sanon Wangsrangboon (born 1989), Deputy Governor of Bangkok
- Talay Sanguandikul (born 1995), Actor and singer
- Timethai (born 1996), Actor and singer
- Billkin Putthipong Assaratanakul (born 1999), Actor and singer
- Dew Jirawat Sutivanichsak (born 2000), Actor and singer
- Nut Thanat Danjesda (born 2003), member of T-Pop group LYKN and Actor
- Fourth Nattawat Jirochtikul (born 2004), Actor and singer
- Java Bhobdhama Hansa (born 2005), Actor
- Passawish Thamasungkeeti (born 2009), Actor
