= Apirat Kongsompong =

Thai military officer (born 1960)

General Apirat Kongsompong MPCh MWM ThChW
- อภิรัชต์ คงสมพงษ์
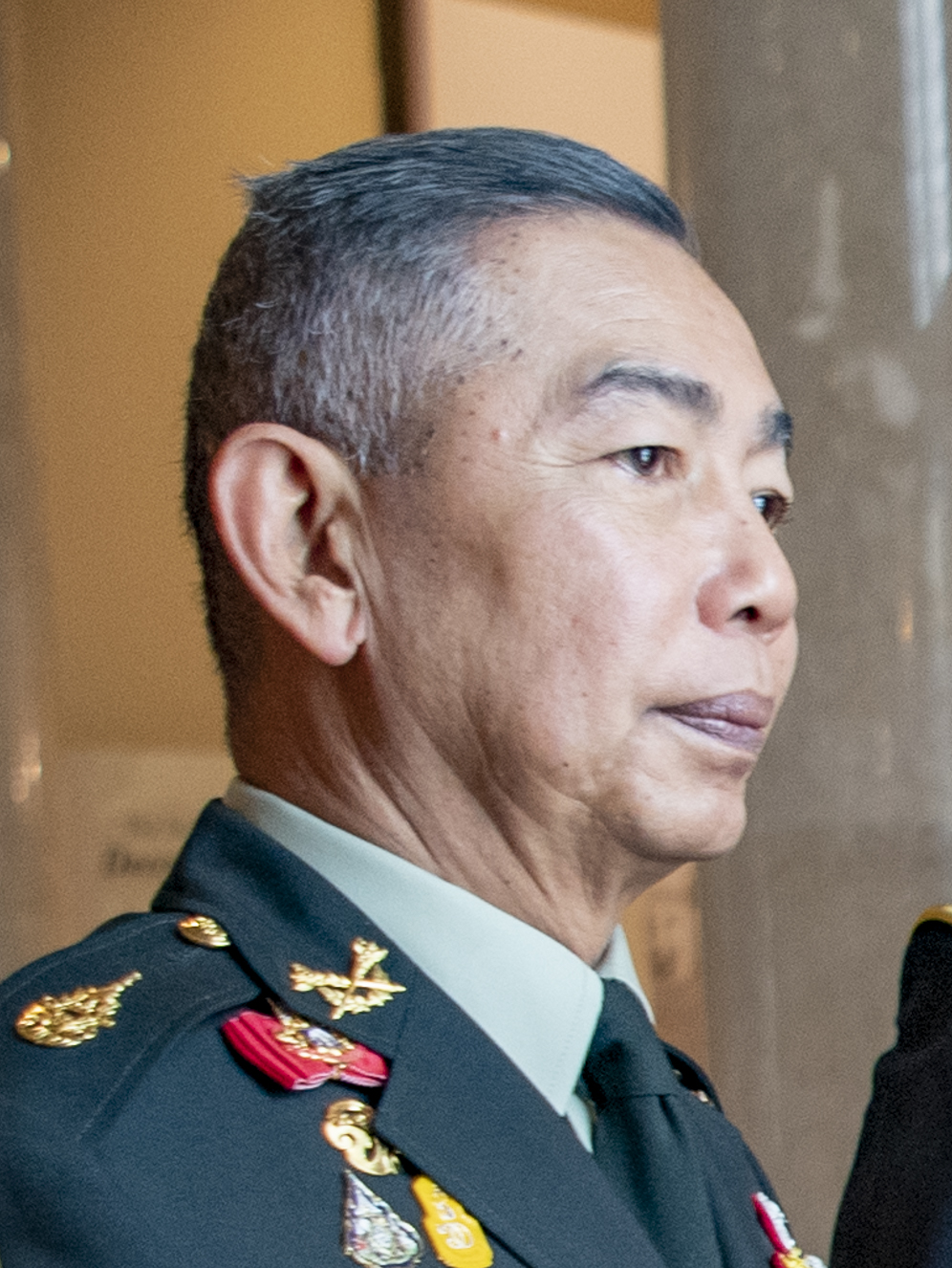

Member of the Senate of Thailand
- Ex officio 11 May 2019 – 30 September 2020
- Succeeded by: Narongphan Jitkaewthae

Commander-in-chief of the Royal Thai Army
- In office 1 October 2018 – 30 September 2020
- Preceded by: Chalermchai Sitthisart
- Succeeded by: Narongphan Jitkaewthae

Personal details
- Born: 23 March 1960 (age 66) Bangkok, Thailand
- Spouse: Kritika Kongsompong
- Children: Major Pirapong Kongsompong; Major Amarat Kongsompong (MD); Nadthadon Kongsompong
- Parent: Sunthorn Kongsompong Orachorn Kongsompong
- Education: Chulachomklao Royal Military Academy; National Defence College
- Nickname: Daeng

Military service
- Allegiance: Thailand
- Branch/service: Royal Thai Army; Royal Security Command
- Years of service: 1985–2020
- Rank: General
- Commands: commanders-in-chief; 1st Division, King's Guard; 11th Infantry Division; 11th Infantry Regiment, King's Guard
- Battles/wars: Communist insurgency in Thailand; South Thailand insurgency

Apirat Kongsompong (Thai: อภิรัชต์ คงสมพงษ์; RTGS: Apirat Khongsomphong; born 23 March 1960) is a retired Thai military officer who was the Commander in Chief of the Royal Thai Army from October 2018 to September 2020. He also served as the Vice-Chamberlain of the Royal Household Bureau and the deputy director of the Crown Property Bureau from 2020 to 2024.

Kongsompong held multiple positions in various bodies and industries throughout his career, including Chairman of the board of directors of Government Lottery Office, Independent Director at Bangchak Petroleum Public Co., Member of the National Legislative Assembly, Secretary of the National Council for Peace and Order, and Member of the Senate.

== Early life and education ==
Kongsompong was born in Bangkok on 23 March 1960. He is the eldest son of General Sunthorn Kongsompong, and Colonel Khunying Orachorn Kongsompong. His younger brother, Nattaporn Kongsompong, is also a retired Royal Army officer. Kongsompong completed his primary and part of secondary education at Saint Gabriel's College. He later attended the Armed Forces Academies Preparatory School and went on to attend Chulachomklao Royal Military Academy, from which he graduated in 1985.

He went on to receive an MBA from the Southeastern University of Washington DC.

== Controversies ==
=== The Langkawi Deal ===
In 2023, Kongsompong was reported to have attended a private meeting with controversial political and business figures on Malaysia's Langkawi island, just before the general elections in Thailand. The meeting was part of the talks to establish a government after the election, according to Thai media. It was also said that Kongsompong's involvement in these discussions drew criticism from the general public, who discussed the concerns about the involvement of unelected officials such as Kongsompong in the process of forming governments, and raised questions about the political system's lack of accountability and transparency.

== Military career ==
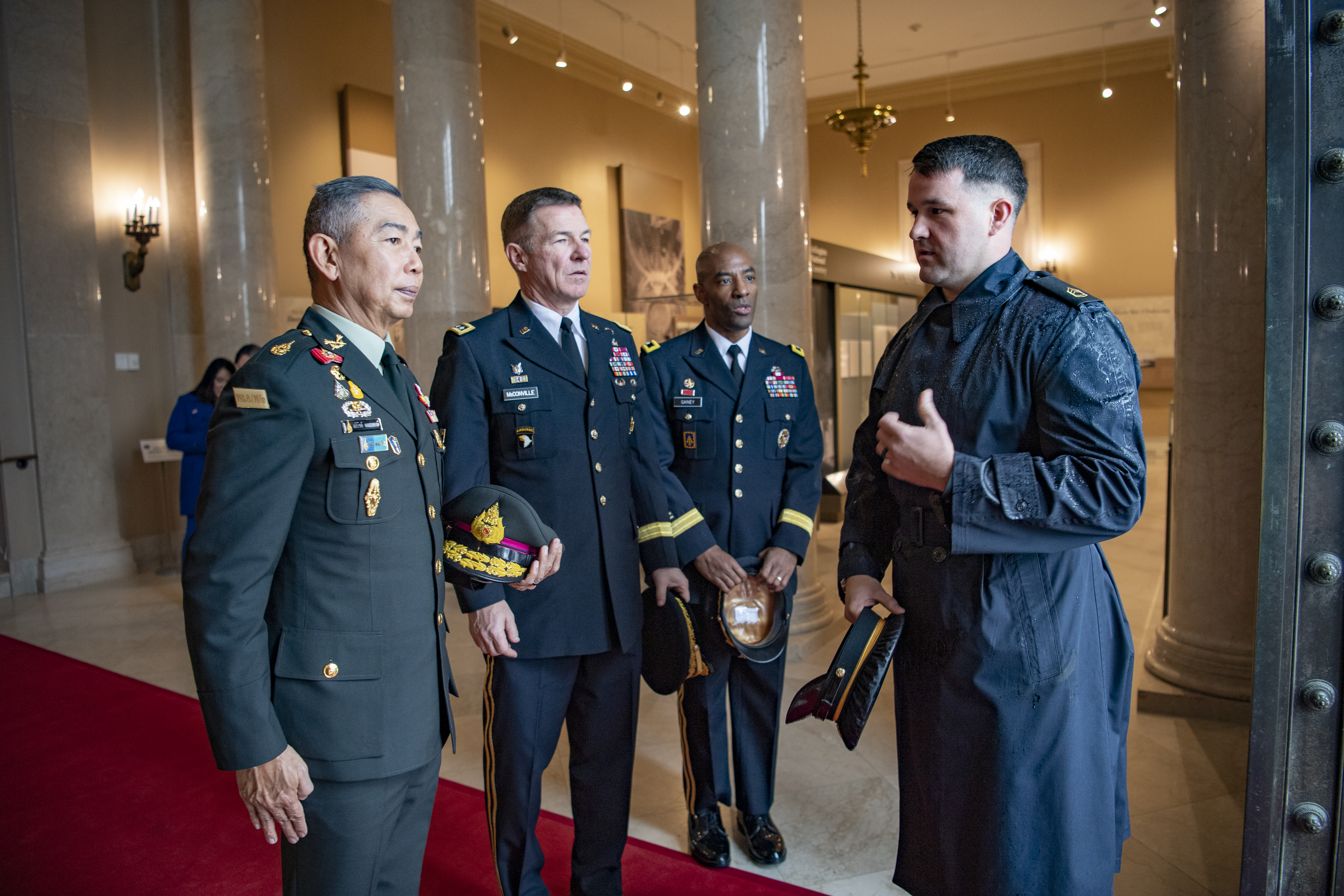
Kongsompong (left) with General James McConville Chief of staff, U.S. Army at Arlington National Cemetery

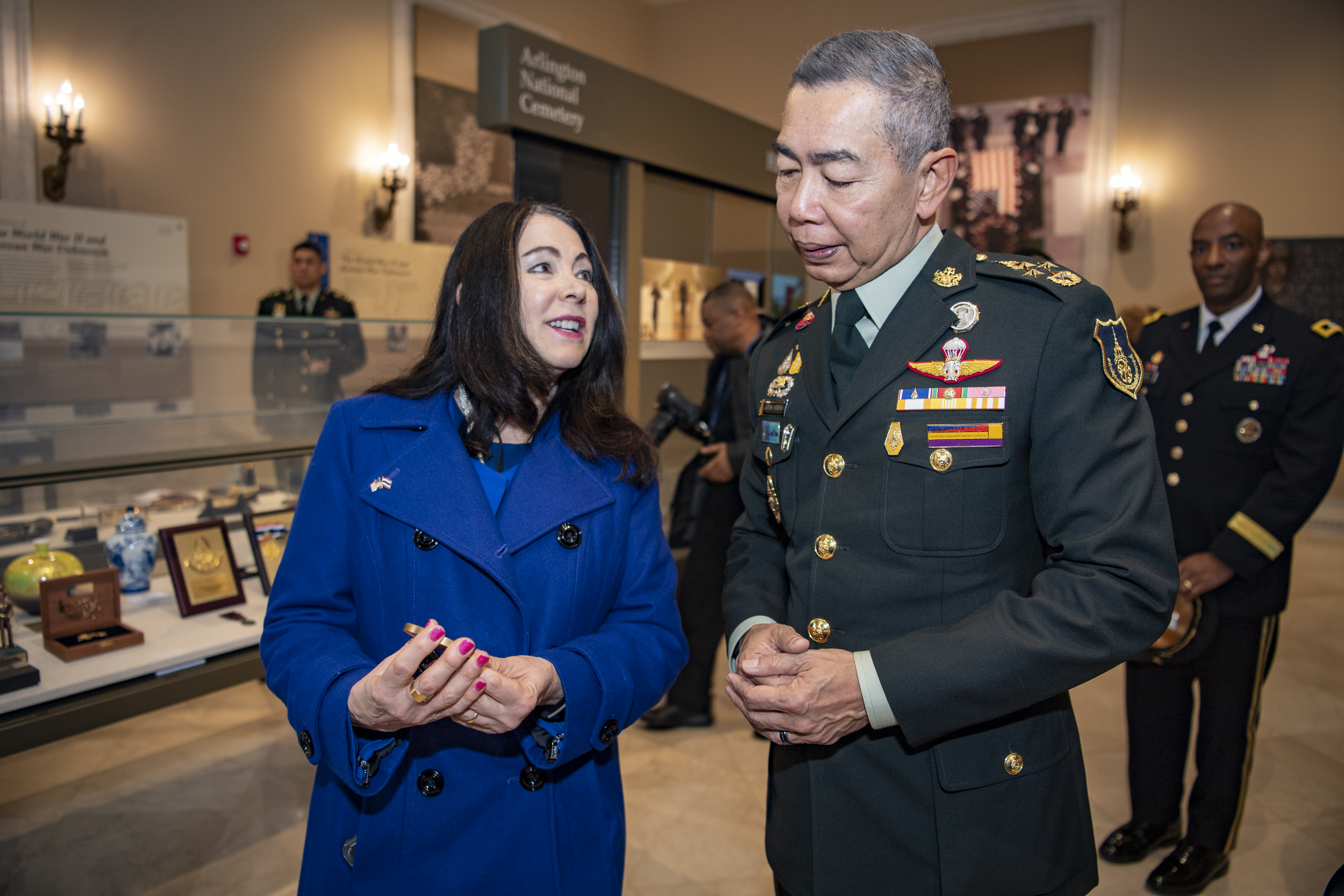
Kongsompong at Arlington County, Virginia in 2020

Kongsompong received a commission as an army officer upon graduation from Chulachomklao Royal Military Academy in 1985. He served as a pilot at the Army Aviation Center at the beginning of his military career. He completed UH-1H Maintenance/Test Pilot Training at Fort Eustis, Virginia, USA. He also completed the AH-1H Pilot Training Course at Fort Rucker, Alabama, USA. Kongsompong is also a graduate of Infantry Officer Advanced Course at Fort Benning, Georgia, USA. In October 1990, he was appointed Assistant Logistics Officer at the Royal Thai Army Defense Attaché Office in Washington D.C.

Kongsompong commanded the 2nd Battalion, 11th Infantry Regiment, King's Guard in Bangkok. He went on to command 11th Infantry Regiment King's Guard. He served as the Commanding General of 11th Infantry Division in Chachoengsao Province. He went on to serve as the Commanding General of 15th Military Circle in Phetchaburi province. Kongsompong commanded the 1st Division of the King's Guard in Bangkok. In 2016, Kongsompong was appointed the Commanding General of the 1st Army Area. He was promoted to Assistant Commander in Chief of the Royal Thai Army in 2017. Kongsompong was appointed the Commander in Chief of the Royal Thai Army in 2018, a position he held until his retirement in September 2020.

His deployment experience includes anti-communist operations in 1986. He served as the Commander of Task Force 14 which conducted counter-insurgency operations in Yala Province in 2004.

Kongsompong is associated with the military clique Wong Thewan, in turn associated with the 1st Division, the King's Guard.

=== Army chief ===
Barely a month into his tenure as army chief, Kongsompong received mixed media coverage to his comments on the necessity for military intervention in Thai politics.

In October 2019, Kongsompong hosted a special sermon on propaganda in Thailand. As the National security officer, he raised concerns about the usage of social media for digital propaganda.

In October 2019, Kongsompong warned in a speech to military officers, policemen, and uniformed students that, "Propaganda in Thailand is severe and worrying. There is a group of communists who still have ideas to overthrow the monarchy, to turn Thailand to communism..." His words prompted the Bangkok Post to remark, "It was 'a lecture' that should never have been given by any army chief, for its combination of accusations against 'the left' and young people, and sensational and biased political messages." The speech prompted one analyst to urge that rival factions end the "enemy mindset". His comments sparked criticism online for being a partisan bureaucrat.

After the Nakhon Ratchasima shootings in 2020, in which the perpetrator cited corruption in the army as motives, Kongsompong established an anonymous complaint hotline program. However, national media reported the hotline to have no concrete achievements.

In July 2020, Sereepisuth Temeeyaves, a former police chief and leader of an opposition party Seree Ruam Thai, condemned Kongsompong's intervention in politics.

== Honours ==
=== Royal Decorations ===
- Knight Grand Commander of the Order of Chula Chom Klao
- Knight Grand Cordon of the Order of the White Elephant
- Knight Grand Cordon of the Order of the Crown of Thailand
- King Rama X Royal Cypher Medal, 3rd Class
- Freemen Safeguarding Medal (Second Class, Second Category)
- Border Service Medal
- Chakra Mala Medal

=== Foreign Honours ===
- Grand Cross of the Royal Order of Sahametrei
- Grand Commander of the Order of Sultan Ibrahim of Johor
- Commander of the Legion of Merit
- Pingat Jasa Gemilang (Tentera)

== Other appointments ==
Kongsompong retired from the military on 30 September 2020. In the same year, he was appointed as the vice-chamberlain of the Bureau of the Royal Household and the deputy director of the Crown Property Bureau. In 2024, he retired from his appointments in the royal household due to health issues.

Military offices
Preceded by Chalermchai Sitthisart	Commander-in-Chief of the Royal Thai Army; 2018–2020	Succeeded by Narongpan Jitkaewthae
