= Dej Snidvongs =

Thai minister

Mom Luang Dej Snidvongs TCW MPCh MWM PC
- เดช สนิทวงศ์
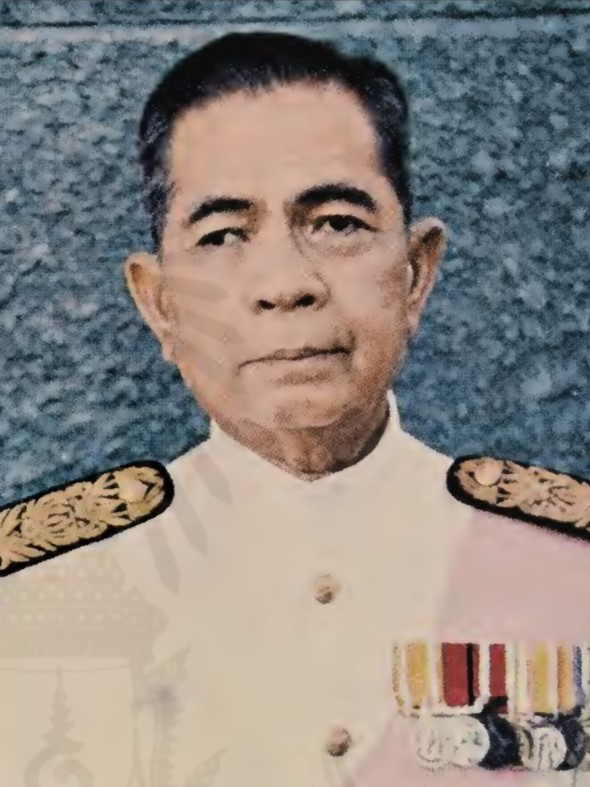

President of the Privy Council
- In office 24 March 1975 – 8 September 1975
- Monarch: Bhumibol Adulyadej
- Preceded by: Prince Alongkot
- Succeeded by: Sanya Dharmasakti

Governor of the Bank of Thailand
- In office 4 August 1949 – 29 February 1952
- Preceded by: Leng Srisomwongse
- Succeeded by: Serm Vinicchayakul

Minister of Economic Affairs
- In office 10 November 1947 – 21 February 1948
- Prime Minister: Khuang Aphaiwong
- Preceded by: Duan Bunnag
- Succeeded by: Munee Mahasanthana Vejayantarungsarit

Personal details
- Born: Dej (Note: At that time, Thais did not have surnames.); 18 February 1898 Bangkok, Thailand
- Died: 8 September 1975 (aged 77) Bangkok, Thailand
- Height: 1.65 m (5 ft 5 in)
- Spouse: Prayong Snidvongs na Ayudhya
- Children: 4
- Education: University of Bern

Mom Luang Dej Snidvongs (Thai: เดช สนิทวงศ์; 18 February 1898 – 8 September 1975) was a Thai honorary academic. He was the President of the Privy Council of Thailand to King Bhumibol Adulyadej and Governor of the Bank of Thailand in 1949 to 1952. He was given the title of Luang Dejsahakorn.

== Family and education ==
Dej was the third son of Mom Rajawongse Sathand Snidvongs and Thanphuying Tat Singhaseni. He was born in the palace of Prince Sai Snidvongs, Pom Prap Sattru Phai District, Phra Nakhon Province on 18 February 1898. He has 14 half-brothers and sisters, one of whom was Bua Snidvongs, mother of Queen Sirikit, therefore being the Queen's uncle.

Dej began to study at his aunt Khunying Hong's house. Later in 1906, he attended the Debsirin School. Later, he moved to King's College under the Ministry of Justice at Bang Khwang Sub-district, Nonthaburi Province. In 1914 he received government scholarships to study in Germany. Subsequently, World War I occurred on 4 August 1914 when the Thai government declared war on Germany on 22 July 1917 he was arrested by German government with 4 Thai students, namely Tua Lapanukrom, Term Bunnag, Prachuap Bunnag and Mom Luang Udom Snidvongs. Later in 1918 has a revolution in Germany Thai captive students were released. Therefore, joined the Siamese Expeditionary Forces together with the Allies invading Germany. After the end of the war, he moved to study in Bern, Switzerland in 1919 and was able to take the entrance examination at the University of Bern in the year 1920 and graduated with a Doktorrerum Politicarum (Cum Laude) degree in 1925. After that, he traveled to study and research the history of economics and trade between Thailand and the United Kingdom 6 months before returning to Thailand in 1926.

Dej married Prayong Snidvongs na Ayudhya in 1928. There are 4 children, Warunyapha Snidvongs na Ayudhya, Phisit Snidvongs na Ayudhya, Manu-seri Snidvongs na Ayudhya and Kasem Snidvongs na Ayudhya. He died of lung cancer at Chulalongkorn Hospital on 8 September 1975 at 22.33 hrs at the age of 77 years old.

== Careers ==
Dej started the first government service in 1926 as the commissioner of the Department of Commerce's, Minister of Economic Affairs. In 1935 he was the Permanent Secretary of the Ministry of Agriculture and then in 1942 as Permanent Secretary of the Ministry of Economy and acting in the position of Permanent Secretary of the Ministry of Commerce in the same year. In 1949 he was the Governor of the Bank of Thailand.

Dej was part of the first constitutional Cabinet of Siam under Phraya Manopakorn Nititada in 1932. Later, in the period of Field Marshal Plaek Phibunsongkhram as Prime Minister in 1938, he held the position of Deputy Minister of Agriculture. Later in 1974 as Deputy Minister of Economic Affairs in Khuang Aphaiwong government. In 1944, he also joined the cabinet by being the Minister of Economic Affairs and joined the government of Khuang Aphaiwong. In 1947, he served as Minister of Economic Affairs for a period and in 1948 he was appointed as Minister to the Office of the Prime Minister.

Dej was appointed to the Privy Council of Thailand on 24 April 1947 and was its president from 18 February 1975 until his death.

== Royal decorations ==
Sanya received the following royal decorations in the Honours System of Thailand:

- Knight Grand Cross of The Most Illustrious Order of Chula Chom Klao
- Knight Grand Cordon of the Most Exalted Order of the White Elephant
- Knight Grand Cordon of The Most Noble Order of the Crown of Thailand
- War Medal of B.E. 2461
- Medal for Service Rendered in the Interior (Indochina)
- King Rama IX Royal Cypher Medal, 1st Class
- Chai Medal
- First Class of Red Cross Medal of Appreciation (gold medal)

=== Foreign honours ===
- Grand Cross of the Order of the Dannebrog (Denmark) - 1958
- Order of Merit of the Federal Republic of Germany (Germany) - 1962
- Grand Decoration of Honour in Gold with Sash for Services to the Republic of Austria (Austria) - 1964
