= Chaiyasit Shinawatra =

Thai general (born 1945)

Chaiyasit Shinawatra MPCh MWM
- ชัยสิทธิ์ ชินวัตร
- Born: 25 June 1945 (age 81); Bangkok, Thailand
- Education: Chulachomklao Royal Military Academy
- Spouse: Wina Suksapha
- Children: 2
- Relatives: Thaksin Shinawatra (first cousin); Yingluck Shinawatra (first cousin)
- Family: member of Shinawatra family
- Military career
- Allegiance: Thailand
- Branch: Royal Thai Army
- Service years: 1969–2005
- Rank: General; Admiral; Air Chief Marshal
- Nickname: Tui
- Commands: Supreme Commander of the Royal Thai Armed Forces; Commander-in-chief of the Royal Thai Army
- Conflicts: Communist insurgency in Thailand
- Awards: Freemen Safeguarding Medal (Second Class, Second Category); Border Service Medal; Chakra Mala Medal; Pingat Jasa Gemilang (Tentera)

Chaiyasit Shinawatra (Thai: ชัยสิทธิ์ ชินวัตร; RTGS: Chaiyasit Chinnawat; born 25 June 1945) is a former commander-in-chief of the Royal Thai Army.

He was transferred from the army to become a special advisor to the Supreme Command Headquarters under the administration of Prime Minister Chuan Leekpai. In August 2001, Chaiyasit was promoted to deputy commander of the Armed Forces Development Command. In August 2002, he was promoted to the post of deputy commander-in-chief.

As a cousin of Prime Minister Thaksin Shinawatra, his unexpected appointment was criticised as an act of nepotism. Both Chaiyasit and the Defence Minister, General Chavalit Yongchaiyudh, denied accusations of nepotism: "If I'm appointed to a significant post in the Army because of my connection with the prime minister, I won't have any friends left in the armed forces," said Chaiyasit. He said that Thaksin would not interfere with any high-level military reshuffles: "It's a shame that the prime minister's name was tainted by such a groundless rumour."

He replaced General Surayud Chulanont, who was promoted to become supreme commander of the Royal Thai Armed Forces, as commander-in-chief in August 2003.

He was replaced as army chief in 2004, succeeded by Prawit Wongsuwan, and was transferred to Supreme Command. Chaisit was then replaced as supreme commander in 2005, succeeded by General Ruangroj Mararanont.

== Honours ==
Royal Decorations

- Knight Grand Cordon of the Order of the White Elephant
- Knight Grand Cordon of the Order of the Crown of Thailand
- Freemen Safeguarding Medal - Second Class, Second Category
- Border Service Medal
- Chakra Mala Medal

=== Foreign Honours ===
- Singapore :
  - Darjah Utama Bakti Cemerlang (Tentera)
  - Pingat Jasa Gemilang (Tentera)
- Netherlands :
  - Grand Officer of the Order of Orange-Nassau
