= Charoenchai Hinthao =

Thai military officer

General Charoenchai Hinthao
- เจริญชัย หินเธาว์
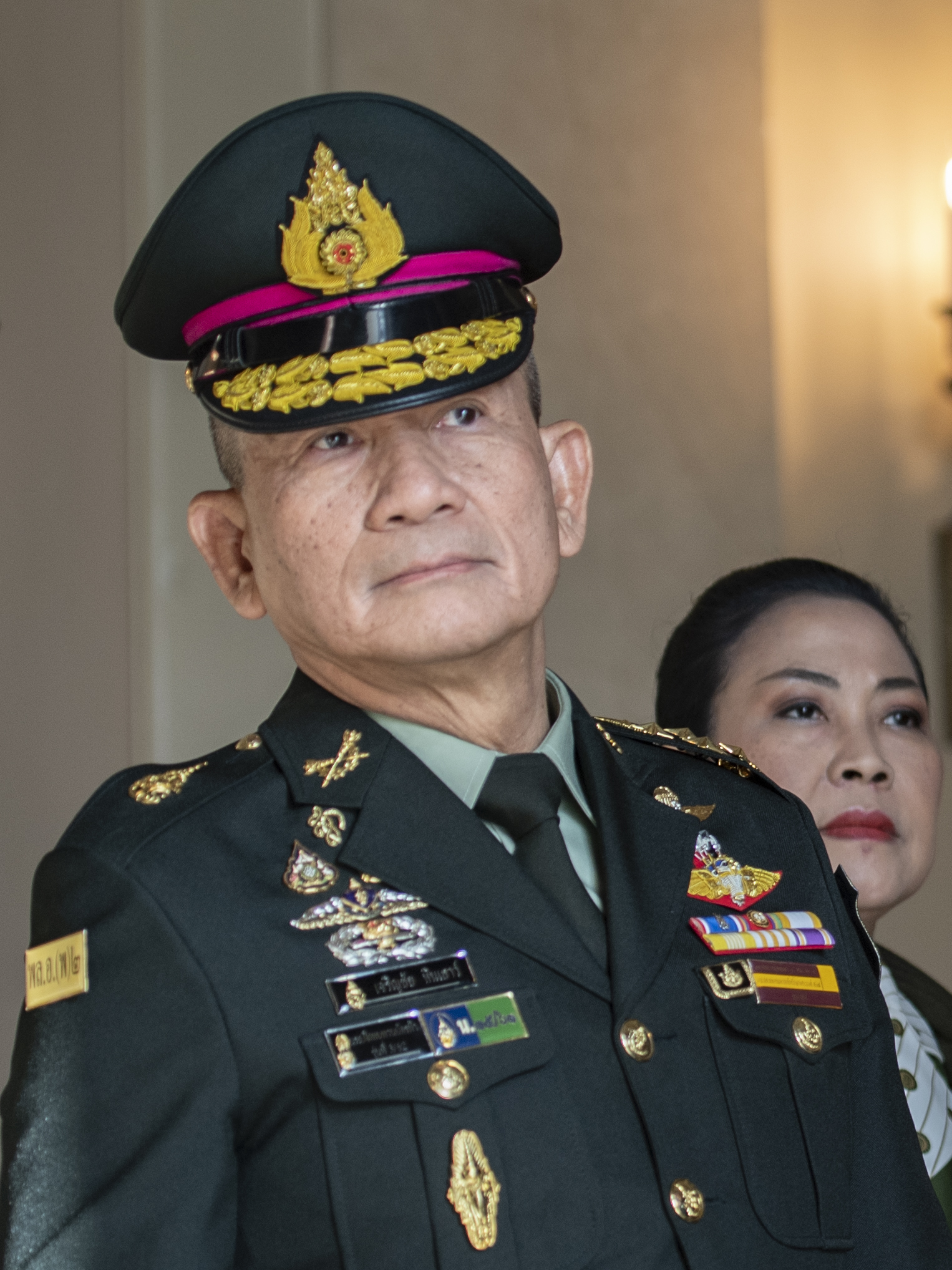

Member of the Senate
- Ex officio 17 December 2023 – 10 July 2024
- Preceded by: Narongphan Jitkaewthae

Commander-in-chief of the Royal Thai Army
- In office 1 October 2023 – 30 September 2024
- Preceded by: Narongphan Jitkaewthae
- Succeeded by: Phana Khlaeoplotthuk

Personal details
- Born: 1 January 1964 (age 62) Lopburi, Thailand
- Spouse: Somthip Krikmathukon
- Education: Royal Military Academy; National Defence College

Military service
- Allegiance: Thailand
- Branch/service: Royal Thai Army
- Rank: General

Charoenchai Hinthao (Thai: เจริญชัย หินเธาว์) is a Thai military officer who served as the commander-in-chief of the Royal Thai Army from 2023 to 2024.

== Education and careers ==
Charoenchai attended the Armed Forces Academies Preparatory School (class 23) as a pre-cadet as a prerequisite for attending Chulachomklao Royal Military Academy (CRMA). After graduating military school, he studied at Command and General Staff College and National Defence College.

Charoenchai started his career in 21st Infantry Regiment, which is granted Royal Guard status as the Queen's Guards.

He began as a rifle platoon leader in the 1st Infantry Battalion, 21st Infantry Regiment, King's Guard. He then rose through the ranks of the military, becoming the Commander of the 21st Infantry Regiment, Royal Guard, and subsequently appointed as Commander of the 2nd Infantry Division and then Commander of the 1st Army Region. He subsequently transferred to the Royal Thai Army Headquarters, serving as Assistant Commander-in-Chief of the Army, Deputy Commander-in-Chief of the Army and finally Commander-in-Chief of the Army in 2023.

== Honours ==
=== Thai honours ===
- Knight Grand Cordon of the Order of the White Elephant
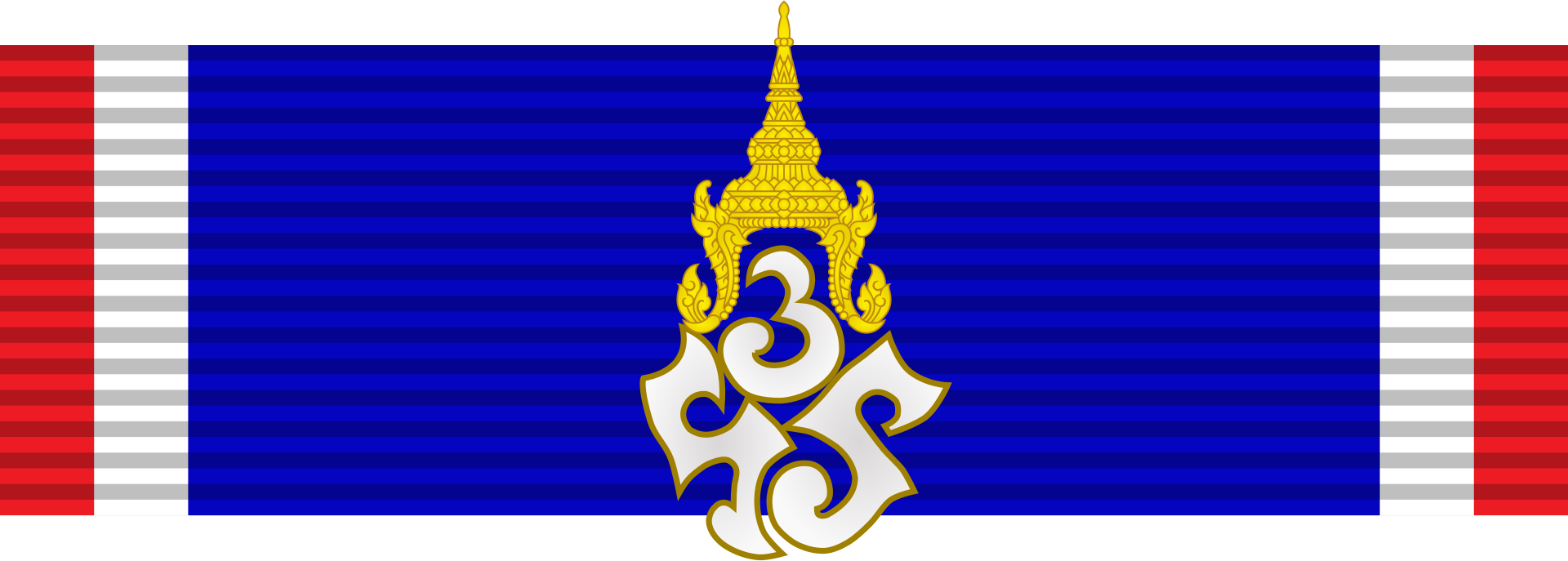
- Knight Grand Cordon of the Order of the Crown of Thailand
- Freemen Safeguarding Medal, Second Class Second Category
- Border Service Medal
- Chakra Mala Medal

=== Foreign honours ===
- Pingat Jasa Gemilang (Tentera)
