= Phana Khlaeoplotthuk =

Thai military officer

General Phana Khlaeoplotthuk PCh PM
- พนา แคล้วปลอดทุกข์
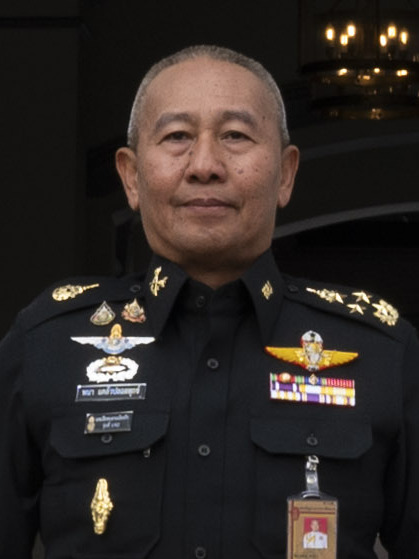

Commander-in-chief of the Royal Thai Army
- Incumbent
- Assumed office 1 October 2024
- Preceded by: Charoenchai Hinthao

Personal details
- Born: 1 February 1967 (age 59) Ban Mo, Phrom Buri, Sing Buri, Thailand
- Spouse: Suphattra Khlaeoplotthuk
- Children: 1
- Parent: Preecha Khlaeoplotthuk (father)
- Education: Royal Military Academy; National Defence College
- Nickname: Pu

Military service
- Allegiance: Thailand
- Branch/service: Royal Thai Army
- Rank: General
- Commands: 1st Army Region; Royal Thai Army
- Battles/wars: 1999 East Timorese crisis 2025 Cambodia–Thailand border conflict: 2025 Cambodia–Thailand clashes

Phana Khlaeoplotthuk (Thai: พนา แคล้วปลอดทุกข์) is a Thai military officer who has served as the commander-in-chief of the Royal Thai Army since 1 October 2024.

== Early life and education ==
Phana was born in Phrom Buri, Sing Buri, 1967. He is a son of General Preecha Klaewplodtook, A former Special Advisor to the Royal Thai Army and former Director-General of the Army Training Command and Suphattra Khlaeoplotthuk.

He attended Armed Forces Academies Preparatory School (class 26) and Chulachomklao Royal Military Academy (class 37).

== Careers ==
Phana previously served as a lecturer at Chulachomklao Royal Military Academy, commander of the 1st Infantry Battalion, 31st Infantry Regiment, King Bhumibol's Guard, and commander of the 11th Infantry Division, respectively. He was part of the Wong Thewan factions, a group of officers who rose through the ranks of the 1st Division.

In 2022, He was appointed as Commander of the 1st Army Area after being selected to undergo training in the Royal Guard course of the King's Close Bodyguard Command, Royal Security Command. He was then appointed Chief of Staff of the Army and Commander-in-Chief of the Riyal Thai Army, succeeding General Charoenchai Hinthao.

== Honours ==
=== Thai honours ===
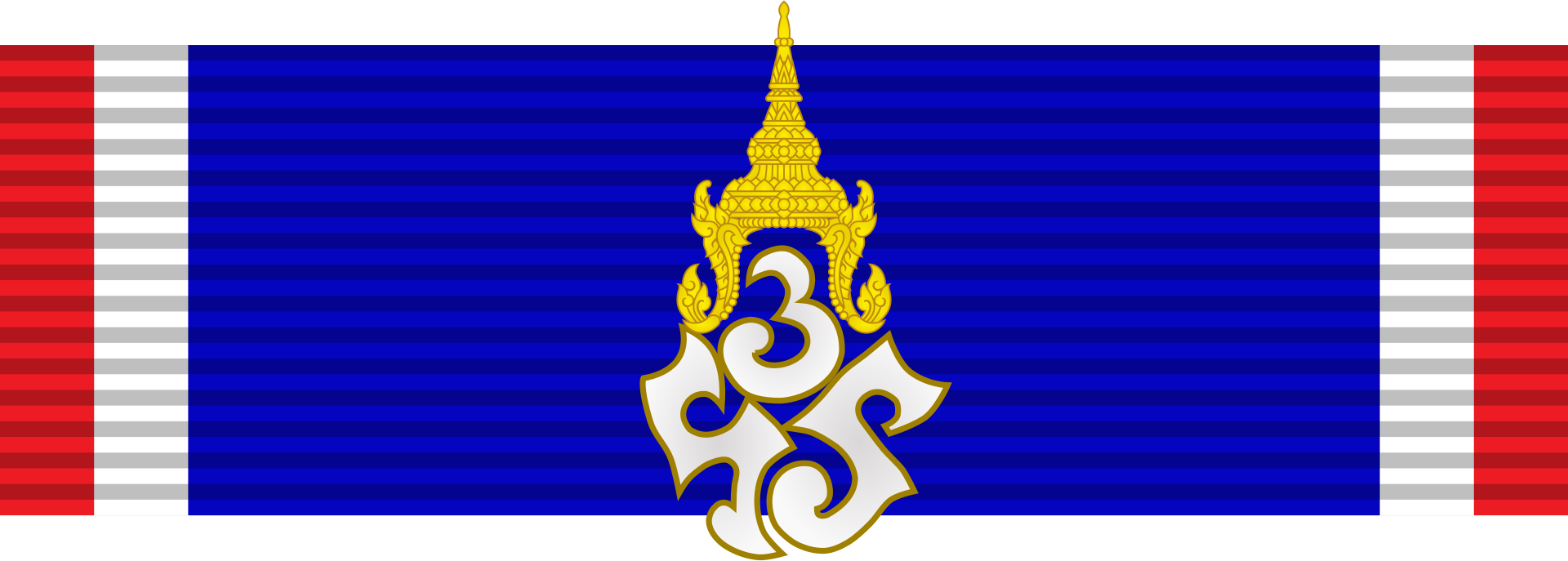
- 2025 – Knight Grand Cordon(Special Class) of The Most Noble Order of the Crown of Thailand
- 2023 – Knight Grand Cross (First Class) of The Most Exalted Order of the White Elephant
- 2017 – Freemen Safeguarding Medal (Second Class, Second Category)
- 2012 – Border Service Medal
- 2001 – Chakra Mala Medal

=== Foreign ===
- Commander of the Legion of Merit (2026)

=== International organizations honours ===
- United Nations Medal (UNAMET) (2000)
