= Chalermchai Sitthisart =

Thai military officer and general

Chalermchai Sitthisart MPCh MWM PC
- เฉลิมชัย สิทธิสาท
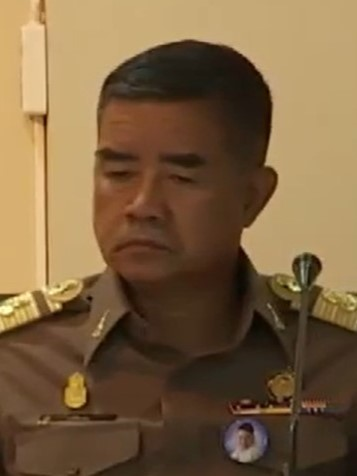

Privy Councillor
- Incumbent
- Assumed office 2 October 2018
- Monarch: Vajiralongkorn

Commander-in-chief of the Royal Thai Army
- In office 1 October 2016 – 30 September 2018
- Preceded by: Thirachai Nakwanich
- Succeeded by: Apirat Kongsompong

Personal details
- Born: 20 October 1957 (age 68) Bangkok, Thailand
- Spouse: Benjawan Sitthisart
- Children: 2
- Education: Chulachomklao Royal Military Academy; National Defence College

Military service
- Allegiance: Thailand
- Branch/service: Royal Thai Army
- Years of service: 1980–2018
- Rank: General
- Commands: Commander in Chief (Army)
- Battles/wars: Khmer Rouge insurgency Communist insurgency in Thailand
- Awards: Freemen Safeguarding Medal (Second Class, Second Category); Border Service Medal; Chakra Mala Medal; Pingat Jasa Gemilang (Tentera)

General Chalermchai Sitthisart PC (Thai: เฉลิมชัย สิทธิสาท) is a retired Thai military officer and general within the Royal Thai Army. In September 2016, he was chosen to serve as the Commander in Chief of the Royal Thai Army, and was endorsed by then-King Bhumibol Adulyadej. Sitthisart was appointed to replace the retiring Thirachai Nakwanich, with his appointment taking effect on October 1.

Chalermchai start working after graduated from the military school at Royal Thai Army Special Warfare Command as a special operations force officer so that Chalermchai's appointment marked a departure from the Burapha Payak royalist military faction - known as the "Eastern Tigers", as he is considered to not have ties with the dominant faction.

== Education and careers ==
Chalermchai study in primary and secondary at Benjamaratrangsarit school at Chachoengsao Province and then attending the Armed Forces Academies Preparatory School as a pre-cadet as a prerequisite for attending Chulachomklao Royal Military Academy (CRMA), Class 16. After graduated in Military school, he studies at Command and General Staff College and National Defence College.

In 1981, after choosing to serve with the Pa Wai Paratrooper Special Forces unit—then designated as the Special Forces (Paratrooper) Division under Special Warfare Command—he was appointed as the Deputy Commander of a Special Forces Operational Team, holding the rank of Second Lieutenant. During this period, he conducted field operations in Cambodia for Cambodian Civil War, engaging in counter-communist, unconventional warfare. His duties involved organizing resistance groups and guerrilla factions to support main combat forces while operating covertly within the territory held by the Three Khmer Factions. In addition, he participated in operations against the communist insurgency in Thailand.

He advanced through the ranks of the Special Warfare Command, holding positions such as Chief of Staff of the Special Warfare Command and then become Commander of the 1st Special Forces Division and Commander of the Special Warfare Command.

Then he moved to Royal Thai Army Headquarters as position of Assistant Commander-in-Chief and finally serve at the position of Commander-in-Chief of Royal Thai Army from 2016 to 2018.

== Royal careers ==
Almost immediately following his retirement, he was appointed to the Privy Council.

== Honours ==
=== Royal Decorations ===
- Knight Grand Cordon of the Most Exalted Order of the White Elephant
- Knight Grand Cordon of the Most Noble Order of the Crown of Thailand
- Knight Commander of the Most Illustrious Order of Chula Chom Klao
- Freeman Safeguarding Medal, 2nd Class 2nd Cat
- Border Service Medal
- Chakra Mala Medal
- King Rama X Royal Cypher Medal, 3rd Class

=== Foreign Honours ===
- Singapore :
  - Pingat Jasa Gemilang (Tentera)
- USA :
  - Commander of the Legion of Merit

Military offices
Preceded by Thirachai Nakwanich	Commander-in-Chief of the Royal Thai Army; 2016–2018	Succeeded by Apirat Kongsompong
