= Kobsak Sabhavasu =

Thai politician (born 1949)

- กอร์ปศักดิ์ สภาวสุ
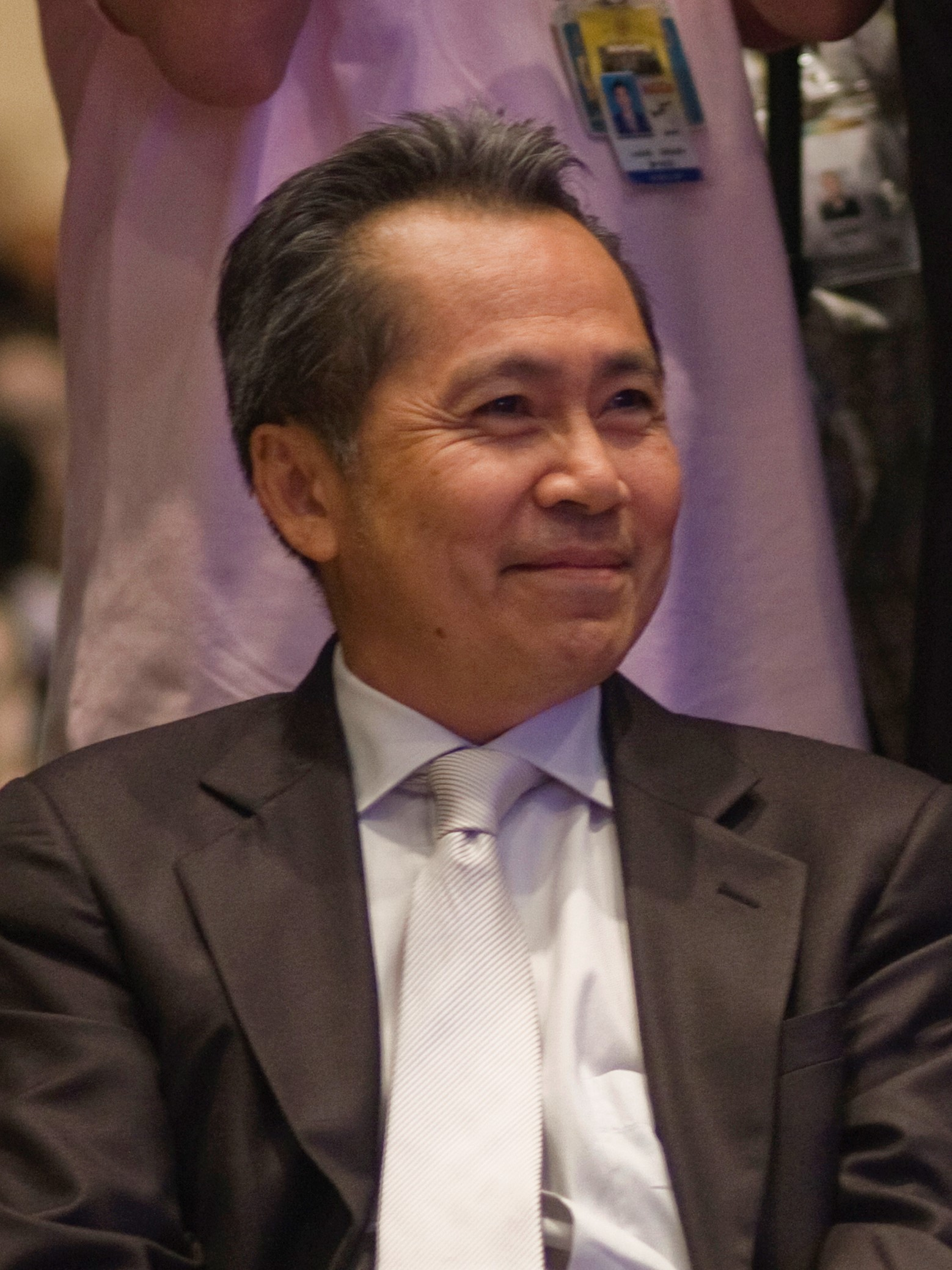
- Kobsak Sabhavasu in 2010

Deputy Prime Minister of Thailand
- In office 20 December 2008 – 11 January 2010
- Prime Minister: Abhisit Vejjajiva

Secretary-General to the Prime Minister
- In office 11 January 2010 – 31 December 2010
- Prime Minister: Abhisit Vejjajiva
- Preceded by: Nipon Prompan
- Succeeded by: Anchalee Wanit Teppabut

Personal details
- Born: March 28, 1949 (age 77) Khlong Toei, Bangkok, Thailand
- Party: Kla Party
- Other political affiliations: Democrat Party (until 2019)
- Spouse: Chusri Sabhavasu
- Education: California Polytechnic State University
- Profession: Politician

Kobsak Sabhavasu (Thai: กอร์ปศักดิ์ สภาวสุ, born 28 March 1949) is a Thai politician and former Deputy Prime Minister.

== Education ==
- Saint Gabriel's College
- California Polytechnic State University
- Stanford University

== Political careers ==
In 2009, Kobsak and Korn Chatikavanij spoke in support of an economic stimulus plan proposed by Prime Minister Abhisit Vejjajiva. During the speech, Kobsak said that country's unemployment rate could be expected to remain at 2-2.5% until 2010.

In 2014, Kobsak urged the country's Anti Money Laundering Office to focus on bringing criminal suspects to justice rather than on investigating perceived enemies of Prime Minister Thaksin Shinawatra.

== Honours ==
=== Royal decorations ===
Kobsak has received the following royal decorations in the Honours System of Thailand:

- 1999 Knight Grand Cordon (Special Class) of the Most Exalted Order of the White Elephant
- 1998 Knight Grand Cordon (Special Class) of the Most Noble Order of the Crown of Thailand
