= Prawit Wongsuwon =

Thai politician and military officer (born 1945)

Prawit Wongsuwon MPCh MWM TChW
- ประวิตร วงษ์สุวรรณ
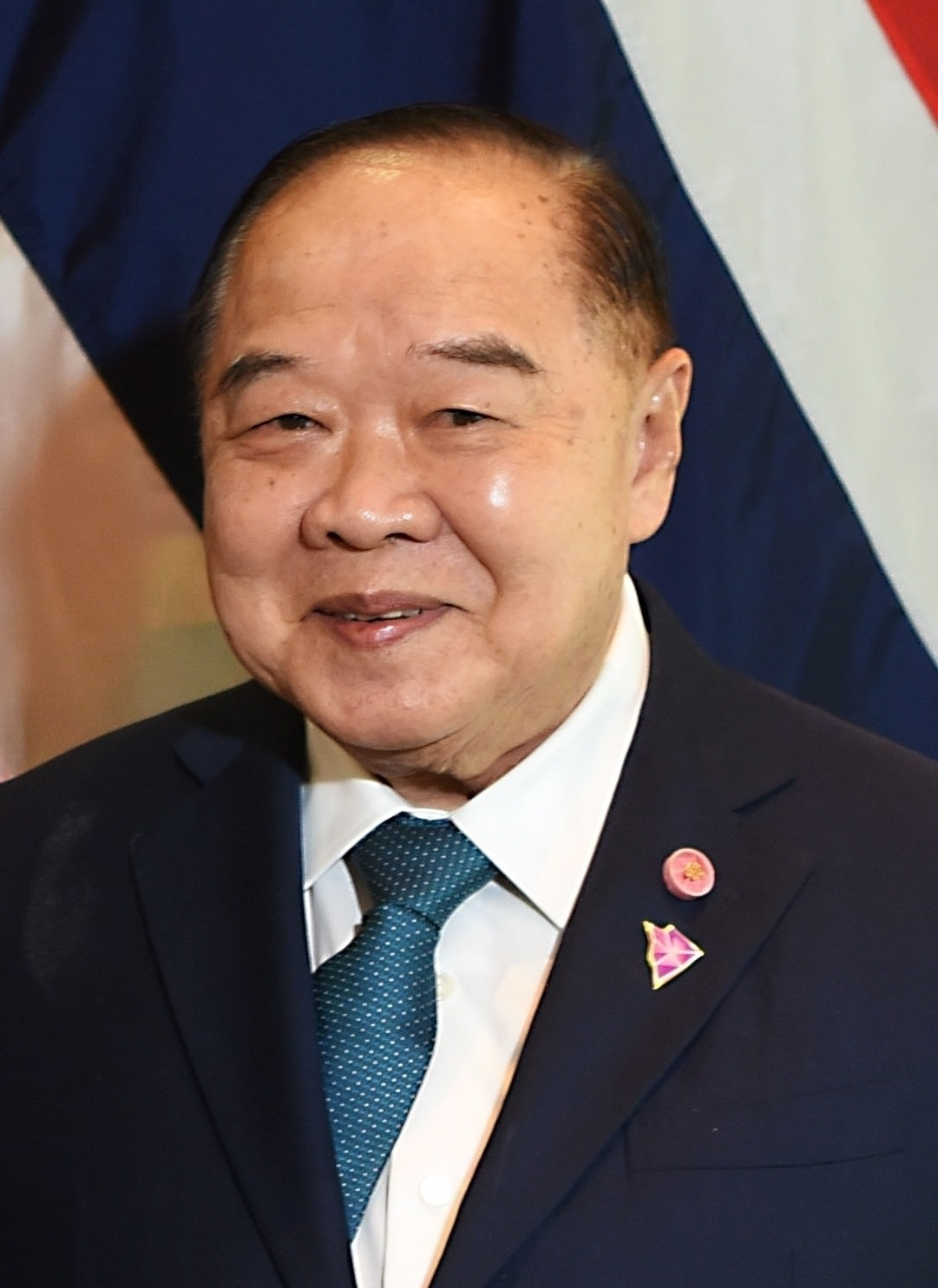
- Prawit in 2018

Acting Prime Minister of Thailand
- In office 24 August 2022 – 30 September 2022
- Monarch: Vajiralongkorn
- Preceded by: Prayut Chan-o-cha (Note: Prayut Chan-o-cha was suspended by the Constitutional Court for exceeding his term limit.)
- Succeeded by: Prayut Chan-o-cha (Note: The Constitutional Court later ruled that Prayut’s term would end in 2025, allowing him to resume office.)

Deputy Prime Minister of Thailand
- In office 30 August 2014 – 1 September 2023
- Prime Minister: Prayut Chan-o-cha; Himself (acting)

Minister of Defence
- In office 30 August 2014 – 10 July 2019
- Prime Minister: Prayut Chan-o-cha
- Preceded by: Yingluck Shinawatra
- Succeeded by: Prayut Chan-o-cha
- In office 20 December 2008 – 9 August 2011
- Prime Minister: Abhisit Vejjajiva
- Preceded by: Somchai Wongsawat
- Succeeded by: Yuthasak Sasiprapha

Leader of the Palang Pracharath Party
- In office 27 June 2020 – 5 January 2026
- Preceded by: Uttama Savanayana
- Succeeded by: Trinuch Thienthong

Member of the House of Representatives
- In office 14 May 2023 – 12 December 2025
- Constituency: Party-list

President of National Olympic Committee of Thailand
- In office 5 April 2017 – 4 December 2024
- Preceded by: Yuthasak Sasiprapha
- Succeeded by: Pimol Srivikorn

Commander-in-Chief of the Royal Thai Army
- In office 1 October 2004 – 30 September 2005
- Preceded by: Chaiyasit Shinawatra
- Succeeded by: Sonthi Boonyaratglin

Personal details
- Born: 11 August 1945 (age 81) Bangkok, Thailand
- Party: Palang Pracharath (2019–present)
- Education: Chulachomklao Royal Military Academy; National Defence College of Thailand
- Nickname: Pom (ป้อม)

Military service
- Branch/service: Royal Thai Army
- Years of service: 1969–2005
- Rank: General
- Commands: Royal Thai Army
- Battles/wars: Vietnam War; Laotian Civil War; Communist insurgency in Thailand

Prawit Wongsuwon (Note: Thai: ประวิตร วงษ์สุวรรณ, RTGS: Prawit Wongsuwan, pronounced [prà.wít wōŋ.sù.wān]) (born 11 August 1945) is a Thai politician and retired military officer who served as the Deputy Prime Minister of Thailand from 2014 to 2023, Minister of Defence from 2008 to 2011 during the government of Prime Minister Abhisit Vejjajiva and from 2014 to 2019 in the first government of Prime Minister Prayut Chan-o-cha. He also previously served as the deputy chairman of the National Council for Peace and Order (NCPO), a military junta which ruled Thailand from 2014 to 2019. From 2004 to 2005 he was the commander-in-chief of the Royal Thai Army (RTA).

In 2022, he briefly became acting prime minister of Thailand after Prayut was briefly suspended from carrying out his duties as Prime Minister of Thailand by the Constitutional Court of Thailand after the court agreed to take up the case on whether Prayut had exceeded the constitutional term limit for the office of prime minister. The Constitutional Court of Thailand later ruled on 30 September 2022 that Prayut had not exceeded his term limit and may continue to serve as prime minister. Prayut was thereafter able to resume carrying out duties as prime minister as a result of the court ruling and Prawit ceased to be the acting prime minister of Thailand on the same date of the court ruling.

== Life and career ==
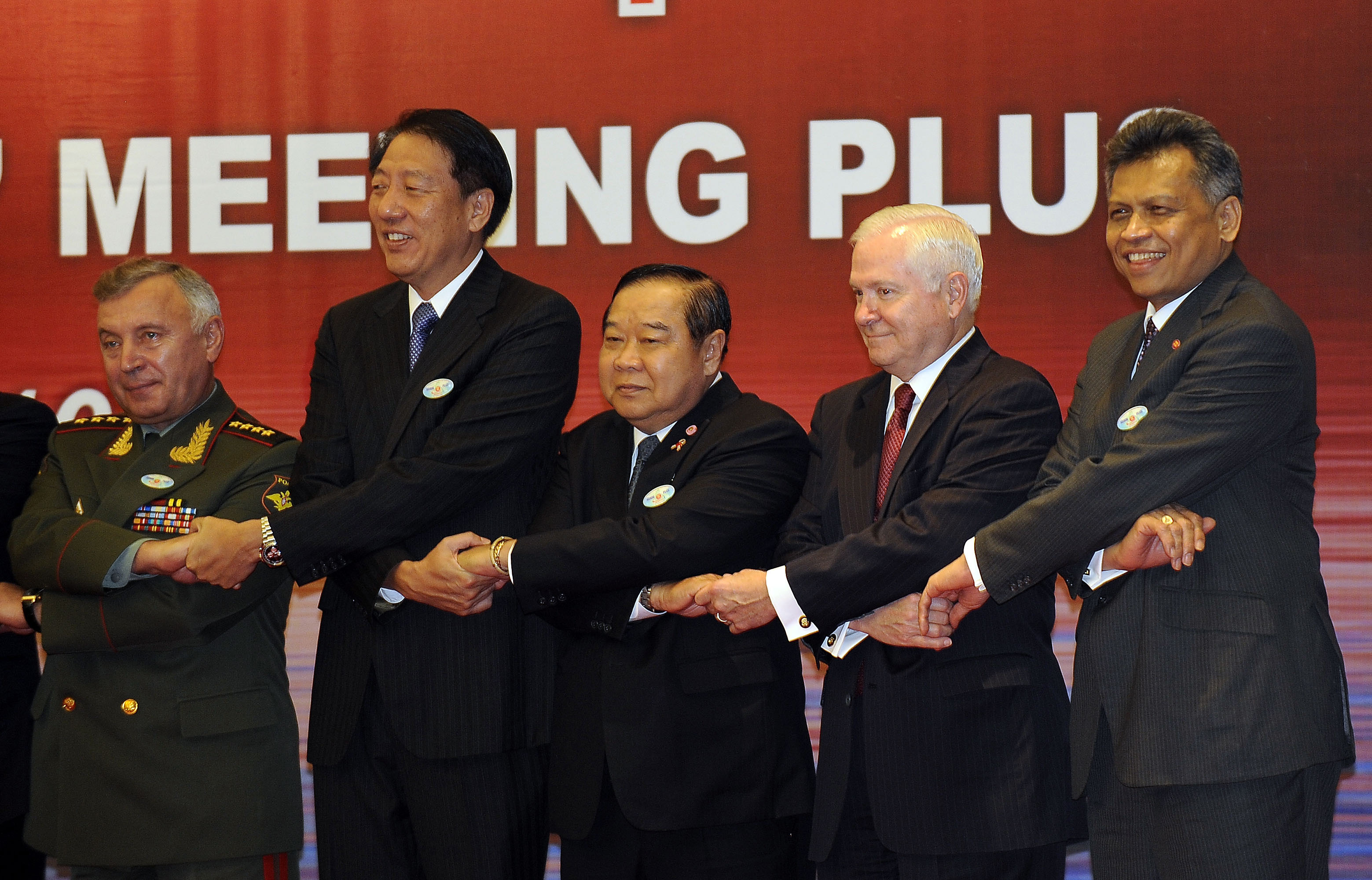
The 2010 ASEAN Defense Ministers Meeting Plus, Prawit Wongsuwan (center)

Prawit's father was Major General Prasert Wongsuwan. He has four younger brothers: the Senator Admiral Sithawat Wongsuwan; Police General Patcharawat Wongsuwan (the former Commissioner-General of the Royal Thai Police); former jewelry and watch repair technician, deceased football manager Pongphan Wongsuwan; and Phanpong Wongsuwan.

Prawit attended Saint Gabriel's College and Armed Forces Academies Preparatory School (class 6, graduated 1965). After graduating from Chulachomklao Royal Military Academy (class 17) in 1969, he became an officer in the 21st Infantry Regiment (Queen's Guard), 2nd Infantry Division. In 1978, he completed the Thai Command and General Staff course. After a failed coup in April 1981, he led in turn both the 2nd and 12th regiments of the 2nd Infantry Division. In 1992, he was appointed royal aide-de-camp. In 1996 he was promoted to commander of the 2nd Infantry Division. After graduating from the National Defence College of Thailand in 1997, he became deputy commander, and in 1998 commander of the 1st Army Region (responsible for Bangkok and central Thailand). In 2001, he was appointed assistant chief-of-staff responsible for the army's operative branch. He returned to command the 1st Army Region, before being promoted to deputy commander-in-chief of the army in 2003 and commander-in-chief in 2004. After retiring from active military service, he became a judge at the supreme courts-martial. After the 2006 coup d'état, he was appointed a member of the National Legislative Assembly.

In December 2008 Prawit was appointed minister of defence in Abhisit Vejjajiva's cabinet, serving until August 2011. During the 2010 Thai political protests to which the government reacted with declaring a state of emergency and finally a military crackdown, Prawit was the deputy director, after 5 October 2010 director of the Centre for the Resolution of the Emergency Situation.

Prawit is known as the mentor (or "big brother") of a military clique called the "Burapha Payak (tigers of the east)", who typically start their careers in the 2nd Infantry Division based in Prachinburi in eastern Thailand. This group includes former Commander-in-Chief Anupong Paochinda, and his successor Prayut Chan-o-cha. Kasit Piromya, a former Democrat Party MP who served as foreign minister from 2008 to 2011, said that throughout his career, Prawit has mentored Prayut, helping him climb up the ranks. "Prawit was like a big brother," Kasit said. Prawit is often considered a backer of the anti-government protests during the 2013–14 Thai political crisis, cited as a potential leader in coup rumors (which he denied), or as a possible candidate for prime minister in the event that the anti-government movement should succeed.

== 2014 coup d'état ==
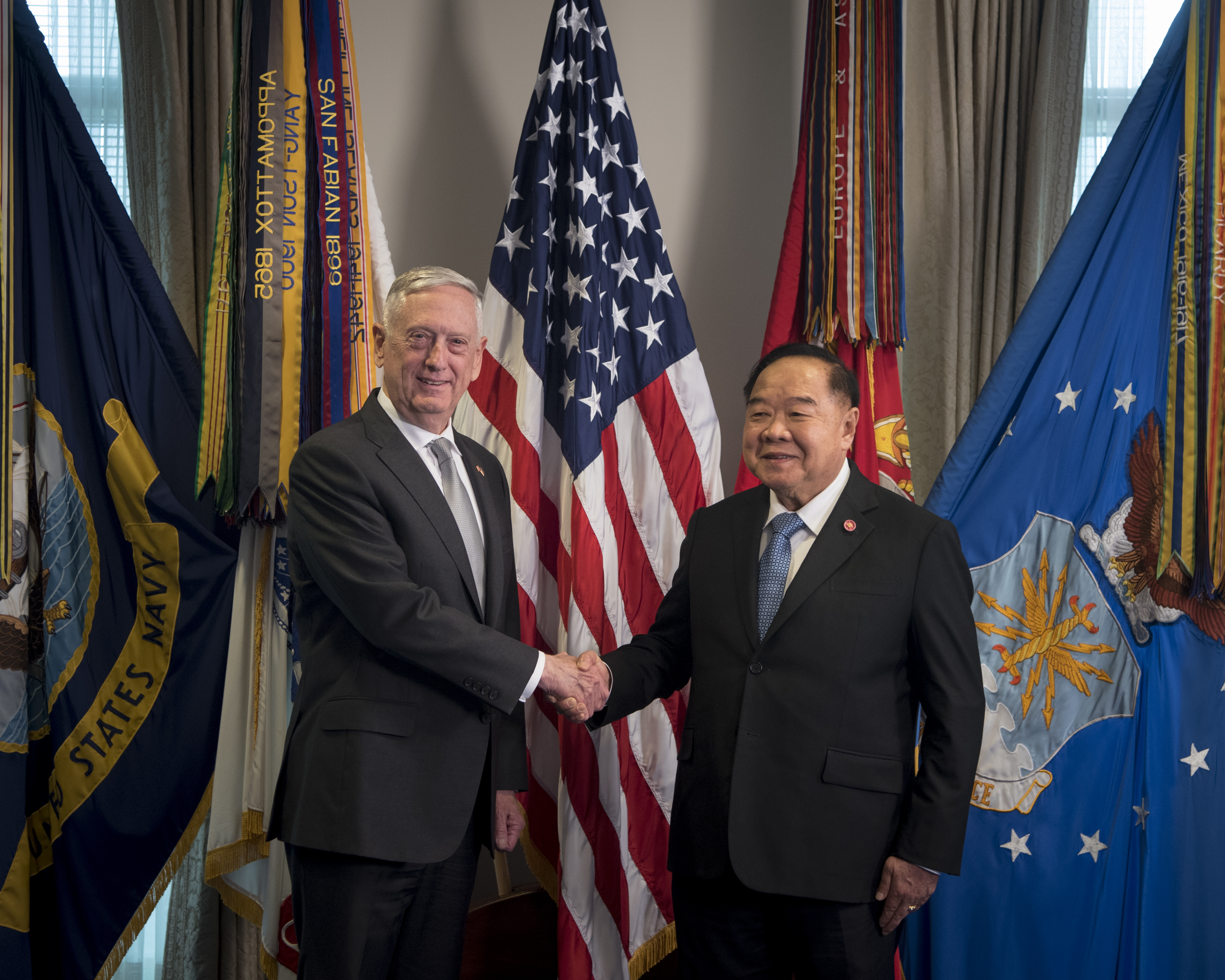
Prawit Wongsuwon with Defense Secretary James Mattis at the Pentagon in Washington, D.C. in 2018

According to Paul Sanderson, writing for New Mandala, Prawit is "widely considered the architect of the 2014 coup".

After the 22 May 2014 coup d'état, the junta appointed Prawit chairman of its "advisory board". On 31 August 2014 he was appointed deputy prime minister and minister of defence in Prayut's cabinet. On 16 September he was also appointed deputy chairman of the National Council for Peace and Order (NCPO). In his multiple roles, Prawit sits on "...more than 50 committees".

== Corruption scandal ==
In December 2017 the National Anti-corruption Commission (NACC) opened an investigation into Prawit's asset disclosures. The NACC gave Prawit until 8 January 2018 to clarify why some Prawit assets, such as the 18 luxury watches that had been identified at the time, were not listed on his mandatory asset declarations when he took office after the 2014 coup d'etat. As more watch disclosures became public, the NACC extended Prawit's deadline to 19 January. On 29 December, Worawit Sukboon, secretary general of the NACC said, "We will investigate this case. It won't take a long time because it's not complicated." By law, political office-holders as well as high-ranking officials must report their assets before assuming their posts and after they leave the posts. They are not required to declare assets while in office. He is said to have filed asset declarations on 22 December 2008 when he became defence minister under Abhisit Vejjajiva; on 10 August 2011 when stepping down from that role; on 9 August 2012, one year after stepping down from his previous role; and on 4 September 2014 when he became deputy prime minister and defence minister. On 6 January the Bangkok Post estimated the value of Prawit's 16 then-known timepieces at "...up to 22M[illion baht]" (US$685,000). Since 6 January an additional nine watches have been identified by the Facebook site, CSI_LA, bringing Prawit's total to 25 timepieces, altogether worth almost 40 million baht. Prawit claims they were all loaned to him by friends. On 9 January 2018, NACC president, Pol Gen Watcharapol Prasarnrajkit, announced he had taken personal charge of the Prawit watch investigation. He promised a "...'professional, transparent' [inquiry], although it will take some time." NACC secretary-general Worawit Sukboon asked the media not to ask about the matter again until "early next month" (February 2018).

The Association to Protect the Thai Constitution, a watchdog group, petitioned the NACC to investigate Prawit for possible false declaration of assets and concealing information that must be declared to the agency. The organisation also accused Prawit of being unusually wealthy under Section 66 of the National Anti-Corruption Act. "Gen Prawit served in the army for about 40 years and was a political office holder for two terms, without any businesses. He could not possibly acquire such a great deal of wealth, a spokesman said. In 2008, Prawit declared assets of 57 million baht. In his 2014 declaration, his assets had risen to 87 million baht.

== Personal life ==
Prawit is single. He enjoys jogging and playing golf in his free time. He is not known to speak, read, or write any language other than Central Thai.

After returning from an event with athletes who had just come back from the 2024 Paris Olympics, a Thai PBS journalist asked Prawit for his opinion on Paetongtarn Shinawatra becoming the 31st Thai Prime Minister. Instead of answering, Prawit lashed out in anger, raised his hand, and struck and harmed the journalist. Complaints were raised over the matter by the Thai Broadcast Journalists Association and the News Broadcasting Council of Thailand. A spokesperson for the Palang Pracharath Party later said that Prawit was teasing the reporter and that he had apologised to her.

== Honours ==
- Thailand :
  - Grand Companion (Third Grade) of the Most Illustrious Order of Chula Chom Klao (2005)
  - Knight Grand Cordon (Special Class) of the Most Exalted Order of the White Elephant (2003)
  - Knight Grand Cordon (Special Class) of the Most Noble Order of the Crown of Thailand (2000)
  - Recipient of the Vietnam War Victory Medal with flames (1973)
  - Recipient of the Freemen Safeguarding Medal, First Class (1982)
  - Recipient of the Border Service Medal (1974)
  - Recipient of the Chakra Mala Medal (1983)
  - Boy Scout Citation Medal of Vajira, First Class (2008)
  - King Rama IX Coronation Medal (1950)
  - 25th Buddhist Century Celebration Medal (1957)
  - Red Cross Medal of Appreciation, First Class (Gold Medal)

=== Foreign honours ===
- Singapore :
  - Pingat Jasa Gemilang (Tentera)
- Laos :
  - Chai Mittraphap Medal
- USA :
  - Army Commendation Medal
- South Vietnam :
  - Vietnam Campaign Medal

==== Unit Citation ====
- Civil Actions Unit Citation

== See also ==
- Rajabhakti Park#Prawit Wongsuwan

Military offices
Preceded by Chaiyasit Shinawatra	Commander-in-Chief of the Royal Thai Army; 2004–2005	Succeeded by Sonthi Boonyaratglin
Political offices
Preceded by Somchai Wongsawat	Minister of Defence; 2008–2011	Succeeded by Yuthasak Sasiprapha
Preceded by Yingluck Shinawatra	Minister of Defence; 2014–2019	Succeeded by Prayut Chan-o-cha
Preceded by Pracha Phromnok	Deputy Prime Minister of Thailand; 2014–2023	Succeeded by Phumtham Wechayachai
Preceded by Prayut Chan-o-cha	Prime Minister of Thailand; Acting; 2022	Succeeded by Prayut Chan-o-cha
Party political offices
Preceded by Uttama Savanayana	Leader of the Palang Pracharath Party; 2020–present	Incumbent
Sporting positions
Preceded by Yuthasak Sasiprapha	President of National Olympic Committee of Thailand; 2017–present	Incumbent
