= Thirachai Nakwanich =

Thai military officer (b. 1955)

Thirachai Nakwanich MPCh MWM
- ธีรชัย นาควานิช
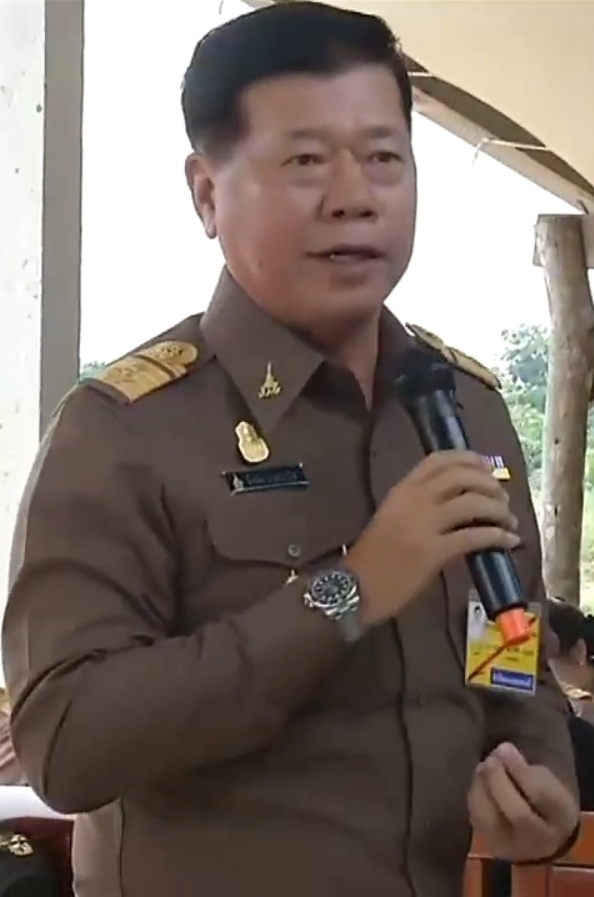
- Thirachai in 2018

Privy Councillor
- In office 6 December 2016 – 19 June 2018
- Monarch: Vajiralongkorn

Commander-in-chief of the Royal Thai Army
- In office 1 October 2015 – 30 September 2016
- Preceded by: Udomdej Sitabutr
- Succeeded by: Chalermchai Sitthisart

Personal details
- Born: 15 November 1955 (age 70) Bangkok, Thailand
- Spouse: Boonraksa Nakwanich
- Children: 2
- Education: Chulachomklao Royal Military Academy; National Defence College

Military service
- Allegiance: Thailand
- Branch/service: Royal Thai Army
- Years of service: 1978–2016
- Rank: General
- Commands: Commander in Chief (Army)
- Battles/wars: Communist insurgency in Thailand
- Awards: Freemen Safeguarding Medal (First Class); Border Service Medal; Chakra Mala Medal; Pingat Jasa Gemilang (Tentera)

General Thirachai Nakawanich PC (Thai: ธีรชัย นาควานิช, born 15 November 1955) is a Thai military officer who served as Commander-in-Chief of the Royal Thai Army from 2015 to 2016. He succeeded Udomdej Sitabutr, with whom he has had a long-running feud, and whose preferred successor would have been Preecha Chan-ocha, brother of Prime Minister and NCPO chief Prayuth Chan-ocha. He was succeeded in 2016 by General Chalermchai Sitthisart upon reaching retirement age.

== Education ==
Thirachai completed secondary education at Patumwan Demonstration School, Srinakharinwirot University. He then decided to go into a military career and proceeded to study at Armed Forces Academies Preparatory School (Class 14) and Chulachomklao Royal Military Academy (Class 25).

== Military career ==
Thirachai started duty in the 2nd Infantry Regiment, Queen Sirikit's Guard knowns as Burapha Payak (Eastern tigers). In 2013, he appointed as commander of the 1st Army Area. Then in 2015 he was appointed as Commander-in-chief of the Royal Thai Army inheriting the position from General Udomdej Sitabutr.

During 2014 Thai coup d'état, He was commander of the peacekeeping force of National Council for Peace and Order.

He used to go to work in the field in the three southern border provinces as the commander of the Narathiwat Special Task Force.

== Royal career ==
In December 2016 he was appointed to the Privy Council by King Vajiralongkorn, but was relieved of his duties in June 2018 for unspecified reasons.
