= List of commanders-in-chief of the Royal Thai Army =

Chief of the Royal Thai Army
- ผู้บัญชาการทหารบก
- Rank flag of the commander-in-chief

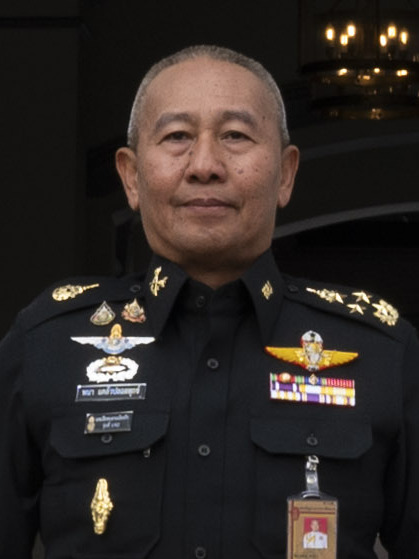
- Incumbent; General Phana Khlaeoplotthuk since 1 October 2024
- Member of: Royal Thai Army
- Reports to: Minister of Defence
- Nominator: Minister of Defence
- Appointer: King of Thailand
- Term length: Until retired
- Inaugural holder: Prince Damrong Rajanubhab
- Formation: 8 April 1887
- Website: Thai Army Commander

The Commander-in-Chief of the Royal Thai Army (Thai: ผู้บัญชาการทหารบก) is headquartered in Bangkok. The commander of the Royal Thai Army is a powerful position that has at times been the springboard to the premiership. Prior to the Siamese revolution of 1932, the post of Commander of the Siamese Army was combined with that of the Kalahom Department. The Commander-in-Chief of the Royal Thai Army is regarded as the most prestigious Thai military position since he commands the largest force of Thailand.

The following individuals have commanded the Royal Thai Army:

== Royal Siamese Army ==
No.	Portrait	Name	Title	Took office	Left office	Time in office
1	Prince Damrong Rajanubhab	General; Prince Damrong Rajanubhab (1862–1943)	Grand-officer to the Army	8 April 1887	15 April 1890	3 years, 7 days
2	Chaophraya Surasakmontri	Field Marshal; Chaophraya Surasakmontri (1862–1943)	Chief of the Army Department	15 April 1890	27 March 1892	1 year, 347 days
3	Prince Bhanubandhu Vongsevoradej	Field Marshal; Prince Bhanubandhu Vongsevoradej (1859–1928)	Chief of the Joint Operations Department	1 April 1892	16 March 1896	3 years, 350 days
4	Prince Narisara Nuwattiwong	General; Prince Narisara Nuwattiwong (1863–1947)	Chief of the Joint Operations Department	16 March 1896	1 April 1899	3 years, 16 days
(3)	Prince Bhanubandhu Vongsevoradej	Field Marshal; Prince Bhanubandhu Vongsevoradej (1859–1928)	Chief of the Joint Operations Department	1 April 1899	8 August 1901	2 years, 129 days
5	Prince of Nakhon Chaisi	Field Marshal; Prince of Nakhon Chaisi (1859–1928)	Chief of the Joint Operations Department; Minister of Defense	8 August 1901	4 February 1913	11 years, 180 days
6	Chaophraya Bodindechanuchit (Arun Chatrakul)	Field Marshal; Chaophraya Bodindechanuchit (Arun Chatrakul) (1856–1921)	Chief of the Joint Operations Department	1 April 1914	25 August 1921 †	7 years, 146 days
7	Chaophraya Bodindechanuchit (Yaem na Nakhon)	General; Chaophraya Bodindechanuchit (Yaem na Nakhon) (1867–1961)	Minister of Defense	1 April 1922	3 August 1926	4 years, 124 days
8	Prince of Nakhon Sawan	Field Marshal; Prince of Nakhon Sawan (1881–1944)	Minister of Defense	3 August 1926	31 March 1928	1 year, 241 days
9	Prince Boworadet	General; Prince Boworadet (1881–1944)	Minister of Defense	25 October 1928	16 June 1931	2 years, 234 days
10	Prince of Singha	General; Prince of Singha (1881–1944)	Minister of Defense	8 November 1931	28 June 1932	233 days

== Royal Thai Army ==
No.	Portrait	Rank	Name	Took office	Left office
11 (1)		Colonel	Phraya Phahon Phonphayuhasena (Phot Phahonyothin)	1932	1938
12 (1)		Major General (until 1941) Field Marshal (after 1941)	Luang Phibunsongkhram (Plaek Phibunsongkhram)	1938	1944
13		Lieutenant General	Phichit Kriangsakphichit	6 August 1944	24 August 1944
11 (2)		General	Phraya Phahon Phonphayuhasena (Phot Phahonyothin)	1944	1946
14		General	Adul Aduldejaraj (Bhat Peungprakhun)	1946	1947
12 (2)		Field Marshal	Luang Phibunsongkhram (Plaek Phibunsongkhram)	1947	1948
15		General	Phin Choonhavan	1948	1954
16		General	Sarit Thanarat	1954	1963
17		General	Thanom Kittikachorn	1963	1964
18		General	Praphas Charusathien	1964	1973
19		General	Kris Sivara	1973	1975
20		General	Boonchai Bamroongpong	1975	1976
21		General	Serm Na Nagara	1976	1978
22		General	Prem Tinsulanonda	1978	1981
23		General	Prayut Jarumanee	1981	1982
24		General	Arthit Kamlang-ek	1982	1986
25		General	Chavalit Yongchaiyudh	1986	1990
26		General	Suchinda Kraprayoon	1990	1992
27		General	Isarapong Noonpakdee	7 April 1992	31 July 1992
28		General	Vimol Vongvanich	1992	1995
29		General	Pramon Plasindhi	1995	1996
30		General	Chettha Thannajaro	1996	1998
31		General	Surayud Chulanont	1998	2002
32		General	Somtat Attanand	2002	2003
33		General	Chaiyasit Shinawatra	2003	2004
34		General	Prawit Wongsuwon	2004	2005
35		General	Sonthi Boonyaratglin	2005	2007
36		General	Anupong Paochinda	2007	2010
37		General	Prayut Chan-o-cha	2010	2014
38		General	Udomdej Sitabutr	2014	2015
39		General	Thirachai Nakwanich	2015	2016
40		General	Chalermchai Sitthisart	2016	2018
41		General	Apirat Kongsompong	2018	2020
42		General	Narongphan Jitkaewthae	2020	2023
43		General	Charoenchai Hinthao	2023	2024
44		General	Phana Khlaeoplotthuk	2024	Incumbent

== See also ==
- Royal Thai Armed Forces
- Highest Commander of the Royal Thai Armed Forces
- Chief of Defence Forces (Thailand)
- List of commanders-in-chief of the Royal Thai Navy
- List of commanders-in-chief of the Royal Thai Air Force
