= 2006 Bangkok bombings =

Terrorist incident in Thailand

- Part of the South Thailand insurgency
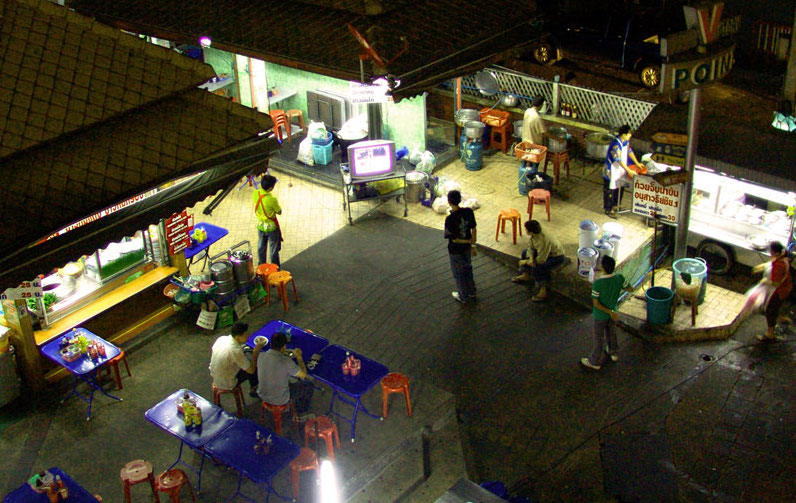
- Citizens nearby the Victory Monument, the site of an explosion, watching the TV news shortly after the blast
- Location: Bangkok, Thailand
- Date: 31 December 2006 – 1 January 2007; 18:00 – 00:05 (UTC+7)
- Target: 9 locations (map) : • Bus stop (Victory Monument) • Police post (Saphan Khwai, Phaya Thai District) • Seacon Square shopping mall • Market (Khlong Toei district) • Khae Rai intersection (Nonthaburi Province) • Police box (Sukhumvit Soi 62) • Restaurant (Khlong Saen Saeb, Pratunam Pier, near CentralWorld) • Telephone booth (CentralWorld) • Major Cineplex Ratchayothin cinema and shopping mall
- Attack type: Multiple bombings
- Deaths: 3
- Injuries: ~ 38

The 2006 Bangkok bombings occurred on 31 December 2006 and 1 January 2007, during New Year's Eve festivities in Bangkok, Thailand. Four explosions went off almost simultaneously in different parts of the city at around 18:00 local time (11:00 UTC), followed by several more explosions within the next 90 minutes. Two explosions also occurred after midnight. In total, eight explosions were reported during the night.

As of 1 January 2007, three people were confirmed dead and more than 38 injured. One additional bomb exploded inside a cinema, but went unreported until the next day due to fears of negative publicity. The next morning, a bomb exploded in a mosque in Chiang Mai, the largest city in northern Thailand. Authorities ordered all public New Year's Eve events cancelled, including the countdown at the CentralWorld shopping center and the alms-giving at Sanam Luang.

Chiang Mai police claimed the Chiang Mai mosque's janitor confessed to making that bomb, and a man was arrested in Bangkok for carrying an explosive device. However, no one has ever claimed responsibility for the Bangkok bombings. Prime Minister Surayud Chulanont blamed the "old power clique" as the group responsible for the bombings, referring to the deposed government of Thaksin Shinawatra as well as all those who had lost political power due to the 2006 military coup. Both the Thai Rak Thai party and deposed Premier Thaksin Shinawatra denied involvement. Surayud later backtracked and admitted that his claim that Thaksin-allies were responsible "was just an intelligence analysis" and was based on no solid evidence or information.

The initials "IRK" were found written in marker in four places at three bomb sites. The IRK is an Afghanistan-trained urban guerrilla terrorism unit. Interior Minister Aree Wong-araya shrugged off suggestions that those responsible were Muslim terrorists. A meeting between Premier Surayud Chulanont and various security and intelligence agencies on the evening of 31 December failed to officially identify those for the attacks.

On 1 January, Surayud announced that although the bombs had similar designs to those used by insurgents in Thailand's Muslim-dominated Southern provinces, closer inspection indicated no link, saying "I don't think they would come here as they could get lost in Bangkok." Police arrested more than a dozen individuals, including several military officers, on suspicion of being involved in the bombings. Junta-leader General Sonthi Boonyaratglin, himself a Muslim, claimed all of the military officers were innocent.

A police investigation later determined that southern separatists were actually behind the bombings. Detonation circuits and other materials used to make the bombs were identical to those used by the Islamic insurgents. However, the junta downplayed the role of the southern separatists, claiming they had been hired by people connected to the political turmoil in Bangkok.

== Bombings ==
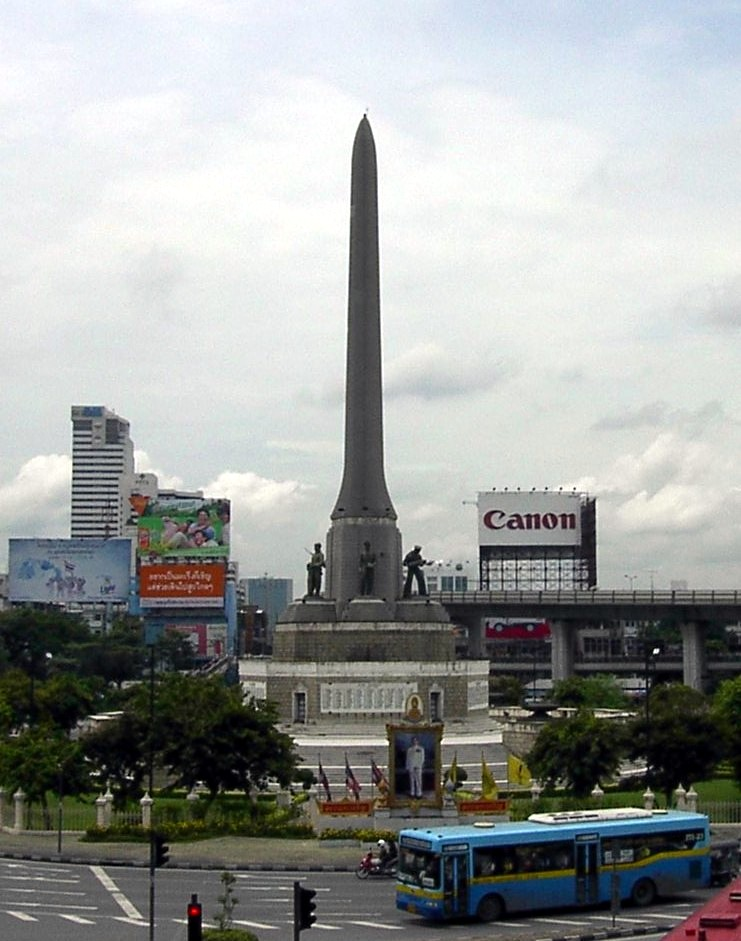
Victory Monument, a busy public transportation hub, was the site of one of the blasts.

Six explosive charges went off almost simultaneously in the early evening in Bangkok, killing three and injuring 38, as Thais were about to start celebrating New Year's Eve.

- Victory Monument. Seventeen people were injured and two died of their injuries. One foreigner, a Hungarian, was among the injured. The bomb had been placed in a bus-stop shelter and went off at around 18:00, ripping through the bus stops, shattering windows at a nearby restaurants and sending debris in all directions. A second blast went off nearby shortly afterwards.
- Khlong Toei, near Na Ranong intersection. A bomb hidden in a litter bin close to a Chinese spirit shrine exploded and injured three people, including a 10-year-old girl. A 61-year-old man died at the hospital from his injuries. The blast caused a secondary explosion of several propane gas cylinders that were standing nearby.
- Saphan Khwai intersection, Phaya Thai District. A bomb went off at a police box, injuring two people. Witnesses claimed to have seen a man drop a hand grenade from a pedestrian bridge onto the police box. However, residue of C-4 and TNT explosives were found at the scene.
- Seacon Square, Prawet District. An unexploded bomb was discovered in a trash bin near a gold shop on the first floor of the shopping mall. It was removed to the car park, where it later exploded, creating panic but causing no injuries. Police ordered all shoppers to evacuate the mall, one of Bangkok's largest, and all shops were closed.
- Khae Rai intersection, Mueang district, Nonthaburi Province (13°51′31″N 100°31′15″E). Another police box was bombed, but no injuries were reported.
- Sukhumvit Soi 62. A third police box was bombed at the entrance of the soi, but no injuries were reported.
- Major Cineplex Ratchayothin, Phahonyothin Road, Lat Yao, Chatuchak. A security guard found a suspicious black bag left unattended in a fast food outlet and placed it in a back room. Sometime afterwards, the bomb exploded, causing a blackout in the cineplex's retail area. There were no injuries. The cineplex owner did not alerted Phahonyothin police until later on 1 January, fearing negative publicity.

Because of the attacks, the large New Year's celebrations at CentralWorld and Sanam Luang were cancelled. Bangkok Governor Apirak Kosayothin led a New Year "countdown" more than three hours early at the CentralWorld party, then told everyone to return home.

Two more bombs exploded shortly after midnight, both near CentralWorld. Those injured included two Thais and six tourists: two English, one Irish, and three Serbs.

- Best Sea Foods restaurant near Khlong Saen Saeb's Pratunam Pier and CentralWorld. Three foreign tourists and two Thais dining at the restaurant were injured. One foreigner had a leg blown off by the blast.
- A public telephone booth at the pedestrian bridge linking CentralWorld and Gaysorn shopping malls. Several foreign tourists were injured.
- Police found three more unexploded bombs in the area.

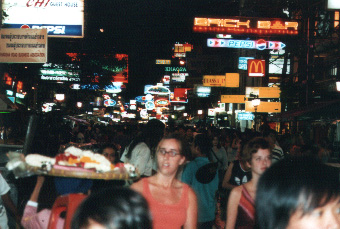
A bomb was reported on Khao San Road, a popular area for foreign backpackers, but none was found.

Police investigated several other incidents:

- A suspected bomb was found at Buddy Beer, a bar on Khaosan Road, about half an hour after midnight. Tourists had already been ordered to leave the area. All Khaosan Road bars and shops were closed, and the street was barricaded and guarded by armed forces. However, the package was found not to be a bomb.
- About 01:00 police disabled a bomb at the Suan Lum Night Bazaar before it could explode.

== Casualties ==
Deaths by nationality
Country	Deaths	Injured
Thailand	3	30
Hungary		3
Serbia		2
United Kingdom		2
United States		1
Total	3	38

The wave of bombings claimed the lives of three people, all Thai nationals. Songkran Kanchana, 36, and Ekkachai Ruangpoom, 26, were both fatally injured at the Victory Monument bus stop, while Suvichai Nak-iam, 61, was killed in the Khlong Toei bombing.

A total of 38 people were injured, including eight foreigners: two British, three Hungarians, two Serbs, and an American.

Location	Deaths	Injuries
Victory Monument	2 Thai	15 (1 Hungarian)
Khlong Toei	1 Thai	6
Saphan Khwai	0	2
Seacon Square	0	0
Khae Rai Intersection (Thai: สี่แยกแคราย)	0	0
Sukhumvit Soi 62	0	0
CentralWorld (seafood restaurant)	0	2 Thais; 3 foreigners
CentralWorld (pedestrian flyover)	0	6 foreigners
Total	3	~38

== Forensic evidence ==
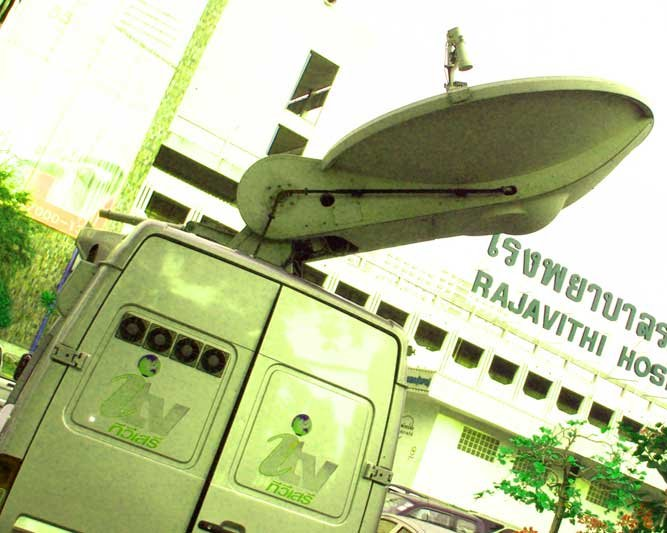
An ITV news van is parked at the Rajavithee Hospital, where most of the victims of the blasts were treated.

Police General Ajiravid Subarnbhesaj claimed that all eight bombs were placed in 3x5-inch boxes and detonated by digital alarm clock. Traces of M4 high explosive booster were found in all of the bombs. Other military ordnance sources claimed the bombs were all ammonium nitrate fuel oil (ANFO)/M4 bombs. This would make the bombs the same type as had been found in a car outside Thaksin Shinawatra's residence in August 2006.

The police were criticised for barring Central Institute of Forensic Science acting director Pornthip Rojanasunand from collecting evidence at a bombing site in Pratunam. Pornthip called the police unprofessional because they mainly focused on the type of bomb that was used, rather than the identity of the bombers, and let city cleaners sweep up the site before the collection of evidence was completed.

Prime Minister Surayud ruled out involvement of Southern insurgents. He claimed that forensic reports showed that the bombs were assembled "to look like those used by the Southern insurgents" but that detailed examination of the explosions and modus operandi indicated no link.

== Responsibility ==
=== Forewarning ===
Authorities had earlier warned of an escalation of the South Thailand insurgency during the New Year holiday.

According to the Thai-language daily Thai Rath, Thai Military Intelligence and the Special Branch received reports that there would be bombs in up to 30 locations in Bangkok and surrounding areas, especially popular shopping malls such as Siam Paragon, The Mall Bang Kapi, and Seacon Square.

=== Urban guerrillas ===
No one ever claimed responsibility for the bombings, and both the Thai Rak Thai Party and deposed Premier Thaksin Shinawatra insisted they were innocent. In the absence of concrete public evidence, theories abounded about those most likely behind the attacks.

The initials "IRK" were found written in four places at three bomb sites: a pillar near a bus stop at Victory Monument, a phone booth near Gaysorn shopping mall opposite CentralWorld, a phone booth near Pratunam Pier, and a phone booth near BigC Ratchadamri. The IRK is an Afghanistan-trained urban guerrilla terrorism unit. However, Interior Minister Aree Wong-araya shrugged off suggestions that those responsible were foreign militants. Senior junta leadership agreed that Muslim terrorists were not involved, and that the initials were meant to implicate the IRK. Police claimed the IRK graffiti was done by teenage gangs to frighten the public.

Junta-leader Sonthi Boonyaratglin claimed he was "more than 100% certain" that the bombings were not perpetrated by southern insurgents and that even in the south, it was "no longer easy to perpetrate attacks". He said the bombings were done by people very well acquainted with the city, and added that even his own soldiers sometimes got lost in Bangkok. He insisted that it was "impossible" that the bombings had been prepared months in advance.

Experts from the Department of Special Investigation noted the technique used was similar to that in the bombing of a Bangkok Bank branch in Amphoe Betong, Yala Province in 2006, where Casio digital watches were used as timers. Stainless steel back covers of 200 and 201 series Casio watches were found at the Bangkok bomb sites.

==== "Old power clique" ====
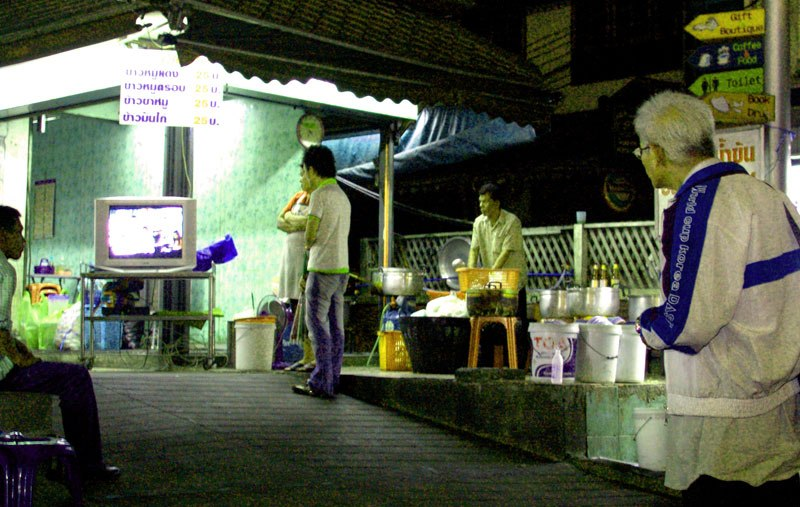
Bangkok residents watch television news coverage of the bombings early in the morning on 1 January 2007.

Members of the ruling junta attributed the bombings to various groups. The day after the bombings, government security sources blamed the "old power clique," a presumed reference to members of the government of deposed Premier Thaksin Shinawatra. Other security sources suggested the bombings might provide a reason for the junta to seize Thaksin's sizeable personal assets. The Thai Rak Thai party denied involvement and warned the junta not to blame them without facts.

Anti-Thaksin newspaper editor Sondhi Limthongkul said he believed the bombings were conducted by "undercurrents", supporters of the deposed government of Thaksin Shinawatra, who wanted to discredit the junta. He gave no evidence.

A meeting between Premier Surayud Chulanont and various security and intelligence agencies late on the night of 31 December failed to identify anyone as behind the attacks.

The next day, however, Surayud announced the bombings had nothing to do with the southern insurgency, since "I don't think they would come here as they could get lost in Bangkok." He claimed that the "old power clique" was the mastermind. "Based on the government's information and intelligence agencies, it was the work of people who lost power, but I cannot clearly say which group was behind it," he said. He claimed he was not referring only to the deposed government of Thaksin Shinawatra, but to all those who had lost political power due to the coup.

Surayud later admitted that his claim that Thaksin allies were responsible "was just an intelligence analysis" and not based on solid evidence or information.

Junta vice-chairman Saprang Kalayanamitr charged, "The evidence and intelligence information proves that the bombs were the dirty work of politicians who lost power and benefits. Some bad soldiers loyal to the bad politicians collaborated with them with the intention to topple this government." He claimed, "the bandits and terrorist groups in southern Thailand had no links or connections to the bombs in Bangkok." Saprang was harshly criticised by Chavalit Yongchaiyudh, a former military officer who was a member of the deposed Thai Rak Thai government. Chavalit dared Saprang to arrest all those behind the bombing. "Saprang Kalayanamitr claimed he already had pertinent information on the bombing, but he failed to take any action. This is gross incompetence," Chavalit said. He said the Council for National Security should examine among its ranks if it truly wanted to solve the case, alluding to speculation that the military had staged the bombing to justify its grab for power.

A public opinion poll conducted by ABAC revealed that a majority of Bangkokians did not believe the junta's claim that the deposed government was behind the bombings. Just 11% said that they had "full confidence" that the government could handle the crisis.

==== Conflicts within the junta ====
A widely circulated theory posited that the Council for National Security itself planted the bombs to strengthen its own hand and discredit Thaksin, who remained highly popular with the public. Junta leader Sonthi denied the rumours on television, saying "I have risked myself to do what the people wished. Why should I do that? I love my people, and my country."

Conflict between junta assistant secretary General Saprang Kalayamitr and First Army Region commander and Lt General Prayuth Chan-ocha were cited as a possible causes of the bombings and the coup rumours. Both men were potential heirs to the leadership of the junta after Sonthi Boonyaratglin would retire in September 2007.

==== Jemaah Islamiyah or southern insurgents ====
Some Thai intelligence officials have stated that they now believe the attacks were orchestrated and carried out by a combined effort between Jemaah Islamiyah and the Patani United Liberation Organisation, contradicting initial announcements by the interim government that the attacks were not likely to have been related to the Southern insurgency. There is a 1,000,000 baht ($35,700 US$) bounty for the arrest of Lohmueli Yusoh (alias Rusdi Pohseng), thought to be the leader of the attack.

Later forensic investigations strengthened the theory that the Bangkok bombs were made using the same signature bomb-building techniques and materials as bombs used by southern insurgents.

== Aftermath ==
=== Further bombings ===
==== 1 January 2007 bombing ====
At 8.45 am on 1 January 2007, a motorcycle rider threw an improvised bomb into a mosque in Chang Klan Road in Chiang Mai, injuring four people, including the Burmese janitor, Nasis Ahamad. Nasis said a grenade had been lobbed in, but an army bomb expert said the blast was caused by the premature explosion of a bomb being built by the mosque janitor.

Police later said that Nasis confessed to carrying the small home-made bomb to the mosque then accidentally dropping it on the floor, causing it to explode. However, police are still investigating Nasis' motive for carrying the bomb, and have not yet charged Nasis, who is still in hospital, with any offence. Police reported their findings to community leaders, but were met with disbelief that a Muslim would bring a bomb into the mosque.

==== 30 January 2007 bombings ====
On 30 January 2007, two explosions were reported in the headquarters of the Daily News newspaper and the Rama Garden Hotel's parking lot at around 1 am. Prime Minister Surayud Chulanont later declared that the explosions were caused by M79 grenades. He also noted that it would not be easy to find the bombers because not much shrapnel was found on the scene.

=== Security measures and junta responses ===
Several foreign embassies issued travel warnings to their citizens in Bangkok warning that further attacks are possible.

The junta ordered the military to the streets of Bangkok to control the situation, with 6,000 checkpoints set up throughout the capital. Army commanders for the North, Northeast, and the South were placed on alert. Bangkok Governor Apirak Kosayothin ordered all 50 districts in Bangkok to collect all their rubbish bins.

Junta head Sonthi Boonyaratglin cut short his hajj and flew back from Saudi Arabia to meet with the junta leadership in the afternoon of 1 January 2007 Later on that same day, assistant police commissioner Jongrak Juthanon was assigned to lead an investigation into the deadly incidents.

The Bangkok Metropolitan Administration initiated plans to spend 186 million baht on installing 1,628 closed-circuit television cameras throughout the capital in 2007, with plans for 504 cameras to be placed on pedestrian and traffic flyover bridges and low-population locations, while 1,124 cameras would be placed in more populated places like bus terminals and intersections.

=== Coup rumours ===
Rumors that the junta would use the bombings as a pretext to overthrow the government of Prime Minister Surayud Chulanont abounded. Junta leader Sonthi went on television to deny the rumours. "We love the people too much to do it," he said.

=== Economic impact ===
The Stock Exchange of Thailand (SET) composite index fell 3.2% the day after the exchange opened after the New Year holiday. Thai shares declined another 1.67% on 4 January 2007. The declines followed massive losses in mid-December after the junta briefly introduced capital controls. The Thai baht weakened slightly, trading at 36.15–17 to one United States dollar, against 36.05-10 at the close of trade on 29 December 2006.

However, Deputy Prime Minister and Finance Minister Pridiyathorn Devakula claimed that the bombings "would not have an impact on this year's GDP."

=== Arrests ===
On 20 January 2007, some 15 military officers and civilians were arrested in commando raids regarding the bombings. Police invoked martial law, which empowered them to detain suspects without placing charges against them for seven days. Among those arrested were Lt. Col. Suchart Khadsungnone, an officer of Sonthi Boonyaratglin's Lopburi-based Special Warfare Command. Reporters who witnessed the questioning said the interrogators demanded the suspects provide alibis during the August 2006 Bangkok car bomb against deposed Premier Thaksin Shinawatra.

The junta was not satisfied with the police investigation and arrests and planned to make a parallel inquiry. Junta head Sonthi warned the police chief not to seek scapegoats in the military. However, the junta's plans to launch a parallel inquiry were reversed after Police Chief Kowit Wattana reported evidence to the junta's leaders. However, Pallop Pinmanee, the former Internal Security Operations Command leader who was implicated in the attempted assassination of Thaksin Shinawatra, warned the junta not to trust the police. Maj-Gen Khattiya Sawasdipol, an influential Army officer echoed Pallop's warning. Junta chief and Army Commander Sonthi Boonyaratglin said he was certain that all military men held by police for the past week were innocent.

On 16 March 2007, the Criminal Court issued an arrest warrant against a tall and thin man aged 25 to 30 with crippled leg, whom police believed had planted a bomb at the Major Ratchayothin shopping center on New Year's Eve. The man was seen on a closed circuit television camera in the shopping mall. The man was charged with possessing an explosive object, terrorism and trying to kill others, and his photo was shown to the media on 21 March 2007.

On 22 March 2007, police posted photographs of two suspects who were caught on closed circuit television at the Seacon Square shopping center. On the evening of 22 March, Pratya Preechavej and Yutthaphong Kittisriworraphan told reporters of The Nation newspaper that they were the men in police photos, but insisted were not the bombers. Both men were taken to a hotel on Sukhumvit Road by several senior officers and held from 10 pm until 2 am. They returned home at 4.30 am the next morning. Their story changed in a subsequent press conference at the Prawet police station, when Pratya claimed he had not worn a black jacket as did one of the men in police photos. Pratya also said he had a ponytail, and he almost never let down his hair – unlike the man in the photo – and had been accompanied by his sister. Junta chief Sonthi Boonyaratglin later said it was a case of mistaken identity, as both men looked similar to the suspected bombers.

== In popular culture ==
- Modernine TV discussed 2006 Bangkok bombings on TimeLine, 26 December 2016, in "Unregulated New Year".

== See also ==
- Council for National Security
- Surayud Chulanont
- South Thailand insurgency
