= Saprang Kalayanamitr =

Royal Thai Army officer (1948–2023)

General Saprang Kalayanamitr

Assistant Secretary-General of the Council for National Security
- In office 19 September 2006 – 7 February 2008
- Preceded by: None

Commander of the Council for National Security Special Operations Center
- In office 1 December 2006 – 7 February 2008
- Preceded by: None

Assistant Commander of the Royal Thai Army
- In office 1 October 2006 – 30 September 2007 Serving with Anupong Paochinda

Personal details
- Born: 8 July 1948 Lampang, Thailand
- Died: 21 November 2023 (aged 75) Bangkok, Thailand
- Party: None
- Spouse: Viphada Kalayanamitr
- Occupation: Military officer

Military service
- Branch/service: Royal Thai Army
- Years of service: 1970–2008
- Rank: General

General Saprang Kalayanamitr (Thai: สพรั่ง กัลยาณมิตร; RTGS: Sa-phrang Kanlayanamit, also known as Poei (Thai: เปย) or Big Poei (Thai: บิ๊กเปย), 8 July 1948 – 21 November 2023) was an officer of the Royal Thai Army, Assistant Secretary-General of the Council for National Security (CNS), Commander of the junta's 14,000-man anti-protest force, chairman of the Board of Directors of Airports of Thailand (AoT), and also Chairman of the Boards of TOT and CAT Telecom, two major Thai state-owned telecommunication companies.

Saprang served for nearly three decades in the army cavalry corps, and was promoted to 3rd Army Region Commander in 2005. He was a key leader of the September 2006 coup that overthrew the government of Prime Minister Thaksin Shinawatra.

Saprang was one of the fiercest critics of Thaksin Shinawatra, calling him a "traitor" and claiming that he should be "banished to live forever in the jungle." Upon appointment to chair AoT and TOT, he purged the management, initiated investigations into the overthrown government, and donated 200 million baht of the agency's funds to the Army. He fired the President of TOT for questioning an 800 million baht donation that the agency made to the Army. As head of CAT Telecom, he was accused of blocking attempts to launch PTV, a new television station founded by ex-leaders of Thaksin's Thai Rak Thai party.

Saprang was considered one of the top contenders to lead the army and the junta after CNS leader Sonthi Boonyaratkalin's mandatory retirement in 2007. However, in September 2007 he was demoted to be Deputy Permanent Secretary of the Defense Ministry, while his rival, General Anupong Paochinda, was promoted to lead the Army. As a result, Saprang retired from the Army in 2008.

== Education and early career ==
=== Education ===
Saprang was born into a military family on 8 July 1948 in Lampang Province. He graduated from the 7th Class of the Armed Forces Academies Preparatory School and the 18th Class of the Chulachomklao Royal Military Academy. His classmates included General Paisan Katanyu (appointed Deputy Army Commander after the coup), Admiral Bannawit Kengrien (appointed to the National Legislative Assembly after the coup, and leader of its Suvarnabhumi Airport committee), and General Lertrat Rattavanich. He later graduated from the 43rd class of the National Defence College of Thailand in 2001. His NDC thesis concerned the role of military forces in the control of illegal narcotics. His NDC classmates included Kraisi Karnasuta, governor of state energy company EGAT.

=== Early career ===
Saprang started his military career in 1969 as rifle platoon leader in the 3rd Infantry Battalion, 4th Regimental Combat Team. He claimed to have fought 200 battles during the course of his military career.

Saprang was appointed commander of the 1st Infantry Battalion of the 4th Infantry Regiment in 1982, stationed in Nakhon Sawan Province (near the northwestern border with Burma). In 1985, he became commander of the 1st Infantry Battalion in the 19th Infantry Regiment, stationed at Surasee Fort, Kanchanaburi (on the western border with Burma).

Saprang was then promoted to Regimental Commanding Officer of the Armed Forces Academies Preparatory School in 1990. In 1991, he began a six-year stint as Regimental Commanding Officer of the Chulachomklao Royal Military Academy.

In April 1997, Saprang was shortly transferred to the Ministry of Defense as a staff officer, before being promoted in October 1997 to Commanding General of the 15th Infantry Division, at the time stationed in Pran Buri, Prachuap Khiri Khan Province. In 2003, he was promoted to 3rd Corps Commander. In 2004, it was strongly rumoured that Saprang might be promoted to command the 4th Army, replacing General Pongsak Ekbannasingh. General Pongsak had been criticized for ineffectually fighting the South Thailand insurgency after 39 successful arson attacks occurred in just one night. Pongsak ended up being replaced in April 2004 by Pisarn Wattanawongkhiri.

=== 2006 Coup ===
In a surprise to many observers, Saprang was promoted to 3rd Army Area Commander in October 2005, headquartered in Phitsanulok and responsible for most of northern and northeastern Thailand. Analysts had expected Prime Minister Thaksin to promote his own classmates from AFAPS Class 10 to the powerful position instead. At the same time, also in a surprise move, Deputy Army Commander Sonthi Boonyaratkalin was promoted to Army Commander.

Saprang and Sonthi started planning for the coup 7 to 8 months in advance, in approximately February 2006. Coup planning occurred prior to the April 2006 elections, during Thaksin's controversial sale of Shin Corporation to Temasek Holdings and the peak of the People's Alliance for Democracy's campaign to oust the government. In July 2006, Saprang gave an interview where he stated that Thai politics was below standard and that the Kingdom's leadership was weak. He also claimed that Thailand had a false democracy. He denied that such criticism constituted military interference in politics. At the same time, the Thai media speculated that in the October 2006 annual Army reshuffle, Saprang would not be promoted to Assistant Army Commander and would not be allowed to retain his position of 3rd Army Area Commander. In July, Saprang's own Deputy Commander in the 3rd Army Area, Major General Manas Paorik, warned the media that "a certain military officer who aspires to become Assistant Army Commander" was planning a coup.

In the weeks leading up to the coup, Saprang openly mobilised soldiers and northern residents to rebel against the government. Saprang played a key role on the evening of 19 September 2006, securing Thaksin's home town and power base of Chiang Mai. That same night, he was appointed assistant Secretary-General of the CNS. The coup was executed just a week before the announcement of the Army's annual reshuffle.

== After the 2006 coup ==
A week after the coup, Saprang was promoted to Assistant Army Commander, alongside fellow coup leader Anupong Paochinda. His predecessor, General Pornchai Kranlert, had not taken part in the coup and was transferred to an inactive position. Saprang was also promoted from Lieutenant General to General.

=== CNS Special Operations Center ===
On 27 December 2006, it was revealed that the Thai Cabinet had approved over half a billion baht worth of funding for a 14,000-man secret, anti-protest, special operations force, of which General Saprang was the commander. The so-called CNS Special Operations Center, funded with 556 million baht diverted from the Defense Ministry, Royal Thai Police, and government emergency reserve fund, had been secretly established by the CNS on 1 December 2006 in order to control protests.

=== TOT and CAT Telecom ===
Saprang was appointed by the junta to become chairman of the Board of Directors of Airports of Thailand (AoT) and also Chairman of the Boards of TOT and CAT Telecom, two major state-owned telecommunication companies. Saprang's first move as TOT Chairman was to hand-pick three Army colonels and vocal Thaksin-critic Vuthiphong Priebjrivat to sit on the state enterprise's board of directors. Saprang transferred TOT President Somkuan Bruminhent to an inactive position and appointed Vuthiphong new president. He then hand-picked all 10 other directors.

Saprang noted in an interview that, "if telecommunication businesses are in private hands, the country won't be safe." The junta had earlier announced plans to cancel the initial public offering of both TOT and CAT Telecom and to merge the two state enterprises.

Under Saprang's leadership, TOT reaffirmed its ownership rights to all existing backbone telecommunications networks under a new strategy to act as a "genuine" national telecom company. The new strategy was expected to increase political and business tensions. Under the "build-transfer-operate" (BTO) concession agreements that TOT signed with private telecom operators, the TOT technically owns all fixed-line, mobile, and optical fibre networks in Thailand. However, it had never exercised those rights in the past.

Vuthiphong was fired from the TOT board and his position of acting TOT President in June 2007. He immediately accused the Army of using the TOT as an unmonitored slush fund. He claimed that an unnamed Army unit had requested that TOT buy 800 million baht worth of electronic equipment. Upon receiving the request, Vuthipong demanded to know why neither the Army nor the Defence Ministry used their own secret budgets to purchase the equipment, and why an internal Army unit, rather than the kingdom's main national security organisations, had made the request. Saprang denied that there was any lack of transparency in the request for financial support. Vuthipong claimed that the equipment should only have cost 30 million baht, not 800 million baht. He was fired and expelled from the board soon after refusing to sign off on the deal. The board later appointed Col. Natee Sukolrat as the new TOT President and accepted the army's donation request.

Under his leadership, TOT's performance dropped. Revenues for the first half of 2007 fell 13 percent year-on-year, while net profit fell 36.1 percent. Fixed line revenue dropped 16 percent, and public telephone and international call revenue by 30 percent each.

As Chairman of CAT Telecom, Saprang was accused by the founders of PTV, a new satellite television station, of being behind CAT Telecom's refusal to grant an internet link from Bangkok to a satellite up-link station in Hong Kong. PTV was established by several ex-executives of the Thai Rak Thai party. CAT Telecom claimed that it never received PTV's application for internet access.

Under Saprang's leadership, 80,000 subscribers of Thai Mobile, a TOT/CAT joint venture mobile phone operator, were cut off temporarily in early May 2007 when owners TOT and CAT Telecom failed to pay bills to a major supplier. Thai Mobile had accumulated significant losses and the company was not able to make its debt payments or supplier payments. The partners had stopped payments to the supplier, Samart Corporation, for nearly a year, until Samart threatened to suspend services within three days. After no payment, it delivered on its threat. TOT was subsequently able to negotiate with Samart to restart the service.

=== Airports of Thailand ===
==== Purging of AoT management ====
A week after Saprang hinted at a reshuffle of AoT top management, AoT President Chotisak Asapaviriya was forced to resign, citing health reasons, while the Directors of Suvarnabhumi Airport and AoT Commercial Operations were dismissed. Police Commissioner General Seripisut Temiyavej was appointed an AoT Director.

==== Suvarnabhumi Airport ====
As AoT Chairman, Saprang spearheaded an effort to reopen Don Mueang Airport in parallel with the newly opened Suvarnabhumi Airport, despite objections from the Civil Aviation Department, airlines, and internal studies within Airports of Thailand. Sixty airlines threatened to halt flights to Thailand if they were forced to move back to Don Mueang airport.

Saprang also refused to authorize urgent repairs on the airport tarmac, despite warnings from engineers. Karun Chandrarangsu, president of the Engineering Institute of Thailand noted, "Suvarnabhumi is like a patient in a coma who continues to suffer from severe bleeding. Stopping the blood flow now is more urgent and important than debating what caused the injury." The Engineering Institute of Thailand sent a formal warning to AoT in November 2006 about the urgent need to drain water from beneath the tarmac and noted that immediate action should be taken. "The AOT did nothing about the problem", Suebsak Promboon of the EIT noted. "The situation might not have become this bad if the water had been drained then." Suebsak Promboon, a senior foundation engineer and a member of the Tortrakul Yomnak-led airport tarmac inspection panel, accused the AOT of refusing to take any actions to solve the problems at the airport.

The airport faced ongoing operational challenges, including a computer virus that shut down the automated luggage bomb-scanning system in June 2007. A study by the International Air Transport Association (IATA) released in July 2007 found the airport unsafe, citing numerous spots where checked passengers can meet people who have not passed through security checkpoints.

Serious security gaps at Suvarnabhumi Airport became known to the public beginning in early 2007. The International Air Transport Association (IATA) found that there were many spots in the passenger terminal where checked passengers could meet people who have not passed through security checks and could receive unchecked objects and then carry them on board aircraft. The IATA also suggested that AoT deploy its own security staff instead of contracting out the job to the Loxley-ICTS consortium. AoT threatened the consortium with contract termination but didn't follow through with its threat, even though the consortium failed to live up to its contract. Six months later, AoT stated that it still couldn't make up its mind on how it should improve airport security. AoT said it was open to all possible options and had taken no action to upgrade the problem.

==== Trip to Europe ====
On Tuesday 27 February 2007, Saprang led a 13-member delegation to Europe, on what was claimed to be a week-long trip to study safety and security measures at major European airports. Many delegates and accompanying members shared the same surname, and the trip, which cost 7.2 million baht was attacked for "squandering" state funds for personal pleasure, disbursing unrealistic expenses, and inflating costs. The travel agent alone received a 500,000 baht commission fee for booking the trip. Saprang denied any wrongdoing and claimed he was the victim of a smear campaign. He also noted that "If you knew my character, you would know that even if a relative joined the trip he should have realised that he should work hard." He also noted that instead of being a viewed as a defendant, he should be viewed as a hero for bringing down the Thaksin government. Saprang then summoned the leader of the AoT labour union in order to identify who leaked information about the trip to his accusers.

==== Financial performance ====
In the first quarter after Saprang was appointed chairman, AoT profits plunged 90 percent compared to the previous year, despite higher traffic volumes and increased passenger service charters and airline fees. Operating expenses surged 137 percent, contributing to the AoT's worst quarterly earnings report since it was listed on the Stock Exchange of Thailand.

The AoT board also granted 200 million baht to the Army, which had requested a financial donation. AoT also lent some of its explosives detectors to the Army for use in the South Thailand insurrection.

Financial performance continued to spiral downwards in the 3rd quarter of 2007. Net profit for the period ending June fell by 84 percent from a year before, despite higher traffic and a 17.9 percent increase in revenue. The fall in profit was attributed to AoT's court case against King Power, the operator of duty-free shops within Suvarnabhumi Airport. King Power's concession was suspended while the case was in court, forcing AOT to stop reporting earnings from the concessionaire.

=== Thaksin Shinawatra ===
Saprang had long been a fierce critic of Thaksin Shinawatra, and prior to the coup had even called Thaksin's supporters within the military "evil." After the coup, Saprang called Thaksin a "traitor" and said that he should be "banished to live forever in the jungle."

Saprang also accused Thaksin of spying on the military while he was Prime Minister.

Although Saprang and General Sonthi accused Thaksin of insulting and disrespecting King Bhumibol, he noted that the junta did not pursue lèse majesté charges against Thaksin because "the police corrupted the evidence", and delivered such a weak case that the attorney-general could not file a lawsuit. A vocal self-proclaimed royalist, he insisted that various groups actively tried to challenge the monarchy, and that he "couldn't stand it." He noted, "I am a soldier, born to protect the Crown. They could only challenge the monarchy over my dead body."

Saprang also suspected that Oliver Jufer, a Swiss man who was jailed for lèse majesté for spraying paint on a portrait of the image of King Bhumibol, was hired by somebody to perform his vandalism. Saprang ordered a military investigation into the matter. The results have not been made public.

=== 2007 New Years bombings ===
Saprang had a public confrontation with former Prime Minister Chavalit Yongchaiyudh regarding the 2006 Bangkok New Year's Eve bombings after Chavalit accused him of incompetence. Saprang claimed that "the evidence and intelligence information proves that the bombs were the dirty work of politicians who lost power and benefits. Bad soldiers loyal to bad politicians collaborated with them with the intention to topple this government." However, his claim was contradicted just an hour later by Prime Minister Surayud Chulanont.

In May 2007, Saprang claimed that he had information regarding the seizure of an instructional manual on terrorism in Bangkok from a London apartment by English soldiers and police. He said he could not disclose any further information, but told the public to connect the dots themselves. Days later, a bomb exploded outside of Chitrlada Palace. Saprang later clarified his remark, saying the Bangkok terrorism manual discovery had been made in the early 1990s. Deputy Chief of the British Mission in Bangkok Andy Pierce said he was "concerned" by Saprang's remarks, which he insisted were "baseless".

=== Resignation of Pridiyathorn Devakula ===
Saprang was implicated in the resignation of Finance Minister Pridiyathorn Devakula on 28 February 2007. The Bangkok Post reported that Pridiyathorn resigned in protest after a CNS member lobbied him to sell shares of IRPC (formerly known as Thai Petrochemical Industry) back to a former shareholder. The newspaper identified Saprang as the unnamed CNS member. Saprang's brother, Chienchuang, was a key financial advisor to Prachai Liaophairat, the estranged founder of TPI.

Chienchuang's relations with the junta came under further public scrutiny when it was revealed that he was hired by the junta in order to lead a campaign to discredit deposed premier Thaksin Shinawatra. Politicians hired as part of the CNS campaign included Chat Pattana party leader Korn Dabbaransi, Democrats Korn Chatikavanij, Alongkorn Palabutr and Korbsak Sabavasu, Prapat Panyachatraksa, a key Thai Rak Thai member who defected to the Chat Thai party, plus ex-senator Kraisak Choonhavan. Academics hired by the CNS included Wuttipong Piebjriya-wat, Sophon Supapong, Narong Phet-prasert, and Somkiat Osotspa.

=== Mad dogs and machine guns ===
Saprang was an extremely vocal critic of those whom he perceived as his political opponents. In an interview with Thai Rath (Thailand's most popular newspaper) on 8 April 2007, he called an unspecified enemy a "mad dog" who he claimed was destroying the monarchy. He said that it was necessary to shoot the dog with a machine gun. In the same interview, he threatened a violent response to the "bold words that came from the mouths of evil people who did not know restraint". He urged decisive action so that the public would believe that good had triumphed over evil.

=== Post-coup role ===
Saprang was considered a strong contender to lead the junta given the mandatory retirement of Army commander-in-chief and CNS President Sonthi Boonyaratkalin in September 2007. He unofficially competed with fellow Assistant Army Commander Anupong Paochinda, who, as 1st Army Area Commander, secured Bangkok on the night of the coup. The Bangkok Post reported in October 2006 that Sonthi was grooming Anupong to be his successor by giving him responsibilities over coup logistics, a greater task than had been assigned to Saprang. The Asia Times quoted a former MP as saying "Anupong is seen as the real force behind the coup. Saprang is more vocal, but he has no real base. The only way he could be seen as a promising leader is by pushing the country to the brink."

In an interview, Saprang warned that "the three pillars of society - the nation, the religion and the monarchy - might crumble...If rogue politicians return to power following the next [post coup] general election."

Saprang also held the opinion that military coups against the government "should never be ruled out." The abrogated 1997 constitution had outlawed coups. A replacement constitution was, at the time of Saprang's statement, being drafted by a military-appointed panel.

Saprang was sidelined in security plans preceding the Constitutional Tribunal's 20 May 2007 ruling on the dissolution of the Thai Rak Thai and Democrat Parties. After the 2006 coup, Sonthi delegated the task of securing Bangkok to Saprang. The pre-ruling plan put Sonthi directly in charge of Bangkok crowd security, allying him with alums of AFPS Class 9, including Army Chief of Staff General Montri Sangkhasap and First Army Region commander Lt General Prayuth Chan-ocha.

Panitan Wattanayagorn, a military scholar at Chulalongkorn University and a personal adviser to Prime Minister Surayud Chulanont noted in early September 2007 that "if the army is going to take a full step into politics, then it will be Saprang. If only a half-step, then Anupong. And if it intends to beat a full retreat or take one step back, it will be [Army chief of staff] Montri [Sangkhasap ]."

On 19 September 2007, Saprang's rival, Assistant Army Commander-in-Chief Gen Anupong Paochinda, was appointed as the new commander-in-chief of the Army, replacing the retiring General Sonthi. Anupong's mandatory retirement occurred in 2010. Sonthi was, after resignation, appointed Deputy Prime Minister. Saprang was transferred to become Deputy Permanent Secretary of the Ministry of Defense. Saprang's ally, Defence Ministry Deputy Permanent Secretary Admiral Bannawit Kengrien, called Saprang's transfer a "demotion" and a "punishment." However, Saprang himself claimed that he did not feel slighted for being passed over, noting that "everything is over" for him. Bannawit himself was later transferred from Defence Ministry Deputy Permanent Secretary to be a Chief Adviser of the Ministry, replaced by Chief Advisor General Toosarat Muang-am. Bannawit denied that his own transfer was the result of his criticism of Saprang's transfer. Bannawit then announced that he would resign from the military and enter politics. There was also rampant speculation that Saprang himself would resign and enter politics. Although the Kyodo News Agency noted speculation that Saprang would stage a coup against Anupong, Saprang denied coup rumours, saying that another coup would be "suicide."

== Personal life ==
Saprang was the youngest of nine children of Lieutenant Colonel Sri (Thai: ศรี กัลยาณมิตร) and Phenkaew Kalayanamitr (Thai: เพ็ญแก้ว กัลยาณมิตร). Sri was the eldest of the 8 children of Phraya Sucharitraksa, ruler (Chao Muang) of the northern border city of Tak.

The Kalayanamitrs are a military aristocratic family with Chinese (Hokkien)-Northern Thai roots. Saprang's ancestor, Luang Phichai Waree (original name Ung Mang, Thai: หลวงพิไชยวารี, มั่ง แซ่อึ้ง) migrated to Siam during the reign of King Taksin plying the samphao trade, and was given a feudal title during the reign of King Rama I.

Saprang had evoked his aristocratic background in order to increase his credibility in public confrontations. Saprang was married to Viphada (Thai: วิภาดา) and had 3 sons: Army Cadet Ekawee (Thai: เอกวีร์), Air Force Cadet Akharawat (Thai: อัครวัต), Air Force Cadet Ekwarit (Thai: เอกวริษฐ์).

Saprang Kalayanamitr died from lung cancer on 21 November 2023, at the age of 75.

== See also ==
- 2006 Thailand coup – Coup against Prime Minister Thaksin Shinawatra
- Council for National Security – Military government of Thailand following the 2006 coup
- Sonthi Boonyaratkalin – Thai general (born 1946)
- Surayud Chulanont – Prime Minister of Thailand from 2006 to 2008
- Wat Kalayanamitr – One of the Kalayanamitr family's three temples
