= People's Television =

People's Television may refer to:

- People's Television Network, a state-owned television station in the Philippines
- PTV (Thailand), a former satellite television station in Thailand
