= Surayud Chulanont =

Prime Minister of Thailand from 2006 to 2008

Surayud Chulanont PCh MPCh MVM RM
- สุรยุทธ์ จุลานนท์
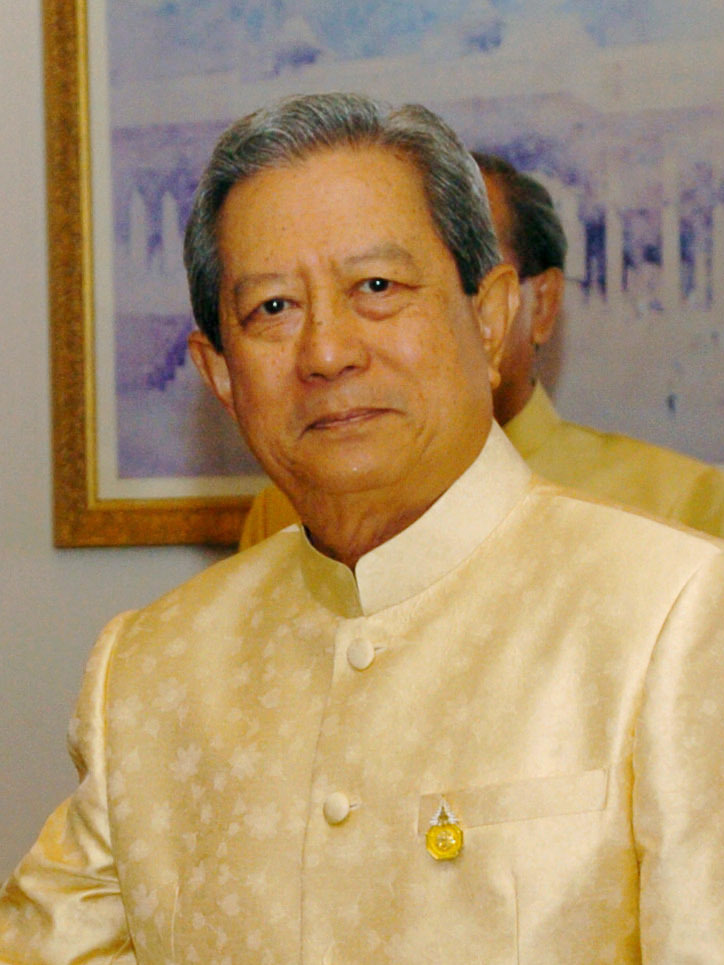
- Surayud in 2007

President of the Privy Council
- Incumbent
- Assumed office 2 January 2020; Acting: 27 May 2019 — 2 January 2020
- Monarch: Vajiralongkorn
- Preceded by: Prem Tinsulanonda

Privy Councillor of Thailand
- In office 29 December 2016 – 2 January 2020
- Monarch: Vajiralongkorn

24th Prime Minister of Thailand
- In office 1 October 2006 – 29 January 2008
- Monarch: Bhumibol Adulyadej
- Deputy: Pridiyathorn Devakula; Kosit Panpiemras; Phaiboon Watthanasiritham; Sonthi Boonyaratglin
- Preceded by: Thaksin Shinawatra; Sonthi Boonyaratglin (as Head of the Council for Democratic Reform)
- Succeeded by: Samak Sundaravej

Minister of Interior
- In office 3 October 2007 – 6 February 2008
- Prime Minister: Himself
- Preceded by: Aree Wong-araya
- Succeeded by: Chalerm Yubamrung

Supreme Commander of the Royal Thai Armed Forces
- In office 1 October 2002 – 30 September 2003
- Preceded by: Narong Yuthavong
- Succeeded by: Somtat Attanand

Commander-in-Chief of the Royal Thai Army
- In office 1 October 1998 – 30 September 2002
- Preceded by: Chettha Thannajaro
- Succeeded by: Somtat Attanand

Personal details
- Born: 28 August 1943 (age 83) Chakrapong Camp, Mueang Prachinburi, Prachinburi, Thailand
- Height: 1.65 m (5 ft 5 in)
- Spouse(s): Duangphon Rattanakri (div.); Chitravadee Chulanont
- Children: 3
- Parent: Phayom Chulanont (father)
- Education: Chulachomklao Royal Military Academy; National Defence College of Thailand
- Profession: Soldier
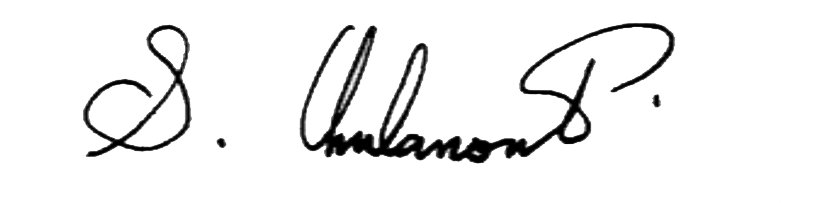
- Signature

Military service
- Allegiance: Thailand
- Branch/service: Royal Thai Army
- Years of service: 1965–2003
- Rank: General; Admiral; Air Chief Marshal
- Commands: Supreme Commander; Commander-in-Chief: Army; Commanding General of the Army Special Warfare
- Battles/wars: Cold War; Communist insurgency in Thailand; Black May; 1999 East Timorese crisis; International Force East Timor; Operation Pochentong 1; War on Drugs
- Awards: Rama Medal; Freemen Safeguarding Medal (First Class); Border Service Medal; Chakra Mala Medal; Darjah Kepahlawanan Angkatan Tentera; Darjah Utama Bakti Cemerlang (Tentera); Pingat Jasa Gemilang (Tentera); Legion of Merit Commander; Bintang Kartika Eka Paksi Utama; Tongil Medal

Surayud Chulanont (Thai: สุรยุทธ์ จุลานนท์, RTGS: Surayut Chulanon, IPA: [sù.rá.jút t͡ɕù.laː.non]; born 28 August 1943) is a Thai former politician and military officer who was the 24th prime minister of Thailand and head of Thailand's interim government between 2006 and 2008. He is a former supreme commander of the Royal Thai Army and is currently Privy Councilor to King Vajiralongkorn.

Surayud came from a military family, but his father defected from the Royal Thai Army to the Communist Party of Thailand when Surayud was a boy. Surayud joined the Thai Army and rose to power as an aide to General Prem Tinsulanonda. He commanded troops during Bloody May, the violent 1992 crackdown on anti-government protesters, but he denied giving his men the order to shoot protesters. He was promoted to army commander during the government of Chuan Leekpai and was promoted to supreme commander in 2003, under the government of Thaksin Shinawatra. Upon his retirement from the army, he was appointed by King Bhumibol Adulyadej to the Privy Council of Thailand. Surayud and Privy Council President Prem Tinsulanonda played a key role in the promotion of General Sonthi Boonratklin to the position of army commander.

Sonthi overthrew the government of Thaksin in a coup on 19 September 2006 and implored Surayud to be the head of interim government. Surayud's government was controversial. There was a significant worsening in perceived levels of corruption during his government. Surayud's Deputy Finance Minister, Sommai Pasee, was sentenced to jail for abuse of power. Surayud raised the military budget by 35% and was accused of economic mismanagement, rampant human rights abuses, and flip-flopping on numerous policies. Article 19 ranked Thailand as falling behind Cambodia and Indonesia in terms of freedom of expression. Thailand's economic growth rate slowed to the lowest level in five years and was ranked the lowest in the region. However, Surayud was praised for apologising for atrocities committed by the Thai military fighting the South Thailand insurgency, although the apology was accompanied by a sharp escalation in violence. He has been accused of forest reserve encroachment (a charge that was not investigated since the statute of limitations had run out by two years) and of illegally acquiring train carriages for display in his forest home.

== Family and education ==
Surayud came from a long line of military leaders. His maternal grandfather was Phraya Sri Sitthi Songkhram (Din Tharab), a royalist leader during the failed Boworadej Rebellion. Surayud's father was Lt. Colonel Phayom Chulanont, a Royal Thai Army military officer who, as "Comrade Too Khamtan" (Thai: สหายตู้คำตัน, RTGS: sahai tu khamtan), became a member of the Central Committee Communist Party of Thailand and Chief of Staff of the People's Liberation Army of Thailand.

Surayud completed his early education at Saint Gabriel's College and Suankularb Wittayalai School in Bangkok. He graduated from the inaugural class of Armed Forces Preparatory Academy.

As a boy, Surayud's father left his family to go underground to join the Communists. Phayom explained his defection by citing corruption in the army and its inability to defend the powerless. His father's defection to the Communists had a large impact on Surayud. Surayud's son, Non, noted that, "My father always told me that we must help each other redeem the tarnished family name of Chulanont so that Thais can look up to it."

Surayud entered Chulachomklao Royal Military Academy (CRMA) and graduated from Class 12.

Surayud was conferred honorary doctor of philosophy degrees in: 1. Communication Arts in 1995 by Wongchavalidkul University, Thailand. 2. Liberal Arts (Rural Planning and Development) in 2000 by Maejo University, Thailand. 3. Liberal Arts (Political Science) in 2004 by Prince of Songkla University, Thailand. 4. Engineering in April 2007 by Tokai University, Japan. 5. Social Development in December 2008 by Huachiew University, Thailand.

Surayud currently serves as a chancellor of the council of King Mongkut's Institute of Technology Ladkrabang (KMITL) and Phetchaburi Rajabhat University.

== Military career ==
Early in his army career, Surayud served in several army divisions including a light artillery unit and a paratrooper unit. He conducted operations against the Communist Party of Thailand (CPT) while his father was a leader of the CPT. From 1972 to 1978, he was an instructor at the Special Warfare School. He was an aide to General Prem Tinsulanonda when Prem was appointed army commander and later Prime Minister of Thailand. Surayud was appointed Commander of the Special Warfare Command in 1992, where he was the commanding officer of Sonthi Boonratklin.

During Bloody May, the violent crackdown 1992 on anti-government protesters, Surayud's men were seen at areas near the Royal Hotel, where protesters were seen being searched for weapons and later dragged into the hotel. He later claimed that he never gave orders for his soldiers to shoot. According to a later interview, "It convinced me that the army should never be involved in politics." Days later he told a national television audience that he deplored the loss of life and that he had not given any orders to shoot. In 1994, he was appointed commander of the 2nd Army Region.

Surayud was promoted to army commander in late-1998. At the time, his promotion was controversial, as Surayud had been politically "shelved" at a staff position. To secure his vision of a politics-free army, Surayud appointed several of his classmates from Class 12 of the CRMA to key positions. Among these were Lt Gen Sompong Maivichit, who he made head of army-controlled Channel 5 television station, replacing Gen Pang Malakul na Ayudhya, and Lt Gen Boonrod Somtap, who he promoted to a key subordinate position to replace Gen Charn Boonprasert. He also ended a policy of deporting Burmese refugees, especially ethnic Karens, back to Burma. "He's been a friend to us," said Pastor Robert Htway of the Karen Refugee Committee. During his term, Thai soldiers took part in the United Nations Peace Keeping Force, assisting UN-PKF efforts in East Timor.

To stop drug and drug cartels into Thailand, Surayud, in March 2002, ordered one of Thailand's largest military operations in recent times, when Thai troops moved deep into Myanmar territory to destroy drug labs and military bases controlled by the United Wa State Army.

In 2003, after over four years as Army Commander, Surayud was promoted to the position of supreme commander, a loftier, but less influential, post, during the government of Thaksin Shinawatra. He was replaced as army commander by Somthad Attanan. His promotion was rumoured to be the result of a conflict with the prime minister, possibly over foreign policy towards Myanmar and the crackdown on drugs.

== Privy councilor ==
On 14 November 2003, King Bhumibol Adulyadej appointed Surayud to his Privy Council of personal advisors. Several months later he asked the king for permission to ordain as a monk for a brief period at a forest temple in northeastern Thailand. Surayud and Privy Council President Prem Tinsulanonda had been perceived to have a key role in the promotion of General Sonthi Boonratklin to the position of army commander.

Facing an escalating insurgency in the south of Thailand, Surayud urged the media to paint a more positive picture of the violence. "Truthful words that may not be beneficial nor do any good to the public should be avoided", noted Surayud to the Press Council of Thailand. He was contradicted by Deputy Prime Minister Chaturon Chaisang, who noted that he couldn't think of any news about the conflict in the South that could or should not be reported by the media.

In response to numerous claims made by anti-Thaksin activist Sondhi Limthongkul that his People's Alliance for Democracy was "fighting for the King", Surayud responded by saying that, "Recent references to the monarchy were inappropriate. The institution should not be involved in politics. Political disputes should be solved in a political way."

In January 2008, not long after Surayud ended his term as prime minister, he was again reappointed to King Bhumibol Adulyadej's Privy Council.

In 2020 Surayud stood in for Vajiralongkorn in the Royal Ploughing Ceremony of rice, directing the planting of Dok Mali 105, Pathum Than 1, Kor Khor 43, Kor Khor 6, and Kor Khor 79.

== Environmental protection ==
Surayud was chairman of the Khao Yai National Park Protection Foundation.

However, after becoming premier in 2006, he was accused of breaching the Forestry Act and the National Forest Reserves Act by illegally owning forest land in Yaithiang Mountain of Nakhon Ratchasima Province. He vowed to resign and return the land (which he did not deny owning) if found guilty.

In February 2010 after demonstrations by "Red Shirts" at Khao Yaithiang Mountain, Surayud, who by then had already left politics, returned the land to the Royal Forestry Department when it was found that the land was within forest reserve land under the ministry's decades old code. The plot of land is now under Royal Forestry Department's care. However, up until now no legal action has been taken by Thai authorities against him or other landowners of similar case around the country. Some opposition pressed him to resign from his post as privy councillor only as to understand later that Surayud "had no ill intention" and that it was highly inappropriate to ask for resignation of the post on such unreasonable ground.

== Prime Minister of Thailand (2006–2008) ==
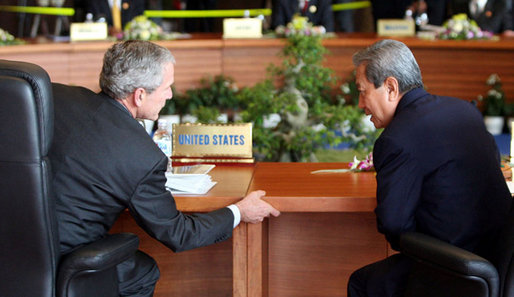
Surayud (right) with U.S. President George W. Bush at the National Conference Center in Hanoi

Surayud was already considered a strong candidate for appointment as civilian prime minister premiership immediately after General Sonthi overthrew the government of Thaksin Shinawatra. Indeed, Surayud's appointment to the Premiership was confirmed by junta leader Sonthi Boonyaratglin on the morning of Sunday 1 October 2006. After a couple imploring asks for Surayud to take the temporary premiership, Sonthi had a formal audience with King Bhumibol Adulyadej at 4 pm that day to nominate Surayud's name to the monarch. "Security and social unity" were cited by Sonthi as the key reasons for appointing Surayud.

Surayud announced that as premier, he would "Focus on self-sufficiency, more than focusing on the GDP numbers. I will focus on the happiness of the people, more than the GDP." He also claimed that he would be "Friendly to every party, trying to receive information from every side and meeting people as much as possible. I will lead a government based on justice."

Due to influences from junta and those behind the scene, the policies and positions of several ministers in Surayud's cabinet changed very frequently, sometimes on a daily basis. Notable flip-flops included Thailand's refusal to share avian flu samples with the WHO, capital controls against foreign investment, shareholding limits for foreign investors in telecommunications firms, the identity of bombers in the 2006 New Year's Eve bombings, and the role of the Malaysian government in mediating the South Thailand insurgency.

While he was prime minister, Surayud's wife, Colonel Khunying Chitrawadee, was awarded the Dame Grand Commander (Second Class) of the Most Illustrious Order of Chulachomklao, allowing her to use the prefix Than Phu Ying.

=== Popularity ===
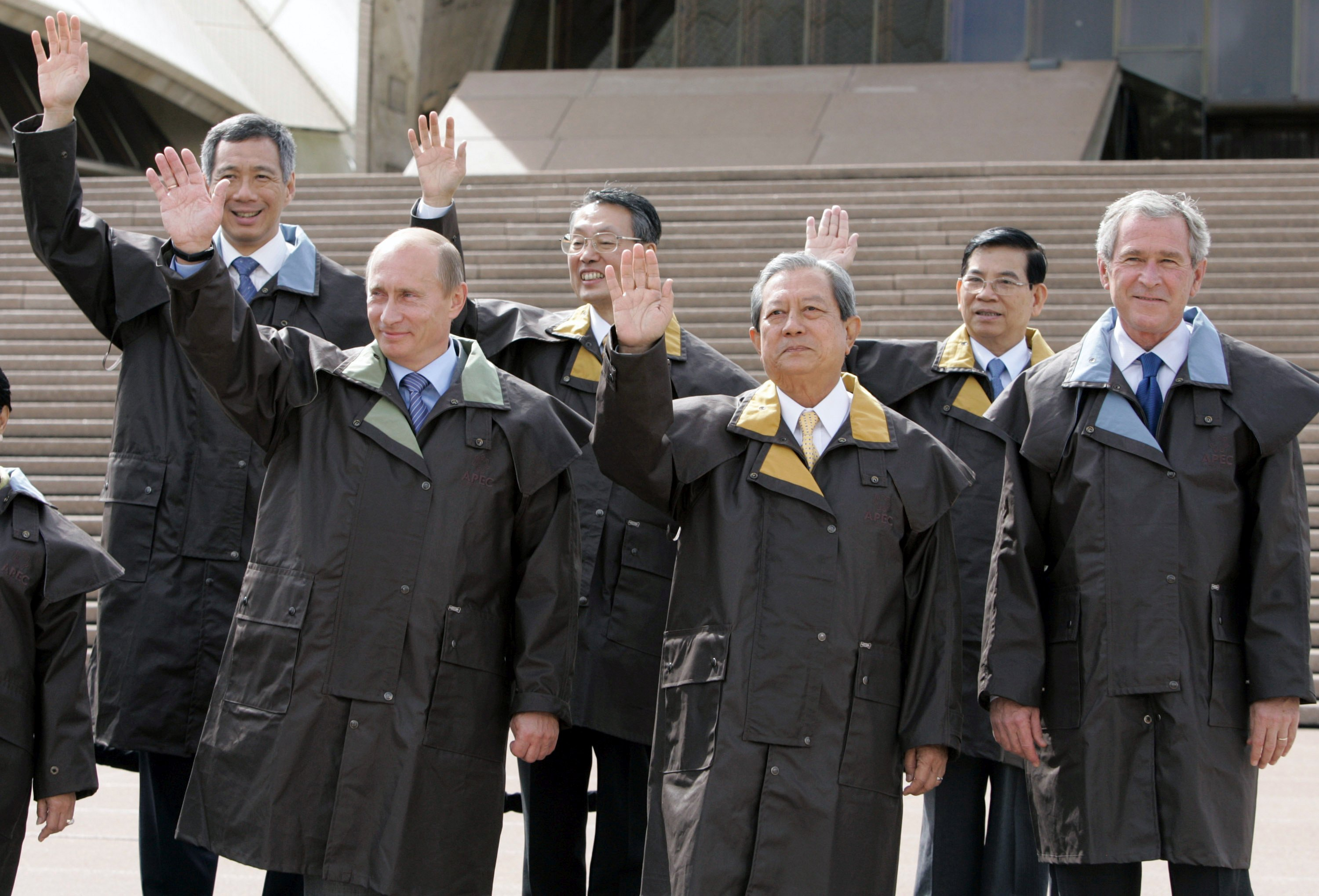
Surayud (4th from left) at APEC Summit in Australia

The Surayud government's initial nationwide approval rating in October 2006 stood at 60%, with 8% disapproving. By early-November, this fell to 55% approving and 15% disapproving. For comparison, a nationwide poll in July 2006 found that 49% of respondents would have voted for Thaksin Shinawatra in the cancelled October elections.

The 2006 Bangkok New Year's Eve bombings caused Surayud's popularity to drop to 48.5% according to Assumption University's polling arm—and just 11% said they had "full confidence" the government can handle the crisis.

The 2007 Chinese New Year Bombings, which saw 38 bombing attacks, 26 cases of arson, and seven ambushes within a single day, caused Surayud's popularity to drop even further: 53.7% of respondents living in Bangkok and other major cities in felt the government and the CNS could not put an end to problems in the country. Only 24.6% thought that the situation would improve in six months.

By 24 February 2007, his popularity among Bangkokians had further dropped to 34.8%, although he was still more popular than Thaksin Shinawatra, whom 28.8% of Bangkokians favoured.

By 4 March 2007, only 31.3% of people in Bangkok supported the government's political stance. This fell dramatically to 12.5% by 26 March 2007. Notably the main reason behind the drop was that people wanted to see quick changes in state policies and that actions and judgments for the ousted former prime minister were not forthcoming soon enough.

The US government decided to continue holding "Cobra Gold" joint military exercises with the Thai government. Immediately after the coup, Washington had halted all military co-operation with, and aid to, the junta. US law forbade assistance to governments of a country where an elected leader has been deposed in a coup.

In early-May 2007, activists from the Assembly of Isaan People met with junta chief Sonthi Boonyaratglin in order to appeal for him to remove Surayud Chulanont. Sonthi personally met the anti-Surayud activists at army headquarters and promised he would consider their request. This was the first time that Sonthi met people calling for the removal of Surayud. Sonthi later claimed that he was "tricked" into meeting the activists.

Surayud launched a weekly talk show called "Poed Baan Phitsanulok" ("Opening Up Baan Pitsanulok"; Baan Pitsanulok is the informal name for Government House) so as to share views and progress of interim government's aim (towards peaceful, internationally recognised general election). The show aired on state-run Channel 11 every Saturday between 08:30 and 09:15. Calling the weekly radio show that was hosted by Thaksin Shinawatra when he was premier "propaganda", he denied any similarity between the two shows.

The military junta's popularity continued to decline. By late-June 2007, an ABAC Poll found that only 13.6% supported the government, with 69.8 of respondents disappointed with the political situation.

The government's popularity continued to decline into July, when survey respondents in Bangkok and outlying areas gave the government an average score of 4.32 out of 10. The average score had been 4.53 in March 2007 and 5.27 in January 2007. Fewer than 15% of respondents in the survey felt that the nation's overall situation had improved during the government's nine-month tenure, while 31.6% said the situation remained unchanged and the majority, 34.9% said it had worsened.

=== Drafting of a permanent constitution and elections ===
The junta's 2006 Interim Constitution authorised the junta to appoint a 2,000 person National Assembly which would select members to become candidates for a Constitution Drafting Assembly. From the onset of his appointment as premier, Surayud Chulanont was urged by academics to override the junta's control of the constitution drafting process. Somchai Siripreechakul, Dean of Law at Chiang Mai University, urged Surayud to call a general election as soon as possible and hand the task of drafting a charter to an elected parliament. Banjerd Singkhaneti of Thammasat University noted of the constitution drafting process, "I think it will be a mess and the next constitution will be just that."

After the coup, the military junta had originally promised to draft a permanent charter within eight months and to hold elections in October 2007. However, Prime Minister's Office Minister Thirapat Serirangsan later announced that elections might not occur until one year and five months.

After a constitutional referendum on 19 August, Surayud promised that elections would “definitely” be held in late December.

=== Cabinet appointments ===
Some believed that Prem Tinsulanonda, President of the King's Privy Council, played a significant role in picking the members of Surayud's cabinet. It was, however, Surayud who made the final decision. General Boonrawd Somtas, a former CDRMA classmate and longtime friend of Surayud, was appointed defense minister. former Interior Permanent Secretary Aree Wong-araya was appointed interior minister, former Energy Policy and Planning Office director Piyasvasti Amranand became energy minister, central bank governor Pridiyathorn Devakula became finance minister, and Bangkok Bank Chairman Kosit Panpiemras became industry minister. Michael Nelson of Chulalongkorn University noted that the cabinet was dominated by bureaucrats and that "It's very strongly guided by military ideas combined with some technocrats, some people in economic areas and some former bureaucrats."

Deputy Prime Minister and Finance Minister Pridiyathorn resigned on 28 February 2007. His resignation shocked the political world as well as the business community. His cited reasons for resignation included,

- Surayud's decision to appoint Pridiyathorn's rival, former Thaksin-government Finance Minister Somkid Jatusripitak, as a self-sufficiency economy special envoy. Somkid resigned from his position after less than a week.
- Prime Minister's Office Minister Thirapat Serirangsan's alleged preference to certain private media interests. Several analysts speculated that he was referring to the preferential treatment the junta gave to leading anti-Thaksin critic Sondhi Limthongkul, who was also a long-time critic of Pridiyathorn.

Pridiyathorn was replaced by Chalongphob Sussangkarn, an academic who led the Thailand Development Research Institute. Chalongphob had previously criticised the junta's capital controls policy.

=== Policies ===
==== Telecommunications ====
- The planned merger of state-telecom companies TOT and CAT.
- The cancellation of plans to list TOT, CAT, and Thai Post on the Stock Exchange of Thailand.
- The cancellation of the Thaksin government's telecom excise tax policy. The Thaksin government imposed an excise tax on privately offered fixed and cellular services, and then allowed telecom companies to deduct the amount they paid in excise tax from concession fees they had to pay to state concession owners TOT or CAT Telecom. The total amount paid by the private telecom firms did not change. The Surayud government's excise tax cancellation meant that TOT and CAT would receive their full concession payments. However, TOT and CAT were then forced to increase their dividends to the Ministry of Finance to account for their increased income.
- Changing the publicly listed state-enterprise media company MCOT's policy from focusing on monetary benefits to social benefits. MCOT's stock prices dropped 5.13% to an 11-month low as a result.
- Surayud reversed policies many times regarding the fate of the iTV TV station. Surayud first announced that it intended to take over the station and promised that the station would not be taken off the air no matter what happened regarding its concession controversy. However, in early-March 2007, PM's Office Minister Dhipawadee Meksawan announced that the station would be taken off the air on midnight on 6 March 2007, following the cabinet's revocation of iTV's concession. Surayud apologised for not keeping his word. Then on 7 March 2007, Surayud reversed his decision yet again and ordered that iTV continue broadcasting after the deadline had passed.

==== Culture ====
- The planned ban against all forms of advertising for alcoholic beverages.
- The banning of all "sexually arousing dances" (locally called "coyote dances") during the Loy Kratong festival.
- From March 2007 onwards, encouraging that all Thai citizens dress in yellow every day until 31 December 2007, in order to display loyalty to King Bhumibol and celebrate his 80th birthday.
- Urging Chulalongkorn University to take action against its fourth-year psychology student Pemmika Veerachatraksit, for having broken university discipline by having an affair with another person's husband. ' The Culture Ministry claimed that as a student, being accused of having an adulterous affair should be taken as guilt. The student was sued for 27 million baht by Alisa Thomthitchong for allegedly having an affair with her husband, Dr Prakitpao Thomthitchong.

==== Public health ====
- Making the 30-baht universal healthcare program completely free. The Budget Bureau criticised the move. The government later cut the universal healthcare program budget by over 3.8 billion baht, providing a subsidy of just 1,899 baht per head, compared to the previously proposed figure of 2,089 baht. The number of eligible people was cut from 48 million to 46 million people. Funding for the program was diverted from the government's road-accident victims' protection fund.
- Licensed the production and sale of patented HIV and heart disease drugs without the permission of the foreign patent owners. Lack of public health budget was cited as the reasons for breaking the patents. "It has stunned our industry," said the president of the Pharmaceutical Research and Manufacturers Association (PReMA). The Minister of Public Health claimed that pharmaceutical industry was reaping "colossal" profits. Under World Trade Organization rules, a government is allowed to break patents under after declaring a "national emergency." Breaking the patents of Abbott's HIV treatment Kaletra and Sanofi-Aventis' blood clot drug Plavix was estimated to save Thailand US$24 million a year. Abbott Laboratories said it would stop launching new medicines in Thailand in protest at the junta's move to override international drug patents. "Thailand has chosen to break patents on numerous medicines, ignoring the patent system. As such, we've elected not to introduce new medicines there," an Abbott spokesperson told reporters. The seven withdrawn drugs include the new version of Kaletra, an antibiotic, a painkiller and medicines to fight blood clots, arthritis, kidney disease and high blood pressure.
- The junta joined Indonesia in a boycott on sharing its H5N1 avian influenza virus samples with vaccine developers and the international health community. Surayud's Public Health Minister told reporters that "Drugmakers rarely help us. They only gave us a small amount of vaccine, just like a donation." Thailand had 25 H5N1 cases and 17 deaths since 2003, ranking it the fourth hardest hit country by the avian flu. Indonesia stopped sharing its H5N1 samples with the WHO at the end of 2006 since the strains were being used to develop vaccines that the country couldn't afford.
- Thailand's representative to the World Health Organization (also special advisor to the public health minister), Dr Suwit Wibulpolprasert said that during an executive board meeting of the WHO in January, Dr Suwit, declared that if an influenza pandemic were to hit Thailand, he would advise the government to hold Western tourists hostage until those countries gave Thailand the necessary vaccines. The US government has lodged a formal protest letter and requested an apology. US Health and Human Services Secretary Michael Leavitt wrote that Dr Suwit's comments "appear to contravene the spirit and provisions of the revised International Health Regulations."
- Human Rights Watch and the Thai AIDS Treatment Action Group claimed that the Surayud junta failed to provide safe treatment for drug users infected with HIV, and did not effectively promote harm reduction techniques to stop the spread of the virus.

==== Energy ====
- The indefinite delay of the previous government's policy of converting all octane 95 gasoline sales to gasohol.
- The cancellation of state electricity company EGAT's guaranteed 50% share in all new power plant construction.
- The prevention of EGAT from participating in bidding for new electricity plants under the Independent Power Producer (IPP) program.
- The cancellation of plans to import hydroelectric power and natural gas from Myanmar.
- The development of a US$6 billion nuclear power plant. The 4,000 megawatt plant would be Thailand's first. The government announced that it would start a large public relations program, starting with kindergarten children, of "educating" the public about how nuclear power was unavoidable.

==== Security and the southern insurrection ====
- An increase in military spending by 35% in 2007, compared to 2006. The budget for 2008 totalled 140 billion baht, 24% higher than 2007 and representing 8.6% of the total 2008 budget. Since 1999, military spending had remained stagnant at approximately $2 billion in 2000 dollars. In addition, Surayud received an extra request for an additional 17.6 billion baht to fund counter-insurgency efforts in the far South over the next four years on top of an additional 456-million-baht secret military budget.
- Issuing a formal apology regarding the Tak Bai incident. The day after he issued his apology, 46 violent incidents were recorded, compared with a daily average of 9 in the previous month. Violence continued to escalate throughout 2006 and 2007.
- Revealing for the first time to the public that the insurgency was being finance by a network of restaurants and stalls selling Tom Yam Kung in Malaysia. Surayud claimed that the Tom Yam Kung network collected money from local businessmen through blackmail and demands for protection fees and channelled the sum to the separatists. Malaysian Deputy Security Minister Fu Ah Kiow described the revelation as "absolutely baseless," and "very imaginative."
- Surayud's Cabinet gave the staff of the Internal Security Operations Command an 84.3 million baht "reward". The ISOC had originally requested the reward in 2003, but was turned down by the Thaksin government.
- Appointing Seripisut Temiyavet as Police Commissioner General, replacing Kowit Watana. Kowit was transferred to a civilian post soon after arresting several military personnel for alleged involvement in the 2006 Bangkok New Year's Eve bombings. Kowit protested his transfer, and the Central Administrative Court later an injunction to protect him from the transfer until it reached a final ruling on the matter.
- Allowing the Malaysian government to help mediate in the South Thailand insurgency, contradicting a statement by Foreign Minister Nitya Pibulsonggram made just 2 days before.

==== Education ====
- The cancellation of Thailand's participation in the One Laptop Per Child (OLPC) program. The project has been criticised as unrealistic for an impoverished country like Thailand.
- The cancellation of plans to install personal computers and broadband internet connections in every public and secondary school in Thailand.
- Forcing 430 prestigious schools across the country to accept half of their students from the local neighbourhood. All other schools would be required to accept all applicants; if applicants exceeded seats, a random draw would choose which applicants would be accepted.
- The continuation of the Thaksin Shinawatra government's "One District, One Scholarship" program under the name "Scholarships for Community Development". The maximum annual income for eligible recipients' families was raised from 100,000 baht to 150,000 baht.
- The proposed cancellation of the guarantee of 12 years of free education in the next constitution of Thailand.

==== Economy and agriculture ====
- A budget deficit of 147 billion Baht for fiscal year 2007. This was the first budget deficit since 2003. Fiscal deficits were also expected for 2008. The Deficit expanded to 168 billion baht in 2008. The junta-appointed National Legislative Assembly passed the budget unanimously. The deficit would be funded by domestic borrowing.
- Capital controls in an attempt to reverse a massive appreciation of the Thai Baht. The moves caused a crash in the Thai stock market, with a one-day loss of 820 billion baht (approx. US$22 billion) in market value. The move resulted in harsh criticism both within Thailand and abroad. "My definition of what's going on is 'Welcome to amateur hour,'" said Donald Gimbel, fund manager for Carret & Co. Korn Chatikavanij of the Democrat party noted a policy reversal, "That can't repair the damage that was caused in one historic day." The Export-Import Bank of Thailand also criticised the capital controls.
- Elimination of subsidies for rice farmers. The price of rice, set at 30% above market prices during the deposed Thaksin Shinawatra government, was dramatically lowered. It was claimed that the high price of rice seriously affected farmers and caused social burdens.
- The cancellation of the Million Cows project. Under the project, the government lent five million cows to one million farming families. The families were allowed to sell milk and calves for profit. The program was highly popular among politicians.
- The rebranding of Thaksin Shinawatra's "SML" village development scheme as the "sufficiency village development scheme." Villagers wishing to draw down funds under the scheme were now required to draft projects based on the King's self-sufficient economy principles. The self-sufficiency scheme was given a budget of 10 billion baht.
- The cancellation of the Assets Capitalisation Bureau, the administrator of the Thaksin-government's asset capitalisation program. The program allowed people owning assets not accepted by banks as collateral (e.g., machinery, intellectual property rights, or land rental rights) to capitalise those assets and get loans. According to the government, the abolition of the Assets Capitalisation Bureau was based on its policy not to encourage people to go into debt. Critics claimed the program was cancelled due to its association with the deposed premier.
- To punish Thaksin Shinawatra for his sale of Shin Corp to a Singaporean company, Surayud altered regulations concerning foreign ownership of companies. This impacted the legality of thousands of local subsidiaries of foreign companies operating in Thailand. However, Finance Minister Pridiyathorn noted that, "If they (foreign investors) had seen the details (of the foreign investment law), I am sure that they would be happy." Brokers and analysts criticised the move as a political intervention that hurt the economy. The governments of the United States, Canada, Switzerland, Japan, and European Union protested the move.
- Reversing the Thaksin government's "dual track" economic policy and relying too heavily on exports. Deputy Prime Minister Kosit Panpiemras admitted that the Surayud government was not doing enough to stimulate domestic consumption to drive economic growth.
- The approval of debt-relief measures for farmers. This prompted Northeastern farmer leaders from cancelling a planned protests in Bangkok.
- Surayud appointed Thaksin-government Finance Minister Somkid Jatusripitak to head of a government committee charged with promoting King Bhumibol's self-sufficient economy policy to a foreign audience. The appointment provoked great controversy, as critics claimed that the populist economics czar had no role promoting a key principle of the Surayud-government's economic policy. Somkid appointment was supported by General Saprang Kalyanamitr, a powerful member of the junta, and Sondhi Limthongkul of the People's Alliance for Democracy, a long-time colleague of Somkid's. Somkid later decided to resign from the committee, which was then dissolved. Somkid's long-time rival, Finance Minister Pridiyathorn Devakula, denied any role in Somkid's resignation.
- The junta, blaming the Thaksin government's lending to the grassroots sector for creating off-balance sheet government debts, cut off rural lending. However, it soon faced an economic slowdown, and decided to increase rural lending in order to revive the economy.
- Surayud's Cabinet approved a draft bill that would ban the privatisation of several state enterprises, including the Electricity Generating Authority of Thailand (EGAT), the Metropolitan Water Works Authority (MWWA), the Thailand Tobacco Monopoly, and the Government Lottery Office.
- After the coup, Surayud announced that all free trade agreement negotiation and drafting be immediately stopped. However, in February 2007, it gave the go-ahead for the Japan-Thailand Economic Partnership Agreement (JTEPA). The policy U-turn was criticised by many, including Saneh Chamarik of the National Human Rights Commission, Kraisak Choonhavan, Greenpeace Southeast Asia, FTA Watch. The Surayud government was charged with policy corruption. The JTEPA was finally signed on 3 April 2007, in Tokyo, Japan. Protests against the FTA were held at the Japanese embassy in Bangkok.
- Surayud declared that all mobile phone contracts with the government were illegal. The concessions would be renegotiated within a few months, before the military junta was scheduled to hold elections.
- Surayud approved a draft retail business law which gave the Interior Ministry power to curb the expansion of large retailers through its city planning and building codes. The move is part of a set of measures proposed by the Commerce Ministry to halt the rapid expansion of giant retailers, which interest groups blamed for causing the demise of thousands of "mom and pop" stores. However, the president of Thai Retailers Association said that the new retail law would "damage the sentiment and confidence" in the Thai economy, which could cause a domino effect on employment, manufacturing and public spending. "The Cabinet has stepped back to allow 'old traders' in many areas to continue to monopolise the market instead of creating more choices for the consumer," he said.
- Surayud's economic policies failed to stem a slowdown of the economy. In the last quarter of 2006, the economy expanded 3.9%, a drop from the 4.7% recorded before the coup. Applications to build new factories and other facilities dropped 24% in 2006. In February 2007, Thai consumer confidence fell to the lowest point in 5 years. Consumer confidence continued its decline in March. Private sector non-bank foreign debt rose for the first time in 6 years. Thailand's competitiveness dropped to among the worst in the Asia-Pacific region, according to the Switzerland-based Institute for Management Development.

==== Suvarnabhumi Airport ====
Surayud ordered the reopening Don Muang Airport for domestic and international flights. This decision came after allegations that the newly opened Suvarnabhumi Airport alone was incapable of handling future traffic volume and that the airport was unsafe. The decision met with strong opposition from Airports of Thailand, the Civil Aviation Department, the Board of Airline Representatives in Thailand (BAR), the International Air Transport Association (IATA), the Thai Airways International labour union, and many domestic and international airlines, including Thai Airways and the Star Alliance. 60 airlines threatened to halt flights to Thailand if they were forced to move back to Don Muang airport.

A two-week investigation led by Tortrakul Yomnak, a chief engineer for Airports of Thailand and prominent supporter of the anti-Thaksin movement, found that the runway was safe, and that cracks could be repaired in as little as a few hours. At the beginning of the investigation, Tortrakul had warned that the airport might need to be closed for three years. However, Admiral Bannawit Keng-rien, chairman of the National Legislative Assembly's airport committee, urged Surayud to close down Suvarnabhumi. Surayud's decision to reopen Don Muang was based on his personal advisors, without waiting for the Ministry of Transport or Airports of Thailand to finish their studies.

A completed study by the AoT showed that the cost of fixing 60 identified problems at the airport would be less than 1% of the total airline cost and the problems could be fixed in up to four to five years. Dr. Narupol Chaiyut, a member of a committee overseeing service problems at the new airport, estimated that 70% of the problems would be fixed within 2007.

Surayud and AoT Chairman General Saprang Kalayanamitr refused to authorise urgent repairs on the airport tarmac, despite warnings from engineers. Karun Chandrarangsu, president of the Engineering Institute of Thailand (and a close relative to Srisuk Chandrarangsu, who was a former AOT board member, which was implicated in several corruption allegations, such as CTX and King Power scandals, and now being investigated) noted, "Suvarnabhumi is like a patient in a coma who continues to suffer from severe bleeding. Stopping the blood flow now is more urgent and important than debating what caused the injury." The Engineering Institute of Thailand sent a formal warning to AoT in November 2006 about the urgent need to drain water from beneath the tarmac, and that immediate action should be taken. "The AOT did nothing about the problem," Suebsak Promboon of the EIT noted. "The situation might not have become this bad if the water had been drained then." Suebsak Promboon, a senior foundation engineer and a member of the Tortrakul Yomnak-led airport tarmac inspection panel, accused the AOT of refusing to take any actions to solve the problems at the airport.

==== Human rights ====
- Censorship of broadcast television. Troops were dispatched to all television stations on the night of the coup and remain there as of late December 2006. An interview with the late Nuamthong Phaiwan broadcast by television channel ITV came to an abrupt end after the Director of Army-owned Royal Thai Army Radio and Television called the station to warn them against the broadcast. Additional troops were dispatched to "keep order" at the station. Broadcast media were to stop airing news about former prime minister Thaksin Shinawatra and his associates. Military control over broadcast television was tighter than at any time in the past 15 years.
- Censorship of community radio. Thousands of community radio stations were shut down after the coup. Community radio operators were only allowed to rebroadcast if they reported in the "spirit of national unity." The junta retained the authority to shut down any station at any time.
- Massive censorship of the internet. Pre-coup, the government blocked 2,475 websites, while as of January 2007, the government blocked 13,435 websites—an increase of a shade under 443%. In addition, the popular Midnight University web board was shut down for what the government claimed were posts offensive to the monarchy. Numerous anti-coup, anti-junta, and pro-Thaksin websites were blocked.
- Strict execution of the CNS's ban against all political activities.
- The establishment of a 14,000-strong special operations force with a mandate to control anti-junta protests. The 556 million baht fund allocation came from a request by the Council for National Security. The rapid deployment force began operations on 1 December 2006. Surayud refused to explain why his Cabinet approved funding of the force after it had already started, which was contrary to PM's Office directives. Government spokesman Yongyuth Mayalarp promised that the force would be dissolved on 30 September 2007, along with the CNS. The funds would be diverted from the Defense Ministry and Police Office, but if those two agencies lacked funding, they would be diverted from the government's reserve fund for emergency situations. Yongyuth revealed that no Cabinet members questioned the use of the fund. General Saprang Kallayanamit, assistant Secretary-General of the CNS, was appointed Commander of the force.
- Arresting and impeding anti-coup/anti-junta protesters. Several arrests occurred in the immediate aftermath of the coup. On 15 March 2007, five political activists were arrested in Sanam Luang and their stage demolished. The government also violently cracked down on protesters at the house of Prem Tinsulanonda, and arrested several protesters, including an interim National Human Rights Commissioner and former chief justice of the Criminal Court. Afterwards, Surayud, along with his entire Cabinet, went to Prem's house to apologise to him for "apologise for failing to take good care of him." Surayud accused the protesters of trying to "bring down the highest institution of the country."
- Surayud defended the detention of Chiang Mai protester Sombat Boonngarm-anong (head of the Midnight University) after he criticised the junta and the Surayud government in public. Sombat was not allowed to make any phone calls during his detention and was only allowed to receive a phone call from former Chiang Rai Senator Tuanjai Deethet. He also said the military did not allow him to drink anything during his detention. Sombat claimed that the director of Phitsanulok Military Intelligence told him he had committed a crime against the state by disseminating one-sided information to the public and was liable for the death penalty under Article 116 of the Criminal Code.
- Censorship and manipulation of the media. The government cancelled the most popular program on state-owned broadcaster's MCOT's Modernine TV, Khui Khui Khao. The anti-Thaksin movement claimed the program's host, prominent political commentator Sorrayuth Suthassanachinda, was a supporter of the overthrown premier. A daily slot was given for anti-Thaksin crusader Sondhi Limthongkul's "Yam Fao Paen Din", a show that media reformers called a junta "propaganda tool." Lese majeste charges against Sondhi filed prior to the coup were dropped, admittedly for no legal reason. Seri Wongmontha and Boonyod Sukthintai, both prominent members of the anti-Thaksin People's Alliance for Democracy, were given program slots.
- Censoring nationalised television station TITV. TITV was ordered not to produce any news reports that ran counter to government policies. Government officials attended all news briefing to make sure no news content conflicted with the junta's interests.
- Forbidding motorcycle taxi drivers in Bangkok and adjacent provinces from participating in anti-coup/anti-junta rallies. Thousands of members of the Assembly of the Poor (AOP) were also prevented by military and government officials from boarding buses from their home provinces to stage demonstrations in Bangkok. Authorities cited the lack of paper permit required under martial law (still in effect in more than 30 provinces at the time of the planned protests).
- Surayud's ICT Minister Sitthichai Pookaiyaudom claimed that criticising the president of the Privy Council was a threat to national security, justifying the shutdown of any websites containing critical material.
- The Surayud government pushed through a cyber crime law that criminalised any attempt to get around government internet censors to access any of the tens of thousands of sites censored for supposedly moral or political purposes. The law also made it a serious crime for service providers to withhold IP addresses from government requests.
- The approval of a law that would imprison anyone found guilty of forwarding a pornographic e-mail for up to three years.
- The shutdown of a radio station that broadcast a call-in from deposed Premier Thaksin. Thaksin made what was his first post-coup statement on Thai broadcast media on 16 May 2007 when he called into Bangkok's 87.75FM and 92.75FM community radio stations. The next day, officials from the junta, the government's Public Relations Department (PRD), and the Internal Security Operations Command inspected the community radio station. The station then went off the air.
- The arrest of anti-junta White Dove 2000 protesters in Chiang Mai in May 2007. The protesters claimed that they had sought permission from the Deputy Governor and the Third Army Region Commander to use the demonstration site. Military officials claimed that the protesters had documents and CDs with content that was deemed likely to instigate political conflict.
- The establishment of a 700,000 strong network of junta supporters to prevent anti-junta demonstrators from allegedly inciting violence. "The idea is to take out as many as possible prospective demonstrators. In a public rally with less than 50,000 participants, there will be no problem," said the head of the ISOC.
- The repeal of junta restrictions against organising protests on 9 November 2006. However, martial law has been lifted in most of the country.
- Censorship of Somtow Sucharitkul's opera Ayodhya. It was thought that the on-stage death of the demon-king, Thotsakan, would constitute a bad omen. Somtow, a harsh critic of the deposed Prime Minister Thaksin Shinawatra, criticised the move but agreed to modify the scene.
- 15 January 2007: The military government has censored the interview of Thaksin Shinawatra on CNN in Thailand.

==== Other ====
- The granting of unprecedented salaries for the leaders of the military junta.
- Expanding Bangkok's mass transit rail network by 5 new routes, using the same amount as budgeted by the deposed Thaksin government.
- On Friday 18 May 2007, Surayud claimed that if the country were politically peaceful, generations elections under a new constitution could be held earlier than 16 or 23 December. On Saturday 19 May 2007, he claimed he had misspoken, and said it would be impossible to hold general elections before mid-December. He noted that he had just realised that earlier elections would conflict with preparations for King Bhumibol's 80th birthday celebrations on 5 December.
- Submitting draft legislation that would force children from age one to apply for and carry identification cards to the legislature. Failure to apply for the card would carry a 500 baht fine while not producing the card to officials would be punishable by a 200 baht fine.

=== Thaksin Shinawatra ===
Surayud warned deposed Premier Thaksin Shinawatra several times against returning to Thailand, calling his return "a threat". During a November 2006 trip to China for the ASEAN-China Summit, Surayud refused to meet Thaksin, who was also in China at the time. Surayud later denied Thaksin the opportunity to return to Thailand to contest in eventual elections, and said that the appropriate time for him to return would be "after a year," when a newly elected government was already in place.

Thaksin's diplomatic passport was revoked by the Foreign Ministry on 31 December 2006 after the government claimed he had engaged in political activities while in exile. Thai embassies were ordered not to facilitate his travels. Traditionally, all former prime ministers and foreign ministers of Thailand were permitted to hold on to their diplomatic passports for life.

Thaksin later publicly announced that he was quitting politics. Surayud's Defense Minister later announced that the junta would refuse Thaksin's reconciliation offer, claiming that Thailand was being threatened by "ill-intentioned people" and capitalism.

Surayud's government completely purged all senior military officers perceived as loyal to the Thaksin government, replacing them with officers trusted by the new regime.

In April 2007, during an interview where reporters asked Surayud what he would say to Thaksin if he could meet him in person, Surayud responded, "I would say please don't ever come back."

=== Council for National Security ===
The Surayud government allowed the Council for National Security to interfere with many government responsibilities, including the transfer of civil servants. The CNS was allowed to control a nationwide reshuffle of the civil service in April 2007 in order to weed out officials "clinging" to the deposed "Thaksin-regime".

Surayud also authorised the removal of police chief Kowit Wattana from his position in early February 2007. Kowit had also been police chief under the ousted government of Thaksin Shinawatra.

In March, junta leader Sonthi asked Surayud to declare emergency rule in Bangkok in response to the protests by the founders of PTV. In an interview, Sonthi noted that the protests, attended by approximately 1,500-3,000 people, had so far been peaceful but that he was afraid the movement could lead to "mutiny and chaos in the country." CNS Spokesman Sansern Kaewkamnerd asked, "What will we do if the numbers of protesters go beyond 100,000? It will greatly damage the country's image." Emergency powers allowed the government to ban public gatherings, impose curfews and censor local news reports.

On 3 April 2007, Surayud approved a 15% pay rise (on top of an earlier 15% pay rise) for members of the CNS, as a "special reward" for their "honesty, tolerance and dedication on weekdays and weekends."

Despite this, relations between Surayud and the CNS deteriorated. Rumours swirled in mid-April 2007 that the CNS would overthrow the government. However, in a meeting with the CNS President, Surayud declared, "Don't ever think of launching another coup. If you utter only one word, then I am ready to resign."

== Criticism ==
Besides being heavily criticised for gaining power through the 2006 coup and his subsequent actions as premier, Surayud has been accused of forest encroachment and corruption.

=== Forest encroachment ===
Surayud was accused of breaching the Forestry Act and the National Forest Reserves Act by illegally owning forest reserve land in Yaithiang Mountain of Nakhon Ratchasima province. When Surayud was Commander of the 2nd Army Region, he was sold the plot of land for 50,000 baht. He later transferred ownership of the plot to his wife. Surayud vowed to resign and return the land (which he did not deny owning) if found guilty. He was defended by Interior Minister Aree Wongarya, who claimed, "Gen Surayud purchased the land from someone else so the question has to be posed to the first owner whether the land is reserved."

National Human Rights Commissioner and Thaksin sympathiser Jaran Ditthapichai noted, "I cannot agree to have someone call himself a man of morality and sufficiency if he built a fancy house in a forest reserve."

However, the National Counter Corruption Commission (NCCC) refused to investigate the land encroachment charges, claiming that the statute of limitations on the case had run out. NCCC member Klanarong Chantik noted that Surayud retired from military service in 2003 whereas the charges were made 4 years after his retirement, and that the NCCC could not legally investigate an officer for alleged wrongdoing beyond two years after retirement.

In February 2010 after demonstrations by the "Red Shirts" at Khao Yaithiang Mountain, Surayud returned the land to the Royal Forestry Department, without any removals of structures or plants, weeks before a formal notice from the department was issued. The plot of land is now under the care of the Royal Forestry Department after Surayud moved out. However, up until now no legal action has been taken by Thai authorities against Surayud or other landowners of similar type all over Thailand.

=== Corruption ===
Surayud, an avid collector of model trains, was accused of illegally acquiring four train compartments for his resort home in Kho Yaithiang mountain, Nakhon Ratchasima. Surayud claimed that he had more than 4 compartments, but they were all in his residence in Bangkok and were all models driven by household class electricity of 220V.

However, Thai-language newspaper Khaosod published a photo on the front page of its edition of 26 December 2006 which showed a building resembling a railway carriage near Surayud's resort home. The National Counter Corruption Committee was petitioned to scrutinise the land at Surayud's retreat residence, but refused to take action (see above). Before the end of his tenure as prime minister, Surayud invited dozens of reporters from various fields to visit and have a lunch at his disputed Kho Yaithiang home, where they realised that what seemed to be train carriages were only a resort building of his friend nearby viewed from a particular angle.

While Surayud was frequently accused of corruption, many in the business community believed otherwise. A poll conducted in January 2007 found that 66% of business people thought that local corruption would increase, with only 10.5% thinking that it would decrease. However, only about 14% believed that leading figures in Surayud's administration were corrupt.

== Royal decorations ==
Surayud has received the following royal decorations in the Honours System of Thailand:

- 2018 – Knight Grand Cross of the Most Illustrious Order of Chula Chom Klao
- 1995 – Knight Grand Cordon (Special Class) of the Most Exalted Order of the White Elephant
- 1992 – Knight Grand Cordon (Special Class) of The Most Noble Order of the Crown of Thailand
- 2019 – King Rama X Royal Cypher Medal, Third Class
- 1990 – Rama Mala Medal of the Honourable Order of Rama
- 1974 – Freemen Safeguarding Medal (First Class)
- 1989 – Border Service Medal
- 1978 – Chakra Mala Medal
- 2006 – Red Cross Medal of Appreciation, First Class (Gold Medal)

=== Foreign honours ===
- Singapore :
  - Darjah Utama Bakti Cemerlang (Tentera)
  - Pingat Jasa Gemilang (Tentera)
- Malaysia :
  - Knight Grand Commander of the Order of Military Service (P.G.A.T.)
- Sweden :
  - Commander Grand Cross of the Royal Order of the Polar Star
- Denmark :
  - Commander 1st Class of the Order of the Dannebrog
- United States :
  - Commander of the Legion of Merit
- Indonesia:
  - Army Meritorious Service Star, 1st Class
- South Korea :
  - Tongil Medal of the Order of National Security Merit, 1st Class
- Cambodia :
  - Grand Cross of the Royal Order of Sahametrei
- Kelantan, Malaysia :
  - Knight Grand Commander of the Order of the Crown of Kelantan or Star of Muhammad (S.P.M.K.)

Military offices
Preceded by Chettha Thanajaro	Commander-in-Chief of the Royal Thai Army; 1998–2002	Succeeded by Somtad Attanan
Preceded by Narong Yuttavong	Supreme Commander of the Royal Thai Armed Forces; 2002–2003	Succeeded by Somtad Attanan
Political offices
Preceded by Sonthi Boonyaratglin as President of the Administrative Reform Council of Thailand	Prime Minister of Thailand; 2006–2008	Succeeded by Samak Sundaravej
Preceded by Prem Tinsulanonda	President of the Privy Council of Thailand; 2019-	Incumbent
