= Japan–Thailand Economic Partnership Agreement =

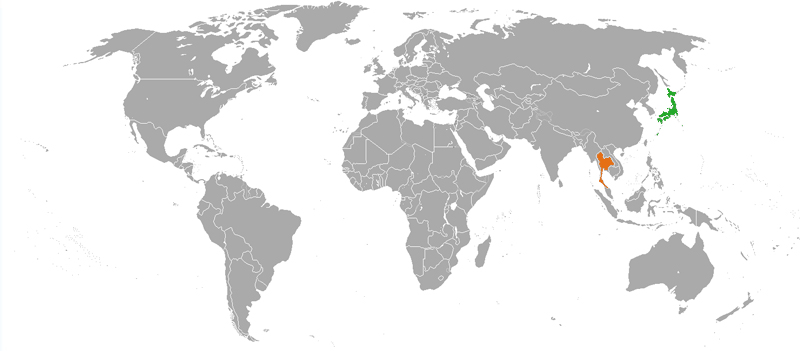
- Type: Trade agreement
- Signed: 3 April 2007; 19 years ago
- Parties: Japan; Thailand

The Japan–Thailand Economic Partnership Agreement (JTEPA) is a free-trade agreement between Thailand and Japan. The agreement was a deal that would eliminate tariffs on more than 90 per cent of bilateral trade within 10 years. It was signed on April 3, 2007 in Tokyo, Japan by the Prime Minister of Japan Shinzō Abe and the visiting Prime Minister of Thailand, Surayud Chulanont. The agreement was the fourth in a series of similar bilateral trade agreements made by Japan, following deals with Singapore, Malaysia, and the Philippines.

== Agreement Details ==
Japan would immediately remove the tariffs on almost all industrial products from Thailand. Thailand will immediately remove the tariffs on half of all Japanese steel imports. The remainder would be duty-free by 2017. By 2012, Japanese auto parts except five will become duty-free. The remaining five will become duty-free in over the next 7 years. By 2011, Thailand will immediately reduce the tariffs on Japanese automobiles with an engine displacement of 3000 cc or larger to 60 percent from 80 percent. The two countries will hold talks again in 2009 on total tariff elimination for those vehicles in the mid-2010s. The expectation was that Japanese companies would be able to sell more cars and electronic goods in Thailand, while Thailand would benefit from Japanese firms outsourcing basic manufacturing there.

Japan removed the tariffs on processed shrimps and tropical fruits such as mango and papaya from Thailand. Over the next few years, Thailand would remove the tariffs on Japanese fruits such as apples, pears and yams. Japan would also reduce the tariff on Thai boneless chicken to 8.5 percent down from the current 11.9 percent and on cooked chicken to 3 percent d from 6 percent. To the disappointment of Thai producers the agreement did not cover sensitive agricultural products of Japan such as rice, wheat and dairy products where Thai products competed with the Japanese agricultural industry.

Thai negotiators were hoping for greater labour mobility, but the agreement only had the limited deal that Japan will allow more Thai cooks to work in Japan by reducing the required minimum work experience of 10 years to 5 years.
