= Anupong Paochinda =

Thai politician and military officer (born 1949)

Anupong Paochinda MPCh MWM
- อนุพงษ์ เผ่าจินดา
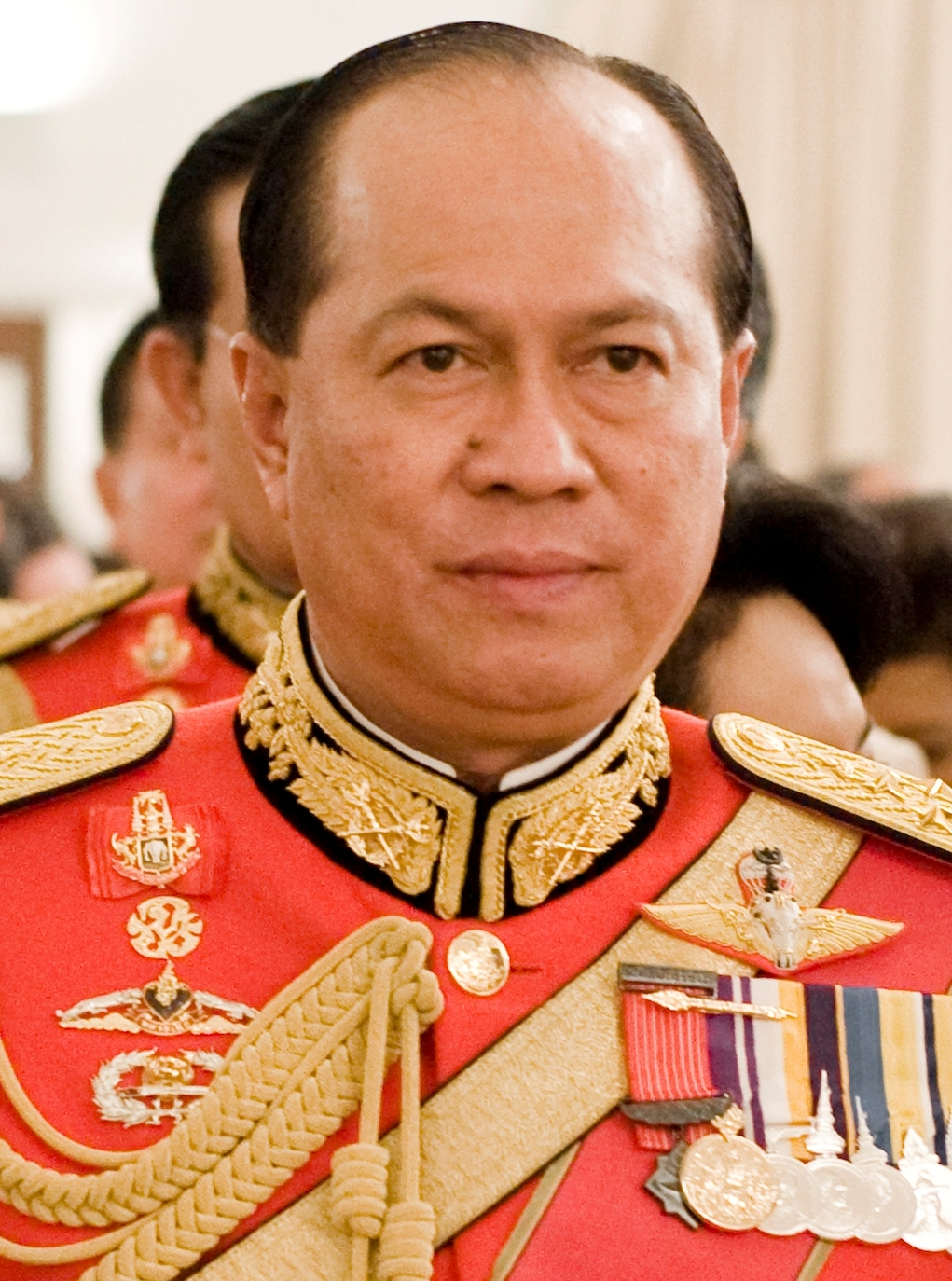
- Anupong in 2010

Minister of Interior
- In office 30 August 2014 – 1 September 2023
- Prime Minister: Prayut Chan-o-cha
- Preceded by: Charupong Ruangsuwan
- Succeeded by: Anutin Charnvirakul

Commander-in-chief of the Royal Thai Army
- In office 1 October 2007 – 30 September 2010
- Preceded by: Sonthi Boonyaratglin
- Succeeded by: Prayut Chan-o-cha

Personal details
- Born: 10 October 1949 (age 76) Bangkok, Thailand
- Party: Independent
- Spouse: Kunlaya Paochinda
- Children: 2
- Education: Armed Forces Academies Preparatory School; Chulachomklao Royal Military Academy
- Nickname: Pok (ป็อก)

Military service
- Allegiance: Thailand
- Branch/service: Royal Thai Army
- Years of service: 1972–2010
- Rank: General
- Commands: First Army; Royal Thai Army
- Battles/wars: Communist insurgency in Thailand; Vietnamese border raids in Thailand
- Awards: Freemen Safeguarding Medal (Second Class, Second Category); Border Service Medal; Chakra Mala Medal; Pingat Jasa Gemilang (Tentera)

Anupong Paochinda (Thai: อนุพงษ์ เผ่าจินดา; RTGS: Anuphong Phaochinda; born 10 October 1949) is a Thai politician and retired army officer. He held the position of Commander-in-Chief of the Royal Thai Army from 2007 until his retirement on 30 September 2010.

While a lieutenant general holding the position of 1st Army Region Commander, Anupong was an appointed member of the Council for National Security, the group that staged the 2006 Thai coup d'état and deposed the caretaker government of Prime Minister Thaksin Shinawatra.

After the coup d'état in 2014, Anupong became an advisor to the junta which calls itself "National Council for Peace and Order" (NCPO), and in August 2014 he became minister of interior in General Prayut Chan-o-cha's post-coup government.

== Education ==
Anupong completed his primary education at Bangkok's Phanthasuksa Pitthaya School in 1965 and Thai-British curriculum at Amnuay Silpa School the following year. He gained a military education from the Thailand's Armed Forces Academies Preparatory School in 1967 (Class 10, a classmate of prime minister-to-be Thaksin Shinawatra) and from Chulachomklao Royal Military Academy in 1972 (Class 21).

He holds degrees in political science from Ramkhamhaeng University (1993), and a master's degree from the Thailand's National Institute of Development Administration (2004) and study high military education at National Defence College of Thailand's Class 26.

== Career ==
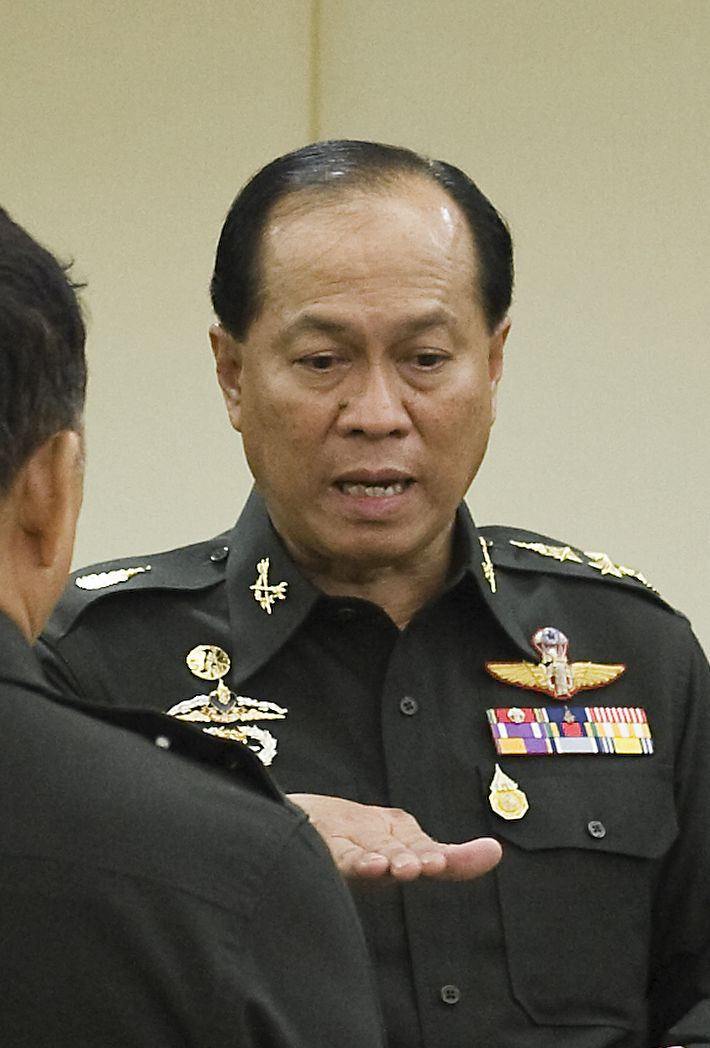
Anupong Paochinda when he was an army officer

Anupong has been appointed to many military offices, including inter alia, commandant of the 21st Infantry Regiment (Queen's Guard), commandant of the 1st Army Division, deputy commander and commander of the 1st Army Region. Anupong was selected by the Prime Minister to hold the position of the commander in chief of the Royal Thai Army on 19 September 2007, and promoted to the position by Bhumibol Adulyadej on 1 October 2007. He succeeded coup leader General Sonthi Boonyaratglin.

Like his direct successor General Prayut and former defence minister Prawit Wongsuwan, Anupong is a member of the "Eastern Tigers" clique within the army. Most of them—like Anupong—started their career in the 2nd Infantry Division (headquartered in eastern Thailand), especially in the 21st Infantry Regiment (Queen's Guards).

On 2 October 2008, Prime Minister Samak Sundaravej, following a civil insurgency of the People's Alliance for Democracy ("Yellow Shirts") demanding his resignation or impeachment, imposed a state of emergency throughout Bangkok and appointed Anupong as the leader of the officers in charge. After the Constitutional Court verdict dissolving the People's Power Party and two of its coalition parties, Anupong reportedly led closed-door meetings, convincing Newin Chidchob's Bhumjaithai Party to desert the government coalition, and organising a new parliamentary majority led by the Democrat Party and Abhisit Vejjajiva.

On 14 January 2010, Anupong ordered the suspension of Major General Khattiya Sawasdipol, the controversial "Seh Daeng", after an inquiry committee found that Khattiya had publicly proclaimed his loyalty to the United Front of Democracy Against Dictatorship ("Red Shirts"), a political group supporting Thaksin Shinawatra, breaching military discipline. The following day, Anupong's office in the Royal Thai Army headquarters was attacked by unknown parties using an M79 grenade launcher. The unoccupied office was slightly damaged. During the 2010 "Red Shirts" uprising, the government of Abhisit Vejjajiva appointed General Anupong chief officer of the Centre for the Resolution of the Emergency Situation (CRES), in charge of restoring law and order. Thus he was responsible for the bloody military crackdown on the protest movement in mid-May 2010.

Anupong retired on 30 September 2010. He was succeeded by General Prayut Chan-o-cha.

After the 22 May 2014 coup d'état, the junta—led by Prayut—appointed Anupong a member of its "advisory board" overseeing security issues. Three months later, on 30 August, he was appointed minister of interior in General Prayut's military-dominated government.

On 31 August 2023 Anupong expired from the post of Minister of Interior due to the election result that Srettha Thavisin from Pheu Thai Party won the 2023 Thai general election. He has already decided to retire from politics because he has been in office since 2014, a total period of 9 years. As a result, he is the third longest-serving Minister of the Interior after Prince Damrong Rajanubhab and Field Marshal Praphas Charusathien respectively.

== Personal life ==
Anupong is married to Kunlaya Paochinda (Thai: กุลยา เผ่าจินดา). They have two children.

== In popular culture ==
- In Thirteen Lives (2022), a biographical survival drama film directed by Ron Howard, he is portrayed by Vithaya Pansringarm.
- In Thai Cave Rescue (2022), a 6-part limited series produced by Netflix, directed by Kevin Tancharoen and Nattawut Poonpiriya, he is portrayed as cameo by Sumet Ong-art.

== See also ==
- 2008 Thai political crisis
- 2006 Thai coup d'état
- Council for Democratic Reform
- Council for National Security

Military offices
Preceded by Sonthi Boonyaratglin	Commander-in-Chief of the Royal Thai Army; 2007–2010	Succeeded by Prayut Chan-o-cha
