= Sonthi Boonyaratglin =

Thai general (born 1946)

- สนธิ บุญยรัตกลิน
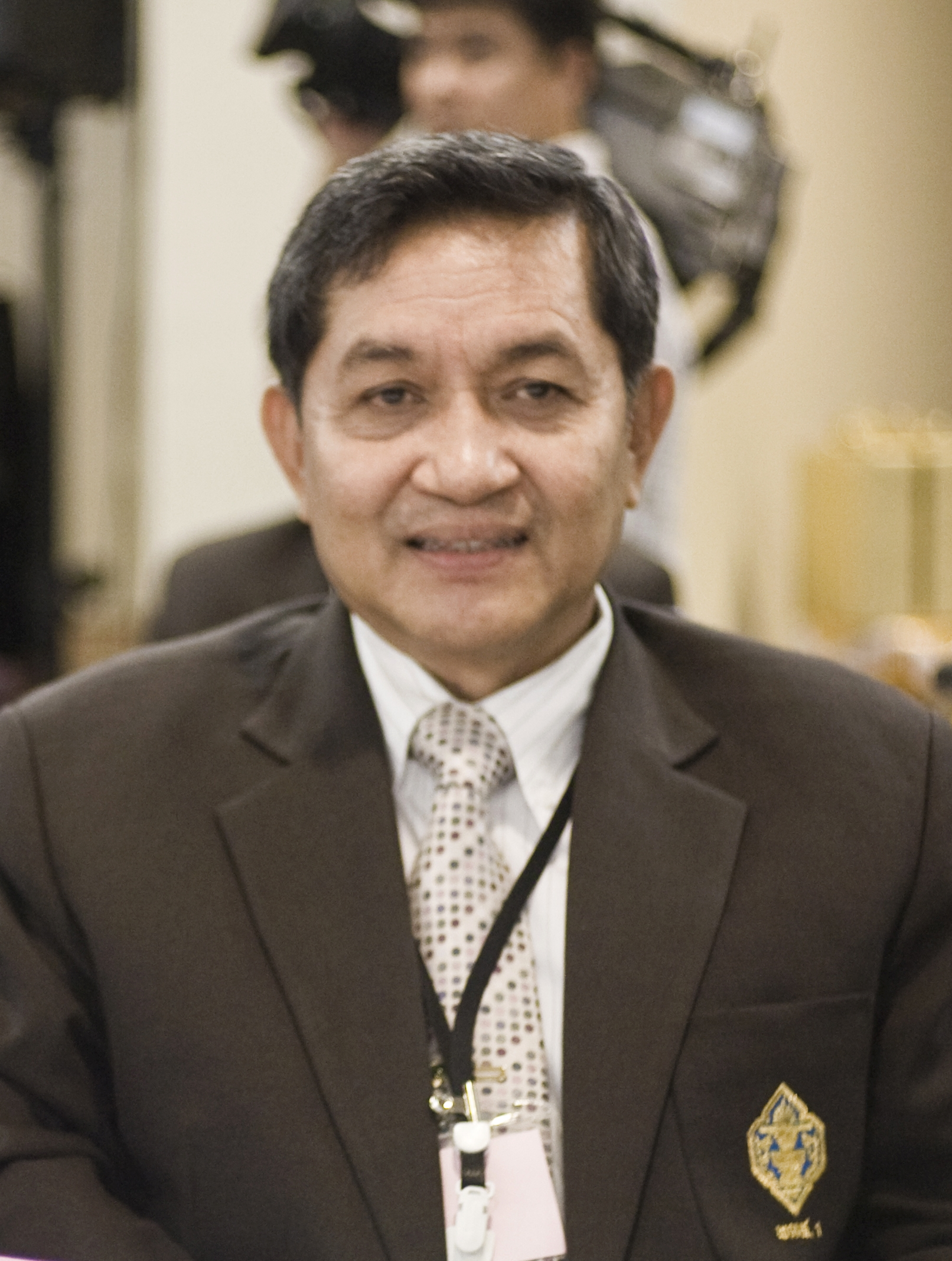
- Boonyaratglin in August 2009

Acting Prime Minister of Thailand (Note: as head of the Council for Democratic Reform)
- De facto 19 September 2006 – 1 October 2006
- Monarch: Bhumibol Adulyadej
- Preceded by: Thaksin Shinawatra (as Prime Minister)
- Succeeded by: Surayud Chulanont (as Prime Minister)

Deputy Prime Minister of Thailand
- In office 1 October 2007 – 28 January 2008
- Prime Minister: Surayud Chulanont

President of the Council for National Security
- In office 1 October 2006 – 1 October 2007
- Monarch: Bhumibol Adulyadej
- Deputy: Chalit Pukbhasuk; Sathiraphan Keyanon; Kowit Wattana
- Preceded by: Himself (as Head of the Council for Democratic Reform)
- Succeeded by: Chalit Pukbhasuk (acting)

Commander-in-Chief of the Army
- In office 1 October 2005 – 30 September 2007
- Preceded by: Prawit Wongsuwan
- Succeeded by: Anupong Paochinda

Personal details
- Born: 2 October 1946 (age 80) Pathum Thani, Thailand
- Party: Chartthaipattana (2018–present)
- Other political affiliations: Matubhum (2009–2018)
- Spouses: Sukanya Boonyaratglin; Piyada Boonyaratglin
- Domestic partner: Wanna Boonyaratglin
- Children: 6
- Education: Armed Forces Academies Preparatory School; Chulachomklao Royal Military Academy; National Defence College of Thailand; Ramkhamhaeng University (Ph.D.)

Military service
- Branch/service: Royal Thai Army
- Years of service: 1969–2007
- Rank: General
- Commands: Commander-in-Chief
- Battles/wars: Vietnam War; Communist insurgency in Thailand; South Thailand insurgency
- Awards: Victory Medal - Vietnam War, with flames; Freemen Safeguarding Medal (Second Class, Second Category); Border Service Medal; Chakra Mala Medal; Commendation Medal, with "V" device; Gallantry Cross, with palm

Sonthi Boonyaratglin (Thai: สนธิ บุญยรัตกลิน, RTGS: Sonthi Bunyaratkalin, IPA: [sǒn.tʰíʔ bun.já.rát.kà.lin]; born 2 October 1946) is a Thai former general who was Commander-in-Chief of the Royal Thai Army and former head of the Council for Democratic Reform, the military junta that ruled the kingdom. He was the first Muslim in charge of the army of the mostly Buddhist country. On 19 September 2006, he became the de facto head of government of Thailand after overthrowing the elected government in a coup d'état. After retiring from the Army in 2007, he became deputy prime minister, in charge of national security.

Sonthi is a multimillionaire and has two wives, Sukanya and Piyada, despite legal prohibitions against bigamy.

== Education and early career ==
Sonthi Boonyaratglin graduated from the 6th Class of the Armed Forces Academies Preparatory School. He graduated from Chulachomklao Royal Military Academy in 1969 as part of Class 17 and was commissioned into the Royal Army Infantry Corps. He went on to lead several top units, including the elite Special Warfare Command based in Lopburi province.

In August 2004, Sonthi was appointed Deputy Army Commander. Against public expectations, Sonthi was promoted to Army Commander in October 2005. Sonthi's fast rise was backed by retired armed forces Supreme Commander General Surayud Chulanont (with whom he had served while leading the Special Warfare Command and Privy Council President General Prem Tinsulanonda). Both serve as advisers to King Bhumibol Adulyadej. He later received a doctor's degree in political science from the open-admission Ramkhamhaeng University.

== Conflicts with Thaksin Shinawatra ==
As Army Commander, General Sonthi repeatedly assured the public that the army would not interfere in the political crisis, although he has said that "His Majesty must have been saddened" by the nation's political problems. He has also protested Thaksin's unsuccessful attempt to promote a large number of his own former classmates from Class 10 of the Armed Forces Academies Preparatory School to army units responsible for Bangkok's security.

The 2006 annual military reshuffle was delayed due to the political crisis, as caretaker prime minister Thaksin Shinawatra denied that he planned to remove Sonthi as Army Commander. Despite this, Sonthi consolidating his personal power base by transferring out 129 mid-ranking officers under generals that he thought were loyal to the Prime Minister. Some observers saw this as a message to the Government that Sonthi was still firmly in charge of the Army.

As late as May 2006, Sonthi publicly denied the need for a military coup:

Whenever soldiers get involved in politics, it seems that the nation's problems begin to escalate and become worse. Military officers, accordingly, must step back from politics. With that firm and clear stance, I assure everyone that there definitely won't be a coup.

== Southern Thailand insurgency ==
After being appointed Army Commander in 2005, Sonthi expressed confidence that he could resolve the insurgency. He claimed that he would take a "new and effective" approach to a crisis and that "The army is informed [of who the insurgents are] and will carry out their duties." Sonthi was granted an extraordinary increase in executive powers to combat unrest in the far South. However, up to 19 September 2006, the Army admitted that they had no idea who the insurgents were. The drastic escalation of the insurgency during his leadership of the Army led to much public criticism of Army efforts.

While assigned to the South, Sonthi suggested that former communist insurgents might be playing a role in the unrest. Leaders of the southern provinces displayed skepticism over his suggestion and investigations did not reveal any communist link.

Sonthi was also blamed for failing to rescue two teachers who had been kidnapped and severely beaten by a mob in May 2006. One of them, 24-year-old Juling Pangamoon from Chiang Rai, was long in a coma and attracted fame for the attention paid to her by the royal family of Thailand, finally dying from her brutal beating in January 2009.

In August 2006, after 22 commercial banks were simultaneously bombed in Yala province, Sonthi announced that he would break with government policy and negotiate with the leaders of the insurgency. However, he noted that "We still don't know who is the real head of the militants we are fighting with." In a press conference the next day, he attacked the government for criticizing him for trying to negotiate with the anonymous insurgents, and demanded that the government "Free the military and let it do the job." Afterwards, insurgents bombed 6 department stores in Hat Yai city, which up until then had been free of insurgent activities. As always, the identity of the insurgents was not revealed. On 8 September, Deputy Prime Minister Chitchai Wannasathit promised to give Sonthi increased powers to better deal with the insurgency. However, by 19 September 2006, the Army admitted that it still was unsure whom to negotiate with.

Three days later, Sonthi led a coup against the government of Prime Minister Thaksin Shinawatra. Sonthi's former superiors, Deputy Prime Minister for national security Chitchai Wannasathit and Defense Minister Thammarak Isarangkura na Ayudhaya were immediately arrested.

Despite escalating violence, in May 2007 Sonthi started withdrawing troops from the South, replacing them with territorial defence volunteers. He did not say why the regular army was to be reduced in the South.

== Military coup ==
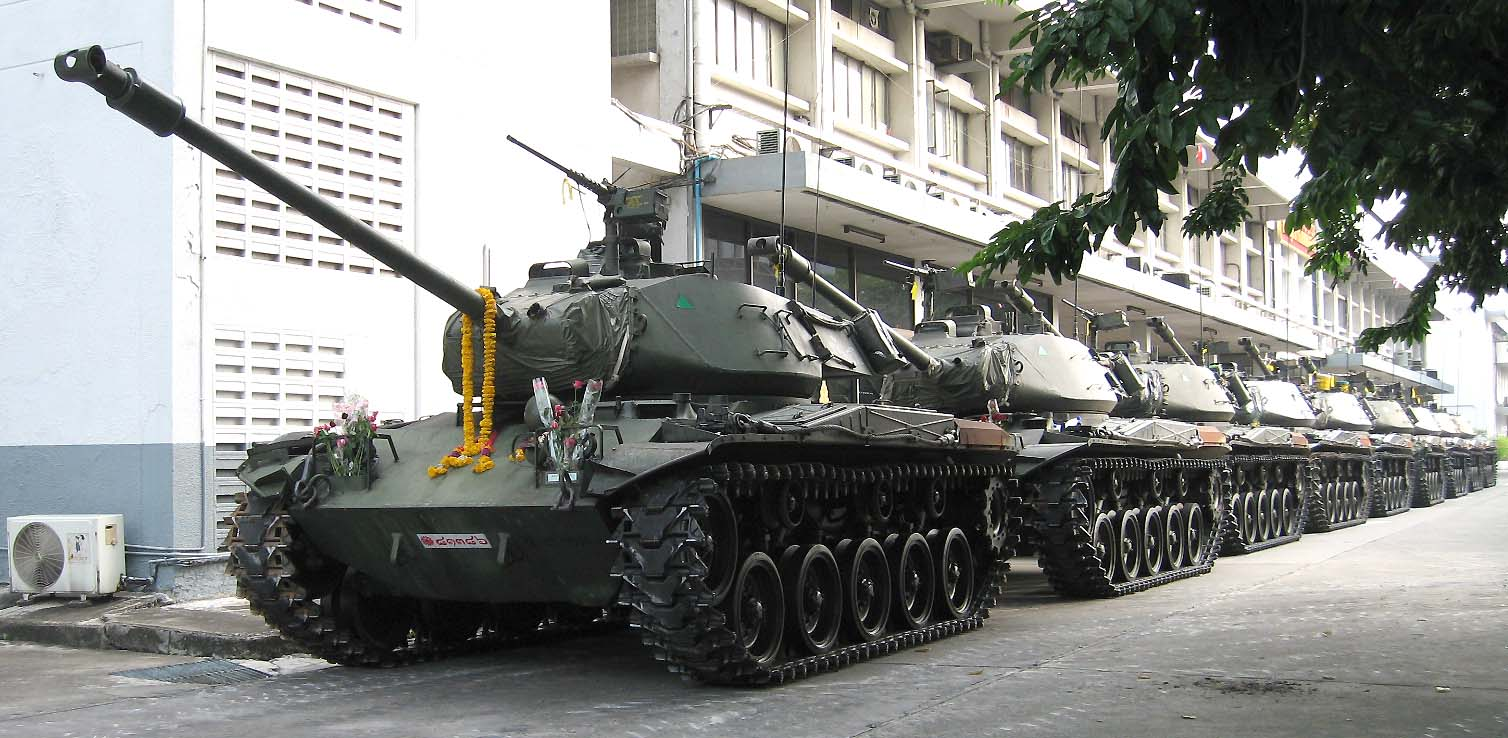
General Sonthi lead the coup d'état by bringing tanks to deploy at the First Army Area in 2006

During the peak of the Thailand political crisis in February 2006, Sondhi Limthongkul, leader of the anti-Thaksin People's Alliance for Democracy (PAD), personally met Sonthi to request that the military intervene in the crisis. Afterwards, Sondhi claimed that Sonthi listened to him attentively and promised to consider his request. Sonthi later claimed that he was misled into receiving Sondhi, and had no intention to endorse the anti-government activists.

On 19 September 2006, Sonthi and other military leaders launched a military coup against the government of Thaksin Shinawatra. The coup-makers originally called themselves the Council for Democratic Reform. Tanks surrounded Government House in Bangkok and the military took over all broadcast media. Thaksin declared a state of emergency from New York City (where he had been attending a meeting of the United Nations), but his broadcast was cut in mid-sentence when the military seized the television station.

Sonthi dissolved Cabinet, Parliament, and the Constitutional Court, and temporarily gave himself powers equivalent to prime minister. He declared that the council would hand over power in two weeks. On the second day of the coup, he received a formal mandate from King Bhumibol Adulyadej.

General Sonthi later said in an interview that the coup was originally planned for 20 September, to coincide with a major anti-Thaksin rally also planned for that day. He cited the "Portuguese example" in which anti-government rallies coincided with a successful military rebellion which overthrew King Manuel II of Portugal and established the Portuguese First Republic. The coup was moved up to 19 September, when Thaksin was still in New York. Sonthi also stated that the coup was not an urgent measure mooted just a couple of days earlier. Sonthi also claimed that during a lunch that Thaksin had with the commanders of the armed forces, Thaksin had asked him "Will you stage a coup?" Sonthi replied: "I will." This contradicted earlier public statements where he denied that the military would stage a coup. He also revealed that as early as his 11 September visit to Myanmar, he had been wary of his personal safety. During flight, he carried a concealed pistol and sat next to the entrance to the cockpit. Sonthi and other junta leaders flew to Chiang Mai on an Air Force C-130 on 3 November 2006 to visit a prominent fortune-teller and perform a religious ceremony to ward off bad luck over their staging of the coup. The fortune teller, Varin Buaviratlert, had been Sonthi's long-time personal fortune-teller, and had foretold Sonthi's rise to become Army Commander. Amid falling popularity, Sonthi sent his wife and several CNS leaders to visit her on 1 April 2007.

Sonthi completely purged the military of all senior officers perceived as loyal to the Thaksin government, replacing them with officers that he personally trusted.

== Permanent constitution ==
In December 2006, junta chief Sonthi Boonyaratglin issued several guidelines for the permanent constitution being drafted by the CNS's drafting body. These included:

- Restricting a prime minister to serving a maximum of two terms of office
- Preventing a government from acting as a caretaker administration after dissolving Parliament.
- Making it easier to launch a no-confidence debate against the Prime Minister. Whereas the 1997 Constitution required 200 out of the House's 500 MPs to launch a no-confidence debate against the Prime Minister, Sonthi demanded that 100 MPs be sufficient.

He also made several suggestions, including:

- Transforming the Senate, from an all-elected body to one with 50% appointed members, to prevent relatives of politicians from being elected and thus perverting the non-partisan intent of the 1997 Constitution.
- Allowing politicians to switch political parties at any time. The 1997 Constitution required that any candidate for the House belong to a political party for 90 days before the registration date for an election.
- Banning the merger of political parties.

Sonthi later denied dictating the content for the new constitution, but stated "We can't force them to do things but responsible people will know what the constitution should look like."

He also suggested that the term in office of village heads and kamnan be increased from 5 years to 10 years, while the role of elected tambon administrative organisations be reduced.

== Relations with Singapore ==
In 2006, Thaksin Shinawatra sold his shares in telecom firm Shin Corp to Temasek Holdings. The sale also transferred control of Shin Corp's five satellites (including IPSTAR, the world's largest commercial satellite) and mobile phone operator to the Singaporean company. After the coup, Sonthi claimed that Singapore was eavesdropping on confidential mobile telephone calls made by junta leaders. AIS and Shin Satellite, Shin Corp's mobile operator and satellite operator, denied the claim. In February 2007, Sonthi vowed in front of a thousand volunteer territorial defence students to reclaim the satellites and other telecom assets. "Soldiers will not tolerate a loss of territory, not even a square inch," he said, and continued about how it was his specific duty to "retrieve our assets". Sonthi stopped short of threatening to nationalise the telecommunications conglomerate. An opinion poll found more than 78 percent of 1,116 Thais surveyed backed Sonthi's bid to somehow reclaim the satellites.

Sonthi's deputy in the CNS, General Saprang Kalayanamitr, noted in a February interview that, "if the telecommunication business is in private hands, it won't be safe for the country."

== Human rights ==
Human Rights Watch accused the Thai Army, under Sonthi's command, of "disappearing" ethnic Malay Muslims in the far south in a deliberate attempt to defeat the South Thailand insurgency. "These 'disappearances' appear to be a matter of policy, not simply the work of rogue elements in the security services," said the agency in a report.

== Other controversies ==
Sonthi approved a 12 million baht top-secret budget for a public relations campaign to discredit Thaksin Shinawatra. The request for the money was submitted on 24 January 2007. Chianchuang Kalayanamitr, younger brother of CNS Deputy Secretary-General Saprang Kalayanamitr, was hired as head of the publicity team. Politicians hired as part of the CNS campaign included Chat Pattana party leader Korn Dabbaransi, Democrats Korn Chatikavanij, and Korbsak Sabavasu, Prapat Panya-chatraksa, a key Thai Rak Thai member who defected to the Chat Thai party, plus ex-senator Kraisak Choonhavan. Academics hired by the CNS included Wuttipong Piebjriya-wat, Sophon Supapong, Narong Phet-prasert, and Somkiat Osotspa. However, Sophon denied he had anything to do with the campaign.

After a bomb was exploded outside of Chitralada Palace in early May 2007, junta leader Sonthi Boonyaratglin claimed that the "old power group" was behind it, and told the press to ask PTV to learn more. He did not cite any evidence for his claims.

Sonthi claimed in public that several upper-middle-ranking public officials had attempted to give him between 40 and 100 million baht in order to get promoted to director-general posts. Sonthi noted that the incidents led him to conclude that paying bribes to get promoted was common during the deposed government of Thaksin Shinawatra. A criminal complaint was filed against Sonthi for failing to take action against the officials. "Sonthi knows who the people are. Why hasn't he charged them over their illegal actions?" said PTV executive Veera Musigapong.

Amid escalating public criticism of Premier Surayud in March 2007, Chaiwat Sinsuwong, leader of a PAD branch called the Assembly of Isaan People, personally met Sonthi to request that the military remove the Prime Minister. Afterwards, Chaiwat claimed that Sonthi listened to him attentively and promised to consider his request. Sonthi later claimed that he was tricked into receiving Chaiwat, and had no intention to endorse the anti-government activists.

In May 2007, Sonthi warned about 40 senior newspaper columnists and executives to "report news correctly," saying that he had noticed columnists criticising situations in different ways, and making it clear that he wanted stories to be reported in the same direction.

On 30 May 2007, a junta-appointed Constitutional Tribunal dissolved the Thai Rak Thai Party and banned over 100 of its executives, including Thaksin, from politics for 5 years. On the morning of the ruling, Sonthi met with Tribunal judge Ackaratorn Chularat. He later denied that he lobbied the Constitution Tribunal to ban the Thai Rak Thai executive team.

== Resignation from CNS, entry into politics ==
There was widespread public speculation that Sonthi would retain power after his mandatory retirement in 2007. Although he promised not to follow in the footsteps of former National Peace Keeping Coalition leader and deposed prime minister General Suchinda Kraprayoon, Sonthi did note that he alone could not make the decision as to whether he should become prime minister.

In March 2007, Sonthi called for emergency rule to be declared in Bangkok in response to the protests by the founders of PTV. In an interview, he noted that the protests had so far been peaceful, but that he was afraid the movement could lead to "mutiny and chaos in the country."

As the military junta consolidated its power, Sonthi flip-flopped from earlier promises not to cling to power. In a television interview on 25 June 2007 he hinted at plans to enter politics after he retires as Army chief in September 2007, not denying a suggestion that a new political party might be created for him. The very next day, a group of allies and anti-Thaksin politicians launched Ruam Jai Thai (Thai Unity), a new party that "would not be unfriendly to the military", as one put it.

Sonthi's potential entry into politics was welcomed by Suthep Thaugsuban, Secretary-General of the Democrat Party. "It would be a good sign if Sonthi would turn himself into a politician because that is the way of democracy. We should appreciate him [if he did it that way]. He is welcome... I haven't talked about the matter with him. But, in general, the Army commander-in-chief, government officials or ordinary people are welcome here at the Democrat Party," Suthep said.

Coup-supporter Suriyasai Katasila of the People's Alliance for Democracy suggested that Sonthi skip the next post-election and wait for the one after it, if he is keen about entering politics. Fellow coup-supporter Chamlong Srimuang, whose 1992 protests against Prime Minister Suchinda Kraprayoon led to the coup-leader's downfall, declined to state his views on Sonthi's future political role. CNS sources claimed that as of July 2007, Sonthi had not made a decision about whether or not to run in the next election.

The Prime Minister's Office Minister defended Sonthi's right to formally enter politics. "Whether or not it is appropriate for him to contest the [next] general election is open to criticism, which, of course, has nothing to do with his right to run. If people consider it inappropriate, they will not vote for him or his party," the Minister said.

In the months prior to July 2007, Sonthi co-chaired meetings of the Thai Cabinet, alongside Prime Minister Surayud Chulanont. He also travelled to the provinces to convince local officials to cut links with Thaksin Shinawatra and anti-junta politicians, telling them they would be treated better under his rule. Sources claimed that Sonthi was planning to run for Parliament in the next election, representing Lopburi. General Pallop Pinmanee, Sonthi's advisor and director of the Internal Security Operations Command (ISOC) was charged with building a support base for Gen Sonthi in Lopburi. ISOC staff were also sent to Northern and Northeastern provinces, political strongholds of Thaksin's Thai Rak Thai party, to persuade local politicians to defect from Thai Rak Thai and join political parties backed by the military.

Sonthi resigned as commander-in-chief of the Royal Thai Army on 30 September 2007. He was succeeded by General Anupong Paochinda. Sonthi resigned as chairman of the Council for National Security on 1 October 2007. He was succeeded as CNS chairman by Air Chief Marshal Chalit Pukbhasuk, the commander-in-chief of the Royal Thai Air Force. Sonthi accepted a post in the cabinet of Prime Minister Surayud Chulanont as deputy prime minister in charge of security.

== Personal life ==
Sonthi has two concurrent wives. He registered to marry his first wife, Sukanya, when he was a lieutenant and registered to a second wife, Piyada, when he was a captain. He currently lives with both women. Bigamy is illegal in Thailand, and is punishable with a jail term. However, Interior Minister Aree Wongsaraya defended Sonthi, claiming that it was a personal matter. He boasted that he himself had six wives.

Sonthi is Shia Muslim and of partial Persian lineage. His ancestor, Sheikh Ahmad Qomi, was an Iranian expatriate trader who lived in Thailand for 26 years. Many Thais, including those from the Bunnag and Ahmadchula families trace their ancestry back to him. In addition, he was also of Mon descent from his mother.

== Royal decorations ==
Sonthi has received the following royal decorations in the Honours System of Thailand:

- Knight Grand Cordon (Special Class) of the Most Exalted Order of the White Elephant
- Knight Grand Cordon (Special Class) of the Most Noble Order of the Crown of Thailand
- Victory Medal - Vietnam War with flames
- Freeman Safeguarding Medal
- Border Service Medal
- Chakra Mala Medal

=== Foreign decorations ===
- USA :
  - Army Commendation Medal with "V" device (1970)
- South Vietnam :
  - Gallantry Cross with palm (1971)
  - Vietnam Campaign Medal (1970)
- Malaysia :
  - Courageous Commander of The Most Gallant Order of Military Service (P.G.A.T.) (2007)
- Singapore :
  - Pingat Jasa Gemilang (Tentera) (2007)

== Quotes ==
- "There is nobody who wants to stage a coup. I can assure that the military will not." 28 February 2006
- "The army will not get involved in the political conflict. Political troubles should be resolved by politicians. Military coups are a thing of the past.", 6 March 2006,
- "Nobody was behind us. We decided on our own, and we took care of it on our own ... because the people have called for it and also because of the mismanagement of the government.", 20 September 2006
- "Thaksin is a Thai and a fellow countryman and there will be no problem should he decide to return. We are like brothers.", 20 September 2006

Military offices
Preceded by Prawit Wongsuwan	Commander-in-Chief of the Royal Thai Army; 2005–2007	Succeeded by Anupong Paochinda
Preceded by New title	Chairman of the Council for National Security; 2006–2007	Succeeded by Chalit Pukbhasuk; Acting
Political offices
Preceded by Thaksin Shinawatra as Prime Minister of Thailand	President of the Administrative Reform Council of Thailand; 2006	Succeeded by Surayud Chulanont as Prime Minister of Thailand
