= PTV (Thailand) =

Thai satellite television station

People's Television (PTV) was a Thai satellite television station. It was established by former executives of the Thai Rak Thai party after the 2006 Thailand military coup overthrew the Thai Rak Thai-led government. It launched despite warnings from the Council for National Security, the military junta that seized power. PTV executives insisted that if ASTV (a satellite television station run by anti-Thai Rak Thai activist and media tycoon Sondhi Limthongkul) could operate, then so could PTV.

PTV's inaugural broadcast on 1 March 2007 was stopped because of CAT Telecom's refusal to grant an internet link from Bangkok to a satellite up-link station in Hong Kong. CAT Telecom claimed that it never received PTV's application for internet access. PTV executives claimed that CAT Chairman and junta leader Saprang Kalayanamitr was preventing it from broadcasting for political reasons.

PTV executives led several public protests against the junta's censorship. In a demonstration on 23 March 2007 attended by 1,500-3,000 protestors, thousands of police in riot gear attempted to disperse the protest. The protests caused the junta to request that the government declare emergency rule in Bangkok.

PTV was controversially shut down by Prime Minister Abhisit Vejjajiva in the early days of the 2010 Thailand political protests.

== Leadership and vision ==
The new television station was led by former Thai Rak Thai Party executives Veera Musikapong, Jatuporn Prompan, and Nattawut Saikua, as well as former government spokesman Jakrapob Penkair. Veera denied that any funding for the station came from former Thai Rak Thai party leader Thaksin Shinawatra. Thaksin lawyer, Noppadon Pattama, likewise denied any involvement between Thaksin and PTV.

Veera claimed that PTV aimed to serve the public by acting like "a small candle shedding the light of truth." He added that "In the past, the channels of communication that served the nation were limited, and we saw no hope for the future. If a station that helps people constructively exchange views exists, it will help the country maintain its democracy." After the 2006 Thailand coup, all other Thai television stations were censored and forbidden from reporting on the activities of Thaksin. Foreign broadcasts by BBC and CNN were also censored.

PTV is operated by Peuan Pong Nong Phi (Thai: เพื่อนพ้องน้องพี่) Co. Ltd. Peuan Pong Nong Phi was founded in 2002 by students from Ramkhamhaeng University. It originally produced print media and was established with registered capital of 5 million baht. Prior to commencing broadcasting, its registered capital was increased to 50 million baht, most of the capital coming from the new management. Jatuporn Promphan claimed that further capital would be raised from the public.

== Legal status and controversies ==
Both PTV and ASTV transmitted their programs via satellite from earth stations outside of Thailand to cable TV operators inside the kingdom. Both stations claimed that this practice allowed them to run on cable television without being subjected to the government's broadcast regulatory bodies.

Minister to the Prime Minister's Office Thirapat Serirangsan ordered the Director-General of the Public Relations Department to press legal charges against PTV. He insisted that no double standards were being applied. "If PTV insists on going on the air, the director-general of the Public Relations Department, as the officer in charge, will have to take legal action, just as ASTV has also been legally pursued since the last government," said Thirapat, referring to ASTV's pending court injunction. Thai Day Dot Com Co, the operator of ASTV, filed a criminal lawsuit against the Public Relations Department, alleging that it abused its powers when questioning ASTV's legal status. During the last days of the Thaksin government, the Administrative Court granted ASTV's request for an injunction to stop authorities from taking it off the air while the court is considering its petition.

Station executive Veera claimed that Article 3 of the junta's interim constitution guaranteed the right to engage in broadcasting all activities in accordance with the law.

Former opposition and Democrat Party leader Abhisit Vejjajiva advised the junta to ensure equal treatment for both PTV and ASTV.

PTV newsmen were refused press passes to Government House on grounds they had not yet accredited.

Defence Minister Boonrawd Somtas claimed that the station received financial support from an "old power clique." PTV executives consistently denied they have direct links or received funding from ousted prime minister Thaksin Shinawatra or his Thai Rak Thai Party. PTV executives sued the Defence Minister for defamation. The executives also planned to file a civil case against General Boonrawd for 50 million baht.

After a bomb was exploded outside of Chitrlada Palace in early May 2007, junta leader Sonthi Boonratkalin claimed that the "old power group" was behind it, and told the press to ask PTV to learn more.

== Protests ==
Station executives held several demonstrations in Sanam Luang to protest the junta's ban against the station's broadcasts. In one demonstration, 1,800 police in riot-gear surrounded approximately 1,500-3,000 protestors and attempted to dismantle PTV's protest stage. The operation was an implementation of security operation plan Pathaphi 149, which was designed to protect the army from public rallies. However, the police backed off after the protesters threw plastic bottles and yelled at them. PTV executives asked the demonstrators not to attack the police. Station executives vowed to stage weekly Friday rallies. Junta chief Sonthi Boonyaratkalin vowed to prosecute any former Thai Rak Thai leaders if they provided financial support for the rallies.

Junta chief Sonthi Boonyaratkalin requested Prime Minister Surayud Chulanont to declare an emergency in Bangkok on 28 March 2007 in response to the protests. In an interview, he noted that the protests had so far been peaceful, but that he was afraid the movement could lead to "mutiny and chaos in the country." CNS Spokesman Sansern Kaewkamnerd asked, "What will we do if the numbers of protesters go beyond 100,000? It will greatly damage the country's image." Emergency powers allowed the government to ban public gatherings, impose curfews and censor local news reports. Surayud did not comply with the request.

A PTV rally in Bangkok City Hall's Lan Khon Muang grounds on 30 March 2007 was attended by 4,000 people. The rally proceeded under tight security. The Bangkok city government positioned more than 10 municipal garbage trucks full of rotting refuse next to the protest area.

Follow-on protests were planned for Sunday 7 April 2007. Defence Minister Boonrawd Somtas warned that the military would not tolerate protests against the junta, and that "whoever tries to cause trouble in the country is nothing else but a traitor," adding that the PTV protesters intended to undermine harmony in the country.

Junta leaders threatened a third time to declare a state of emergency due to PTV's planned protests on 27 April 2007.

Protests organized by PTV and attended by PTV's executives escalated. In July 2007, Veera Musikapong led thousands of protestors in a demonstration outside the house of Privy Councilor Prem Tinsulanonda, claiming that he was behind the 2006 coup and the military junta. The government impeded the protests and cracked down on the protestors, wounding many. Several protestors were arrested, including Veera, an interim National Human Rights Commissioner, and a former Chief Justice of the Criminal Court. Afterwards, junta chief Sonthi Boonyaratklin visited Prem to apologize for the protests on behalf of the government. One day later, Prime Minister Surayud Chulanont, along with 34 members of his Cabinet, went to Prem's house to apologize to Prem for "apologize for failing to take good care of him." Surayud accused the protesters of trying to "bring down the highest institution of the country."
