= Public opinion of the 2006 Thai coup d'état =

Public opinion of the 2006 Thailand coup d'état was diverse. An initial public opinion poll showed support for the coup, although the junta banned subsequent polls. Bangkok residents displayed kindness to soldiers who had seized control of key positions. The response of activists and academics was mixed, and ranged from support for the junta to harsh condemnations. Several public protests against the coup were organized, despite junta ban on demonstrations. In subsequent weeks, condemnation of the coup transformed into criticism of the junta-appointed government of Surayud Chulanont.

== Public opinion poll ==
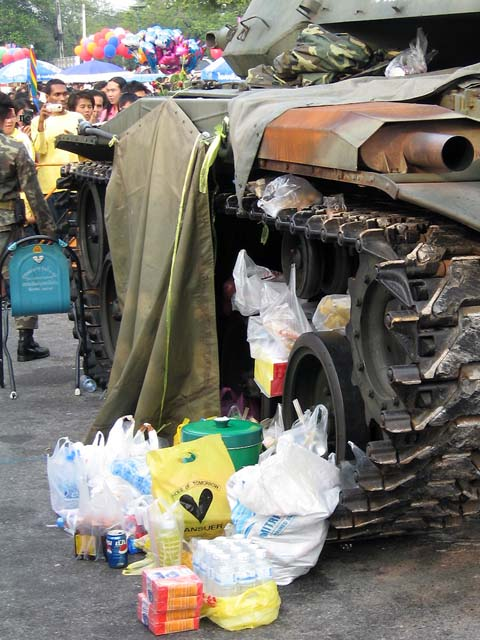
Food given by supporters of the coup stacking up near an armoured vehicle. "Party atmosphere" in the background.

On Wednesday, 20 September 2006, Suan Dusit Rajabhat University published the result of a poll of 2,019 people. The results were that 84 percent supported the coup d'état, and 75 percent believed the coup would "improve politics". Only 5 percent believe it will make politics worse. This should be contrasted with a nationwide poll taken in July that found that 49 people of the people would vote for Thaksin's party in the cancelled October election. Starting Thursday, 21 September, the junta ordered the media to stop publicizing the results of public opinion against the coup.

== Support for the coup ==
=== Student support of the coup ===
Many of the students at the country's prestigious Chulalongkorn University were of the same mind the day after the coup. "It may have been an authoritarian, unconstitutional and undemocratic move, but Thailand will emerge stronger out of this and its democratic institutions will strengthen in the long run," said Wipat, an economics student

The Nation noted that local reaction was largely subdued. Although the Bangkok middle class was gladdened by the coup, Thaksin's rural supporters lacked real leaders to register strong voices of dissent.

=== Public kindness to soldiers ===
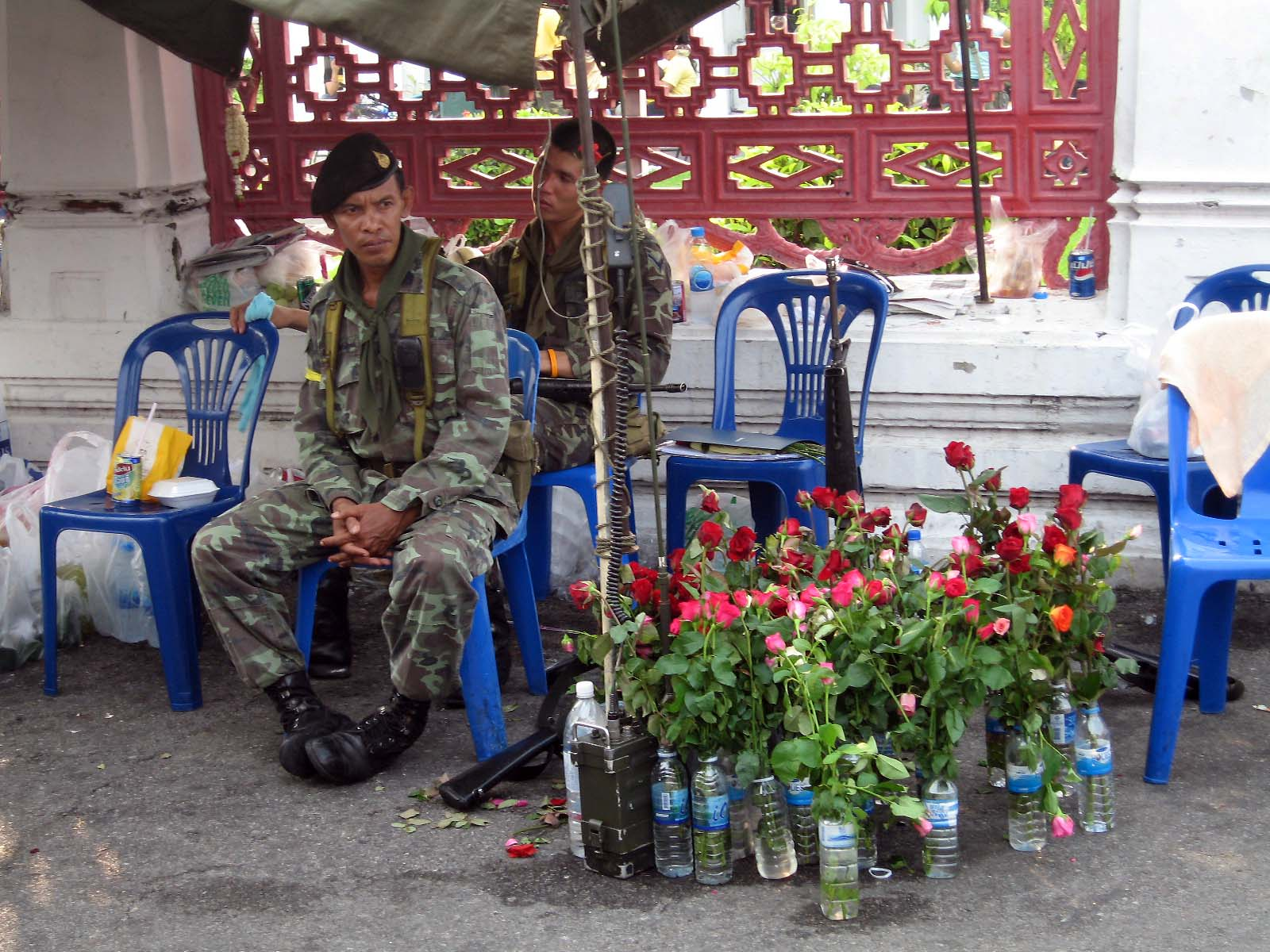
Soldiers watching over bunch of roses given by supporters

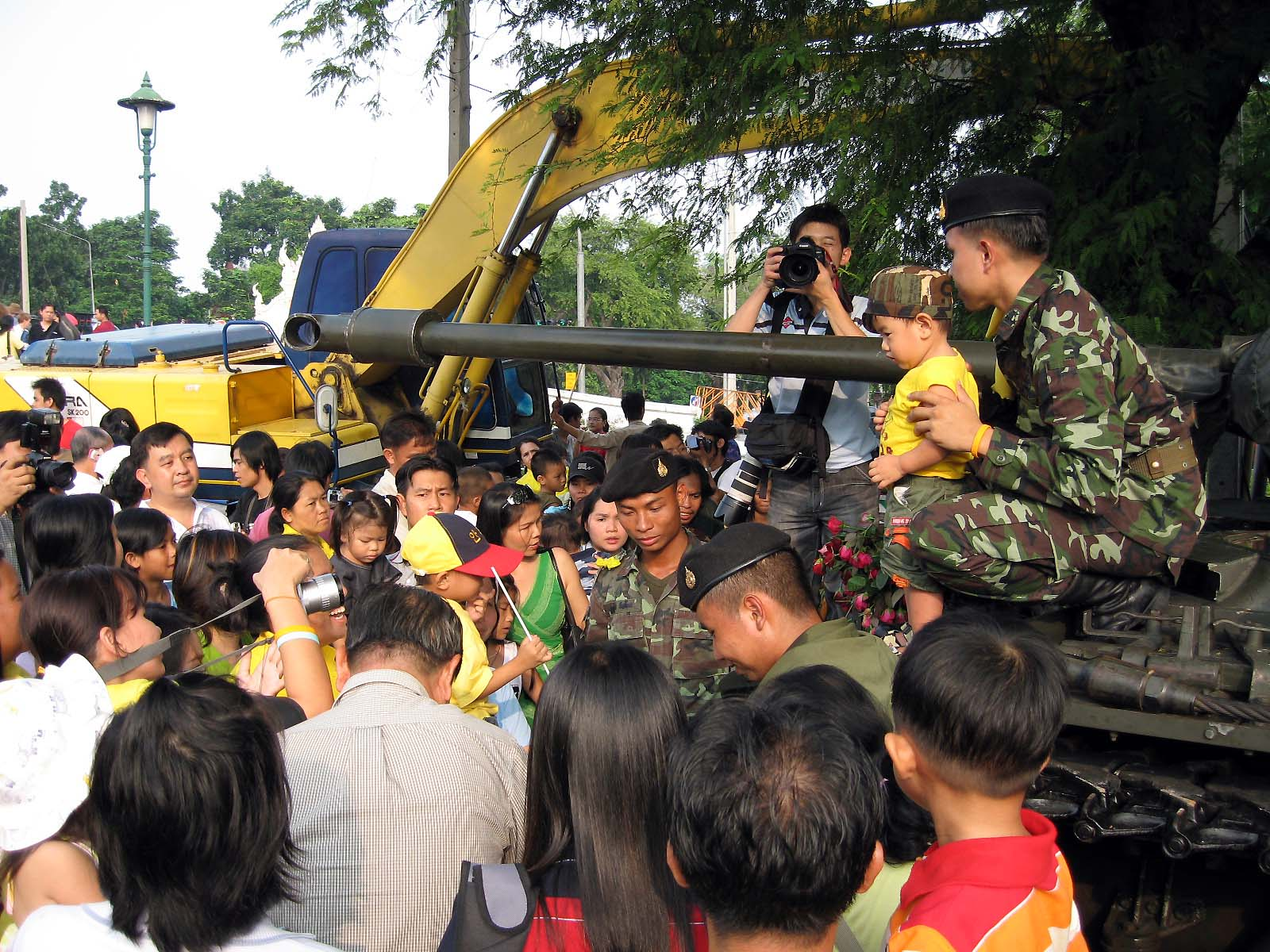
People waiting to have picture of their children taken with a soldier.

In the days following the coup, many Thai people in Bangkok and surrounding area supported the soldiers in their positions by bringing food, drinks, and flowers. In the following days, the presence of M-41/A tanks became an attraction for Thai adults and children as well as foreign tourists queuing up to take photos. At the Royal Plaza, a particularly big crowd turned the place into a temple fair with food vendors. Some schools have taken students on tours of the area

Soldiers were heartened by warm public response. A soldier who agreed with the coup although he said it wasn't democratic said "I talked to people protesting against Thaksin Shinawatra who said they could do anything and would sacrifice their lives. If that happened—and officers had to suppress the chaos—the loss would be greater". He added "We have our own democracy. We are all under His Majesty the King and people still have faith in the monarch. The military has a duty to protect the country, the religion and the King"

=== Support from academia ===
On Friday, a group of lecturers and students from Rajamangala University of Technology Phra Nakhon rallied briefly in front of the Army head office to call on their counterparts from Chulalongkorn and Thammasat universities not to be opposed to the coup leaders.

=== Political support ===
Former Senator Kraisak Choonhavan praised the coup, saying "This is the first coup where I don't have to watch my back. All day Wednesday I gave interviews to Western media [who asked], what about democracy? So I would begin by telling about four years of human rights violations, abuse of power and uncaring of Parliamentary processes. I was amazed the lengthy explanation fell on deaf ears." Thailand's last coup in 1991 had deposed, arrested, and seized the assets of Kraisak's father, former Premier Chatichai Choonhavan.

=== Support from activists ===
The Campaign for Popular Democracy, which coordinates 32 civic groups, 6 universities and 169 NGOs, came out in support of the coup. CPD Secretary-General and People's Alliance for Democracy spokesperson Suriyasai Katasila blamed the deposed government, stating "Thaksin was wrong to stay on and lead the country into a political deadlock. It resulted in military action."

=== Support from overseas Thais ===
Several Thai people in New York City demonstrated outside the UN showing support for the coup.

== Disapproval and protest against the coup ==
=== Disapproval from public figures ===
Anand Panyarachun, one of Thailand's most respected intellectuals, head of drafting committee of the 1997 Constitution, and former coup-installed Prime Minister, noted his criticism of the coup in an interview with the Far Eastern Economic Review (italics added):

You have to remember that since 1992, we have had four general elections; we had peaceful transfers of power; we had governments who served full four-year terms. The military in 1992 had gone back to the barracks, and up to a few months ago there were no speculations and rumors about a possible coup. The armed forces, particularly the army, had gone back to the barracks and had become real professional soldiers. So to me what happened must be considered to be an extremely unfortunate dead-end street. So let's hope that there will be a new civilian government, fully engaged in some of the reform measures, including the revision of the present Constitution. I'm pretty confident that things will be normal in a few weeks' time. If you ask the purists and the theorists, they will say this is a setback of democracy, but I think you make two forward steps, and retreat one step, and then you catch up with the step that you loose, and then the future steps will become even faster. When you talk about democracy, it's not that every country has to emulate American democracy or Western-style democracy or presidential democracy. I'm sure that many countries in Europe would be appalled if they were to have an American model of democracy imposed on them. So it has to be homegrown. So you respect the democratic values, you respect and practice democratic principles, but you don't put too much emphasis just on elections or elected bodies or executive or judiciary. But you also have to make sure that in that process the society needs to be opened up, to permit full use of transparency, and accountability, and independent judiciary, and above all, freedom of the media, let alone the accountability mechanisms.

Pasuk Pongpaijitr, a prominent anti-Thaksin academic, noted

The problems over Thaksin had to be addressed, but I don't like the way it happened. It took a lot of time and effort to make the last constitution, and that's just been thrown in the wastepaper bin. If the prime minister has done something wrong, I'd rather see him tried legally in the courts than be overthrown like this. In 1991 [following Thailand's previous coup], the military wanted to come back to power and replace the elected government. There will be huge pressure to stop them doing that this time round."

Nobel Prize laureate Wole Soyinka cancelled his keynote speech for the annual S.E.A. Write Awards Ceremony at the Oriental Hotel in protest against the coup.

=== Disapproval from students ===
The vice president of the Thammasat University Student Union stated on 20 September that it is holding talks with representatives of student unions from other universities in order to prepare a response. A unified response was not made.

The Political Satire Group of Thammasat University erected a large sign at Rangsit Center protesting the coup.

A student group, the "News Center for Student Activities" also issued a statement condemning the coup, saying it was "anti-democratic and truly dictatorial". The group urged the Thai people to wear black to mourn the death of Thai democracy and to refrain from co-operating with the "military junta".

=== Protests against the coup ===
Reports on the numbers, extent and nature of public demonstrations against the coup and the military government are often contingent on national media whose freedom of speech is limited by the censure imposed by the CDR.

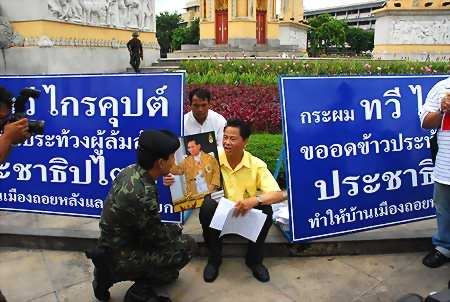
Hunger striker Thawee Kraikup before his arrest

Organised local opposition to the coup was muted, due to a military ban against protests. International protests against the coup were scattered, with a group of anti-coup demonstrators claiming to have protested in front of the Thai Consulate in New York City.

==== First public protest at Democracy Monument ====
Activist Chalard Worachat and former MP Thawee Kraikup held a protest against the junta at the Democracy Monument. Thawee held up a sign saying "Fasting in Protest Against the Destroyer of Democracy." Military forces arrived soon afterwards and arrested Chalard at 12.30. Thawee refused to end his protest and was arrested 3 hours later. Thawee actively resisted arrest.

A group calling itself the "19 September Network against Coup d'Etat" organized a petition signing at 18.00 on Friday 22 September 2006 at the Siam Paragon shopping center in Bangkok. The Network was joined by the Student Activity Information Resource (SAIR). A SAIR organizer claimed that he had submitted a petition at the office of the National Human Rights Commission, urging it to protect their right to gather at Siam Paragon.

==== Siam Center, 22 September 2006 ====
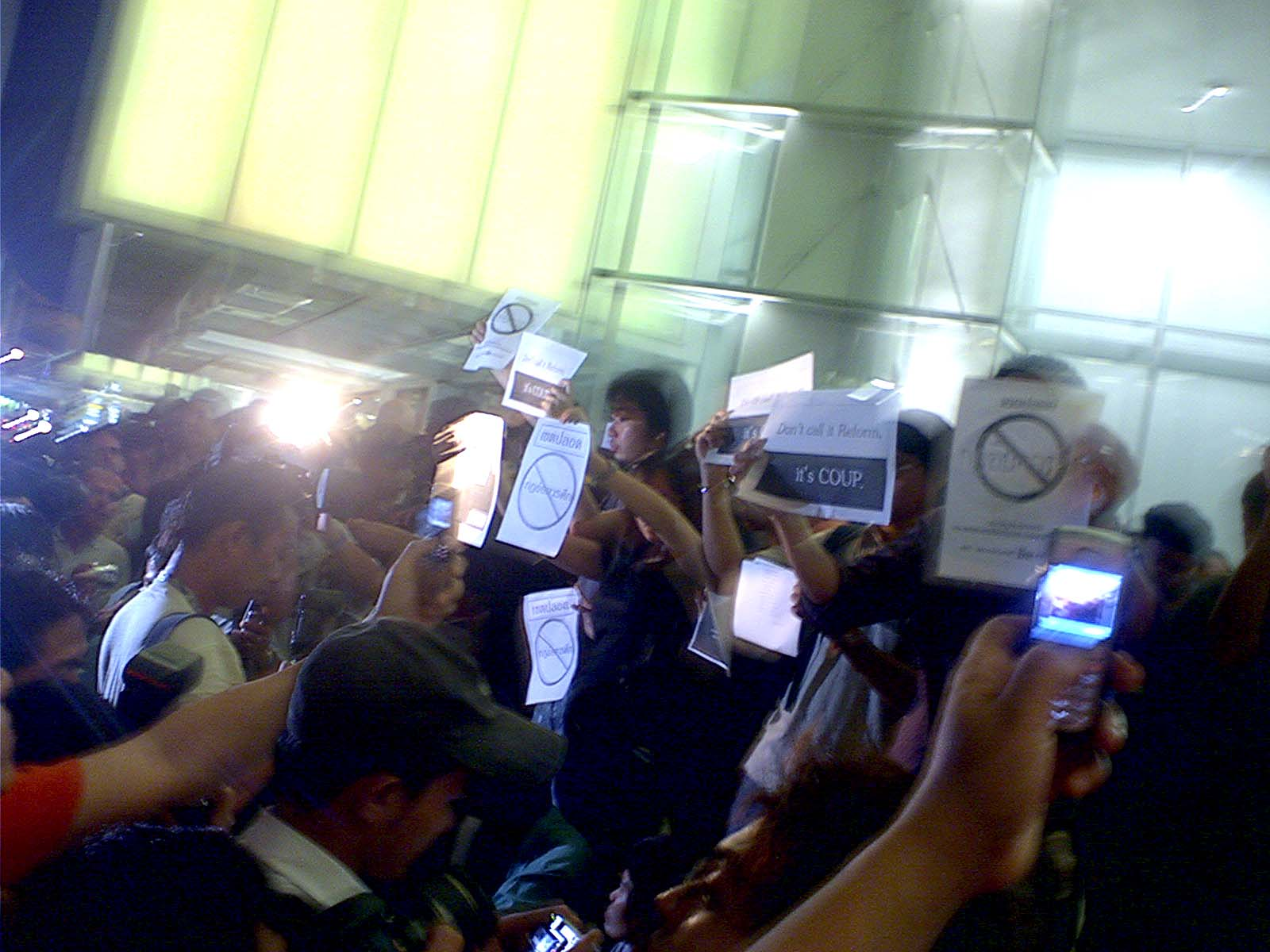
A group of protesters at Siam Square, 22 Sep. 2006

The first public protest after the coup attracted between 20 and 100 protesters, depending on the source. It occurred in front of Siam Center on the evening of Friday 22 September 2006. Nobody was arrested but a deputy commander said: "police had recorded the protest on video and would examine the tape to see if protesters had broken martial law forbidding an assembly of more than five people for political purposes." It is unknown whether the police or junta will later arrest those it has recorded breaking martial law on video. Demonstrators wore black to mourn the death of democracy, and urged people who opposed the coup to also wear black in protest. Signs included "No to Thaksin. No to coup" and "Don't call it reform - it's a coup". One poster depicted the Democracy Monument with the caption "On vacation again". Among the protesters was political scientist Giles Ungphakorn who noted, "We believe we speak for a significant number of Thais who are too worried or too afraid to speak." The protest was not reported on Thai television channels. The Independent reported that when the first protester, a female student, began reading out a statement, armed police forced their way through the crowd and grabbed her. The newspaper also reported that a police officer jabbed a gun into her stomach and told her: "You're coming with us." The protesters tried to hold the woman back, but her fate is unknown.

==== Thammasat University, 25 September 2006 ====
The second public protest against the coup occurred on Monday 25 September 2006 attracted between 50 and 60 protesters. It was held at 5pm at Thammasat University. The protest included a political discussion on "Why we must resist the coup", and was organized by the "Dome Daeng (Red Dome)" group of Thammasat University, the "Chula Students for Liberty" group, and students from Mahidol, Ramkhamhaeng and Kasetsart universities and King Mongkut's Institute of Technology. "If they [the military] arrest or harm us, we won't fight back, but it will show that their talk about political reform is not for real," said Uchaen Cheangsane, an organizer of the "Dome Daeng" group. "The choice in our world is not just between Thaksin or tanks," said Arunwana Sanitkawathee, a Thammasat journalism student who attended the protest. The one-hour rally featured a banner mocking the "Council of Demented and Ridiculous Military"; there was no presence of uniformed police officials.

==== Chulalongkorn University, 27 September 2006 ====
A protest cum political discussion at Chulalongkorn University attracted about 100 people. Speakers included Giles Ungphakorn, Prapas Pintobtaeng, and Sirote Klampaiboon. During the protest, Prapas told the audience that villagers in Pak Mool of Ubon Ratchathani province had recently been raided by the military looking for evidence that the villagers (who had previously protested regarding the environment) had received support from the Thai Rak Thai party. Giles criticized supporters of the coup, noting that "Those academics who are fake libertarians and fake democrats are telling students they must accept the legitimacy of dictators because we have no other choice. But dictatorship cannot give birth to democracy." Pattawit Thambutdee, a political science student at Chulalongkorn compared the coup to an act of burning a flower garden to remove the weeds. "Nobody can guarantee that this will be the last [coup], and it will be hard to grow the garden back again," said Pattawit. The group vowed to stage more discussions and protests.

==== Democracy Monument, 14 October 2006 ====
On 14 October 2006, the 33rd anniversary of the mass movement that rejected the military government of Thanom Kittikachorn, 300 protesters marched along Rajdamnoen Avenue from Thammasat University to Democracy Monument. Marchers ranged in age from toddlers to some around 70 years of age. The protesters held a candle-lit vigil when they arrived at Democracy Monument.

==== Other protests ====
Four law lecturers at Thammasat University issued a statement condemning the coup makers for "disrespecting the will of the people". The groups, led by well-known law lecturer Vorajaet Phakeerat, added that the forced nullification of the 1997 People's Constitution also destroyed the social contract and was "unacceptable".

==== Public petitions against the coup ====
An active online petition organized by Thongchai Winichakul, of the University of Wisconsin–Madison, was also set up at the PetitionOnline website to urge the junta not to arrest or harm protesters. Many people of influence have signed the petition so far, including Giles Ungphakorn and Chalong Soontravanich of Chulalongkorn University, Kasian Tejapira of Thammasat University, Viroj Na Ranong of the TDRI, and Duncan McCargo of the University of Leeds.

== See also ==
- Constitution of Thailand
- 1973 Thai popular uprising
- 1976 Thammasat University massacre
- 2005–06 Thai political crisis
- 2006 Thai coup d'état
- 2008–10 Thai political crisis
- April 2009 Thai political unrest
- 2013 Thai protests
- 2013 Egyptian coup d'état
