= 2006 interim constitution of Thailand =

Fundamental law of Thailand from 2006 to 2007

The Constitution of the Kingdom of Thailand (Interim), Buddhist Era 2549 (2006) (Thai: รัฐธรรมนูญแห่งราชอาณาจักรไทย (ฉบับชั่วคราว) พุทธศักราช 2549; RTGS: Ratthathammanun Haeng Ratcha-anachak Thai (Chabap Chua Khrao) Phutthasakkarat Song Phan Ha Roi Si Sip Kao) was an interim constitution of Thailand enacted to replace the 1997 Constitution which was repealed by the Council for Democratic Reform (CDR) after it seized power from the government of Thaksin Shinawatra in the 2006 Thailand coup. Released on 27 September 2006 and promulgated on 1 October 2006, the Constitution allowed the junta to retain significant control over the appointed civilian government and the drafting of a permanent constitution. The CDR would be transformed into a permanent Council for National Security (CNS) and would appoint the head of the executive branch, the entire legislature, and the drafters of a permanent constitution. The Constitution made no mention of succession, instead leaving it to "constitutional practice." The draft came under strong public criticism as being a step backwards from the 1997 "People's Constitution". The constitution did not repeal junta bans restricting freedom of speech, assembly, and political activity; these bans were subsequently revoked by an act on 27 December 2006.

This interim constitution was replaced by the 2007 Constitution on 24 August 2007.

== Drafting process ==
The junta appointed a legal panel to draft an interim charter. The team was led by former Senate speaker Meechai Ruchuphan, and originally included jurists Borwornsak Uwanno and Wissanu Krea-ngam. Both had played key roles in drafting the 1997 Constitution and had served under the deposed government, although they had resigned several months before the coup. Both resigned from the panel after public criticism that they were members of the ancien regime. Thammasat vice-rector Prinya Thewanaruemitkul harshly criticized the two, saying that they were "not honourable enough to look after the democratic system." Both refused to play any further role with the military junta. After the draft charter was promulgated, Meechai resigned as chief drafter; the junta appointed Jaran Pakdithanakul, former secretary to the Supreme Court president, as his replacement.

== Key features ==
The draft interim charter had 39 articles. Structurally, the draft interim charter was similar to the 1991 Constitution, the 1976 Constitution, and the 1959 Charter, in that it stipulated an extremely powerful executive branch which would appoint the entire legislature. The charter:

- prescribes for the constitutional monarchy and the Kingdom of Thailand as the singular state (Art. 1)
- guarantees basic rights, human dignity and equality under the law in accordance with the democratic rule under the king as head of state and international obligations (Art. 3)
- outlines the formation and duties of the National Legislative Assembly, which will comprise 250 members appointed from professional groups, geographical areas and various sectors of society (Art. 5)
- allows the National Legislative Assembly to request the Cabinet to give statements of fact or explain problems, but explicitly states that it may not make a vote of confidence or no confidence against the Cabinet (Art. 11)
- grants immunity for remarks made on the floor (Art.13)
- allows the Chairman of the Council for National Security (the junta) to remove the Prime Minister (Art. 14)
- guarantees the independence of the judiciary (Art. 18)
- spells out a process for drafting a permanent constitution. This includes the prohibition of the 100 members of the Constitution Drafting Council from being current members of a political party or being members of a political party for the previous 2 years (Art. 19)
- empowers the Legislative Assembly speaker to chair the National Assembly (Art. 20)
- spells out the peer-vote of a 2,000 member National Assembly to elect 200 candidates for the Constitutional Drafting Council. Each member can vote fore no more than three members, those nominated with the most votes will win. In the case of tied votes, which result in more than 200 winners, the winners will be decided by drawing lots. The peer-vote must complete in seven days (Art. 22).
- empowers the Council of National Security to pick 100 of 200 CDC candidates for royal approval (Art. 22).
- empowers the Council of National Security to appoint a 100-member CDC if the National Assembly fails to complete its selection within 7 days (Art. 23)
- empowers the 100 CDC members to appoint 25 members of a Drafting Committee who may not be CDC members. The CNS will appoint another 10 members. (Art. 25)
- forces the Drafting Committee to explain the differences between its draft and the 1997 Constitution. Forces the committee to present drafts to major state agencies and universities. Forces the committee to promote and hold public hearings (Art. 26).
- allows half the members of the National Assembly to submit amendments to the constitution (Art. 27)
- gives the Drafting Committee 30 days to compile feedback and amendments and compile a report stating why such amendments were accepted or rejected. The report will be presented to the CDC for review along with the constitution for approval. Further amendments require a vote of 3/5's the membership of the CDC (Art. 28)
- sets the 180-day deadline to complete the charter drafting before organising the referendum on the new charter within 30 days. The referendum will be managed by the CDC (Art. 29)
- sets the 45-day deadline for the drafting of organic laws and bans the chairman of the Council of National Security, members of the National Legislative Assembly and those involved in charter writing from contesting the general election and the senatorial race for two years (Art. 30)
- allows the National Assembly and Cabinet, chaired by the CNS Chairman, to select any previous constitution revise it for use if the Drafting Committee's draft is not approved by public referendum or the CDC does not approve the constitution (Art. 32)
- endorses CDR announcement no. 24 creating the 16 member Council for National Security with an identical leadership to the CDR (Art. 34)
- transfers the authority and jurisdiction of the Constitutional Court (under the 1997 Constitution) to a Constitutional Tribunal, chaired by the Supreme Court President, with the Supreme Administrative Court President as deputy chairman, as well as five Supreme Court judges to be selected by a general assembly of the Supreme Court through a secret ballot. All cases pending of the Constitutional Court are transferred to the Constitutional Tribunal (Art. 35)
- endorses all previous announcements and orders of the CDR (Art. 36)
- grants complete immunity for all actions to seize power committed by the CDRM (Art.37).
- empowers the chairman of the Council of National Security to administer the country pending the appointment of a prime minister (Art. 39)
- makes no mention of succession, instead leaving it to "constitutional practice."

== Criticism ==
The draft interim charter met with harsh criticism. Key concerns included:

- The overwhelming power of the executive branch, particularly the Cabinet (appointed by a Premier who is in turn appointed by the junta) and the CNS. The CNS would also be allowed to take part in Cabinet meetings.
- The lack of democratic elections for seats in the legislature. Under charter article 5, a 250-member National Legislative Assembly would be directly selected by the junta. This effectively meant that there would be no checks and balances to the junta's legislative and executive powers.
- The lack of controls for the drafting of a permanent constitution. Under charter articles 19 and 21, the CNS would appoint a 2000-member National Assembly which would in 7 days have to select 200 of its members to be candidates for the Constitution Drafting Assembly. Under charter articles 22 and 24, the CNS would select 100 of those candidates for royal appointment to the Assembly; it would also select the Assembly head. The Assembly would then appoint 25 of its members as constitution writers, with the CNS directly appointing 10 writers. This process effectively gave the junta complete control over the permanent constitution.
- The lack of controls to prevent members of the CNS, its panels, or its committees from running in elections. Under charter article 30, only the head of the CNS is banned.
- The use of an old charter if the permanent constitution not completed by a CNS-set deadline. The specific charter to revert to was not specified - the CNS and the Cabinet would choose which of Thailand's 16 previous charters to use. Many critics called for the use of the 1997 Constitution.
- The inability of the public to file written comments on the bills.
- The inclusion of King Bhumibol's theory of a self-sufficient economy in the preamble.
- The granting of legal authority for the junta's post-coup announcements and orders, including bans against demonstrations and political activities (Article 36).
- The granting of amnesty to the junta for executing the coup (Article 37).
- Junta bans against political activities, political gatherings of more than five people, and limits on press freedom remained in place.

Banjerd Singkhaneti, of Thammasat University, noted of the process for drafting a permanent constitution, "I think it will be a mess and the next constitution will be just that." Charoen Khumpeeraparp, of Silpakorn University, criticized the charter for protecting human rights according to commitments made under international treaties, claiming that it would not allow persecution of figures in the deposed government. Charoen claimed that no other countries let international commitments influence their local laws.

However, the draft interim charter did call for one democratic innovation: it required that a permanent constitution would have to be ratified by public referendum. This innovation was suggested in the draft 1974 Constitution, but was rejected by the royally-appointed Constitutional Convention. Nonetheless, the referendum proposal too has been condemned, as if the draft is rejected then under section 32 of the interim charter it is returned to the junta, which will write a constitution of its own in consultation with the Council of Ministers.

The interim charter was also criticized for being drafted without considering the views of the public. Meechai Ruchuphan, chief legal advisor for the junta, had earlier promised to heed opposing legal opinions. Komsan Phokong (Sukhothai Thammathirat Open University), Charoen Kampheeraphap (Silapakorn University), and Sasatra Toon (Rangsit University) had then sought and received the permission from the junta to present an alternative draft charter comprising 72 articles. "Meechai had promised to heed opposing legal opinions but failed to honour his word," Komsan said. Sasatra said Meechai acted like he was trying to perpetuate the power of the junta.

On 28 September, 6 scholars from Chiang Mai University and Midnight University protested the draft interim charter by dressing in black and tearing a mock-up of the draft in a press conference. The 6 included historian Nidhi Eawseewong, Worawit Charoenlert, Somchai Preecha-silpakul, Chatchawan Boonpan, Kriengsak Chetwattanawanich and Somkiat Tangnamo. The website of Midnight University was later shut down in response.

Thitinan Pongsudhirak of Chulalongkorn University noted that the charter was "alarming" and that "The problem for the military is that they are in deep now. They haven't done what they set out to do, which was to get rid of Thaksin, hand over power to a civilian government and step aside. They have not stepped aside."

Suriyasai Katasila, a key member of the anti-Thaksin People's Alliance for Democracy, criticized the charter for not containing restrictions which would bar seats in the National Legislative Assembly from former members and affiliates of Thaksin's Thai Rak Thai party.

Khomsan Phokhong, of Sukhothai Thammathirat Open University, demanded greater public participation in the charter-drafting process as well as restrictions against participation by members and affiliates of the Thai Rak Thai party. Somkhid Lertphaithoon, Deputy Rector of Thammasat University, demanded that the junta directly appoint 100 members to the Constitution Drafting Assembly rather than rely on a 2000-member National Assembly. He also called the interim constitution the best of its kind although he was disappointed it did not include a mission statement.

Somchai Siripreechakul, Dean of Law at Chiang Mai University, urged Prime Minister Surayud Chulanont to call a general election as soon as possible and hand the task of drafting a charter to the elected parliament.

The International Herald Tribune noted that the interim charter "appears to buttress the military's role in Thai politics."

Among human rights groups, the Hong Kong-based regional body the Asian Human Rights Commission has issued a series of statements condemning the interim charter as a work of "constitutional fiction".

== Permanent constitution ==
In December, the 2,000-member junta-appointed National Assembly elected 200 of its members as candidates for the Constitution Drafting Assembly. The voting was fraught with irregularities. The candidate with the highest number of votes was Okas Tepalakul from Chachoengsao province, a virtually unknown car dealership owner who was a former classmate of junta-head Sonthi Boonyaratglin. BMW Thailand executive Pharani Leenuthapong received the second highest number of votes. The controversial selection also saw Suwit Pipatwilaikul, a little-known Nong Bua Lamphu construction contractor who received the third highest number of votes. There were no representatives of farmers or workers in the final selection. Of the 200 final nominees, the nominee that received the lowest number of votes received just 7 votes. Assembly-member Maj Pol Gen Krerk Kalayanimitr claimed that some votes may have been bought. Of the 200 nominees, 74 were public sector bureaucrats, 34 were academics, 38 were from the social sector, and 54 were from the private sector.

The voting itself was full of irregularities. Members were lobbied in front of toilets and many Assembly-members marked their ballots before entering the polling booths (Normally, voters are handed ballot papers only when they enter the booth). A soldier guarding the entrance to the Parliament stopped a woman carrying 400,000 baht in cash. She refused to say why she was carrying so much money.

In December, junta chief Sonthi Boonyaratglin issued several guidelines for the permanent constitution being drafted by the CNS's drafting body. These included:

- Restricting a Prime Minister to serving a maximum of two terms of office
- Preventing a government from acting as a caretaker administration after dissolving Parliament.
- Making it easier to launch a no-confidence debate against the Prime Minister. Whereas the 1997 Constitution required 200 out of the House's 500 MPs to launch a no-confidence debate against the Prime Minister, Sonthi demanded that 100 MPs be sufficient.

He also made several suggestions, including:

- Transforming the Senate from an all-elected body in order to prevent relatives of politicians from being elected and thus perverting the non-partisan intent of the 1997 Constitution.
- Allowing politicians to switch political parties at any time. The 1997 Constitution required that any candidate for the House belong to a political party for 90 days before the registration date for an election.
- Banning the merger of political parties.

Sonthi later denied dictating the content for the new constitution, but stated "We can't force them to do things but responsible people will know what the constitution should look like."

== See also ==
- 2006 Thai coup d'état
- Constitution of Thailand
- Council for National Security
- Sonthi Boonyaratglin
