= Chang Noi =

Chang Noi (Thai: ช้างน้อย, 'little elephant') is a pseudonym jointly used by the British, but Thailand-based, historian Chris Baker and his wife, the Thai economist Pasuk Phongpaichit. Since 1996 they have published a column under this name in the English-language newspaper The Nation, writing about current political and social developments and events in Thailand.

The series was launched during the final phase of the country's economic boom. The subsequent framework was determined by the enactment of the 1997 Constitution, the Asian financial and economic crisis, the rise and fall of Thaksin Shinawatra, the 2006 coup d'état, and the new constitution of 2007. "Chang Noi" have mostly covered not the major headline topics, but rather their backgrounds and impacts on everyday life. The authors have addressed little noticed, but in their opinion significant, indications of changes in Thai society and self-view.

Their topics include criminal and political activities of so-called "godfathers", dam projects and environment, corruption and fraud cases, superstitious and spiritualistic beliefs and practice of important actors, the rise of nationalistic resentments after the crisis, hypocritical reactions towards the purported moral decline, political murder, extrajudicial killings during the "War on Drugs", obstruction of the work of activists and NGOs and other examples of authoritarian, suppressive and exclusionary tendencies in Thai politics.

According to the authors' concept, the "little elephant" "stomp(s) around" the "jungle" of Thai politics, "kicking up leaves, overturning rotten wood, and trumpeting in distress". Despite their serious topics, "Chang Noi" have in many of their articles chosen an ironical and humorous tone and metaphors. They have rarely conveyed their own views directly, but preferred to cite other critics or put opinions into the mouth of fictitious discussants. As a background for the understanding of current events, "Chang Noi" have also provided retrospectives of the modern Thai history, going back as far as to the end of absolute monarchy in Siam 1932.

A collection of 64 articles selected from nearly 400 written between 1996 and 2008 was published under the title Jungle Book in 2009.
