= 2006 Thai coup d'état =

Coup against Prime Minister Thaksin Shinawatra

- Part of the 2005–2006 Thai political crisis
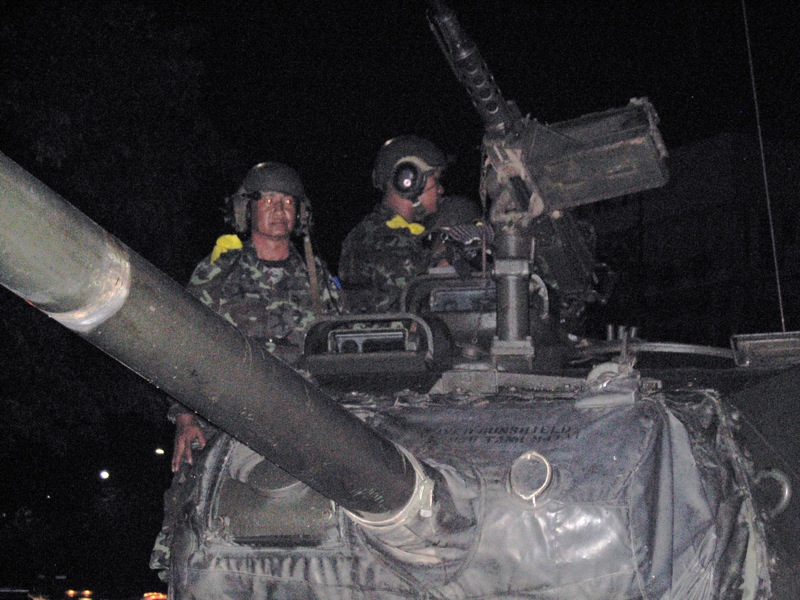
Date	19 September 2006; 20 years ago
Location	Thailand
Result	Successful Thai military and police takeover: Prime Minister Thaksin Shinawatra impeached; Cabinet of Thaksin dissolved; 1997 elected Senate dissolved; 1997 "People's Constitution" repealed; Military junta, Council for National Security (CNS) established; Sonthi Boonyaratglin became CNS leader and Surayud Chulanont became prime minister, endorsed by the King; 2006 interim constitution by CNS enacted; 2007 constitution by junta NLA enacted

Belligerents
Royal Thai Armed Forces; Royal Thai Army; Royal Thai Police	Government of Thailand

Commanders and leaders
Sonthi Boonyaratglin	Thaksin Shinawatra

The 2006 Thai coup d'état took place on 19 September 2006, when the Royal Thai Army staged a coup d'état against the elected caretaker government of Prime Minister Thaksin Shinawatra. The coup d'état, which was Thailand's first non-constitutional change of government in fifteen years since the 1991 Thai coup d'état, followed a year-long political crisis involving Thaksin, his allies, and political opponents and occurred less than a month before nationwide House elections were scheduled to be held. It has been widely reported in Thailand and elsewhere that General Prem Tinsulanonda, a key person in the military-monarchy nexus, Chairman of the Privy Council, was the mastermind of the coup. The military cancelled the scheduled 15 October elections, abrogated the 1997 constitution, dissolved parliament and the constitutional court, banned protests and all political activities, suppressed and censored the media, declared martial law nationwide, and arrested cabinet members.

The new rulers, led by General Sonthi Boonyaratglin and organised as the Council for Democratic Reform (CDR), issued a declaration on 21 September setting out their reasons for taking power and giving the commitment to restore democratic government within one year. However, the CDR also announced that after elections and the establishment of a democratic government, the council would be transformed into a Council of National Security (CNS) whose future role in Thai politics was not explained. The CNS later drafted an interim charter and appointed retired General Surayud Chulanont as Premier. Martial law was lifted in 41 of Thailand's 76 provinces on 26 January 2007 but remained in place in another 35 provinces. Elections were held on 23 December 2007, after a military-appointed tribunal outlawed the Thai Rak Thai (TRT) party of Thaksin and banned TRT executives from contesting in elections for five years.

The coup occurred after nearly two years of escalating anti-Thaksin sentiment, particularly in Bangkok. Even long-standing rural supporters of Thaksin reported increasing frustration at the tensions caused by the 2005–2006 Thai political crisis. Civilians were largely supportive of the military coup at the time. The 2006 coup is sometimes called the "unfinished coup" because another army general, Prayut Chan-o-cha, staged the 2014 Thai coup d'état eight years later. This second coup targeted the government of Yingluck Shinawatra, Thaksin's sister, and resulted in the removal of her government. The 2014 coup led to military control of the country for five years until 2019, and Prayut himself remained in power until 2023, a much longer tenure than that of the 2006 coup leaders.

== Background ==
Thirteen years before, a conflict in Thai politics between military factions caused the 1991 Thai coup d'état which ended in a bloody violent crackdown in 1992 by the Royal Thai Army and the Royal Thai Police. Thailand promulgated the 1997 constitution of Thailand, the 'people constitution', for the first time in the history of Thailand that both the upper house and lower house were directly elected. The populist Thai Rak Thai Party (TRT), led by Thaksin Shinawatra, won the 2001 Thai general election. After the end of Thaksin term, for the first time in history, he won the 2005 Thai general election by a landslide.

The 2005–2006 Thai political crisis began in October 2005, the website of the newspaper Phoochatkarn ran an article alleging that Thaksin had usurped the Royal powers of King Bhumibol Adulyadej by presiding over the ceremony. This blast, referring to a photo printed in The Nation newspaper, led Sondhi Limthongkul, the owner of Phoochatkarn, to start using We Love the King, We Will Fight for the King, and Return Power to the King as his key anti-Thaksin rallying slogans. This allegation has been repeated in Sondhi's Thailand Weekly live tapings. Sondhi formed the People's Alliance for Democracy (PAD), yellow shirts rallied the masses on the street and attacked Thaksin through his ASTV channel.

Early 2006, amid the Sale of Shin Corporation to Temasek Holdings, Thaksin called the April 2006 election following a mounting campaign of criticism of his financial dealings. The TRT won a majority of seats, partly as a result of the decision by the major opposition parties to boycott the elections led to party dissolution charges against the TRT. King Bhumibol took the unprecedented step of calling the elections undemocratic, and soon after the election was declared invalid by the Constitutional Court. New elections were scheduled for October 2006.

== Prelude ==
=== Earlier planning and rumours ===
Planning for the coup started about February 2006. Rumors of unrest in the armed forces and possible takeover plots swirled for months leading to the event. In May 2006, General Sonthi Boonyaratglin issued assurances that the military would not seize power. On 20 July 2006, around a hundred middle-ranking army officers said to be supporters of Thaksin were reassigned by the army high command, fueling rumors that the army was divided between supporters and opponents of the prime minister. In July 2006, 3rd Army Area Commander Saprang Kalayanamitr gave an interview in which he stated that Thai politics was below standard and that the kingdom's leadership was weak. He also claimed that Thailand had a false democracy. The public was becoming increasingly alarmed by each fresh rumor. In August 2006, there were reports of tank movements near Bangkok, but the military attributed these to a scheduled exercise. In early September, Thai police arrested five army officers, all members of Thailand's counter-insurgency command, after intercepting one of the officers with a bomb in a car allegedly targeting the prime minister's residence. Three of the suspects were released after the coup.

In December 2006, former National Security Council head Prasong Soonsiri claimed that he and five other senior military figures had been planning a coup as early as July. He claimed that Sonthi was one of those figures, but that Surayud and Prem were not involved at the time.

== Coup ==
=== 19 September ===
On the evening of 19 September 2006, the Thai military and police overthrew the elected government of Prime Minister Thaksin Shinawatra. At the time, the premier was in New York City at a meeting of the United Nations General Assembly.

- At 18:30, Royal Thai Army Special Forces units moved from Lopburi Province to Bangkok. At the same time, Prem Tinsulanonda, key person of military-monarchy nexus, Privy Council President, had an audience with King Bhumibol Adulyadej, reportedly concerning a merit-making ceremony for Bua Kitiyakara, the King's mother-in-law.
- By 21:00, the special forces units arrived in Bangkok.
- Around 21:30, Army-owned television broadcaster Channel 5 ceased scheduled programming and aired songs authored by the king. By this time, rumours started spreading that the military had arrested deputy prime minister in charge of national security Chitchai Wannasathit and Defence Minister Thammarak Isaragura na Ayuthaya, and that Thaksin's son had left the country. National radio, terrestrial TV, cable TV, and some satellite broadcasters were taken off air shortly after.
- At 21:40, police commandos arrived at the residence of Thaksin. Army tanks soon took position throughout Bangkok.
- At 22:20, Thaksin declared a state of emergency by telephone from New York. He transferred General Sonthi Boonyaratglin from his post as army commander to a position in the Prime Minister's Office and appointed Supreme Commander General Ruangroj Mahasaranon to take control of the crisis. His declaration, broadcast on television, was cut immediately afterwards.
- At 23:00 Thawinan Khongkran, Miss Asia 1987 and head of public relations for army-owned television station Channel 5, announced on TV that military and police units had Bangkok and the surrounding areas under control:

The armed forces commander and the national police commander have successfully taken over Bangkok and the surrounding area in order to maintain peace and order. There has been no struggle. We ask for the cooperation of the public and ask your pardon for the inconvenience. Thank you and good night.

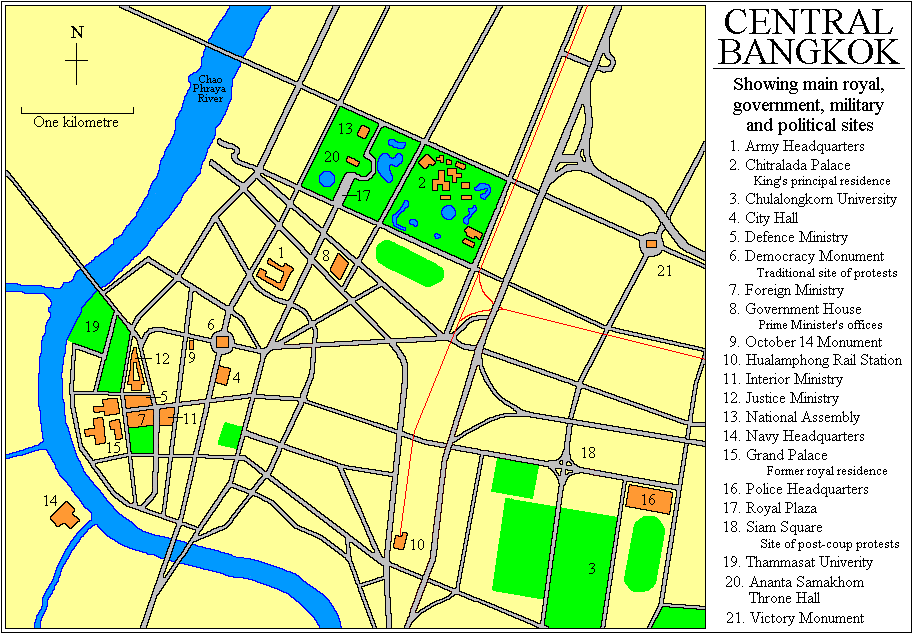
Central Bangkok showing sites named in this article or relevant to the events of September 2006

The junta, initially called the Council for Democratic Reform under Constitutional Monarchy (CDRM), later took the name of Council for Democratic Reform to rule out suspicions about the role of the monarchy.

- At 23:50, the CDR issued a second statement explaining the reasons for the coup d'état and wished "to reaffirm that it has no intention to become the administrators of the country." The council promised to retain the king as head of state and to return administrative power to the Thai people "as quickly as possible."

Foreign news channels, such as BBC World, CNN, CNBC, and Bloomberg Television, were reported to have been taken off air, although foreign broadcasters were still able to broadcast from Bangkok. Telecommunications networks (telephone and the Internet) were operational.

The army declared martial law nationwide, ordered all soldiers to report to their barracks and banned troop movements unauthorised by the CDR. Television footage showed heavily armed troops in M113 armored personnel carriers and M998 HMMWV vehicles on the streets of the city. Many soldiers and military vehicles wore strips of yellow cloth as a symbol of loyalty to the king, whose royal color is yellow.

Junta commander Sonthi confirmed that Deputy Prime Minister Chitchai and Defence Minister Thammarak had been arrested. High-ranked civil servants were ordered to report to the council while governmental offices and banks would be closed on 20 September.

A few hours after news of the coup broke, BBC News reported that the leader of the coup would be meeting with the king later in the day, although it was unclear at that time what King Bhumibol's position on the coup was.

=== 20 September ===
Front page of the Bangkok Post, 20 September 2006

- By 00:39 a third statement suspended the constitution and dissolved the cabinet, both houses of parliament, and the constitutional court.
- At 01:30 (20:30 UTC) on 20 September it was announced that Thaksin had cancelled his speech at the United Nations. He watched his overthrow on television from a hotel in New York. Tom Kruesopon, a TRT member and an adviser to Thaksin, said the premier "has not given up his power. He is not seeking asylum."
- At 09:16 General Sonthi announced in a television conference that the military had needed to seize power in order to unite the nation after months of political turmoil:

We have seized power. The constitution, the Senate, the House of Representatives, the Cabinet and the Constitutional Court have all been dissolved. We agreed that the caretaker prime minister has caused an unprecedented rift in society, widespread corruption, nepotism, and interfered in independent agencies, crippling them so they cannot function. If the caretaker government is allowed to govern it will hurt the country. They have also repeatedly insulted the king. Thus the council needed to seize power to control the situation, to restore normalcy and to create unity as soon as possible.

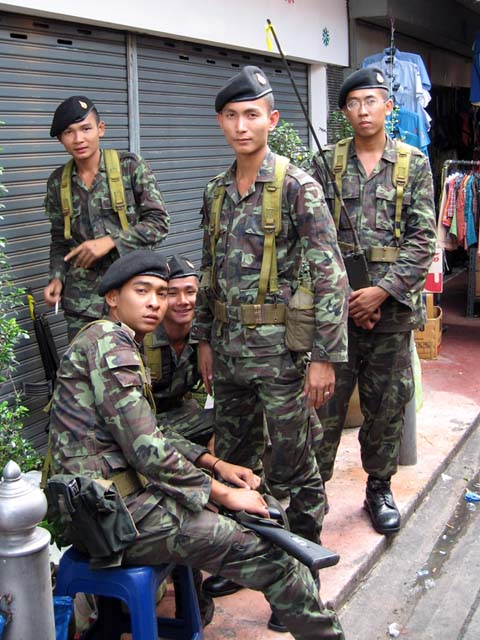
Soldiers of the Royal Thai Army in the streets of Bangkok on the day after the coup.

Shortly after this announcement, Thai TV programmes resumed whilst cable TV partly resumed. However, main foreign news channels (CNN, BBC, CNBC, NHK and Bloomberg) remained blacked out.

- At 12:14 Coup authorities demanded the cooperation of mass media, and later asked the Information and Communications Technology ministry (ICT) to control the distribution of all media information deemed harmful to the provisional military council.
- By 14:50, the 1997 constitution of the Kingdom of Thailand (also known as the "People's Constitution") was removed from the website of the National Assembly of Thailand.

The country's northern border with Laos and Myanmar was closed for a couple of days.

In an interview given before leaving New York for London with Deputy Prime Minister Surakiart Sathirathai, spokesman Surapong Suebwonglee, and his personal assistant Padung Limcharoenrat, Thaksin Shinawatra said:

I didn't expect that this will happen. I came here as Prime Minister but left as an unemployed man. It's fine that no one gives me a job. I volunteered to work but they didn't want to give me job, so it's fine.

Thaksin was escorted to his home in Kensington where he joined his daughter Pinthongta, who is studying in London. A Foreign Office spokeswoman said that Thaksin's trip was a private visit.

- At 15:35, junta leader Sonthi announced that the military had no plans to seize Thaksin's personal assets or seize shares of Shin Corporation back from Temasek Holdings. Early in 2006, Thaksin sold his family's shares in Shin Corporation to Temasek.
- At 20:17 General Sonthi announced in a television statement that King Bhumibol Adulyadej had endorsed him as the head of the interim governing council. He also promised to restore democracy in a year's time.

Late in the evening, a spokesman of the CDR announced that the king has issued a royal command to appoint Sonthi as the CDR president.

Contradicting earlier announcements, the CDR issued a 13th statement maintaining the status of the newly selected Election Commission and adding that the EC ACT would organize the election of local administrations and councils.

The CDR then issued its seventh order dividing responsibilities into four divisions as part of responsibility sharing. The four divisions were the CDR, the secretariat, the advisory division, and the special affairs division.

=== 21 September ===
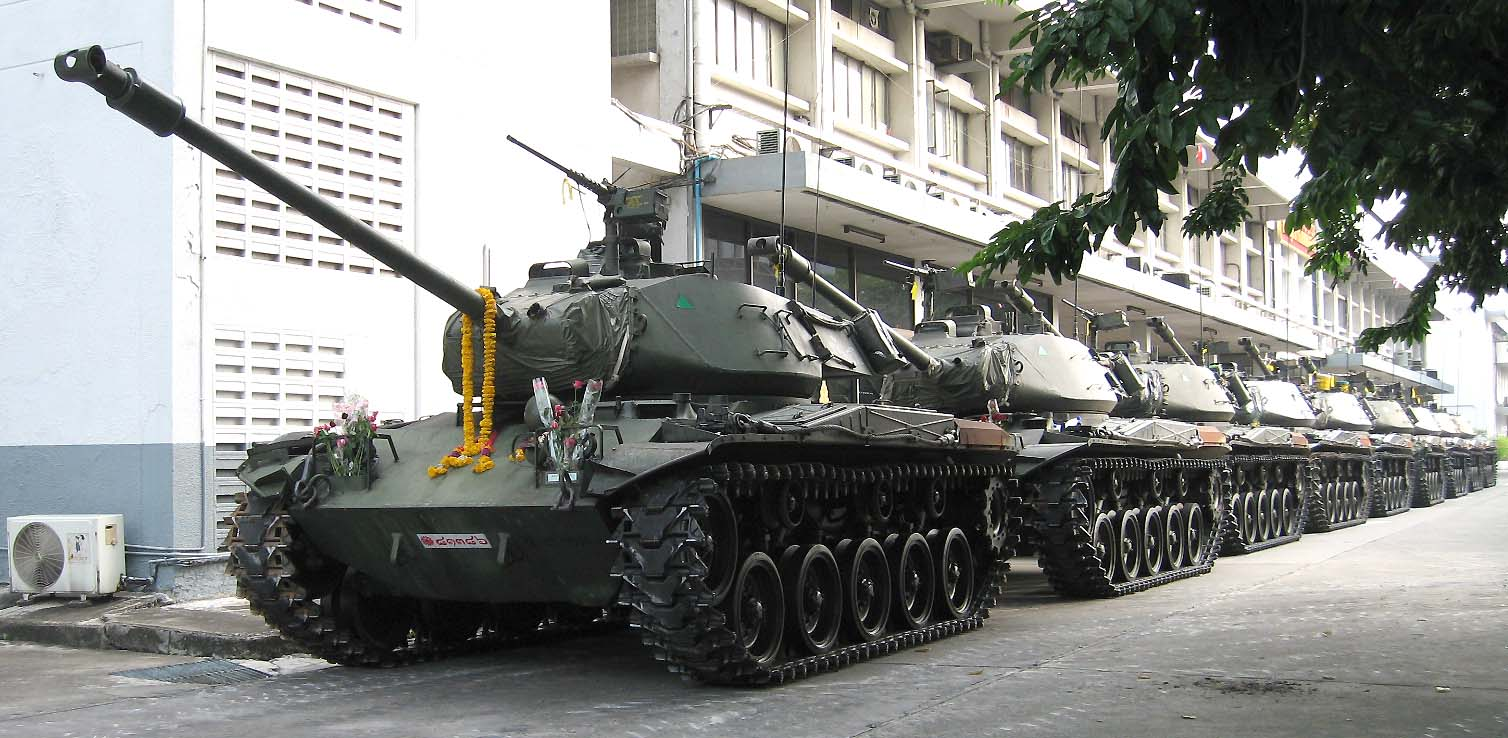
Armoured vehicles (M41 Walker Bulldog) parked inside the compound of the Headquarters of the 1st Army

The files and papers related to the investigation of the alleged car bomb plot against Thaksin (24 August 2006) vanished from the Crime Suppression Division (CSD) on the night of 19 September. Police loyal to deputy police chief General Priewphan Damapong (brother of Thaksin's wife Khunying Potjaman) were also seen loading assault weapons from the CSD in vehicles that went off to an unknown destination.

In the afternoon, Sonthi summoned media executives to army headquarters to tell them to stop carrying expression of public opinion following the military takeover. The move came after the military imposed strict controls on the media and said they would block information deemed harmful to the provisional military council now in control of Thailand. The army official said the normal television programming will be resumed but the council would begin making its own televised announcements every two hours starting from 11:00 am (04:00 GMT).

RTA Troops and tanks began reducing their presence at key government facilities. Four tanks remained at Government House in the early morning, down from 10 the previous day, and fewer armed soldiers were on guard.

Sonthi ordered two more top aides of Thaksin, namely Newin Chidchob, the minister attached to the premier's office, and Yongyuth Tiyapairat, minister of natural resources and environment, to report to the military, one day after detaining his senior deputy.

Ousted deputy prime minister Somkid Jatusripitak arrived at the Don Mueang International Airport returning from France.

The chartered Thai Airways jet that took Thaksin to New York and later to London returned to the Don Mueang Military Airport after being diverted from Bangkok's commercial airport. On board the plane were some 20 members of the press corps and low-ranking officials who had travelled with him. Ten heavily armed commandos immediately surrounded the plane and conducted an inspection. All were released after their passports were stamped.

Thaksin called for new snap elections in his homeland and confirmed he is bowing out of politics, urging "national reconciliation" after the coup in Bangkok. In a statement issued in London, Thaksin said he will devote himself to development and possibly charity work.

We hope the new regime will quickly arrange a new general election and continue to uphold the principles of democracy for the future of all Thais.

=== Timing of the coup ===
Columnist Thanong Khanthong of The Nation claimed that General Sonthi acted to prevent an imminent military coup by Thaksin. The columnist contended that Thaksin intended to use the political rally planned by the People's Alliance for Democracy at the Royal Plaza on 20 September to trigger violence and then declare a state of emergency and place the country under martial law. General Sonthi would have learned from an intelligence report that Yongyuth Tiyapairat and Newin Chidchob were planning to organise a counter protest with the support of the Forestry Police ("Hunter Soldiers" or Rangers) armed with HK33 rifles and acted before the bloodshed was set to take place. On Friday, the Rangers were in the process of being disarmed. Both Newin and Yongyuth were later detained, the latter being accused of mobilizing the Forestry Police. Coup-planner Prasong Soonsiri later denied that Thaksin planned his own coup.

However, fellow The Nation columnist "Chang Noi" called Thanong Khanthong's claims "a myth" that had "achieved the status of 'fact'." Chang Noi noted the absolute lack of any corroborating evidence to support the claims of imminent violence as well as the lack of opposing troop movements on the night of the coup. Chang Noi called the myth a "salve" for people "surprised and a little ashamed to find themselves supporting a coup. This myth makes the coup reactive and defensive." He also noted that General Saprang Kalayanamitr, commander of the Third Army, claimed that planning for the coup had begun 7 months in advance, thus contradicting claims that the coup was executed as a reactive pre-emptive strike against violence and Sonthi's who had said "hundreds of thousands" of pro- and anti-Thaksin supporters planned to descend on Bangkok.

Sonthi later said in an interview that the coup was originally planned for 20 September, to coincide with a major anti-Thaksin rally also planned for that day. He cited the "Portuguese example" in which anti-government rallies coincided with a successful military rebellion which overthrew King Manuel II of Portugal and established the Portuguese First Republic. The coup was moved up to 19 September, when Thaksin was still in New York. Sonthi also stated that the coup was not an urgent measure mooted just a couple of days earlier. Sonthi also claimed that during a lunch that Thaksin had with the commanders of the armed forces, Thaksin had asked him "Will you stage a coup?" Sonthi replied: "I will." This contradicted earlier public statements where he denied that the military would stage a coup.

The Nation noted that the timing of the coup contains many instances of the number nine, a highly auspicious number in Thai numerology. The coup occurred at the 19th day of the 9th month of Buddhist Era 2549. Sonthi made a major public announcement on the morning after the coup at 9.39 am. The Nation earlier indicated 09:16 as the time for Sonthi's press conference and the Buddhist calendar is in line with the Gregorian calendar only since 1941.

=== Coup financing ===
The junta was accused of paying Army officers 1.5 billion baht in order to participate in the coup. Junta leader Sonthi Boonyaratkalin stopped short of denying that the military spent money from a secret fund, saying "We certainly needed money for our people's food and other necessary expenses."

=== Causes of the coup ===
Many causes of the coup were identified, both by the junta as well as by independent observers. Initial reasons stated by the junta were the Thaksin government's alleged creation of an "unprecedented rift in society", corruption, nepotism, interference in independent agencies, and insults to the King. Later reasons stated by junta leaders included Thaksin's alleged vote buying, plans to provoke violence, and weakening of the military.

Two months after the coup, the junta issued a white paper identifying many reasons for the coup, including corruption, abuse of power, lack of integrity, interference in the checks and balances system, human rights violations, and destroying the unity of the people.

Independent analysts identified widely differing reasons for the coup. Thitinan Pongsudhirak of Chulalongkorn University alleged that the coup was due to conflicts between Thaksin and King Bhumibol Adulyadej. Biographer Paul Handley noted that "[the coup masterminds] did not want Thaksin in a position to exert influence on the passing of the Chakri Dynasty mantle to Crown Prince Vajiralongkorn." Giles Ungpakorn of Chulalongkorn University claimed that the coup was due to class conflicts between the rural poor (who supported Thaksin) and the urban elite (who supported the junta).

=== Photo-timeline of the coup, from dusk to dawn ===
The scene changed every hour as the coup progressed. Here is how it unfolded after the first tanks rolled in according to the observations of Manik Sethisuwan. Manik was one of a few citizens who was forced to spend the night on the street as his car had run out of gas. According to government laws as of September 2006, it was mandatory for all gas and petrol stations in the city to close-down from 22:00–05:00 as a cost-saving measure. Hence he was forced to seek refuge near the international press personnel until it was possible for him to move out, as a result of which he was able to capture most of the event as it unfolded.

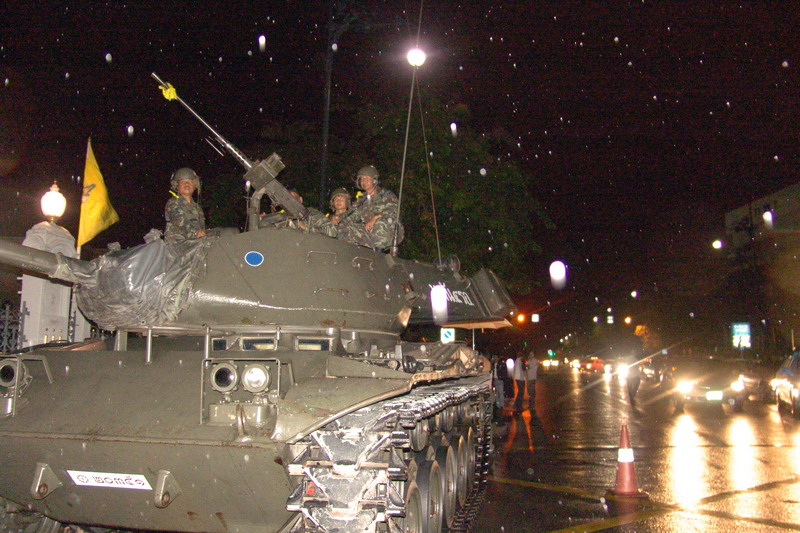
As the tanks (including this M41 Walker Bulldog) rolled in, a slight out-of-season drizzle poured over the city.

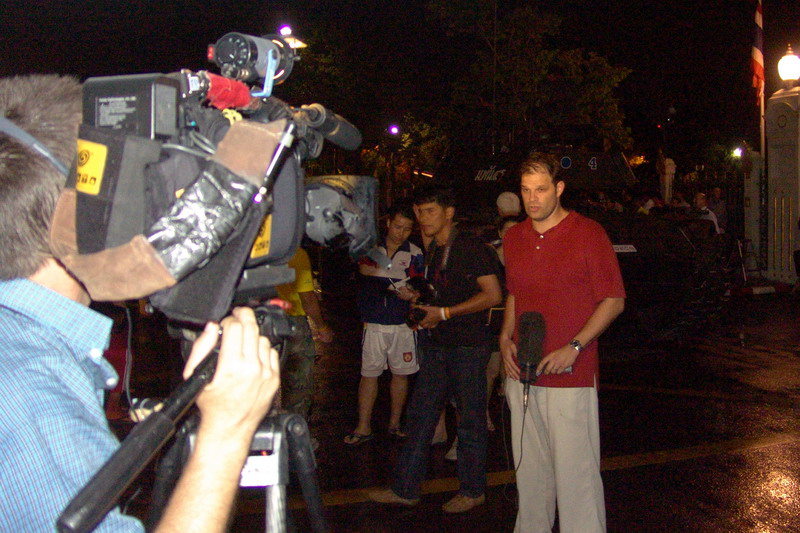
News media from around the world gathered at Government House. Pictured here is the Australian Broadcasting Corporation.

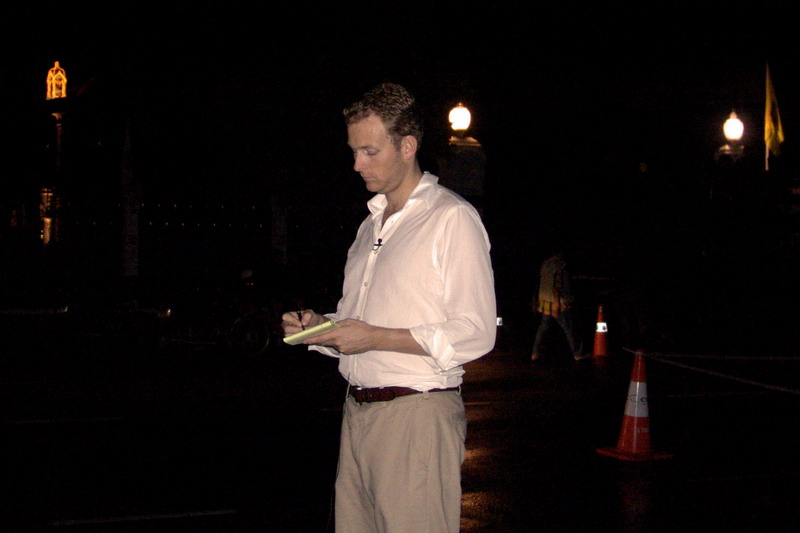
CNN Reporter Dan Rivers prepares his news report. However, the feeds within the country itself were blocked off, as well as most internet service providers.

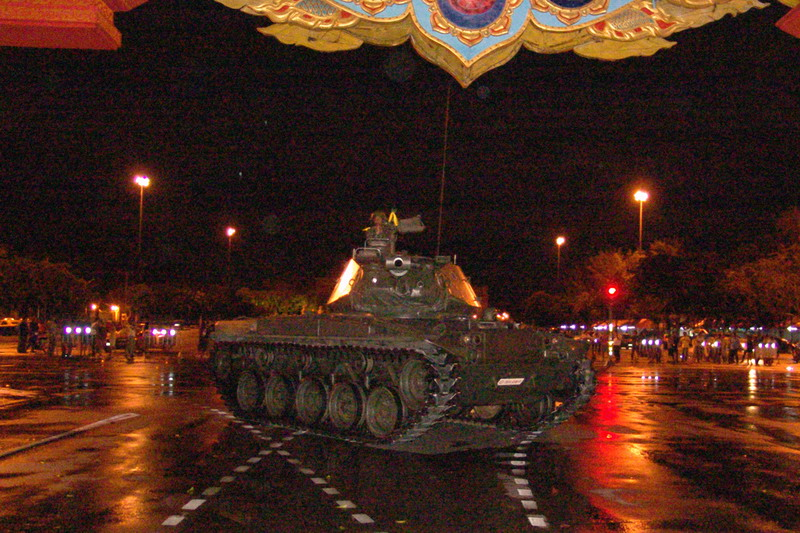
A M41 Walker Bulldog light tank parked in the centre of Rajadamnern Avenue, in front of the Parliament House.

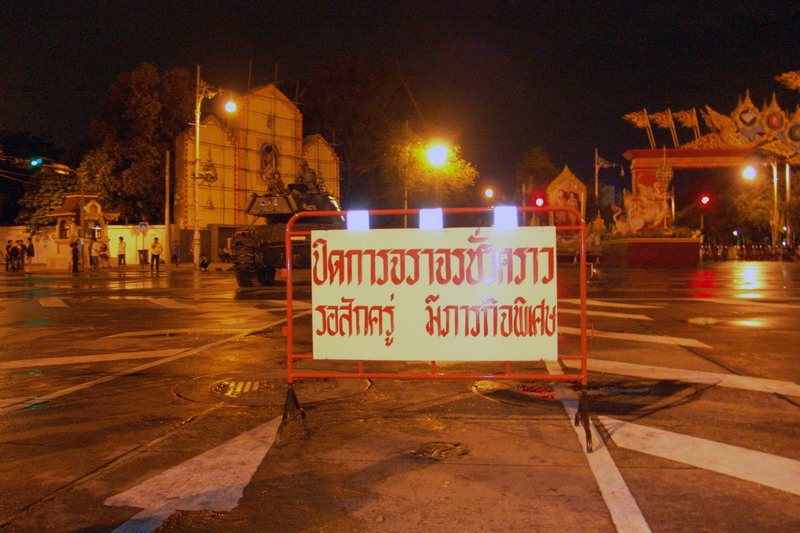
A sign in Thai which reads "Special Operation in Progress – Traffic Temporarily Suspended".

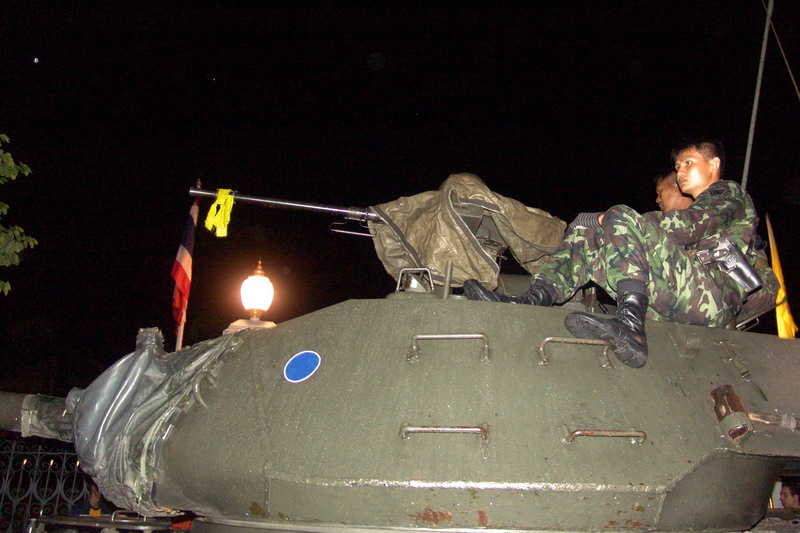
The colour of the day, yellow ribbons on machine guns of a M41 Walker Bulldog. Yellow is the color of the King.

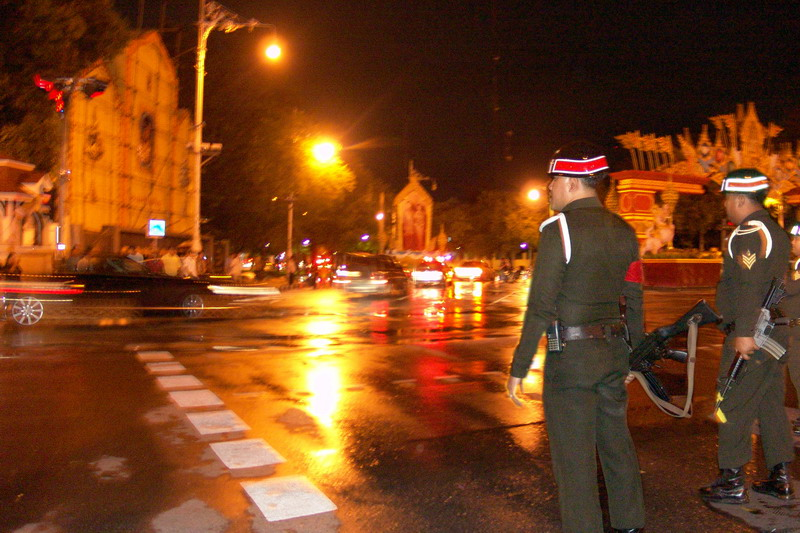
A speeding motorcade of cars. The military leaders on their way from the royal palace as the military police look on.

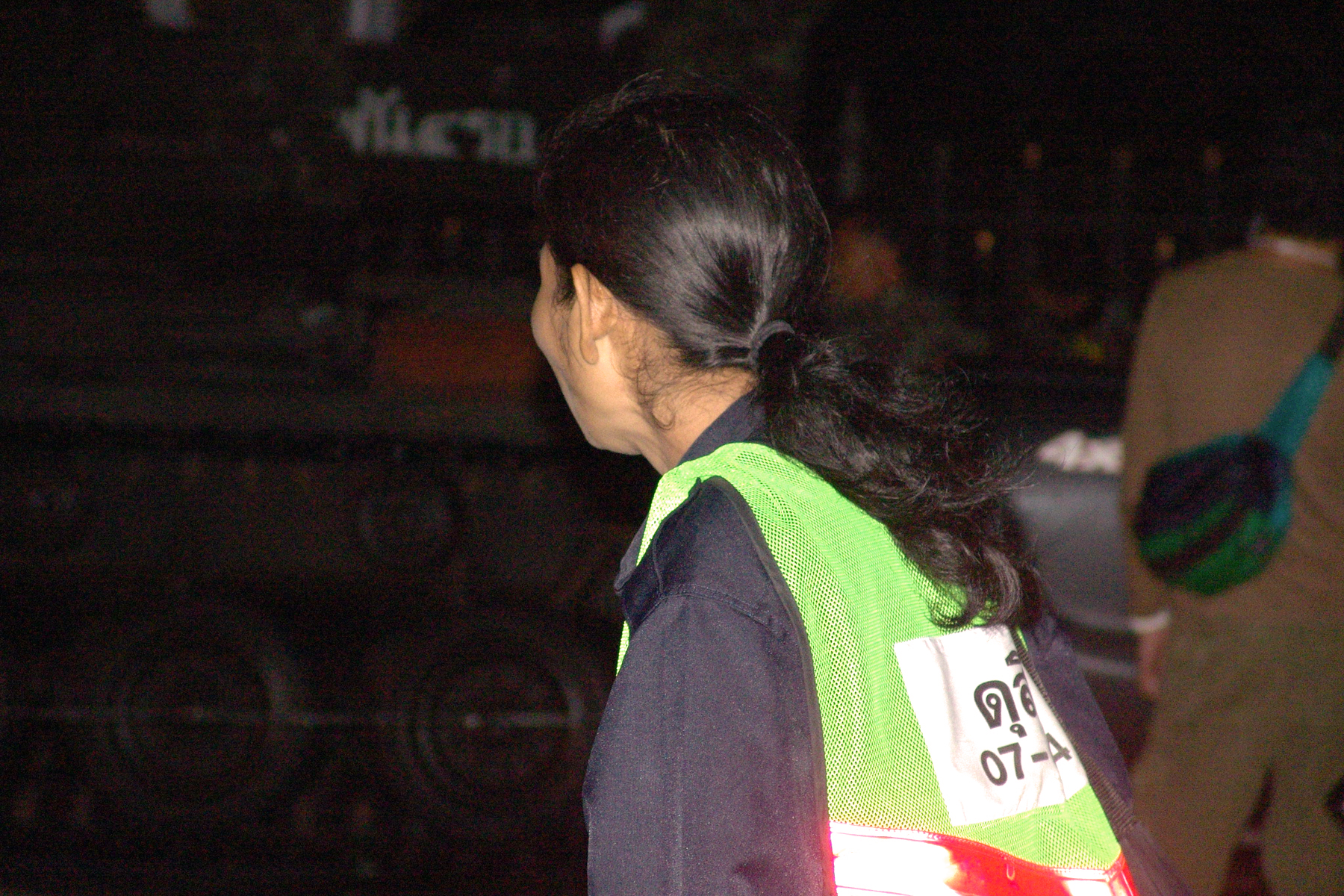
A street worker viewing M41 Walker Bulldog light tanks, not sure what to make of it.

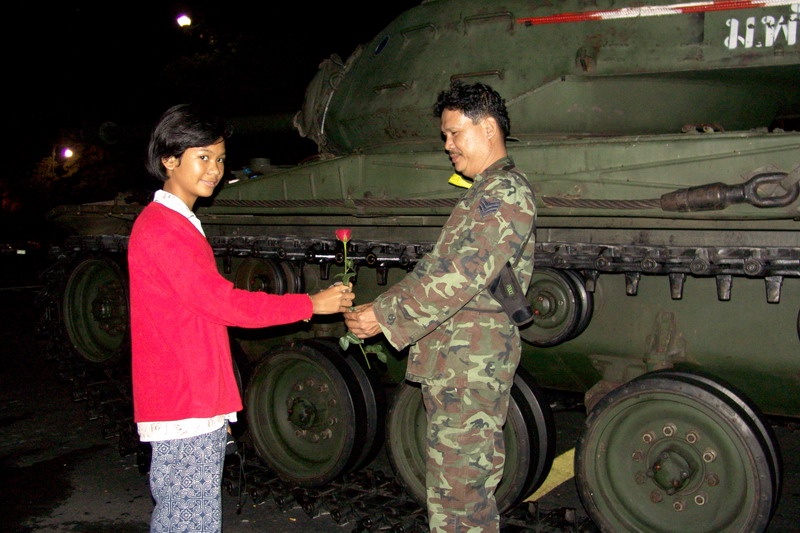
The first signs of support. A teenager hands a rose to a soldier at a M41 Walker Bulldog light tank.

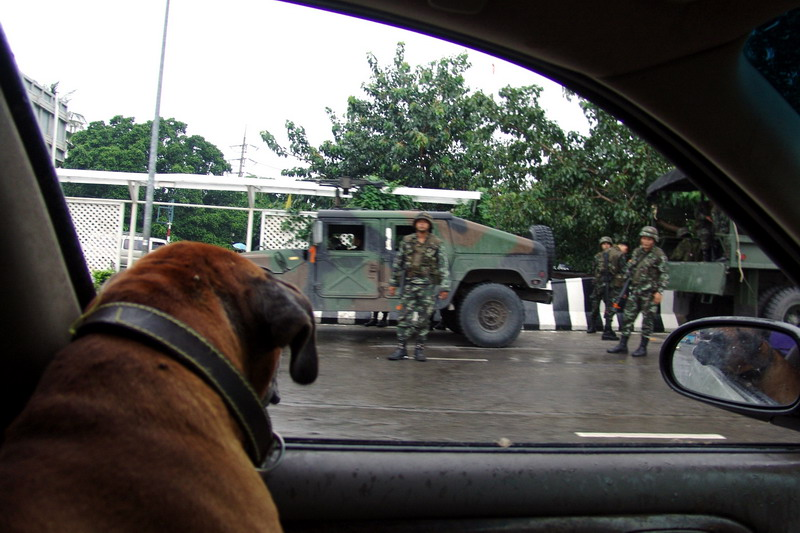
Seen here is a Humvee utility vehicle with several soldiers.

=== Thailand's political situation ===
==== Thailand's deposed government ====
===== Outside Thailand =====
After the coup, Thaksin flew from New York to London, where his daughter was a student. He was later joined by his family. General Sonthi Boonyaratglin said earlier that ousted prime minister Thaksin Shinawatra could return to the country, but warned he could face criminal charges. "Any prosecution would proceed under the law, and would depend on the evidence," Sonthi said. However, Privy Councilor and interim prime minister General Surayud Chulanont later warned against Thaksin's return, calling his return a "threat." "Myself and several other people understand that supporters and opponents will clash on the day that Thaksin returns home. It would be a big commotion," he said.

Deputy Premier Surakiart Sathirathai was with Thaksin attending the UN General Assembly in New York when the military staged a coup on Tuesday against the prime minister. Surakiart was, at the time, in the hotly contested race to succeed UN Secretary General Kofi Annan, a Thai official said. "The (new) Thai authorities have reaffirmed their support for Dr Surakiart's candidature for the UNSG," Thai ambassador to the United States Virasakdi Futrakul told AFP. "There's no change. He's still in the race." The former deputy premier had left for Bangkok after the junta took power.

Finance Minister Thanong Bidaya remained in Singapore where he was attending the annual meeting of the World Bank/IMF. Commerce Minister Somkid Jatusripitak remained in Paris, but returned to Bangkok on Thursday. Foreign Minister Kantathi Suphamongkhon flew from Paris, where he was attending the Thai-France Cultural Exhibition presided over by Princess Sirindhorn, to Germany, before returning to Bangkok. Agriculture Minister Sudarat Keyuraphan was reported to have fled to Paris with her family. Thai Rak Thai party executive and former Interior Minister Kongsak Wantana left the country for Germany.

===== Arrested or detained by the junta =====
Deputy Prime Minister in charge of national security Chitchai Wannasathit was arrested after the coup and detained at the army. He was detained on Wednesday and was held at a guesthouse on the northern outskirts of Bangkok, according to army spokesman Colonel Acar Tiproj. Defence Minister Thammarak Isaragura na Ayuthaya's whereabouts were unknown. Former Secretary-General to the Premier Prommin Lertsuridej and Labor Ministry Permanent Secretary Somchai Wongsawat (who is Thaksin's brother-in-law) were also placed under arrest on the second floor of the army command building. The Secretary-General was last reported being detained at the same guesthouse as the Deputy Chitchai Wannasathit.

Natural Resources and Environmental Minister Yongyuth Tiyapairat and Deputy Agriculture Minister Newin Chidchop were ordered to report to the junta by noon Thursday. The junta did not specify what punishment they would receive if they failed to report. At the time, there were reports that both Yongyuth and Newin were in London. Troops raided Yongyuth's houses in Mae Chan District of Chiang Rai Province (at 10:35 Wednesday) and Bangkok (Wednesday night), but did not find him. Both Yongyuth and Newin reported to army headquarters on Thursday, and were detained.

Chidchai Wannasathit, Newin Chidchop, Yongyuth Tiyapairat, and Prommin Lertsuridet were freed after the interim charter was promulgated. The status of Thammarak Isaragura na Ayuthaya was unknown.

==== In Thailand ====
Several party executives including Chaturon Chaisang, Phumtham Wechayachai and Suranand Vejjajiva were reported to still be in Thailand and not arrested by the junta. TRT MP Veera Musikapong was also at liberty. Party Deputy and Industry Minister Suriya Jungrungreangkit and former Social Development and Human Security Minister Watana Muangsook were reported to be staying in the country at an unidentified location.

===== Civil servants, government agencies and family =====
The junta initiated the removal from the civil service of people appointed by the Thaksin government as well as his former classmates at the Armed Forces Academies Preparatory School. Several military officers were transferred to inactive posts. Also removed were 18 senior police officers which the junta claimed could pose a threat to national security if they were to remain in their current posts. In early February, Police Commissioner-General Kowit Wattana himself was ousted for investigating military involvement in the 2007 Bangkok bombings.

The purge was completed in the junta's mid-year military reshuffle in April 2007, when all senior officers perceived as loyal to the Thaksin government were removed and replaced with officers trusted by the new regime.

The junta affirmed on 20 September that along with the abolition of the constitution, the constitutional court, and other independent organisations set up under the abrogated charter were automatically abolished. However, the status of Auditor-General Jaruvan Maintaka was maintained by an order of the junta. The same order dissolved the State Audit Commission. She appeared when summoned along with senior government officials by the junta.

Surasit Sangkhapong, director of the Government Lottery Office and an aide of Thaksin resigned to allow Auditor-General Jaruvan Maintaka to conduct an investigation into an allegation of irregularity.

Colonel Priewphan Damapong, Deputy Police Commissioner-General and brother-in-law of Thaksin, reported to the national police chief in line with the junta's orders.

Thaksin's wife and son, initially reported as having left Thailand for Singapore ahead of the declaration of martial law, were later reported in Thailand. It was suggested they remained to look after the family's finances. On Monday 25 September Pojaman Shinawatra left Bangkok at 01:30 (18:30 GMT) to join her husband in London.

=== Council for Democratic Reform ===
The junta ruled with a series of announcements. An early announcement asked the media to call it by its full name, the Council for Democratic Reform under the Constitutional Monarchy (CDRM), rather than just the Council for Democratic Reform (CDR). The junta said that the public might be misled if it was not understood that the junta was working "under the Constitutional Monarchy". Later, the junta formally shortened its English name (but not its Thai name) to Council for Democratic Reform (CDR) in order to avoid any suspicions about the role of the monarchy in the coup.

The 11th official announcement of the military regime outlined its leadership. It was composed of the leaders of all branches of the Thai military and police.

- Army Commander General Sonthi Boonyaratglin, named Chief of the Council for Democratic Reform
- Navy Commander Admiral Sathiraphan Keyanon, named first deputy chief of CDR
- Air Force Commander Air Chief Marshal Chalit Pookpasuk, named second deputy chief of CDR
- Police Commissioner-General Police General Kowit Wattana, named third deputy chief of CDR
- National Security Council Secretary-General General Winai Phatthiyakul, named Secretary-General of the CDR
- Supreme Commander General Ruangroj Mahasaranon, named Chief Adviser to the CDR

On 20 September 2006, the junta denied that it had appointed a prime minister, and noted that Sonthi had the powers of a Premier.

A week after the coup, Sonthi's former classmate General Boonsrang Naimpradit was promoted from Deputy Supreme Commander to the post of Supreme Commander, replacing Ruangroj Mahasaranon. Junta Secretary General Winai Phattiyakul, was promoted to the post of Permanent Secretary for Defence.

Sonthi also promoted his classmates and lieutenants in the coup, 1st Army Region Commander Lt-Gen Anupong Paochinda and 3rd Army Region Commander Lt-Gen Saprang Kalayanamitr, to the post of Assistant Army Commander.

Sonthi told Reuters:"I can assure you it is impossible that we will control the government. [...] We will be the government's tool to keep peace."

In its 16th announcement, the CDR gave itself the role of parliament. On 22 September, the junta gave Police General Kowit Wattana absolute power over all police matters and named him chair of a new National Police Commission to rewrite the 2004 National Police Bill.

==== Appointment of advisory committee ====
The junta ordered 58 prominent civilians to serve as its advisers. However, most of the appointees denied any knowledge of the appointments, with several saying they couldn't serve. "I have said that the coup is wrong, how can I serve as its advisory board?" asked Chaiwat Satha-anand of the Faculty of Political Science of Chulalongkorn University. Pratheep Ungsongtham Hata, who was appointed to the reconciliation panel, also boycotted the CDR's advisory board, noting that as a democracy advocate, she could not work with the CDR, which took power by unconstitutional means. Pibhob Dhongchai, a leader of the defunct anti-Thaksin People's Alliance for Democracy, said he could not participate in the reconciliation panel because he was a member of the National Economic and Social Advisory Council, and already had a channel to advise the government.

Pasuk Pongpaichit, an anti-Thaksin economist who had also been appointed, denied that she would serve as an advisor, using as her excuse an impending extended trip to Japan. However, some appointees welcomed their appointments, like Nakarin Mektrairat and Thawee Suraritthikul, the deans of the Faculty of Political Science of Thammasat and Sukhothai Thammathirat University, respectively. When asked by the press why the junta had not informed the appointees of their appointments, the CDR spokesman Lt-Gen Palangoon Klaharn said: "It is not necessary. Some matters are urgent. It is an honour to help the country. I believe that those who have been named will not reject the appointment because we haven't damaged their reputation."

==== Investigation of the deposed government ====
The junta established a committee empowered to investigate any projects or acts by members of the Thaksin government and others who were suspected of any irregularities, including personal tax evasion. The committee, chaired by Nam Yimyaem, had the authority to freeze the assets of members and families of the Thaksin government accused of corruption and was composed of several figures who had been publicly critical of the Thaksin government, including Kaewsan Atibhoti, Jaruvan Maintaka, Banjerd Singkaneti, Klanarong Chantik, and Sak Korsaengruang.

A separate decree (No. 31) gave the NCCC the authority to freeze the assets of politicians who failed to report their financial status by a deadline or intentionally reported false information. Another decree (No. 27) increased the penalty for political party executives whose parties had been ordered dissolved, from simply banning them from forming or becoming executives of a new party, to stripping them of their electoral rights for five years.

==== Interim constitution ====
A draft interim constitution was released on 27 September 2006, and received mixed reactions. Structurally, the draft was similar to the 1991 Constitution, the 1976 Constitution, and the 1959 Charter, in that it allows an extremely powerful executive branch to appoint the entire legislature. The CDR, which would be transformed into a Council for National Security (CNS), would appoint the head of the executive branch, the entire legislature, and the drafters of a permanent constitution.

=== Thailand's future government ===
Sonthi told foreign diplomats that a civilian government and prime minister would be appointed to run the country within two weeks. The constitution would be amended for a rapid return to democracy through a national election in a year's time. This would imply that the October 2006 elections will not take place as scheduled.

Sonthi confirmed a previous statement saying that Thaksin and the members of his cabinet have done no wrong and can return to Thailand. However, Privy Councilor and top contender of appointment as interim prime minister General Surayud Chulanont warned against Thaksin's return, calling his return a "threat."

Sonthi said Thailand was and still is a democracy and that tourists can continue to visit the country normally. The U.S. State Department has not issued a travel warning for Thailand, but has advised tourists to be vigilant.

On 20 September 2006, Sonthi pledged to hold general elections by October 2007.

Many civilians were rumored to have been short-listed for appointment to figurehead prime minister. These included General Surayud Chulanont (Privy Councilor to King Bhumibol Adulyadej), Akharathorn Chularat, (Chief Justice of the Supreme Administrative Court), and Pridiyathorn Devakula, (Governor of the Bank of Thailand), and Supachai Panitchpakdi (Secretary-General of the United Nations Conference on Trade and Development).

On 26 September 2006, Sonthi said that the junta would remain in place after the appointment of a civilian government, noting "It's necessary to keep the council so that there is no loophole for the executive branch."

Following the appointment of a new interim civilian government, the junta would be transformed into a permanent "Council of National Security". It will dissolve itself once the general election is held a year later.

=== Restrictions on human rights and freedom of expression ===
For general information about the Thai media, see Media in Thailand. For information about censorship in Thailand prior to the coup see Censorship in Thailand.

Over 90 percent of Thais own a television and over 50 percent own a radio. For most Thais, TV and radio are the only source of daily news and information about the coup. Less than 20 percent of the population reads daily newspapers. As of 2004 Internet users made up less than 12 percent of the population nationwide, and 26 percent in the Bangkok area. The junta imposed and maintained censorship on television from the first day of the coup onwards. However, no newspaper publications were suppressed and censorship of the Internet did not start until several days after the coup.

==== Restrictions on broadcasting and the press ====
The CDR demanded the cooperation of the Thai mass media and authorised the censorship of news reports that might be negative to the military. During the first 12 hours of the coup information was available only to those able to access the Internet or receive TV channels by satellites not controlled by the junta.

===== Television censorship =====
On the evening of 19 September, regular programmes on Thai television channels were replaced by video clips and music authored by the king. The next day, shortly after Sonthi's TV conference, all Thai channels were back on air under control of the ICT ministry authorised to censor information.

On 21 September 2006, the CDR summoned media executives to army headquarters and ordered them to stop carrying expressions of public opinion. This included a ban against the common practice of broadcasting viewers' text messages on a news ticker. The junta did not say whether the ban would extend to newspaper editorials or internet web boards.

Thai television broadcasters did not air footage of demonstrations against the coup, including the first major protest on 22 September at Siam Square.

Local cable broadcasts of CNN, BBC, CNBC, NHK, and several other foreign news channels were censored, with all footage involving Thaksin blacked out.

On 21 September 2006, The Guardian disclosed that armed soldiers are sitting in every television news studio and control room. On Thursday, 12 October 2006, Suwanna Uyanan, vice president of the Thai Broadcasting Journalists Association, said that soldiers were occupying Channel 11, where she worked.

The nine members of Board of Directors of MCOT, a privatised state-owned media company, resigned effective 27 September, in order to take responsibility for allowing Thaksin to address the nation on MCOT-controlled Modernine TV (Channel 9).

===== Radio censorship =====
On Thursday, 21 September 2006, the CDR ordered more than 300 community radio stations in Chiang Mai, Chiang Rai, and Mae Hong Son to suspend broadcasts. Community radio stations in Lamphun, Lampang, and Phayao were also ordered to turn their transmitters off. In addition, the pro-Thaksin Muan Chon Community Radio in Udon Thani stopped broadcasting on Wednesday. Police were stationed at the radio building as well as the office of Siang Tham Community Radio Station, owned by revered monk Luang Ta Maha Bua. Maha Bua had been a key supporter of the People's Alliance for Democracy.

In response to the community radio ban, some station operators vowed to air only non-political programmes. They promised self-censorship to ensure their programmes would not infringe against CDR rules. Others in the north initiated a signed pledge campaign that they would not become involved in politics and that their programming would be completely free of politics.

===== Press censorship =====
The websites of the leading Bangkok newspapers Bangkok Post, The Nation, and Thai Rath had been functioning normally and were reporting the coup. Both the Bangkok Post and The Nation had been strong critics of the deposed government. The Daily News website included extensive photographic coverage of the military operations. On the morning of 20 September newspapers were available as usual.

On 23 September 2006, the CDR said they would "urgently retaliate against foreign reporters whose coverage has been deemed insulting to the monarchy." Numerous international news agencies speculated at the king's role in the coup.

===== Internet censorship =====
On 21 September, during a meeting with internet service providers and operators of TV stations, radio stations, and other ICT businesses, the ICT Ministry (ICT) asked webmasters to close political webboards found to contain provocative messages for 12 days. Kraisorn Pornsuthee, ICT Permanent Secretary said that websites and webboards will face permanent closure if such messages continue to appear, but that messages could be posted on webboards as long as they do not provoke any misunderstandings. The anti-coup website 19sep.org was shut down, but later relocated to the US. The official website of the Thai Rak Thai party was also shut down.

On 27 September, the ICT ministry confirmed that at least 10 websites were shut down for violating the junta's regulations.

The Midnight University website, a free scholarly resource and discussion board, was temporarily shut down after the management of Midnight University and scholars from Chiang Mai University conducted a protest against the junta's draft interim charter. Somkiat Tangnamo, the webmaster of Midnight University, claimed the site contained 1,500 free scholarly articles and received 2.5 million visits per month. Kasian Tejapira of Thammasat University claimed the website was "the foremost free and critical educational and public intellectual website in Thailand. The shutdown is not only a huge loss to academic and intellectual freedom in Thai society, but also the closure of a free forum for the contention of ideas so as to find a peaceful alternative to violent conflict in Thailand." Kraisorn Pornsuthee ICT Ministry permanent secretary said he did not know about the shutdown of the website and would ask for details from his officials.

In the second week after the coup, the Thai Rak Thai website was temporarily inaccessible, with no indication if it was an act of censure or not. The Thaksin.com website used by Thaksin to receive mail and comments from his supporters and to promote himself was also inaccessible.

==== Restrictions on political meetings and political parties ====
The military banned any gathering of five or more people for political purposes, threatening violators with six months in jail. On 20 September, the military arrested activist Chalard Worachat along with hunger striker and former MP Thawee Kraikup at Democracy Monument while they were peacefully protesting against the coup.

The anti-Thaksin People's Alliance for Democracy formally cancelled its scheduled rally for 20 September 2006 and later dissolved itself, after having reached its goal of toppling the Thaksin government. The status of the Mass Party, established by PAD leaders, was not known.

On 21 September, the junta banned political parties from holding meetings or from conducting any other activities, according to a statement read on national television. It also barred the establishment of new political parties.

In order to maintain law and order, meetings of political parties and conducting of other political activities are banned.

"Political gatherings of more than five people have already been banned, but political activities can resume when normalcy is restored," the statement said.

In its 22nd announcement, the junta ordered a complete ban on all political activities, including those at the local level like tambon administrative organizations and provincial administrative organisations.

Despite the bans, the organizers of the Thai Social Forum, a major nationwide conference of 300 social and political activists, insisted that the meeting would continue to take place at Thammasat University's Rangsit Center from 21 to 23 October. Jon Ungphakorn, an organizer said that the focus of the conference would be media reform and press freedom.

==== Restrictions on the right to travel ====
The military interpreted the restriction on the right to assembly as a restriction against travel, in at least one case. On the night of 25 September 100 teachers from Chiang Rai were traveling via bus to attend a social function in Chonburi Province when they were stopped by soldiers at a checkpoint. The soldiers refused to allow the two busloads of teachers to continue because they failed to provide a permit from the Chiang Rai army commander for them to move in a group larger than five people.

Large groups travelling into Bangkok were required to seek authorization from their district offices.

=== Role and position of the king ===
It was assumed by some Thai analysts and the international media that the coup had the support of King Bhumibol Adulyadej. For some analysts, the silence of both the King and Privy Council President General Prem Tinsulanonda on the day following the coup was taken as indicating support. Remarks made earlier in 2006 by Thaksin had been widely understood as a criticism of Prem's continued influence in Thai politics.

Royal endorsement is critical to establishing legitimacy for military rebellions. Every successful coup over the past 60 years has been endorsed by King Bhumibol. Previous unendorsed coups in 1981 and 1985 failed after at most a few days. For background, see King Bhumibol's role in Thai politics.

On 14 July 2006, Prem Tinsulanonda addressed graduating cadets of the Chulachomklao Royal Military Academy, telling them that the Thai military must obey the orders of the king, not the government.

At the time that special forces started mobilizing from Lopburi to Bangkok, Prem was having an audience with the king. This led to speculation outside Thailand that the king had advance knowledge of the coup, or even that he had executive control over it, although there was no direct evidence for this. The day after the coup, the king endorsed it and its leader. Given the extensive reserve powers retained by the king, this statement gave legitimacy to the coup and legal authority to Sonthi's position.

Some Thai analysts have said that the king must have at least been in favour of the coup. "The role of the king was critical in this crisis," said Thitinan Pongsudhirak of Chulalongkorn University, adding that "This coup was nothing short of Thaksin versus the King. He is widely seen as having implicitly endorsed the coup." Thitinan said he believed the king had allowed the coup to take place as it was the best option available, saying "What we were heading for otherwise was violence in the streets".

Sulak Sivaraksa, a well-known social critic, said, "Without his involvement, the coup would have been impossible." Sulak added that the king is "very skillful. He never becomes obviously involved. If this coup goes wrong, Sonthi will get the blame, but whatever happens, the King will only get praise."

The Bangkok correspondent of The Australian, Peter Alford, wrote: "The King's overriding commitment has always been to social stability...and by December last year, he had clearly lost any faith in Thaksin's capacity to govern without wedging the country apart...All Prem need do is refrain from criticising the coup... for almost all Thais to believe they know the King's will."

On 13 April 2008, the Asia Sentinel wrote: "Never mind elections, the fate of Thaksin's proxy party could be decided, yet again, by Thailand's royalist judges and generals. Thailand's proxy war between Thaksin loyalists and Bangkok's royalist elite is stirring once again, with the outcome as uncertain as ever."

== National reactions ==
The coup occurred after nearly two years of escalating anti-Thaksin sentiment, particularly in Bangkok. Even long-standing rural supporters of Thaksin reported increasing frustration at the tensions caused by the 2005–2006 Thai political crisis.

Public support for the coup has been widely aired and published whilst public expression of opinion against the coup has been limited by the military control over the media, the ban on protests and political activity, and the arrest of some cabinet members by the junta. Protest has also arisen from both pro- and anti- Thaksin supporters and is directed against the use of military power to resolve a political stalemate. Protest is also limited following the king's endorsement of the coup and the junta's use of a royal decree that legitimizes the coup.

=== Reactions from the Thai Rak Thai and its supporters ===
With Thaksin and most of the Thai Rak Thai-party leaders in London and some of its top executives in detention, the reaction of the TRT was minimal. Several former party leaders believe the party will have to be dissolved. Former Khon Kaen MP Prajak Kaewklaharn said "When we have no leader and no executives, the party cannot continue"

A former TRT MP from Udon Thani, Thirachai Saenkaew, called for the junta to allow Thaksin to contest the next election. Thirachai claimed that TRT supporters wanted Thaksin to return to politics after the political reform. Theerachai said his constituents would still vote for Thaksin and his party at the next general election, saying that "Following the normalisation of the political situation, democratic rule should move forward in accordance with the voice of the people".

Former Sakon Nakhon MP Chalermchai Ulankul, a member of a faction allied with Suchart Tancharoen, a key TRT figure, said he and others might be unemployed for about a year. However, he said his group was "firm" and preparing to run in the election next year. "As long as the Thai Rak Thai Party is not dissolved, we can't say we will move to be under any other party. However, I don't know who will continue the TRT."

Nearly two weeks after the coup, TRT deputy leader Sontaya Kunplome and his 20-member faction resigned from the party. Somsak Thepsuthin, another TRT deputy leader said he and his Wan Nam Yom faction which has about 80 members would also submit their resignation. The move came after the CDR issued an order banning from political activities for five years all executive members of a party that has been dissolved. TRT is currently under investigation and could be dissolved for hiring smaller party during the April 2006 election.

On 2 October, Thaksin and former deputy prime minister Somkid Jatusipitak resigned from the TRT.

Reactions from grassroots supporters who lack political organisation were muted. A woman who benefited from Thaksin populist policies said "He gave me a chance to keep my daughter alive. He gave us food when we were in need. Now that he's been chased out, the poor have lost their closest friend.'"

=== Public support ===
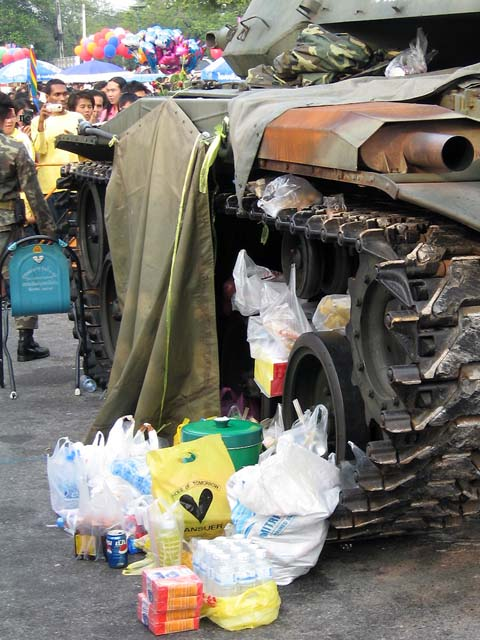
Food given by supporters of the coup stacking up near an armoured vehicle.

On 20 September 2006, Suan Dusit Rajabhat University published the result of a poll of 2,019 people. The results were that 84% supported the coup d'état, and 75% believe the coup will "improve politics". Only 5% believe the coup will make politics worse. This should be contrasted with a nationwide poll taken in July that found that 49% of the people would vote for the TRT in the cancelled October election. Starting 21 September, the junta ordered the media to stop publicizing the results of public opinion against the coup, which presumably included public opinion polls.

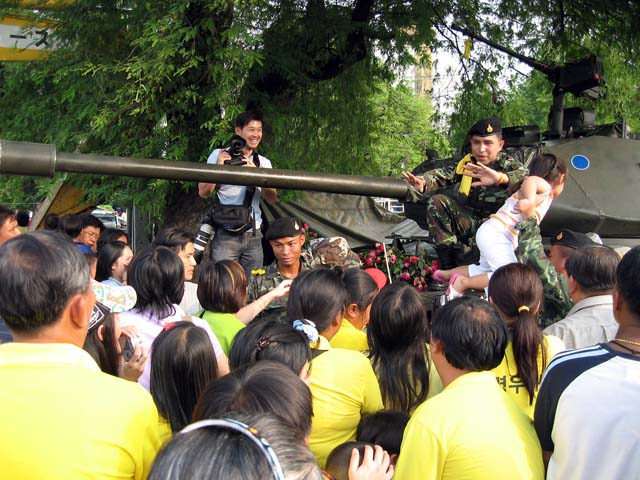
Soldier asking the crowd to move back as people wait to have picture of their children taken with him.

Soldiers were heartened by the warm public response. A soldier who agreed with the coup although he said it was not democratic said "I talked to people protesting against Thaksin Shinawatra who said they could do anything and would sacrifice their lives. If that happened—and officers had to suppress the chaos—the loss would be greater". He added, "We have our own democracy. We are all under His Majesty the King and people still have faith in the monarch. The military has a duty to protect the country, the religion and the King."

A group of lecturers and students from Rajamangala University of Technology Phra Nakhon briefly held a rally in front of army headquarters to urge their counterparts from Chulalongkorn and Thammasat Universities not to oppose to the coup. Many students from Chulalongkorn University supported the coup.

The Campaign for Popular Democracy, which coordinates 32 civic groups, six universities and 169 NGOs, came out in support of the coup, as did several politicians, including former Senator Kraisak Choonhavan. Kraisak, whose father Chatichai Choonhavan had been deposed in a coup in 1991, said, "This is the first coup where I don't have to watch my back."

A demonstration occurred in front of the UN Building in New York City in support of the coup.

=== Public disapproval ===
Former prime minister Chuan Leekpai said of the events, "As politicians, we do not support any kind of coup, but during the past five years, the government of Thaksin created several conditions that forced the military to stage the coup. Thaksin has caused the crisis in the country."

Anand Panyarachun, one of Thailand's most respected intellectuals, head of drafting committee of the 1997 constitution, and former coup-installed prime minister, noted his criticism of the coup in an interview with the Far Eastern Economic Review.

You have to remember that since 1992, we have had four general elections; we had peaceful transfers of power; we had governments who served full four-year terms. The military in 1992 had gone back to the barracks, and up to a few months ago there were no speculations and rumors about a possible coup. The armed forces, particularly the army, had gone back to the barracks and had become real professional soldiers. So to me what happened must be considered to be an extremely unfortunate dead-end street. So let's hope that there will be a new civilian government, fully engaged in some of the reform measures, including the revision of the present Constitution.

However, Anand later qualified his disapproval, by noting that "A coup d'état has a different meaning in the Thai context," and blaming the coup on Thaksin, "Over the past five years Thaksin and his party have become too powerful. They have consolidated their hold over the government machinery and certain sectors of the armed forces and parliament. So I think it's a more precarious situation."

Other prominent academics also voiced disapproval of the coup, including Pasuk Pongpaijitr, Chaiwat Satha-anand, and Giles Ungphakorn.

Leader of the Democrat Party Abhisit Vejjajiva voiced displeasure at the coup hours just before all political activities were banned:

We cannot and do not support any kind of extra-constitutional change, but it's done. The country has to move forward and the best way forward is for the coup leaders to quickly return power to the people and carry out reforms they promised. They have to prove themselves. I urge them to lift all restrictions as soon as possible. There is no need to write a brand new constitution. They could make changes to the 1997 constitution and if that's the case, there is no reason to take a year. Six months is a good time.

Other Democrat Party leaders, like Chuan Leekpai and Korn Chatikavanij expressed displeasure over the coup, but blamed Thaksin.

Several student groups also stated disapproval at the coup. Signs were set up and demonstrations organized to protest it. However, no unified multi-university statement of disapproval was made.

Reports on the numbers, extent and nature of public demonstrations against the coup and the military government are often contingent on national media whose freedom of speech is limited by the censure imposed by the CDRM. Organised local opposition to the coup was muted by a junta ban against assemblies of more than five persons. International protests against the coup were scattered, with anti-coup demonstrators protesting in front of the Thai Consulates in New York City and Seoul.

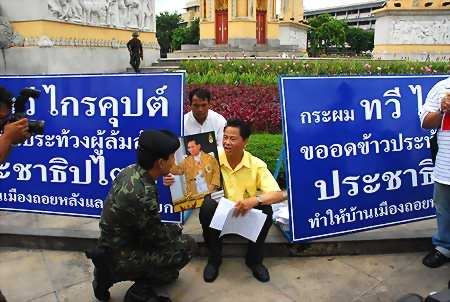
Hunger striker Thawee Kraikup before his arrest

==== Democracy Monument, 20 September ====
Activist Chalard Worachat and former MP Thawee Kraikup held a protest against the junta at the Democracy Monument the day after the coup. Thawee held up a sign saying "Fasting in Protest Against the Destroyer of Democracy." Military forces arrived soon afterwards and arrested Chalard at 12:30. Thawee refused to stop his protest and was arrested three hours later.

==== Siam Center, 22 September ====
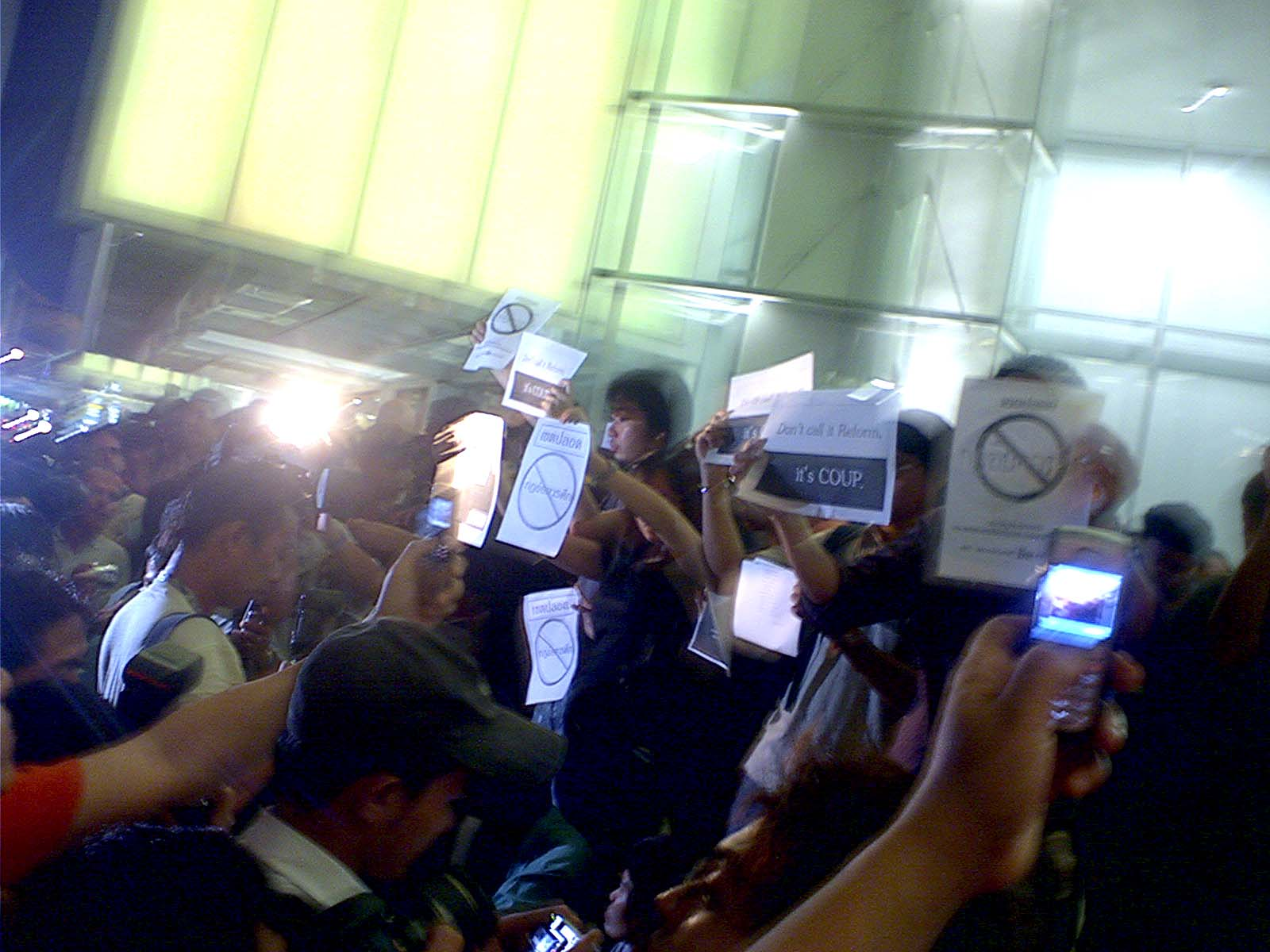
A group of protesters at Siam Square, 22 September 2006

The first public protest after the coup attracted between 20 and 100 protesters in front of Siam Center on the evening of 22 September 2006. Nobody was arrested, but police recorded the protest on video and noted that the tape would be examined to determine if protesters broke martial law. It is unknown whether the police or junta will arrest those it had recorded. Demonstrators wore black to mourn the death of democracy, and urged people who opposed the coup to also wear black. Protester Giles Ungphakorn noted, "We believe we speak for a significant number of Thais who are too worried or too afraid to speak." The protest was not reported on Thai television channels. The Independent reported that when the first protester, a female student, began reading out a statement, armed police forced their way through the crowd and grabbed her. A police officer jabbed a gun into her stomach and told her: "You're coming with us." The protesters tried to hold the woman back, but her fate is unknown.

==== Thammasat University, 25 September ====
The second public protest against the coup occurred on 25 September 2006 and attracted between 50 and 60 protesters and 200 spectators. It was held at 17:00 at Thammasat University. The protest included a political discussion on "Why we must resist the coup", and was organized by the "Dome Daeng (Red Dome)" group of Thammasat University, the "Chula Students for Liberty" group, and students from Mahidol, Ramkhamhaeng and Kasetsart universities and King Mongkut's Institute of Technology. "The choice in our world is not just between Thaksin or tanks," said Arunwana Sanitkawathee, a protesting Thammasat journalism student. The one-hour rally featured a banner mocking the "Council of Demented and Ridiculous Military". There were no uniformed police, but several intelligence officers were present and recorded the event on video.

==== Subsequent protests ====
Protests were also held at Chulalongkorn University on 27 September 2006. A protest was also held in Chiang Mai on 28 September 2006. On 2 October 2006, several dozen students and labor representatives demonstrated in front of army headquarters and burned the junta's Interim Constitution. On 6 October, the protest continued at Thammasat University and on 14 October, hundreds of protesters gathered around the Democracy Monument.

==== Democracy Monument, 10 December 2006 ====
Two thousand people dressed in black protested the coup on Constitution Day, 10 December 2006, at Sanam Luang and in front of the Democracy Monument. The group demanded the immediate revival of the 1997 constitution and a new election. Protestors included Weng Tojirakarn, Sant Hathirat and former senator Prateep Ungsongtham-Hata. Roadblocks were set up across the country to prevent protestors from heading to Bangkok. A group of 41 would-be protestors were stopped by police - their names were taken down and they were "encouraged" to head back home. A smaller group protested the coup and junta at Thammasat University.

==== Violent protests ====
At 06:00 on 30 September 2006, a taxi driver who had spray painted "[CDR is] destroying the country," and "Sacrificing life" onto his vehicle intentionally rammed it into a tank at the Royal Plaza. The driver, Nuamthong Praiwan, was severely injured and taken to a police station nearby. He later told reporters from a hospital bed that he wanted to protest the junta for damaging the country. His hooded body was later found hung from a pedestrian flyover. Officials ruled his death a suicide.

==== Petitions ====
An active on-line petition organized by Thongchai Winichakul, of the University of Wisconsin–Madison, was also set up at the PetitionOnline website to urge the junta not to arrest or harm protesters. Several influential figures have signed the petition so far, including Kasian Tejapira of Thammasat University, Viroj Na Ranong of the Thailand Development Research Institute, and Duncan McCargo of the University of Leeds.

=== Media ===
In an editorial, Bangkok's English-language broadsheet, The Nation, gave qualified support to the coup. It noted that "the likes of Thaksin should be rejected at the ballot box or through public pressure in the form of peaceful protests." However, under the circumstances in Thailand, it said the coup "may be a necessary evil."

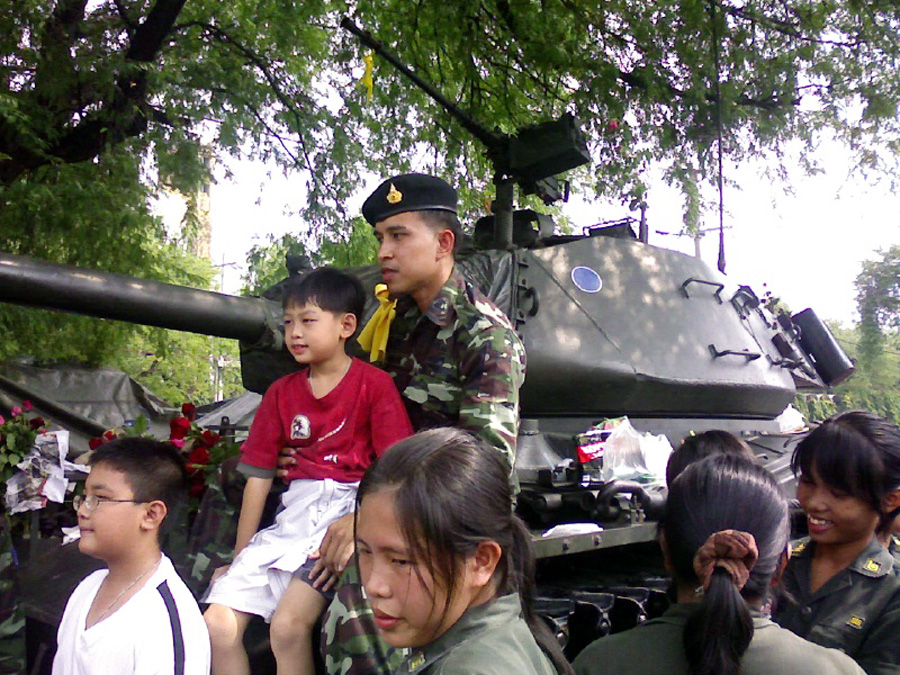
Bangkok Royal Thai Army

Thanaphol Eiwsakul, editor of Fah Diew Kan magazine (which had been censored by the Thaksin government), urged the public to resist the coup by exercising their right to protest coups as guaranteed by Article 65 of the 1997 constitution. He vowed to stage a protest on Thursday, 21 September 2006.

The Campaign for Popular Media Reform criticized the military for media censorship stationing soldiers outside media outlets. "Our standpoint is, we still believe that the military have no right, they should not give any order to shut down any media, even those [community] radio stations."

In a statement issued on 25 September, the Thai Journalists Association and the Broadcast Journalists Association did not condemn the coup, nor did it protest the junta's orders restricting freedom of the press. However, it urged the junta to transfer power back to the people as soon as possible and give the promised interim government a free hand to run the country. It also urged the junta to ensure that the promised constitution gave similar rights to the abrogated 1997 People's Constitution and also to allow the public to participate in its drafting, as the 1997 constitution was.

=== Human rights groups ===
Saneh Chamarik, chairman of the state National Human Rights Commission, stated in an interview, "I do not think [the coup] is about progression or regression [of democracy], but about problem solving." His remark was criticized by Suwit Lertkraimethi, an organizer of the 19 September Network against Coup d'Etat, who noted, "His role is to protect human rights, but his statement showed his approval of human-rights violations." Suwit demanded Saneh's resignation from the NHRC.

The Hong Kong-based Asian Human Rights Commission was critical of the coup. It called on the military to appoint a caretaker civilian government swiftly and on the United Nations General Assembly to condemn the coup. Later, the commission called for the junta to release the four cabinet members who the junta had arrested and detained without charges beyond the seven-day period allowed by Thai martial law provisions. In October the group set up a webpage contrasting commitments given by the coup group with what it had actually done.

New York-based Human Rights Watch was also critical of the coup, with Asia director Brad Adams saying "Thailand needs to solve its problems through the rule of law and the people exercising their right to choose their own leaders."

The Thailand Union for Civil Liberty was also critical of the coup. In a formal statement, it noted that the coup was destructive to the democratic system and would result in serious human rights infractions. The association demanded that the junta respect human rights, involve public participation to draft a constitution that protected human rights at least as well as the abrogated 1997 constitution, and hold speedy elections.

Amnesty International demanded that the junta must uphold human rights, saying that "No one should be penalised for their peaceful exercise of the rights of freedom of expression, association or assembly," and that the junta should "comply with Thailand's obligations under international human rights law."

On 25 September 20 academics and human right activists submitted a petition to the junta to request that they cancel restrictions that violate basic human rights. They also called for all sectors of the public to take part in the drafting of a new constitution.

=== Southern border provinces ===
Thailand's southern Muslims, who widely despised ousted Thaksin, said they hoped Muslim army commander and junta head General Sonthi Boonyaratglin would hold peace talks with separatist insurgents. Before the coup, Sonthi had suggested negotiations with insurgents, to much government criticism. However, up until 16 September, the army admitted it didn't know whom to negotiate with.

After a brief lull, violence resumed two days after the coup, when two villagers were shot in Yala. On 23 September four policemen were injured in a bus stop bombing on a road to be travelled by Crown Prince Vajiralongkorn later that afternoon. Then on 25 September, two police stations and a military outpost were attacked by 30 gunmen in a coordinated series of attacks.

== International reactions ==
=== Diplomatic reactions ===
Reactions to the coup outside Thailand were generally negative. Many organizations and countries expressed their concern about the situation and hoped for a peaceful resolution. Some countries advised recent travelers to Thailand to be alert due to safety concerns. International government statements concerning the coup ranged from harsh denunciations to non-interference.

The United States said "There's no justification for a military coup in Thailand or in anyplace else, and we certainly are extremely disappointed by this action." It later noted that it would like to see elections held earlier than the one-year timetable set by the coup leaders. The United States later cut off US$24 million in military aid although funding for humanitarian purposes would continue.

United Nations Secretary-General Kofi Annan noted that "I don't have the details but this is not a practice to be encouraged." He also said, "As the African Union, for example, has indicated, they do not support those who come to power through the barrel of a gun." The UN High Commissioner for Human Rights later noted that the coup contravened human rights conventions and urged the junta to "ensure respect for human rights and fundamental freedoms and reinstate the country's human rights commission."

=== International media responses ===
Several international publications condemned the coup. The Economist noted that the coup would not solve any problems, that its purpose was to prevent an election victory by the Thai Rak Thai Party, and that it undid a decade's worth of democratic progress. It also noted how the general lack of international condemnation for the coup might embolden military leaders or reinforce authoritative tendencies in neighbouring countries. The New York Times also criticized the coup, noting that Thailand, a former exemplary leader of democracy, was now sidestepping constitutional processes to achieve political ends.

== Aftermath ==
=== Stock exchange ===
Thai stocks fell to two-month lows before recovering in the first day of trading since the coup. Shares of Shin Corporation and its units declined. The SET Index dropped 9.99, or 1.4 percent, to 692.57 at the 16:30 close in Bangkok. About six stocks fell for every one that rose at the exchange, with 43 billion baht (US$1.1 billion) changing hands. That was the most since 51 billion baht in shares traded on 5 April, the day after Thaksin said he would step down to end a political crisis. The SET rose 3.1 percent that day.

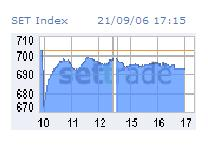

The SET Index fell 29.64 points, or 4.2 percent to 702.63 in the first minutes of trading on 21 September to its lowest intraday level since 21 July. But quickly bounced back, suggesting the coup would do no greater damage. Merrill Lynch said "This time investors should be encouraged by the fact that the uncertainty surrounding Thaksin's tenure has been removed." and kept its "overweight" rating on Thai stocks. Foreign Institutions with JPM leading was valued at 7,393 million baht (US$200 million) in this day. After the previous coup, in February 1991, the SET tumbled 7.3 percent on the first day of trading before rallying 24 percent in the next two months.

=== Currency ===
The Thai baht experienced its biggest loss in almost three years after the military seized control of Bangkok and Thaksin declared a state of emergency. The baht fell 1.3 percent to 37.77 per dollar at 17:06 in New York, from 37.29 late on 18 September, the biggest decline since 14 October 2003. The baht trimmed losses after falling by as much as 1.8 percent on speculation King Bhumibol Adulyadej would resolve the crisis.

The baht rebounded in the following day as investors bet the coup would break a political deadlock that had stalled public works spending. The currency rose the most in more than eight months. The baht rose 1 percent to 37.38 per dollar at 14:30 in Bangkok. "This represents a buying opportunity as it removes the political roadblock from the economy," said Richard Yetsenga, a currency strategist at HSBC Holdings Plc in Hong Kong. "The coup is as calm as you could possibly expect."

== See also ==
- 1973 Thai popular uprising
- 1976 Thammasat University massacre
- 1991 Thai coup d'état
- 2005–06 Thai political crisis
- Public opinion of the 2006 Thai coup d'état
- 2008 Thai political crisis
- 2009 Thai political unrest
- 2013–14 Thai political crisis
- 2014 Thai coup d'état
