= Thawinan Khongkran =

Thai beauty contest winner

Thawinan Khongkran (born 1964) is a Thai beauty contest winner. She was Miss University of Asia 1986 and Miss Asia 1987.

She works as Head of Public Relations for the Royal Thai Army-run Channel 5 Television. She came to prominence in English-speaking media for her public relations for the army in the 2006 Thailand coup d'état.

In an interview with the Associated Press she said she considered her work with military relations an honor. She has also been accused of attempting to soften the junta's image.
