= Ruangroj Mahasaranon =

Thai army officer

Ruangroj Mahasaranond
- เรืองโรจน์ มหาศรานนท์
- Born: 28 March 1946 (age 80); Bangkok, Thailand
- Military career
- Allegiance: Thailand
- Branch: Royal Thai Army
- Rank: General
- Commands: Supreme Commander

General Ruangroj Mahasaranon (born 28 March 1946; Thai: เรืองโรจน์ มหาศรานนท์) is a retired Thai army officer. From 2005 to 2006, he was the Supreme Commander of the Headquarters of the Royal Thai Armed Forces. Following the 2006 Thailand coup d'état, the ousted prime minister, Thaksin Shinawatra, attempted to put Ruangroj in power until Thaksin returned. However, Ruangroj was later named the chief advisor to the Council for Democratic Reform (CDR). In August 2006, Ruangroj visited the junta leader, Than Shwe, in Myanmar, ostensibly to discuss border issues.

In August 2007, he surprised everyone – especially the junta – by his new political career as one of vice-leaders of People's Power Party.

Preceded by New Position	Chief Advisor to the Council for Democratic Reform (CDR); September 20, 2006—September 29, 2006	Succeeded by Incumbent
Preceded by Gen. Chaiyasit Shinawatra	Supreme Commander of the Royal Thai Armed Forces; October 1, 2005—September 30, 2006	Succeeded by Gen. Boonsrang Naimpradit
