= Banjerd Singkaneti =

Thai legal scholar

Banjerd Singkaneti (Thai: บรรเจิด สิงคะเนติ; RTGS: Banchoet Singkhaneti) (born, 11 February 1964) is a Thai legal scholar, a lecturer of law at Thammasat University and a noted critic of Thai Prime Minister Thaksin Shinawatra.

== Education and early career ==
Banjerd completed an LL.B. at Bangkok's Ramkhamhaeng University. He received an LL.M. in public law from Thammasat University, followed by a Magister Legum (LL.M.) Doktors der Rechte (Dr.jur.) from Ruhr-Universität Bochum in Germany. He returned to Thailand after completing his doctorate and now teaches administrative law and constitutional law at Thammasat University.

== Criticism of Thaksin Shinawatra ==
Banjerd was a leader of the People's Alliance for Democracy, a group active in 2006 which attempted to bring down the government of Prime Minister Thaksin Shinawatra. He famously criticized Thaksin as being even worse than Nazi dictator Adolf Hitler.

What makes Mr. Thaksin different from Adolf Hitler was that Hitler did not do things for his own benefit. Hitler killed Jews, but he did several things for his country. He was more useful for the country than Mr Thaksin ever was.

The Embassy of Israel protested in a letter to the Bangkok Post, the English-language newspaper which published Banjerd's statement.

Comparing Thaksin to Hitler shows ignorance or lack of knowledge of history. After World War Two, it took years for many countries to recover from the devastation caused by the Nazis. Several others have not yet recovered. It is also to ignore the actual fact that millions of people were murdered and suffered under the hands of the Nazi regime. There is no similarity between Hitler’s dictatorship leading his country to World War Two, and Thaksinomics.

== Assect Examination Committee ==
After a military coup overthrew the government of Thaksin in a coup, the junta appointed Banjerd to the Asset Exemination Committee to investigate allegations of corruption against Thaksin. He was also appointed to the Constitution Drafting Committee prepare a new constitution.

During the drafting process, Banjerd said in an interview:

I personally believe in social structure and administration through traditions and customs that we once had in small communities. It’s more real than western-style democracy because people rule by themselves. I firmly believe that we really need to look back into our village life.
