= Chalard Worachat =

Thai activist (1943–2021)

Chalard Worachat (Thai: ฉลาด วรฉัตร, RTGS: Chalat Worachat; 31 July 1943 – 12 December 2021) was a Thai politician and activist. He was a member of parliament for the Democrat Party from 1979 to 1983 and 1986 to 1987.

His 1992 hunger strike helped bring down the military-backed government of Suchinda Kraprayoon in the Black May. His 1994 hunger strike forced the government of Chuan Leekpai to establish a committee to amend the constitution of Thailand. Following the 2006 Thailand coup d'état, he was arrested by military troops for protesting.

In the wake of the 2014 Thai coup d'état, the 71-year-old was back living on water and honey, due to another hunger strike protest by him.

== Early life ==
Worachat was born on 31 July 1943 in Trat Province. He graduated with a bachelor's degree in engineering from Adamson University.

== Political movement ==
Worachat had previously been a member of the House of Representatives (Trat MP) under the Democrat Party for the 1979 elections in Bangkok and the Bangkok MP in the 1986 election and used to be the deputy leader of the mass party by protesting to starve until it is well known. On 8 April 1992, Worachat announced a fasting protest in front of Parliament until Prime Minister Suchinda Kraprayoon resigned, but was not well received by the government. He was regarded as the first famous person to oppose the government at that time openly. Worachat returned to starving again after the 19 September 2006 coup to protest the seizure of power and continuously by locking himself in a cage in front of the parliament to protest the 2007 constitution of Thailand.

Worachat fasted in front of the Parliament building again since 22 May 2014 to combat the use of martial law as well as military coup actions.

On 10 June 2014, at the Criminal Court he filed a lawsuit against General Prayut Chan-o-cha, leader of the National Council for Peace and Order (NCPO), together with the Permanent Secretary of the Ministry and the Presidency of the Statute, totaling 27 people, for offenses against the King and the rebels from the case of declaring martial law and seizing power to govern the country.

Worachat said if martial law was declared the country must be at war or violent and must be announced only in the area where the event occurred and must also seek approval from the Cabinet and Royal Command but the military violated power. If after this, the NCPO is called to report would not go according to that, but would not escape arresting the National Assembly.

== Later life and death ==
On 6 July 2014, Worachat announced the end of the fasting protests due to health problems.

He died on 12 December 2021, at the age of 78.
