= Chris Baker (writer) =

Thailand-based British writer (born 1948)

- Born: Christopher John Baker; 3 January 1948 (age 78)
- Occupation: Writer
- Spouse: Pasuk Phongpaichit

Christopher John Baker (born 3 January 1948) is a Thailand-based British writer who has made his home in Bangkok for more than 30 years. He began his scholarly career as a historian of colonial south India at the University of Cambridge. He is the co-author of A History of Thailand, Thaksin: The Business of Politics in Thailand, Thailand's Boom and Bust, and Thailand's Crisis, all written with his wife, Dr. Pasuk Phongpaichit. He was the principal writer of the United Nations Development Programme's Thailand Human Development Report 2007: Sufficiency Economy and Human Development, which praised King Bhumibol Adulyadej's self-sufficient economy theory.

In 2010, Chris Baker and his wife Pasuk Phongpaichit published a compilation and translation of the Thai epic poem Khun Chang Khun Phaen. The epic was published in a two volume set, which arranged the story in a narrative form suitable for modern English readers. Copious footnotes and creative illustrations are also included. They have also published a version of their compilation in Thai.

Baker was the recipient of the 2017 Fukuoka Prize together with his spouse and collaborator, Pasuk Phongpaichit. The prize is awarded annually to those who have made outstanding contributions to academia, arts, and culture in Asia.

Baker is a writer and editor of the Journal of the Siam Society.

== Selected works ==
- South India: Political Institutions and Political Change, 1880-1940. Delhi, Macmillan. 1975. (co-authored with David Washbrook).
- The Politics of South India, 1920-37. Cambridge, Cambridge University Press. 1976.
- An Indian Rural Economy, 1880-1955: The Tamil Nadu Countryside. Oxford: Oxford University Press. 1985.
- Thailand: Economy and Politics. Kuala Lumpur: Oxford University Press, 1995. Also in Thai. Revised edition, 2002. (co-authored with Pasuk Phongpaichit)
- Thailand's Boom and Bust. Chiang Mai: Silkworm Books. 1998. (co-authored with Pasuk Phongpaichit). ISBN 978-974-7100-57-0
- Thailand's Crisis. Institute of Southeast Asian Studies, 2000. (co-authored with Pasuk Phongpaichit). ISBN 978-981-230-091-1
- Thaksin: The Business of Politics in Thailand. Chiang Mai: Silkworm Books. 2004. (co-authored with Pasuk Phongpaichit). ISBN 978-974-9575-55-0
- A History of Thailand. Cambridge: Cambridge University Press. 2005. (co-authored with Pasuk Phongpaichit). ISBN 978-0-521-01647-6
- Thai Capitalism after the 1997 Crisis. Chiang Mai: Silkworm Books, 2008. (co-edited with Pasuk Phongpaichit).
- "The 2014 Thai Coup and Some Roots of Authoritarianism". Journal of Contemporary Asia. 46 (3): 388–404. 2016.
- A History of Ayutthaya: Siam in the Early Modern World. Cambridge: Cambridge University Press, 2017. (co-authored with Pasuk Phongpaichit). ISBN 978-1-108-12283-2
