= 19 September Network against Coup d'Etat =

Thai activist group

The 19 September Network against Coup d'État is a Thai activist group organized to protest the 2006 Thailand coup d'état.

According to Sombat Ngamboon-anong, who registered the 19sep.org domain, The Network's website, 19sept.org was shut down by the hosting service on orders of the Thai Information and Communications Technology Ministry.

The group organized a petition signing at the Siam Paragon shopping center in Bangkok at 18.00 Friday 22 September 2006. The Student Activity Information Resource, led by Chotisak On-soong took part in the petition signing.

The group planned to hold a public hearing in protest against martial law on 18 November 2006 at Thammasat University. After the public hearing, the group planned to parade from the university to the Democracy Monument, and then proceed to Army Headquarters.
