= Thitinan Pongsudhirak =

Thai political scientist

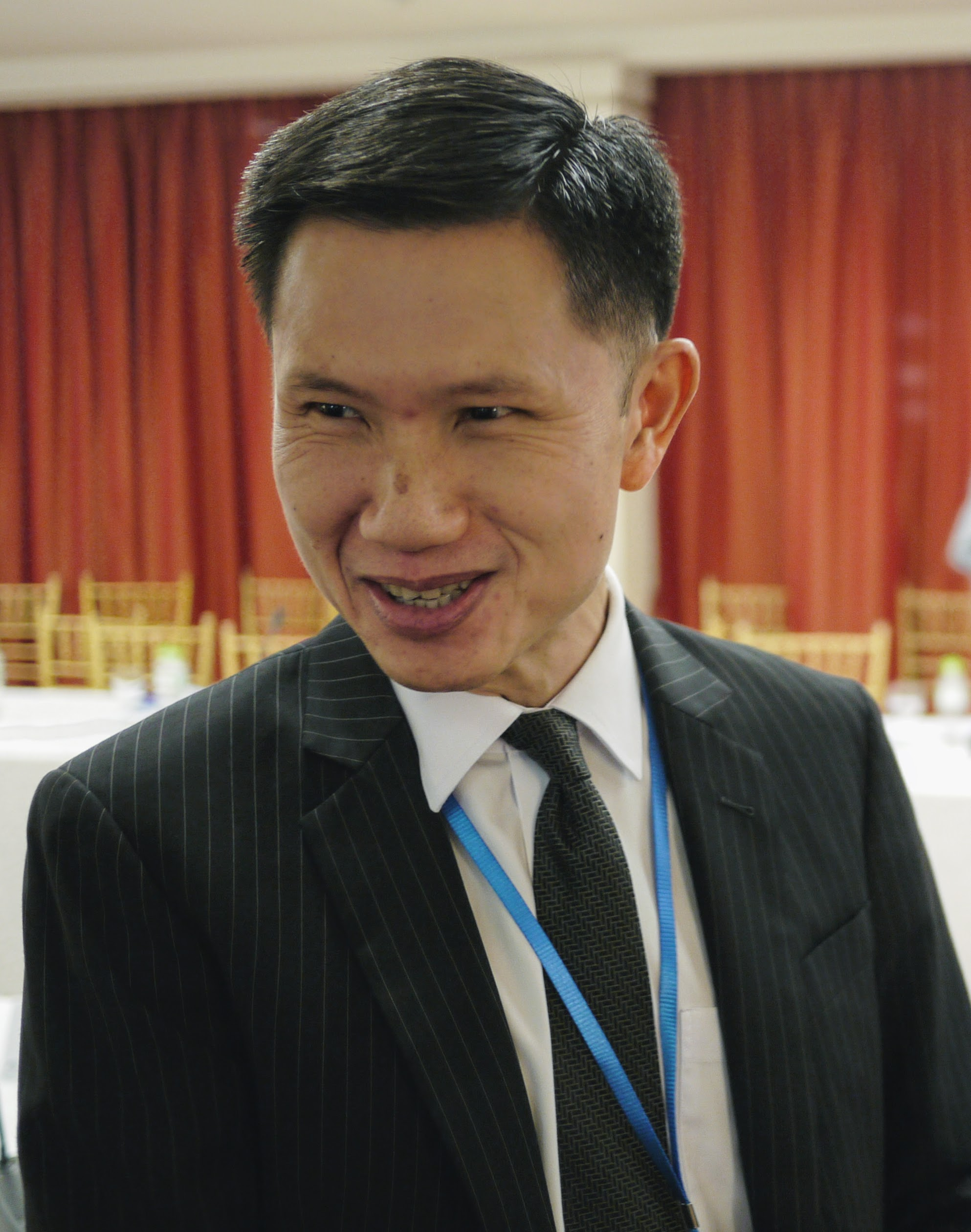
Pongsudhirak at a conference in 2017.

Thitinan Pongsudhirak (Thai: ฐิตินันท์ พงษ์สุทธิรักษ์, RTGS: Thitinan Phongsutthirak) is a Thai political scientist, speaker and Professor of International Relations at Faculty of Political Science, Chulalongkorn University in Bangkok, where he is the Director of the Institute for Science and International Security (ISIS), Faculty of Political Science.

He received his Ph.D. (International Relations) from the London School of Economics (LSE), an M.A. from the School of Advanced International Studies (SAIS) of the Johns Hopkins University, and a B.A. from the University of California, Santa Barbara.

He was formerly Deputy Dean for International Affairs at the Faculty of Political Science of Chulalongkorn University. From 1998 to 2005, he has worked for Economist Intelligence Unit. He was a visiting fellow at Stanford Humanity Center, Stanford University in 2010.
