= Pasuk Phongpaichit =

Thai economist (born 1946)

- Born: 11 February 1946 (age 80)
- Spouse: Chris Baker

Academic work
- Institutions: Chulalongkorn University

Pasuk Phongpaichit (Thai: ผาสุก พงษ์ไพจิตร, RTGS: Phasuk Phongphaichit, born 11 February 1946) is a Thai economist and historian. A professor at Chulalongkorn University, she is the author of several books on corruption in Thailand.

Pasuk earned BA and MA degrees in economics at Monash University in Australia, and received her PhD at Cambridge University in England. Her books include A History of Thailand, Thaksin: The Business of Politics in Thailand, and Thailand's Crisis (with Chris Baker), and Guns, Girls, Gambling, Ganja (with Sungsidh Piriyarangsan and Nualnoi Treerat).

A critic of former premier Thaksin Shinawatra, she was appointed an advisor to the military junta that overthrew his government, but declined the position.

Pasuk was the recipient of the 2017 Fukuoka Prize together with her spouse and collaborator, Chris Baker. The prize is awarded annually to those who have made outstanding contributions to academia, arts, and culture in Asia.

== Selected works in English ==
- Rural women of Thailand: From Peasant Girls to Bangkok Masseuses. Geneva: ILO, 1980. (Also available in Japanese, 1991). Fourth impression, 1988.
- The Informal Sector in Thai Economic Development. Tokyo: Institute of Developing Economies, 1992 (Also available in Japanese, 1993). (co-edited with Shigeru Itoga).
- Thailand: Economy and Politics. Kuala Lumpur: Oxford University Press, 1995. Reprint 1997, 1999. Also in Thai. Rev ed, 2002. (co-authored with Chris Baker)
- Corruption and Democracy in Thailand. Bangkok: Political Economy Centre, Chulalongkorn University, 1994; 2nd ed by Silkworm Books, Chiang Mai, Thailand 1996. (co-authored with Sungsidh Piriyarangsan)
- Guns, Girls, Gambling, Ganja: Thailand's Illegal Economy and Public Policy. Chiang Mai: Silkworm Books, and Washington University Press, 1998. (co-authored with Sungsidh Piriyarangsan and Nualnoi Treerat)
- Thailand's Boom and Bust. Chiang Mai: Silkworm Books. 1998. (co-authored with Chris Baker) ISBN 978-974-7100-57-0
- Thailand's Crisis. Institute of Southeast Asian Studies, 2000. (co-authored with Chris Baker) ISBN 978-981-230-091-1
- Thaksin: The Business of Politics in Thailand. Chiang Mai: Silkworm Books. 2004. (co-authored with Chris Baker) ISBN 978-974-9575-55-0
- A History of Thailand. Cambridge: Cambridge University Press. 2005. (co-authored with Chris Baker) ISBN 978-0-521-01647-6
- Thai Capitalism after the 1997 Crisis. Chiang Mai: Silkworm Books, 2008. (co-edited with Chris Baker)
- Thaksin (2nd ed.). Chiang Mai: Silkworm Books. 2009 (co-authored with Chris Baker) ISBN 978-1-63102-400-9
- A History of Ayutthaya: Siam in the Early Modern World. Cambridge: Cambridge University Press, 2017. (co-authored with Chris Baker)
- From the Fifty Jataka: Selections from the Thai Pannasa Jataka. Chiang Mai: Silkworm Books, 2019. (co-authored with Chris Baker)
