= Council for National Security =

Military government of Thailand following the 2006 coup

- คณะมนตรีความมั่นคงแห่งชาติ
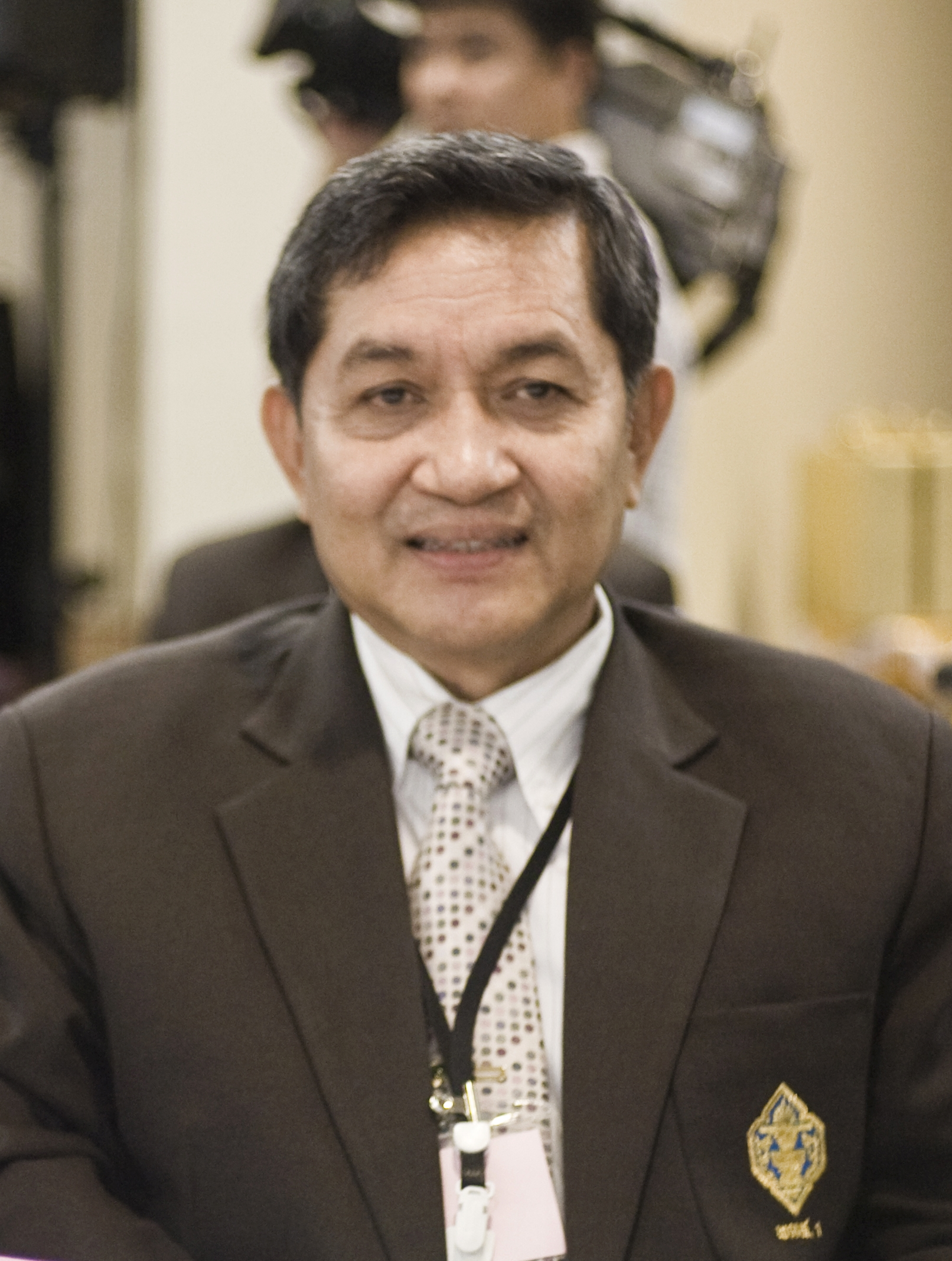
- Sonthi Boonyaratglin in August 2009
- Formation: 19 September 2006
- Dissolved: 7 February 2008
- Type: Military junta
- Appointer: King Bhumibol Adulyadej
- President: Sonthi Boonyaratglin (2006–2007); Chalit Pukbhasuk (acting)
- Key people: Sathiraphan Keyanon Deputy; Chalit Pukbhasuk Deputy; Kowit Wattana Deputy; Winai Phatthiyakul Secretary

The Council for National Security (Thai: คณะมนตรีความมั่นคงแห่งชาติ; RTGS: Khana Montri Khwam Man Khong Haeng Chat); abbreviated CNS (Thai: คมช.), was the military junta that ruled Thailand between its coup d'état against Prime Minister Thaksin Shinawatra on 19 September 2006 until the later coup d'état on 22 May 2014. Thaksin was deposed while overseas in New York City in a nonviolent coup led by Royal Thai Army (RTA) Commander General Sonthi Boonyaratglin, one of Thailand's top military commanders. Martial law was declared on 19 September by General Sonthi, who stated that the action was taken in an effort to "bring back normality and harmony" and with the intent to "return power to the Thai people as soon as possible." This sentiment was echoed by King Bhumibol Adulyadej, who subsequently appointed General Sonthi to lead the governing council.

General Sonthi led the Council, acting as both the prime minister and the cabinet, until the appointment of General Surayud Chulanont as the new prime minister. However, the Council retained considerable political power under the Council-drafted 2006 Interim Constitution, especially concerning the drafting of a permanent constitution.

The Council was dissolved on 22 May 2014 upon the partial repeal of the 2007 Constitution of Thailand, when Army Commander General Prayut Chan-o-cha launched a coup d'état in response to six months of political crisis. It was succeeded in its capacity as military junta by the National Council for Peace and Order.

== Name ==
The Council was originally formed as the Council for Democratic Reform (Thai: คณะปฏิรูปการปกครองในระบอบประชาธิปไตยอันมีพระมหากษัตริย์ทรงเป็นประมุข; RTGS: Khana Patirup Kanpokhrong Nai Rabop Prachathippatai An Mi Phramahakasat Songpenpramuk), abbreviated to CDR (Thai: คปค.). The Council's original Thai name translates literally to "Council for Reforming the Democratic Regime of Government with the King as Head". On 21 September 2006, a spokesperson requested the local media to report the Council's English name in full, rather than shortening it, along with the addendum "under the Constitutional Monarchy" after news reports had been shortening the name in their coverage. This was because the Council felt that its full name was significant to relaying its intended message, and that the shortened version may be "misleading".

However, on September 27, the Council announced that they would be dropping the English reference to the monarchy due to misunderstandings arising by foreign media concerning the role the monarchy played in the Council, and declared that it would officially be known as the Council for Democratic Reform in English. When the 2006 interim constitution was released that same day, ahead of its promulgation on October 1, it included articles creating a Council for National Security with an identical leadership to that of the CDR, effectively re-naming the CDR to the Council for National Security once the interim constitution came into effect.

== Membership and key positions ==
Sonthi received the appointment and blessing of king Bhumibol Adulyadej, who is quoted as saying, "So as to maintain peace and order in the nation, His Majesty the King has graciously granted a Royal Command appointing General Sonthi Boonyaratglin as Leader of the Council for Democratic Reform. The people is requested to remain calm while all public servants are to follow Orders issued by General Sonthi Boonyaratglin, henceforth onwards." The junta consists of the leaders of all branches of the Thai military and police:

Office	Name	Branch	Position	Note
Chief	Sonthi Boonyaratglin	Royal Thai Army	Commander-in-Chief	
First Deputy Chief	Sathiraphan Keyanon	Royal Thai Navy	Commander-in-Chief	
Second Deputy Chief	Chalit Pookpasuk	Royal Thai Air Force	Commander-in-Chief	
Third Deputy Chief	Kowit Wattana	Royal Thai Police	Commissioner-General	Ousted from both his Police Commissioner-General and his junta leadership position on 5 February 2007, due to his investigation of junta involvement in the 2007 Bangkok bombings.
Secretary-General	Winai Phatthiyakul	Royal Thai Army	National Security Council Secretary-General	
Chief Adviser	Ruangroj Mahasaranon	Royal Thai Armed Forces Headquarters	Supreme Commander	

A week after the coup, Sonthi's former classmate Gen Boonsrang Naimpradit was promoted from Deputy Supreme Commander to the post of Supreme Commander, replacing Ruangroj Mahasaranon. Junta Secretary General, Winai Phattiyakul, was promoted to the post of Permanent Secretary for Defence.

Gen Sonthi also promoted his classmates and lieutenants in the coup, 1st Army Region Commander Lt-Gen Anupong Paochinda and 3rd Army Region Commander Lt-Gen Saprang Kalayanamitr, to the post of Assistant Army Commander.

On 22 September, the Council gave Police General Kowit Wattana absolute power over all police matters. He was also made chair of a new National Police Commission, the membership of which had not yet been announced. The Commission will be assigned to amend the 2004 National Police Bill over the next year; the bill had originally been approved by the elected parliament. Under the pre-coup legal framework, the Premier had been responsible for Chairing the Commission.

A later restructuring reflected power shifts among the junta, particularly an increase in the power of the army and a decrease in the power of the police and navy. Police chief Kowit Watana, who, after the coup, had reshuffle senior police personnel to weaken the power base of Thaksin Shinawatra, was demoted from junta Deputy Chief to merely a member. Navy Commander Admiral Sathiraphan Keyanond, who had been second in command of the junta, was also demoted to being merely a member.

== Political motivations and objectives ==
In a statement on 21 September, the Council stated its reasons for taking power, and gave a commitment to restore democratic government within one year. The statement described the coup as a “brief intervention in order to restore peace, unity, and justice in the country.”

The reasons given for the coup were:

*Erosion of faith on the national administration and impasse of political differences

- Drastic increase in disunity among the Thai people
- Signs of rampant corruption, malfeasance and widespread nepotism
- Inability to proceed with the reform process as intended by the Constitution
- Interference in national independent agencies, crippling their ability to function properly and to effectively solve the nation’s problems
- Certain substantive democratic elements in the Constitution have been undermined
- Deterioration of social justice
- Evidence of words and actions which have shaken and proven to be against the very foundation of Thailand’s democracy with His Majesty the King as Head of State

The statement continued: “The Council’s intervention has no other aim than to strengthen democracy through democratic reforms, including the holding of generally-accepted free and fair elections. Leaving the country under protracted political uncertainty, on the other hand, would eventually erode people’s trust and confidence in the very foundations of democracy.”

The 2006 coup was followed by increased divisiveness in Thai society, leading to many more lese majeste cases despite the king's expressed wish that these be decreased. By late 2011, the United Nations and United States and other western countries had expressed extreme concerns over the lese majeste laws and lack of protection of human rights in the kingdom.

== Decisions and future ==
The junta pledged to appoint a civilian government, step aside, reinstate human rights, hold elections within a year, and not change key Thaksin-government policies like universal healthcare and microcredit village funds. The junta later appointed retired General Surayud Chulanont as Premier, changed its name to the Council for National Security and institutionalized its power in the Interim Constitution, lifted their ban on political gatherings (but only for “constructive debates”), and moved the date of elections to 17 months.

In recent years, Thailand’s political landscape has seen significant changes. The Move Forward Party (MFP) and Pheu Thai Party have emerged as major political forces. In the 2023 elections, the MFP claimed victory, signaling a shift away from military-backed rule. However, challenges remain, including potential legal hurdles and the influence of the military and royalist establishment.

=== Timeline for establishment of civilian government ===
The Council’s statement included a timetable for the restoration of civilian government and elections. “A provisional constitution will be in place within two weeks, and eventually a civilian government will be formed,” it said. “The mechanisms for democratic reform will soon be reinstated. A legislative body, responsible for legislation and the drafting of the new constitution, will be established. This process, which will lead to general elections, should be completed within one year. See Thailand 2006 interim civilian government

Following the general election the junta would be dissolved and replaced by a Council of National Security "It's necessary to keep the council so that there is no loophole for the executive branch", General Sonthi Boonyaratglin told AFP

=== Removal from the civil service ===
The junta initiated the removal from the civil service of people appointed by the Thaksin government as well as Thaksin's former Class 10 classmates at the Armed Forces Academies Preparatory School. Military officers to be transferred to inactive posts included assistant army chief Gen Pornchai Kranlert, First Army Corps commander Lt-Gen Jirasit Kesakomol, First Army Division chief Maj-Gen Prin Suwandhat, Commander of the First Army Area Lt General Anupong Paochinda, Maj General Prin Suwanathat, Lt General Jirasit Kesakomol, Maj General Ruangsak Thongdee, Maj General Sanit Phrommas, and Maj General Manas Paorik. General Lertrat Rattavanich, seen as close to the Thaksin government, was promoted to a ceremonial post of Defence Inspector General.

Labor Ministry Permanent Secretary Somchai Wongsawat, brother-in-law of Thaksin Shinawatra, was arrested and is being detained on the second floor of the Army Headquarters building.

Also transferred were 18 senior police officers which the junta claimed could pose a threat to national security if they were to remain in their current posts. These included Special Branch Police chief Pol Lt-Gen Thaworn Chanyim, Immigration Police chief Pol Lt-Gen Suwat Thamrongsrisakul, Region 4 chief Pol Lt-Gen Sathaporn Duangkaew, Central Investigation Bureau chief Pol Lt-Gen Montri Chamroon, Crime Suppression Division chief Pol Maj-Gen Winai Thongsong, 191 Police chief Pol Maj-Gen Sumeth Ruangsawat, Metropolitan Police Division 5 chief Pol Maj-Gen Kosin Hinthao, Metropolitan Police Division 7 chief Pol Maj-Gen Boonsong Panichattra, and Special Branch Police Division 3 chief Pol Maj-Gen Atthakrit Thareechat. Pol Maj-Gen Atthakrit Thareechat is currently providing security for Thaksin in London.

Surasit Sangkhapong, director of the Government Lottery Office and an aide of Thaksin resigned to allow Auditor-General Jaruvan Maintaka to conduct an investigation into an allegation of irregularity.

Governors of provinces seen as Thai Rak Thai political strongholds transferred to smaller provinces or appointed to the inactive posts in the Interior Ministry. This included the governors of Chiang Mai, Chiang Rai, Khon Kaen, Buri Ram, Phatthalung, Satun, Surin, Kamphaeng Phet, Sukhothai, and Samut Prakan. Interior Minister Aree Wongarya denied that the moves were politically motivated. However, the reshuffle was widely seen as an attempt to demote those with links to the deposed government. Interior Ministry permanent secretary Phongphayome Wasaphooti also noted that the transfers were done in order to "reduce the influences attached to their Thai Rak Thai-initiated CEO governorships. The transfers are aimed at enabling the [Surayud] government to function more easily."

Many senior government officials were transferred by the junta "for the sake of achieving reconciliation", meaning that they were alleged to have had links to the deposed regime. 10 senior officials at the National Park, Wildlife and Plant Conservation Department were transferred.

=== Appointment of advisors ===
The junta ordered 58 prominent civilians to serve as its advisers. However, most of the appointees denied any knowledge of the appointments, with some saying they couldn't serve. "I have said that the coup is wrong, how can I serve as its advisory board?" asked Chaiwat Satha-anand of the Faculty of Political Science of Chulalongkorn University. Pratheep Ungsongtham Hata, who was appointed to the reconciliation panel, also boycotted the CDR's advisory board, noting that as a democracy advocate, she could not work with the CDR, which took by unconstitutional means. Pibhob Dhongchai, a leader of the defunct anti-Thaksin People's Alliance for Democracy, said he could not participate in the reconciliation panel because he was a member of the National Economic and Social Advisory Council, and already had a channel to advise the government.

Pasuk Pongpaichit, an anti-Thaksin economist who had also been appointed, denied that she could not serve as an advisor, using as her excuse an impending extended trip to Japan. When asked by the press why the junta had not informed the appointees of their appointments, the CDR spokesman Lt-Gen Palangoon Klaharn said: "It is not necessary. Some matters are urgent. It is an honour to help the country. I believe that those who have been named will not reject the appointment because we haven't damaged their reputation."

Advisors were appointed in 4 key areas:

- Economics. Headed by Bank of Thailand Governor Pridiyathorn Devakula, this group had 19 members, including Ammar Siamwalla and Chalongphob Susangkarn (Thailand Development Research Institute), Kosit Pampiemras (Bangkok Bank), Khunying Jada Wattanasiritham (Siam Commercial Bank), Piyasvasti Amranand (Kasikorn Asset Management), Pasuk Phongpaichit (Chulalongkorn University), Ajva Taulananda (Charoen Pokphand), Veerathai Santipraphop, and Sivaporn Darandaranda.
- Ethics, good governance, corruption prevention. Headed by the National Institute of Development Administration's Churee Wichitwathakan, this group had 13 members, including Dejudom Krairit, Sungsidh Piriyarangsan and Suraphol Nitikraipot.
- Reconciliation and justice. Headed by Community Organizations Development Institute Chairpman Phaibool Wattanasiritham, this group had 26 members, including Gothom Arya, Chaiwat Sathaanand, Theeraphat Serirangsan, Pipob Thongchai, Pratheep Ungsongtham Hata, Srisak Valiphodom, Urichai Wangkaew and Sophon Supaphong.
- Foreign affairs. Headed by former Permanent Secretary of the Foreign Ministry Vitaya Vejjajiva and made up of former diplomats including Tej Bunnag, Krit Karnchana-kunchorn, Nitya Pibulsonggram and Phisarn Manawaphat.

=== Investigation of the deposed government ===
The junta assigned several agencies to investigate the deposed government.

- An Assets Examination Committee, established to investigate corruption allegations involving projects approved by the deposed government, including the CTX bomb-scanner controversy. Jaruvan Maintaka, Auditor-General, threatened to resign from the Committee if it did not investigate all cases of alleged irregularity, including the personal wealth of former Cabinet ministers as well as "policy corruption", where policies were approved to allegedly benefit personal interests. Specifically, she wanted the Committee to investigate the sale of Shin Corporation to Temasek Holdings. The AEC later received an hour-long weekly spot to produce a reality show describing its work.
- The National Counter Corruption Commission (NCCC), which was ordered to rush its investigation into corruption allegations involving politicians. The Commission members were appointed by the CDR and consisted of several vocal critics of Thaksin Shinawatra.
- The Securities and Exchange Commission (SEC), which would continue to investigate the sale of Shin Corporation.

After less than a week, the Assets Examination Committee was dissolved and several of its members were incorporated into a new 12-member committee with greater powers to freeze the assets of members of the Thaksin government accused of corruption. The new committee had a much wider scope that the original Committee, and was able to respond to the demands of Jaruvan Maintaka. The committee was empowered to investigate any projects or acts by members of the Thaksin government and others who were suspected of irregularities, including tax evasion. The chairman of the old committee, Sawat Chotephanich, was demoted in the new committee; he later resigned, reportedly in protest. The remaining members of the new committee included several figures who had been publicly critical of the Thaksin government, including Kaewsan Atibhoti, Jaruvan Maintaka, Nam Yimyaem, and Sak Korsaengreung. Nam Yimyaem was later appointed chair of the committee.

A separate decree (No. 31) gave the NCCC the authority to freeze the assets of politicians who failed to report their financial status by a deadline or intentionally reported false information. Another decree (No. 27) increased the penalty for political party executives whose parties had been ordered dissolved, from simply banning them from forming or becoming executives of a new party, to stripping them of their electoral rights for five years.

=== Interim charter ===
The junta released a draft interim charter on 27 September 2006, to much criticism. Structurally, the draft interim charter is similar to the 1991 Constitution, the 1976 Constitution, and the 1959 Charter, in that it sets up an extremely powerful executive branch which would appoint the entire legislature. The CDR, which would be transformed into a Council for National Security (CNS), would appoint the head of the executive branch, the entire legislature, and the drafters of a permanent constitution. Criticism focused on the fact that:

- The junta would appoint the Prime Minister and would sit in Cabinet meetings
- The junta would appoint the entire legislature
- The junta would appoint a 2,000 person National Assembly, which would appoint 200 candidates for a Constitution Assembly, which would appoint 100 members of a Constitution Assembly, which would select 25 members. The junta would directly appoint another 10 people to join the 25 in to writing a permanent constitution.

=== Military restructuring ===
Sonthi Boonyaratglin announced that the Southern Border Provinces Administrative Centre (SBPAC) and the Civilian-Police-Military Task Force (CPM) 43 would be revived. Sonthi said the Army-led multi-agency Southern Border Provinces Peace Building Command would be dissolved and its troops would come under the CPM 43, which would operate in parallel with the SBPAC. The SBPAC and CPM 43 had been dissolved in mid-2001 by former Premier Thaksin Shinawatra. Prior to that, CPM 43 was under the directive of the SBPAC. Sonthi also made himself head of the Internal Security Operations Command (ISOC). Previously, the ISOC had been headed by the Prime Minister.

The junta also extended for another three months the Thaksin government's emergency decree to combat the south Thailand insurgency. The emergency decree empowers state authorities to search and arrest suspected insurgents without warrants.

Sonthi and other senior junta leaders flew to Chiang Mai on an Air Force C-130 on 3 November 2006 to visit a prominent fortune-teller and perform a religious ceremony to ward off bad luck over their staging of the Sept 19 coup.

=== State enterprise board appointments ===
Junta leaders appointed themselves to the Boards of Directors of several state enterprises.

- Chalit Phukphasuk was appointed to the boards of Airports of Thailand (AoT) and the Thai Airways International
- Saprang Kalyanamitr was appointed to the AoT and TOT boards.
- Sathiraphan Keyanont was appointed to the Chair of the Port Authority of Thailand board

=== Human rights restrictions ===
The junta censored the media and the internet, enforced martial law, and established a 14,000-strong military unit to control public protests. An interview with the late Nuamthong Phaiwan broadcast by television channel iTV came to an abrupt end after the Director of Army-owned Channel 5 called the station to warn them against the broadcast. Additional troops were dispatched to keep order at the station.

The junta's fifth announcement authorized the Ministry of Information and Technology to block websites critical of the coup and web boards discussing the coup. Anonymous proxy servers through which Thai internet users could access a blocked webpage were also blocked, as were websites from BBC 1, BBC 2, CNN, Yahoo News, the Seattle Post-Intelligencer, The Age, Amazon.com, Amazon.co.uk, and Yale University Press containing articles about King Bhumibol Adulyadej.

The junta maintained martial law after the coup, even though junta vice-chairman Chalit Phukbhasuk claimed that there were no intelligence reports of unusual activities by supporters of deposed Premier Thaksin.

The junta was accused of intimidating Thai Rak Thai politicians and pressuring them to cease political activities. They also threatened that the party would be dissolved. The junta claimed that they were simply seeking cooperation from politicians.

In late December 2006, Surayud's Cabinet approved 556 million baht for the formation of a 14,000-strong special operations force with a mandate to control anti-junta protests. The fund allocation came from a request by the CNS. The rapid deployment force began operations on 1 December 2006. Surayud refused to explain why his Cabinet approved funding of the force after it had already started, which was contrary to PM's Office directives. Government spokesman Yongyuth Mayalarp promised that the force would be dissolved on 30 September 2007, along with the CNS. The funds would be diverted from the Defense Ministry and Police Office, but if those two agencies lacked funding, they would be diverted from the government's reserve fund for emergency situations. Yongyuth revealed that no Cabinet members questioned the use of the fund. General Saprang Kallayanamit, assistant Secretary-General of the CNS, was appointed Commander of the force.

In January, CNS secretary-general General Winai Phattiyakul, explicitly ordered media executives to prevent their employees from mentioning Thaksin and the Thai Rak Thai party. "If they don't listen, you can kick them out of your station or, if you can't use your judgment, I will use mine to help you run your station", he said to 100 media executives.

=== Drafting of a new constitution ===
The junta appointed a Constitution Drafting Committee and sponsored a leading anti-Thaksin critic, Prasong Soonsiri, to lead the Committee.

=== Anti-protest units ===
On 27 December 2006, it was revealed that the Cabinet had approved over half a billion baht worth of funding for a 14,000-man secret anti-protest special operations force, of which General Saprang was Commander. The so-called CNS Special Operations Center, funded with 556 million baht diverted from the Defense Ministry, Police Office, and government emergency reserve fund, had been secretly established by the CNS on 1 December 2006 in order to crack down on anti-junta protestors.

In May 2007, it was revealed that First Army Commander Prayuth Chan-ocha had been placed in charge of a secret army unit with a 319.1 million baht budget for mobilizing mass support for the junta. Lt. Gen. Prayuth claimed that he had acted in line with army policy, and that his activities were to serve communities, and not to seek political gain.

=== Miscellaneous controversy ===
Two members of the CNS claiming to be junta secretary-general Winai Phattiyakul's close aids were arrested for trying to solicit 40 million baht for in return seat on the Cabinet. Winai denied knowing the two men.

CNS leader Sonthi approved a 12 million baht top-secret budget for a public relations campaign to discredit Thaksin Shinawatra. The request for the money was submitted on 24 Jan 2007. Chianchuang Kalayanamitr, younger brother of CNS Deputy Secretary-General Saprang Kalayanamitr, was hired as head of the publicity team. Politicians hired as part of the CNS campaign included Chat Pattana party leader Korn Dabbaransi, Democrats Korn Chatikavanij, Alongkorn Palabutr and Korbsak Sabavasu, Prapat Panya-chatraksa, a key Thai Rak Thai member who defected to the Chat Thai party, plus ex-senator Kraisak Choonhavan. Academics hired by the CNS included Wuttipong Piebjriya-wat, Sophon Supapong, Narong Phet-prasert, and Somkiat Osotspa. However, Sophon denied he had anything to do with the campaign.

The CNS produced a 75 episode television documentary to promote its causes. The documentaries, titled "Phrungnee Tong Dee Kwa" (Tomorrow Must Be Better), were reported to cost at least 20 million baht to produce and broadcast. General Anupong Phaochinda, assistant CNS secretary-general, defended the CNS from allegations of irregularities surrounding the documentaries.

Prior to the Constitutional Tribunal's 20 May 2007 ruling on the dissolution of the Thai Rak Thai and Democrat Parties, the CNS sent tens of millions of SMS messages to mobile phone users throughout Thailand discouraging them from attending protests.

== Public reactions to the CNS ==
- An opinion poll conducted by the Assumption University's Abac Poll Research Centre across the country from October 24–28 showed that more than 60% of the respondents said they thought the current government was more moral than the previous one and 43% believed the Surayud government was less biased towards capitalist business interests than its predecessor. Other responses put Surayud before Thaksin in regards to reliability, honesty, morality, image abroad and ability to quickly resolve problems. Surayud and Thaskin were on a par regarding solving people's troubles.
- On December 10, 2006 (Constitution Day), between 1,000 and 3,000 protesters turned out to a rally organised by half a dozen groups, including the September 19 Network Against the Coup and the Confederation for Democracy. The protesters demanded the departure of the Council for National Security (CNS) and the interim government led by Prime Minister Surayud Chulanont, the immediate lifting of martial law throughout the country, the repromulgation of the 1997 constitution, and general elections. Prominent protestors included Weng Tojirakarn, Sant Hathirat and former senator Prateep Ungsongtham-Hata. Smaller protests were also held in Thammasat University by the White Dove 2006 group and opposite the Supreme Court. There was a large police and military presence. Police intercepted and detained many people heading into Bangkok to attend the protests.

== Post-coup developments ==
After the 2014 Thai coup d'état, the Council for National Security was dissolved and succeeded by the National Council for Peace and Order, led by General Prayut Chan-o-cha. The NCPO oversaw the drafting of the 2017 constitution of Thailand, which cemented the military’s political influence.

In March 2019, general elections were held under the new constitution, resulting in Prayut continuing as Prime Minister of Thailand. However, despite the elections, the NCPO's rule left a legacy of military dominance in Thai politics. There have been ongoing concerns about human rights in Thailand, including media censorship and restrictions on free speech, which persisted under NCPO governance.

== See also ==
- 2005–2006 Thai political crisis
- 2006 Thai coup d'état
- Public opinion of the 2006 Thai coup d'état
- 2007 Thai general election
- 2008 Thai political crisis
- April 2009 Thai political unrest
- 2011 Thai general election
- 2013–2014 Thai political crisis
- 2014 Thai coup d'état
