= Faculty of Law, Thammasat University =

- คณะนิติศาสตร์ มหาวิทยาลัยธรรมศาสตร์
- Motto: "The Chao Phraya flows incessantly, as do the morals of Niti Dome. The Children of the Dome shall light society with the justice we uphold." ("Dome" refers to the university)
- Type: Academic faculty of a public university
- Established: 27 June 1934
- Parent institution: Thammasat University
- Dean: Pokpong Srisanit, Associate Professor
- Administrative staff: 85 (teaching staff)
- Students: 4,000
- Location: Bangkok, Thailand
- Campus: • Tha Phra Chan Campus No. 2, Phra Chan Road, Phra Borom Maha Ratchawang Subdistrict, Phra Nakhon District, Bangkok, 10200 14.07559°N 100.61722°E • Rangsit Campus No. 99, Village 18, Phahonyothin Road, Khlong Nueng Subdistrict, Khlong Luang District, Pathum Thani Province, 12120 • Lampang Campus No. 248, Village 2, Pong Yang Khok Subdistrict, Hang Chat District, Lampang Province, 52190
- Colours: White
- Mascots: Balance and Yellow Tiger
- Website: www.law.tu.ac.th

The Faculty of Law, Thammasat University (Thai: คณะนิติศาสตร์ มหาวิทยาลัยธรรมศาสตร์; RTGS: Khana Nitisat Mahawitthayalai Thammasat) is an administrative agency of the Thai government, being an academic faculty attached to Thammasat University, Ministry of Education. It is the second oldest university faculty in the country, preceded only by the Faculty of Medicine, Mahidol University. It has long played a major role in the politics of Thailand and among its graduates are many former prime ministers, ministers, senior government officers, judges, and other public figures.

== History ==
TU's faculty of law dates from the inception of the law school in 1907 by Prince Raphi Phatthanasak, Prince of Ratchaburi, the Western-educated minister of justice and a son of King Chulalongkorn. Classes were originally conducted at the luncheon lobby of the prince's palace; he gave lectures there every afternoon. The law school was soon moved to the central building of the Ministry of Justice due to the increasing number of students.

In 1910 Prince Raphi resigned from the office of Minister of Justice and the law school was first relocated to Wat Mahathat Yuwarat Rang Sarit, a royally sponsored Buddhist temple, and then to a small royal residence next to the Civil Court.

The following year, King Vajiravudh took the law school under his patronage. By a royal command, the school became a subsidiary of the Ministry of Justice. The school was once again relocated to the former office of the Department of Public Relations, near Phan Phiphop Lila Bridge.

Following the successful coup d'état against King Prajadhipok, the government, on 25 April 1932, ordered a Faculty of Law and Public Administration to be established as part of Chulalongkorn University and the law school to be transferred to the newly established faculty.

In 1933, Narisara Nuvadtivongs, the Regent for King Prajadhipok, signed the Moral and Political Science University Act, Buddhist Era 2476 (1933), which came into force on 20 March. Certain parts of the Act read:

Section 4. There shall be established a university called 'Moral and Political Science University', bearing the duty to provide education as to legal science, political science, economic science and all other branches concerning moral and political science. Section 5. The Faculty of Law and Public Administration, Chulalongkorn University, as well as its property and budgets shall all be transferred to the University by 1 April 1934.

An open admissions university from the beginning, Thammasat offered only a "Bachelor of Jurisprudence" course.

On 14 June 1939, the Bachelor of Jurisprudence course was divided into four majors, organised into separate faculties: the faculty of law, the faculty of public administration, the faculty of economics, and the faculty of commerce. The Bachelor of Jurisprudence course completely came to an end in 1953.

In 1969, the faculty of law organised an examination for lecturer selection for the first time, and started providing funds for developing its lecturers by sending them to study abroad, such as, the National Civil Service Commission Fund, the Oceanic and Suwannamat Fund, the French Government Fund, and the Ananda Mahidol Fund.

In 1971, credit system and new evaluation system (grade point average system) were used in the university for the first time. The faculty of law had improved its courses to be in compliance with the new systems, but has retained its previous evaluation system (point average system) as its system of educational assessment up to the present day.

In 2006, Thammasat University's Faculty of Law Council resolved to move all undergraduate courses, other than summer courses, from Tha Phra Chan campus in Bangkok to the Rangsit campus in Pathum Thani Province.

In 2008, the Lampang campus of the university was established. The university announced the opening of a branch of the faculty of law there. Law courses began the following year. Would-be students at this campus are required to have completed secondary education and to be domiciled in the northern Thailand of the country. The university's direct admission system and the government's central admission system were melded together. Each year about 150 applicants are selected from the former system and another 50 from the latter system.

== Administration ==
=== Deans ===
List of Thammasat University's Faculty of Law Deans
Name	Years served
1. Nitisatphaisan (Wan Chamonman), Prof Phraya	1949–1953
2. Latphlithammaprakhan (Wong Latphli), Prof Phraya	1953–1960
3. Atthakariniphon (Sitthi Chunnanon), Prof Phraya	1960–1968
4. Sanya Dharmasakti, Prof	1968–1971
5. Chitti Tingsaphat, Prof	1971–1974
6. Acting Dean	1974–1975
7. Pridi Kasemsap, Prof	1975–1976
8. Acting Dean	1976–1978
9. Mana Phitthayaphon, Prof	1978–1979
10. Phaisit Phiphatthanakun, Prof	1979–1982
11. Kiatkhachon Watthanasak, Assoc Prof	1982–1985
12. Preecha Suwannathat, Assist Prof	1985–1986
13. Phanat Thatsaniyanon, Instructor	1886–1988
14. Prathan Watthanawanit, Assoc Prof	1988–1991
15. Somyot Chueathai, Assist Prof	1991–1997
16. Suthi Supphanit, Assoc Prof	1997–1998
17. Suthi Iamprayun, Assist Prof	1998–2001
18. Suraphol Nitikraipot, Prof	2001–2004
19. Kamchai Chongchakkraphan, Assoc Prof	2004–2007
20. Somkit Lertpaithoon, Prof	2007–2010
21. Surasak Likasitwatanakul, Prof	2010–2013
22. Narong Chaihan, Assoc Prof	2013–2016
23. Udom Rathamarit, Prof	2016–2019
24. Munin Pongsapan, Assoc Prof	2019–2022
25. Pokpong Srisanit, Assoc Prof	2022–present

Note: Academic titles shown above are those at the time of assuming the dean's office, some of which may have later changed.

=== Academic centers ===
Thammasat University's Faculty of Law consists of the following academic centers:

- Civil Law Center
- Criminal Law and Criminology Center
- Public Law Center
- Social, Historical and Philosophical Law Center
- International Trade Law Center

- Commercial and Business Law Center
- International Law Center
- Natural Resources and Environment Law Center
- Tax Law Center

== Courses ==
=== Undergraduate ===
Each year, the faculty has an intake of about 600–700 undergraduate students pursuing the four-year LL.B. programme, with a total enrollment of almost 2,000–3,000 students. Holders of a non-law degree may also enroll in the evening LL.B. programme, the length of which is shorted to three years, with approximately 500–600 students for each year.

An LL.B. in business law is the first Undergraduate International Programme in Law of Thailand held at Tha Pra Chan campus. There are about 100–120 students per year. For admission of this programme, two tracks are offered: students can use the SAT examination or TUAdLaw examination (it is designed to assess your aptitude for the skills required to study law at undergraduate level in English at Thammasat University.) The programme is staffed by over 100 teachers with overseas experience from various jurisdictions such as the United Kingdom, the United States, France, Germany, Italy, Australia and Japan. Students are introduced to the philosophical foundations underlying the legal code and are encouraged to discuss, articulate legal reasoning, advance arguments, and think of "the law that ought to be" in tandem with "the law that is".

=== Graduate ===
At the graduate level, teaching is based upon a comparative approach and intended to encourage critical thinking and insights into legal problems in both theoretical and practical dimensions. Those leaving the undergraduate law courses therefrom are expected to become legal scholars, legal thinkers, experts, or practitioners in particular areas of law. Under the LL.M. programme, in an attempt to promote expertise in specific areas, eight fields of study are offered: private law, criminal law, business law, international law, international trade law, tax law, public law, and environmental law.

The programme has an annual intake of about 200–300 students. Students attend classes in the evenings and may now complete their courses of study and a thesis (or an independent study on a selected topic) in five terms (2.5 years).

The Faculty offers the one year Graduate Diploma Programme in Public Law, mostly for governmental officials, with an annual intake of up to 100 students. Some credits earned from this programme may be transferred to the LL.M. programme. The faculty also offers the Graduate Diploma Programme in Business Law which provides fields of concentration, e.g., "intellectual property" or "risk management and insurance".

At the doctoral level, admission is granted via an English test as well as a qualifying examination on a selected topic. This doctoral programme largely consists of independent research, although attendance at a Legal Methodology Class is compulsory.

== Symbols ==
- Seal – The seal of Thammasat University or Thammachak seal—a Constitution on Phan or container, with Thammachak or the Wheel of Law behind—is also used as the seal of the faculty, in accordance with the Notification of the Office of the Prime Minister Re: Determination of Official Agency Seal under the Official Seal Act BE 2482 (1939), (No. 50), dated 2 February BE 2509 (1966).
- Flag – The flag of Thammasat University or Thammachak Flag is also used as the Flag of the Faculty, but the phrases "Faculty of Law" are added under the figure of Thammachak or the Wheel of Law.
- Colour – White is the colour of the faculty, signifying cleanliness and blamelessness. Stripes on the gowns of the faculty are also in white.
- Symbol – Scale of justice
- Statue – A Buddha statue, Phra Phuttha Lokkanitithammathet (Thai: พระพุทธโลกนิติธรรมเทสก์) or the Buddha of Legal Teachings, established by the Thammasat's Faculty of Law Society and entitled by Yannasangwon (Charoen Suwatthano), the Supreme Patriarch, on the occasion of the 30th anniversary of the Society.
- Mascot – A "yellow tiger" is the mascot of the faculty, signifying elegance, honour, justice, satisfaction, power, majesty, and leadership. The Yellow Tiger is used as the mascot for counterbalancing the power of the "red lion", the mascot of the Faculty of Political Science, Thammasat University.
- Anthems – Other than the anthem of Thammasat Faculty or Yung Thong (Thai: ยูงทอง), the faculty also takes the following four songs as its important songs:
  - "Nitisat Samakkhi" (Thai: นิติศาสตร์สามัคคี, "Faculty of Law in Unity") – composed by Thawip Woradilok, a National Artist, and written by Uea Sunthonsanan.
  - "Nitisat Samanachan" (Thai: นิติศาสตร์สมานฉันท์, "Faculty of Law in Harmony") – also composed and written by Thawip Woradilok and Uea Sunthonsanan.
  - "Tra Chu" (Thai: ตราชู, "The Balance") – the name of its composer is unknown, but the song is sung on 7 August of every year before the Court of Justice in Bangkok.
  - "Bum Niti" (Thai: บูมนิติ, "Boom of the Faculty") – the composer is unknown.

== Notable alumni ==
- Sanya Thammasak, Professor (สัญญา ธรรมศักดิ์): Prime Minister of Thailand, Dean and Professor of the Faculty of Law, Thammasat University; Rector of Thammasat University; President of the Privy Council
- Thanin Kraivichien, Professor (ธานินทร์ กรัยวิเชียร): Prime Minister of Thailand, Professor of the Faculty of Law, Thammasat University; chief of the judge panel of the Supreme Court of Thailand; Privy Councillor
- Chuan Likphai (ชวน หลีกภัย): Prime Minister of Thailand, Leader of Democrat Party, Speaker of the House of Representatives of Thailand
- Samak Sunthorawet (สมัคร สุนทรเวช): Prime Minister of Thailand, Leader of the People's Power Party, minister of various ministries, Governor of Bangkok Metropolis
- Somchai Wongsawat (สมชาย วงศ์สวัสดิ์): Prime Minister of Thailand, Minister of Education, Permanent Secretary for Justice
- Worachet Pakeerut, Professor (วรเจตน์ ภาคีรัตน์): professor of the faculty of law, Thammasat University
- Wissanu Krea-ngam, Professor (วิษณุ เครืองาม): deputy prime minister, Secretary General of the Cabinet, Professor of the Faculty of Law, Chulalongkorn University
- Meechai Ruchuphan, President of the National Legislative Assembly, President of the Senate of Thailand, deputy prime minister
- Kittisak Prokati, Assistant Professor (กิตติศักดิ์ ปรกติ): Professor of the Faculty of Law, Thammasat University
- Kaewsan Atibodhi, Instructor (แก้วสรรค์ อติโพธิ): Vice Rector of Thammasat University, member of 1996 Constitution Drafting Assembly, senator, member of the Committee for Inspection of Acts being Detrimental to the State
- Banjerd Singkaneti, Associate Professor (บรรเจิด สิงคะเนติ): Professor of the Faculty of Law, Thammasat University and National Institute of Development Administration (NIDA)
- Prinya Thaewanarumitkul, Instructor (ปริญญา เทวานฤมิตรกุล): Vice Rector of Thammasat University
- Somyot Chueathai, Associate Professor (สมยศ เชื้อไทย): Dean and Professor of the Faculty of Law, Thammasat University
- Suraphol Nitikraipot, Professor (สุรพล นิติไกรพจน์): Member of the National Legislative Assembly; Dean and Professor of the Faculty of Law, Thammasat University; Rector of Thammasat University
- Veera Musikapong (วีระ มุสิกพงศ์): politician, journalist, activist for democracy
- Bajrakitiyabha (พัชรกิติยาภา): daughter of Vajiralongkorn, granddaughter of Bhumibol Adulyadej

== Activities ==
=== Day Commemorating Prince Raphi ===
Every August, the faculty organises an Exhibition of the Day Commemorating Prince Raphi. Each year, four male and four female students are elected by students to be exhibition ambassadors who perform ceremonial functions. Activities consist of laying a wreath before the prince's statue at the Supreme Court of Justice as a homage to the prince, Buddhist rites, academic forums on various topics usually concerning political and social events, a free legal clinic, academic competitions, and a moot court.
