= Somyot Chueathai =

- สมยศ เชื้อไทย
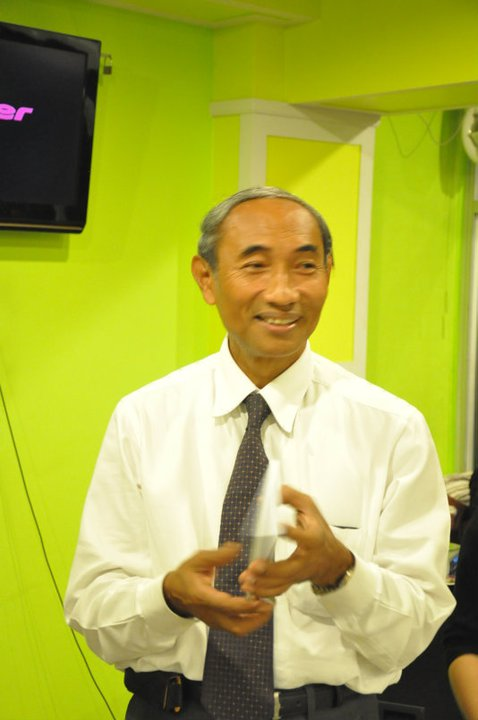
- Somyot Chueathai on January 22, 2011
- Born: January 1, 1950 (age 76); Phang Nga, Thailand
- Education: LLB (honoris causa), TU; Thai Barrister-at-Law; Public Law Certificate, UoB
- Occupation: Civil servant (university lecturer)
- Title: Assoc Prof

Somyot Chueathai (Thai: สมยศ เชื้อไทย; born 1950) is a Thai academic, constitutional law, and public law professor and 15th dean of the Faculty of Law, Thammasat University, the oldest faculty of law in the country.

== Education ==
After graduating from the Faculty of Law, Thammasat University, as a Bachelor of Laws (honoris causa), Somyot became a member of the Thai Bar Association. Following that, he studied abroad in Germany, where he has been conferred a public law certificate by the University of Bonn.

== Academic career ==
After completing education courses in Germany, Somyot became a civil servant of Thammasat University, where he served as a public law lecturer until his retirement in 2012. Chueathai had been the Thammasat University Deputy Rector for Student Affairs, the President of the Thammasat Law Association (2004–2008), the Director-General of the Legal Centre (2009), a member of the Council of State (2009–present), etc.

During his tenure as the President of the Thammasat Law Association, Somyot had for many times launched public campaigns against Thaksin Shinawatra, then Prime Minister, calling for impeachment of Thaksin on account of the series of corruption and conflict of interest scandals. In 2006, Thaksin decreed the dissolution of the House of Representatives. Somyot issued the following statement:

"According to the democratic principles, the dissolution of the House of Representatives is the power the Executive Branch may exercise in order to solve the crisis between the Council of Ministers and the National Assembly or the problems of the House of Representatives itself. [...] But, this time, the dissolution of the House has been decreed and the new election has been fixed urgently. It raises a question as to whether Mr Thaksin has exercised the executive power to wash himself before coming back to the power. [...]"

Following the military coup against Thaksin in 2006 and the promulgation of the new Constitution in 2007, Somyot stated that he once foretold that the new constitution will be unlikely to solve any problems in the country, but no one pays attention to the words of a public law instructor like him because everyone wants to have a new election taken place without delay. Somyot then declared that he ceased to teach constitutional law from that time onwards. He said:

"The upcoming problems are judicial activism. The 2007 Constitution has bound the judges with political affairs. This will result in serious worries, because the heart of the Constitution should be the separation of powers. [...] When the courts are empowered to interfere with the politics, a chaos will ensue. [...]

"Today, the Constitution is treated as a scapegoat. It is like a house which has been taken to pieces by its residents in order to build up a new one which is in good odour with them. But, a newly built house will never serve their wish and will then be taken down again and again, until the residents see the true problem of the house — a little leak somewhere on the roof or elsewhere. [...] Section 309 of the Constitution will cause the return of a new coup and a new coup and a new coup, over and over. The section is like a son that kills his own father, because it is bigger than the Constitution. Now, I'd like to tell you that I won't teach constitutional law anymore, because I cannot accept section 309."

Somyot has produced many prominent academic works, all of which could be viewed at the Office of the Libraries, Thammasat University.

As for his personal life, Somyot is a football player. He has played football since he was a student at the Faculty of Law, Thammasat University. During his tenure at Thammasat, Somyot also served as a manager of the university football team and usually plays football with his students in his spare time.

Somyot is usually called by his students as "Ong Dam" (องค์ดำ), which means "Black Deity," due to his proficiency and his dark skin. While Kaewsan Atibodhi, former lecturer at the same faculty, is called "Ong Khao" (องค์ขาว), meaning "White Deity".
