= Chotiros Suriyawong =

Thai actress

Chotiros "Amy" Suriyawong (Thai: "เอมี่" โชติรส สุริยะวงศ์) is a Thai actress and university student.

== Awards dress controversy ==
During the 2007, Subhanahongsa Awards on February 17, Chotiros wore a revealing black dress that attracted media attention, proved to be controversial, and resulted in Chotiros being disciplined by her university. The ankle-length dress had a 3-inch-wide (76 mm) front slit held together by seven thin strips of fabric that started at her left hip and curved upward to her cleavage.

A moral backlash against Chotiros and her dress arose in the days following the awards show. Somsak Techaratanaprasert , the owner of Sahamongkol Film International (Thailand's largest production house), ordered all footage of Chotiros to be deleted from his next film Suay Samurai, saying "I don't want my actresses to dress that way. and it goes against Thai culture." He banned her from appearing in any of his future films. Culture Minister Khaisri Sri-aroon called her dress "very inappropriate."

However, Amy was supported by many, some of whom resented the junta's morality drive. The university rector Suraphol Nitikraipot and assistant rector for student affairs Prinya Thewanaruemitkul at Thammasat University, at which Chotiros was a senior at the Faculty of Liberal Arts, forced Chotiros to appear before a press conference with deans of the university, and made her apologize for her actions. As punishment, she was ordered to read books to blind children for 15 days, as well as perform other community services.
