= Prinya Thaewanarumitkul =

Thai legal scholar

Associate Professor Prinya Thaewanarumitkul
- ปริญญา เทวานฤมิตรกุล
- Born: 17 January 1968 (age 58); Tha Lat, Phanom Sarakham, chachoengsao, Thailand
- Education: Georg-August-Universität Göttingen
- Occupation: Professor at the Thammasat University
- Years active: 1998–present

Prinya Thaewanarumitkul (Thai: ปริญญา เทวานฤมิตรกุล; RTGS: Parinya Thewanaruemitkun) is a Thai legal scholar specialising in public law. He is a Vice Rector for Administration and Sustainability at Thammasat University.

During the 1992 protests against the military-led government that led to Bloody May, Prinya was Secretary-General of the Student Federation of Thailand. He was a student at Thammasat University at the time. Prinya later finished a M.Jus and a Ph.D. in public law from the University of Göttingen.

Prinya currently lectures in constitutional law and is Assistant Rector for Student Affairs at Thammasat University.

== Students and oppositional leader ==
In 1992, Prinya was the secretary-general of the Students Federation of Thailand. He joined the Confederation for Democracy (CFD), an oppositional alliance against the military-sponsored government of General Suchinda Kraprayoon. He became a key figure of the network, alongside Palang Dharma Party leader Chamlong Srimuang, slum-dwellers' activist Prateep Ungsongtham, the daughter of incarcerated activist Chalard Worachat, trade unionist Somsak Kosaisuuk and the academics Sant Hathirat and Weng Tojirakarn.

== Academic career ==
Prinya continued his studies in Germany, receiving his master's degree from the University of Göttingen in 1998 and his Ph.D. from the same university in 2004. His dissertation thesis compared the systems and problematics of party financing, donations, transparency and control in Thailand and Germany.

In 1998, he started teaching public law at the Thammasat University. In 2005, he became assistant rector for students' affairs. Since 2005, he has been vice rector for students' affairs. Since 2006, he has been a member of the jurisprudence branch of the National Research Council of Thailand.

== Proposals for constitutional reform ==
Prinya has made several proposals for reform of the Constitution of Thailand. These include the eliminating of the requirement that candidates for the House of Representatives must be members of a political party for at least 90 days prior to an election. The requirement was originally designed to increase the affiliation that politicians have for political parties, thus increasing the strength of party-based politics. Prinya made the suggestion during the Thailand political crisis 2005-2006, during which there was growing public pressure to allow Thai Rak Thai politicians to more easily defect from their party.

Prinya also criticized the concept of multi-seat constituencies, noting that the system was based on population and not on the equality of people. With multi-seat constituencies, "Some provinces, such as Ranong, which has a lower population than other provinces, would get only one MP, but constituencies in larger provinces like Nakhon Ratchasima would get three MPs," he said.

== Assistant rector ==
In his position as the assistant rector for student affairs of Thammasat University, he played a role in the controversy around arts senior "Amy" Chotiros Suriyawong who wore a revealing black dress during the 2007 Suphannahong National Film Awards viewed by some as being too sexy. Prinya made Amy appear before a press conference to apologize for her actions. She was warned that the University might deny her a diploma. As a punishment, Prinya ordered her to read books to blind children for 15 days, as well as perform other community services. Afterwards, Prinya launched a campaign to urge students not to dress in a sexy manner, using freshman Social Administration student and Miss Teen Thailand 2002 "Cheer" Tikamporn Rita-apinan as his presenter.
