= Nuamthong Praiwan =

Thai activist

- นวมทอง ไพรวัลย์
- Born: 21 October 1946; Bang Kruai district, Nonthaburi, Thailand
- Died: October 31, 2006 (aged 60); Vibhavadi Rangsit Road, Chatuchak district, Bangkok, Thailand
- Cause of death: Suicide
- Body discovered: Vibhavadi Rangsit Road footbridge
- Occupation: Taxi driver
- Spouse: Boonchu
- Children: 1

Nuamthong Praiwan (Thai: นวมทอง ไพรวัลย์, RTGS: Nuamthong Phraiwan; 21 October 1946 – 31 October 2006) was a Thai taxi driver who drove his taxi into a tank in protest after the military coup of 2006. He was later found hanging from a pedestrian footbridge. Officials found a suicide note and later ruled his death a suicide. His sacrifices were praised by several democracy activists.

== Driving taxi into tank ==
At 6 am, Saturday 30 September 2006, Nuamthong drove his taxi, spray painted with the words "[CDR is] destroying the country," and "Sacrificing life", into an M41 Walker Bulldog tank at Bangkok's Royal Plaza. Nuamthong was severely injured and taken to a police station nearby. "I did it intentionally to protest the junta that has destroyed our country, and I painted all the words myself," noted Nuamthong to reporters from his bed at Vachira Hospital.

Nuamthong was charged with damaging state property. Authorities downplayed the incident, saying that Nuamthong was drunk and no messages were sprayed on the taxi. However, several newspapers reported on the legibility of the words painted on the car. Akkara Thiproj, deputy spokesperson for the military junta, expressed scepticism about Nuamthong's intentions in crashing into the tank, and claimed that "Nobodies’ ideals are so great that they would sacrifice their lives for them."

Praiwan's taxi after he drove it into the tank. Part of his painted slogans are visible.

He was released from the hospital on 12 October, and attended the 33rd anniversary of the 14 October 1973 democratic uprising.

== Death ==
Nuamgthong's body was found hanging, with a hood covering his face, from a footbridge on Vibhavadi Rangsit road near the headquarters of Thai Rath newspaper in Bangkok on 31 October 2006. Police ruled the death a suicide after forensic tests were stated to have shown no traces of a physical assault or struggle. Although Nuamthong's body was found with a suicide note, family members testified that he had given no hint of being depressed or about to commit suicide. Nuamthong wore a black T-shirt with a drawing of the Democracy Monument and a poem about the power of the masses. Newspaper clippings about his crash into the army tank were also found on his body. His wife, Boonchu, said he had given no farewells or done anything that would suggest he was planning to kill himself.

His wife noted, "I couldn't be more sad losing the love of my life and the leader of my family. I didn't think he would be this brave, but I'm very proud of him for sacrificing for the country."

== Funeral ==
Funeral rites were held at Wat Bua Kwan in Nonthaburi's Muang district. A score of senior police were at his funeral to "keep the peace" while pro-democracy groups sent representatives and flower wreaths to honour his death.

His wife later attempted to transport his coffin to the 14 October 1973 Memorial on Ratchadamnoen road for bathing rituals. Police prevented her van from arriving at the Memorial.

About 200 people attended the second night of Nuamthong's funeral at Wat Bua Kwan. Among them were military and police officers, politicians from the Thai Rak Thai Party and National Human Rights Commissioner Jaran Dithapichai. Sant Hathirat read a statement declaring Nuamthong a "democracy martyr."

He was also praised by activist and former senator Prateep Ungsongtham Hata, who noted, "Uncle Nuamthong has made the biggest sacrifice for democracy. I fought for democracy all my life but don't have the courage to do as much as he did."

Junta deputy spokesperson Akara Tipparoj apologised for his earlier claim that nobody would hurt themselves for political ideals and claimed he planned to attend the funeral, the Young People for Democracy Movement (YPD) condemned Akara's views as ignorant and noted that; "His remark is an insult, as Thailand has a long history of people dying to defend democracy from dictatorship."

Prime Minister General Surayud Chulanont said he was saddened by the news but doubted there would be copycat suicide attempts.

After his death, an interview Nuamthong had earlier given was partially aired by iTV. The broadcast came to an abrupt end after the Director of Army-owned Channel 5 called to give a warning. Additional troops were dispatched to keep order at the station.

== Last letter ==
Glorify the Nation, Religion, King, ~~Military State~~ and ~~Police State~~ (must be inexisted).
Dear my respected friends and people. A reason of my second suicide by destroying myself is avoiding mischief like the first time, in order to resist the speech of Mr. Vice Spokesman of the CDR (Council for Democratic Reform) [...], "No one devotes their death for their ideologies". ...

— Goodbye and meet me in next life.
Nuamthong Praiwan
October 29, 2006

== Commemoration events ==
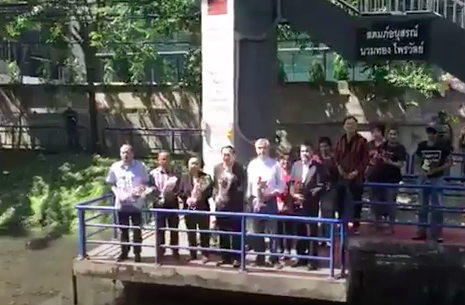
Commemoration of Nuamthong Praiwan suicide in 2019

Annually on 31 October, at a footbridge on Vibhavadi Rangsit road near the headquarters of Thai Rath newspaper in Bangkok, pro-democracy activists and supporters commemorated the symbolic suicide of Nuamthong Praiwan.

In 2013, about a thousand of anti-coup activists and Red Shirts commemorated the seventh anniversary of the suicide. The United Front for Democracy Against Dictatorship group donated two million baht to Nuamthong's wife. The donation was from Potjaman Na Pombejra, ex-wife of former Prime Minister Thaksin Shinawatra.

== Films ==
Democracy After Death

Democracy After Death: The Tragedy of Uncle Nuamthong Praiwan directed in exile by Neti Wichiansaen (Pruay Santihead) in 2016. It was a combination of animation, performances and news footage. The director tried to examine the period of Thai politics defined by the military coup of 2006 and 2014. Neti was accused of violating Article 112 in late 2010.

== See also ==
- 2006 Thailand coup
- Suicide of Khanakorn Pianchana
- Human rights in Thailand
- Altruistic suicide
