= Nam Yimyaem =

Thai judge

Nam Yimyaem (Thai: นาม ยิ้มแย้ม) is a retired judge of the Supreme Court of Thailand and former Deputy President of the Court. He currently serves as the chairperson of the committee investigating the assets of deposed Prime Minister Thaksin Shinawatra.

== April 2006 election ==
In the April 2006 legislative election, Nam chaired an Election Commission subcommittee investigating allegations that Thai Rak Thai party executive Thammarak Israngukra na Ayuthaya had hired smaller parties to contest the election.

== Election commission ==
Nam was nominated as a candidate for Election Commissioner after the previous commissioners were jailed. During the vetting process, he declared a net worth of 66 million Baht in combined assets with his spouse. However, the Senate ultimately did not select him.

== Post-2006 coup asset examination committee ==
Nam was appointed by the military junta that overthrew Thaksin Shinawatra’s government to chair a committee investigating the former administration. He replaced Sawat Chotepanich, who resigned after the dissolution of the original committee due to disagreements about its scope. The revised committee was granted broad authority, including investigations into tax evasion, and could examine not only former government officials but also civil servants. Its members included Jaruvan Maintaka, Kaewsan Atibhoti, and Sak Korsaengruang.
