= Jaruvan Maintaka =

Thai Auditor-General (born 1945)

Khun Ying Jaruvan Maintaka
- Born: July 5, 1945 (age 80); Bangkok, Thailand
- Occupation: Former Auditor-General
- Spouse: Songkiat Maintaka
- Children: Kittiwat Maintaka; Khacharin Maintaka; Supang Maintaka
- Parent(s): Tem Yanyong; Chamnian Yanyong

Khun Ying Jaruvan Maintaka (Thai: จารุวรรณ เมณฑกา; RTGS: Charuwan Menthaka, born 5 July 1945) is a former Auditor-General of Thailand.

She was appointed Auditor-General in December 2001 and refused to leave the office after the Constitutional Court ruled that her nomination was unlawful. She once again refused to give her office up when she reached her pension age and the Council of State ruled that she could no longer stay in the office. Her refusal to leave the office triggered fierce conflicts within the State Audit Office as some of its officials demanded her to respect the law and filed lawsuits against her. The Administrative Court eventually decided in October 2010 that she must vacate office.

Jaruvan is known for her public criticism of deposed premier Thaksin Shinawatra. She has also been criticized for nepotism and lack of transparency, hiring her own son as a personal secretary using the state budget, bringing her children on a state-funded official trip, etc. In November 2015, the Criminal Court sentenced her to imprisonment for corruption in office.

== Early life and education ==
Jaruvan was the oldest girl in a family of eight children. She converted to Protestantism as a teenager. After attaining a bachelor's degree from the commerce and accountancy faculty at Chulalongkorn University she worked as an auditor. She is married and has three children. She graduated with an MBA from Michigan State University on Thai government scholarship. Upon returning to Thailand, she joined the Thai Office of the Auditor-General.

== Career as Government Auditor ==
In her auditing and accounting career, Jaruvan served as secretary-general and then vice chairman of the Institute of Internal Auditors of Thailand. She was also an auditing board member of the Civil Service Commission. She was also a member of the State Audit Commission (SAC, Thai: คณะกรรมการตรวจเงินแผ่นดิน) and Deputy Auditor General in the Office of the Auditor General.

== Appointment as Auditor-General ==
Jaruvan was one of three nominees for the position of auditor-general in 2001, along with Prathan Dabpet and Nontaphon Nimsomboon. Prathan received 5 votes from the 8-person State Audit Commission (SAC) while Jaruvan received 3 votes. According to the constitution, State Audit Commission chairman Panya Tantiyavarong should have submitted Prathan's nomination to the Senate, as he received the majority of votes.

However, on July 3, 2001, the SAC Chairman submitted a list of all three candidates for the post of auditor-general to the Senate, which later voted to select Khunying Jaruvan Maintaka. For his decision, SAC Chairman Panya Tantiyavarong was later found by the Criminal Court to be guilty of malfeasance and was sentenced to serve three years in jail.

Jaruwan was appointed auditor-general on December 31, 2001 for a term of 5 years. She was responsible for carrying out all audit for government agencies. The questionable nature of her appointment would make her term a controversial one.

== Constitution Court ruling and subsequent controversy ==
On 24 June 2003, a petition was filed with the Constitutional Court seeking its ruling on the constitutionality of Jaruvan’s appointment by the Senate. The Constitutional Court ruled on 6 July 2004 that the selection process that led to the appointment of Khunying Jaruvan as auditor-general was unconstitutional. The court noted that the Constitution empowers the SAC to nominate only one person with the highest number of votes from a simple majority, not three as had been the case. The court stopped short of saying if she had to leave her post. However, when the Constitutional Court ruled on July 4, 2002 that the then Election Commission chairman Sirin Thoopklam's election to the body was unconstitutional, the President of the Court noted "When the court rules that the selection [process] was unconstitutional and has to be redone, the court requires the incumbent to leave the post".

However, Jaruwan refused to resign without a royal dismissal from King Bhumibol Adulyadej. She noted ""I came to take the position as commanded by a royal decision, so I will leave the post only when directed by such a decision."

The commission had suspended her salary and position allowance one day after the Constitution Court ruling. The commission then told Khunying Jaruvan to hand over her duties and any state property to the Office of the Auditor-General.

=== Replacements appointed ===
The SAC appointed Puangrat Vongpo, her deputy, as acting auditor-general on July 8. When Puangrat retired on Sept 30, 2004, the commission appointed Jerarat Noppawong na Ayutthaya as acting auditor-general, effective from Oct 1.

The State Audit Commission later nominated Wisut Montriwat, former deputy permanent secretary of the Ministry of Finance, for the post of Auditor-General. The Senate approved the nomination on 10 May 2005. However, King Bhumibol Adulyadej, in an unprecedented move, withheld his royal assent. The National Assembly did not hold a vote to overthrow the royal veto. In October 2005 the Senate rejected a motion to reaffirm her appointment, and instead deferred the decision to the SAC.

The appointment of a replacement for Jaruvan was strongly criticized by the powerful Wang Nam Yen faction of the Thai Rak Thai party, especially by MP Pramuan Ruchanaseree and faction leader Sanoh Thienthong. In late 2005, the issue came close to breaking the Wang Nam Yen-faction from the TRT.

The controversy led many to reinterpret the political role of the King in Thailand's constitutional monarchy.

=== Protesting against the Thaksin government ===
While her status as Auditor-General was still in contention, Jaruvan joined the Democrat Party and the People's Alliance for Democracy in petitioning the King to replace Thaksin Shinawatra as Prime Minister. However, demands for royal intervention met with much criticism. The King himself, in a speech on 26 April, responded "Asking for a Royally appointed prime minister is undemocratic. It is, pardon me, a mess. It is irrational"

=== Reinstatement ===
On 15 February 2006 The State Audit Commission (SAC) decided to reinstate Jaruvan as Auditor-General. Its unanimous decision came after it received a memo from the Office of King Bhumibol Adulyadej's Principal Private Secretary, advising that the situation be resolved. The SAC concluded by unanimous vote that the royal command that appointed Jaruvan was still in effect, despite the Constitution Court's ruling that her appointment was illegal and unconstitutional.

== After the 2006 coup ==
A military coup overthrew the Thaksin government on 19 September 2006. The junta abrogated the 1997 constitution and dissolved most state organizations created as a result of that constitution, but spared the Office of the Auditor-General.

=== Controversy surrounding the first AEC ===
The junta soon made Jaruvan a member of an Assets Examination Committee, tasked with investigating corruption allegations involving projects approved by the deposed government. Jaruvan threatened to resign from the Committee if its scope was not expanded to include all cases of alleged irregularity, including the personal wealth of former Cabinet ministers as well as "policy corruption", where policies were approved to allegedly benefit personal interests. Specifically, she wanted the Committee to investigate the sale of Shin Corporation to Temasek Holdings. Her lobbying was successful: the original AEC was dissolved in less than a week, she was appointed leader of a new 12-member committee with greater powers, including the power to freeze the assets of members of the Thaksin government accused of corruption. The new AEC was also empowered to investigate allegations of tax evasion. The leader of the original AEC, Sawat Chotephanich, was demoted in the new committee; he later resigned, reportedly in protest. The remaining members of the new committee included several figures who had been publicly critical of the Thaksin government, including Kaewsan Atibhoti, Nam Yimyaem, and Sak Korsaengreung.

=== Results of investigations ===
==== FIDF land purchase ====
The AEC received an hour-long weekly spot to produce a reality show publicizing its work.

In January 2007, the AEC requested that the Financial Institutions Development Fund (FIDF) file a charge against Thaksin and his wife over their 772 million baht purchase of four plots of land from the FIDF in 2003. The charge was based on an alleged violation of Article 100 of the National Counter Corruption Act, which specified that government officials and their spouses were prohibited from entering into or having interests in contracts made with state agencies under their authorisation. Article 4 of the Act stated that wrongdoers must be direct supervisors of the damaged party - in this case, the FIDF. However, the FIDF is a financial institution under the direct supervision of the Bank of Thailand, which at the time of the transaction Pridiyathorn Devakula was Governor.

Pridiyathorn Devakula defended the FIDF transaction, saying that it was transparent. Chanchai Boonritchaisri, a senior director of the central bank's Legal and Litigation Department, also claimed that the FIDF did not view itself as the damaged party, as the land was sold to the Shinawatras at a price higher than its then appraised value (about 700 million baht). The FIDF originally purchased the land from the bankrupt Erawan Trust in 1995 for 2.14 billion; Erawan Trust had seized the land from a defunct borrower for only 103 million baht.

Jaruvan countered by complaining to the public about how some state agencies failed to co-operate with the AEC. She also accused claimed that Pridiyathorn violated the law by sitting on the Board of Directors of more than three state enterprises. Pridiyathorn later resigned from the junta-appointed government. The FIDF eventually filed charges against Thaksin and his wife, noting that "damage that occurred was not necessarily due to the price received during the auction, but rather technical problems." Jaruvan then sought legal amendments that allowed charges to be filed against public officials by parties who had not been damaged.

==== Other cases ====
The AEC also appointed panels to investigate alleged irregularities in the Thaksin government's 1.4 billion baht rubber seedling project as well as the procurement of CTX 9000 bomb scanners and power supplies for Suvarnabhumi Airport.

== Criticisms ==
The Rural Doctors Society has been critical of Jaruvan for the lack of transparency of state audits. As a result, Jaruvan demanded that the Ministry of Public Health investigate the Society.

An NGO formally criticized her for hiring her son, Kittirat, as her personal secretary while paying him with a state budget of over 30,000 Baht a month.

Jaruvan was also accused of taking her two children, Kittirat and Supang, on a government-funded week-long trip to Russia.

== Royal decorations ==
Jaruvan was appointed to Most Illustrious Order of Chula Chom Klao as a Companion (Third Class), which gives her the title of "Khunying".

== See also ==
- Works related to The Constitutional Court Order No. 57/2555 dated 10 October 2012 at Wikisource

== Other sources ==
- Poll booths 'the decider', Bangkok Post Friday May 5, 2006
- Jaruvan issue puts futures on hold, Bangkok Post Monday 22 August 2005
- Sudarat one of this year's new khunying, Bangkok Post 6 May 2005
