= Somkit Lertpaithoon =

- สมคิด เลิศไพฑูรย์

Rector of Thammasat University
- In office 26 October 2010 – 30 October 2017
- Preceded by: Surapon Nitikraipot
- Succeeded by: Gasinee Witoonchart

Somkit Lertpaithoon (Thai: สมคิด เลิศไพฑูรย์, RTGS: Somkhit Loetphaithun) is a Thai academic administrator who served as rector of Thammasat University from 2010 to 2017.

== Military ties ==
Following the 2006 Thai coup d'état, Somkit served on the as a member of the 2007 constitution drafting committee. In 2011, a group of 100 Thammasat alumni called for Somkit's resignation, criticizing his and his predecessor Surapon Nitikraipot's failure to "uphold the university’s spirit of democracy".

Following the 2014 Thai coup d'état, Somkit was appointed to the NCPO-picked National Legislative Assembly (NLA). In August 2014, a group of students identifying as the League of Liberal Thammasat for Democracy (LLTD) presented a letter to Somkit asking him to clarify his ties to the military.

In February 2015, Somkit signed an order to end the employment of Somsak Jeamteerasakul, a leading critic of the military junta.
