= Vanquisher =

Vanquisher may refer to:

- HMS Vanquisher, a V-class destroyer of the Royal Navy 1917–1945
- Vanquisher (film), a 2009 Thai film
- Vanquisher, a 2016 film featuring Dominika Wolski
- "Vanquisher", a song by Songs: Ohia from Songs: Ohia, 1997
