= Kittisak Prokati =

Thai legal scholar

Kittisak Prokati (Thai: กิตติศักดิ์ ปรกติ; RTGS: Kittisak Prokkati; born 7 December 1956) is a Thai legal scholar. He is assistant professor of comparative law, civil law and philosophy of law at the Faculty of Law, Thammasat University.

== Education and academic career ==
Kittisak graduated from the Faculty of Law, Thammasat University, and received a diploma in comparative law from the University of Strasbourg in France, as well as a master's degree (Magister Juris) and a research doctorate in law (Dr. iur.) from the University of Bonn, Germany.

He teaches comparative law, civil law and philosophy of law at the Faculty of Law, Thammasat University. He was a deputy dean of law at Thammasat University and is the President of the Thammasat University Faculty Senate and a Thammasat University Councillor. He is also a chair professor in international legal studies at the Graduate School of Law, Kyushu University.

Kittisak has initiated the establishment of a Centre for German Legal Studies and an expert lectureship of the German Academic Exchange Service at the Faculty of Law, Thammasat University. In 2009 he was awarded the Order of Merit of the Federal Republic of Germany (Bundesverdienstkreuz) for his efforts to further exchange and co-operation between the legal systems of Thailand and Germany. Alongside his Thammasat Law Faculty colleague Worachet Pakeerut, he serves in the supervisory board of the German-Southeast Asian Center of Excellence for Public Policy and Good Governance (CPG).

He has published works about LGBT, the reformation of Thai law under European influence (2003), personality rights (2003), and background and fundamental legal methodology of civil law and common law (2004), as well as a textbook on general principles of natural persons and legal persons (2007).

== Political views and activism ==
Kittisak supports section 112 of the Thai Criminal Code (known as lèse majesté law) and the categorisation of the section as an offence against national security. However, he agreed that the current fifteen year imprisonment is immoderate and the current enforcement of section 112 is problematical.

During the 2013–14 Thai political crisis, Kittisak became known as a supporter of the oppositional "People's Democratic Reform Committee" (PDRC). Kittisak delivered several speeches against the Pheu Thai Party on the PDRC stage. He also supports many ideas and operations of the PDRC, including the creation of an unelected people's council to oversee political reform and the seizure of public offices, which he described as a peaceful revolution.

His assets and bank accounts have been frozen by the Department of Special Investigation since 20 December 2013 on grounds of financing the PDRC. On 14 May 2014, the Criminal Court issued an arrest warrant for him on the charge of insurrection. He also faces seven other serious charges. He surrendered himself to the court on 19 May 2014 and successfully requested a provisional release, using his assistant professor position as security for bail. A public prosecutor is scheduled to institute a case against him on 27 June 2014.

== Accusations of plagiarism ==
On 8 May 2014, Wuttipong Pongsuwan, Minister of Defence Advisor, accused Kittisak of plagiarising the article Uniform Sales Law – The Experience with Uniform Sales Laws in the Federal Republic of Germany by Peter Schlechtriem and presenting it as his own article under the title of The United Nations Convention on Contracts for the International Sale of Goods of 1980. The matter went viral on the internet. On 9 May 2014, Kittisak admitted that he did produce the latter work and he failed to mention Schlechtriem as the original producer. However, he said the work he produced was merely the lecture notes, not generally published.

On 10 May 2014, Associate Professor Prasit Piwawattanapanit from the Faculty of Law, Thammasat University, who is also a member of the salary promotion board of the faculty, stated that Kittisak submitted the work to the board for consideration in salary promotion and also introduced it to an international conference. When the board suspected the originality of the work, Kittisak explained that the name of Schlechtriem was omitted because of his haste in writing the article, technical errors and the mistake of his teaching assistant. Prasit, however, found the explanation unreasonable, as it appeared that many parts of the original article were modified in the manner that a person in haste or a mere teaching assistant would be unable to do. In addition, Kittisak explained that he used this work because he wanted to publish the work of Schlechtriem who was his teacher when he studied in Germany. But Prasit questioned this explanation, as Kittisak replaced the name of Schlechtriem with his own name. However, the faculty did not take any action in this respect.

== English-language works ==
- "Thailand: The "October Movement" and the Transformation to Democracy" (PDF), 1968: Memories and Legacies of a Global Revolt, Bulletin of the GHI, Washington, D.C.: German Historical Institute, pp. 99–102, 2009, archived from the original (PDF) on 2013-10-04
- Constitutionalism and Good Governance: Eastern and Western perspectives. Baden-Baden: Nomos. 2014. (co-edited with Dirk Ehlers and Henning Glaser)

Consumer Protection in Thailand, paper presented in the Conference in Honour of Prof. Wolfgang Freiherr von Marschall, 11. Dec. 1998, Faculty of Law, Rheinisch Friedrich-Wilhelm University, Bonn (15pp.)

“Transfer of Risk in the Sales of Goods – a comparative study with respect to the Thai legal system” paper presented in the annual Kyushu/Thammasat University Conference, 4–5 March 1999, Kyushu University, Bangkok (15 p.)

The Reception of Western Law in Thailand, paper presented in the Conference of the Society of Comparative Law, 24–26 September 1999, Freiburg i.Br., Germany (25 p. in German)

“Thailand’s Corporate Governance“, paper presented in the annual Kyushu/Thammasat University Conference, “Economic Law Reform in the Aftermath of the Asian Crisis: Experiences of Japan and Thailand”, 20–21 March 2000, Thammasat University, Bangkok (8 p.)

“The Role of Buddhism in the Traditional Thai Legal Culture“, paper presented in Conference on Asian Law, 13.July 2002, Nagoya University, Nagoya, Japan (21 pages).

“Vom Norden gelernt: Thailands Informationsfreiheitsgesetz”, Informationsfreiheit:Symposium des Präsidenten des Schleswig-Holsteinischen Landtages und des Unabhängigen Landeszentrums für Datenschutz, 15.Dezember 2003, 11 pages (in German)

“The Thai Legal Tradition” in Legal Traditions of Southeast Asia, SEAMEO Centre for History and Tradition, Yangon, Myanmar, 2007, p. 188-227.

“The ‘October Movement’ and the Transformation to Democracy", in: Philipp Gassert and Martin Klimke (ed.), 1968: Memories and Legacies of a Global Revolt, Bulletin of the German Historical Institute, 6/2009, Washington D.C. 2009, pp. 99–102

“King Rama V. and Constitutionalism in Thailand”, in: Pornsan Watanangura (Ed.), The Visit of King Chulalongkorn to Europe in 1907: Reflecting on Siamese History, Center for European Studies, Chulalongkorn University Press, Bangkok 2009, pp. 114–132.

“Rezeption des deutschen Sachenrechts in Thailand bezüglich der Eigentumsübereignung und des gutgläubigen Erwerbs an beweglichen Sachen“, in Yu-Cheol Shin, Rezeption europäischer Rechte in Ostasien, Bobmunsa Verlag, Seoul 2013, pp. 241–268

“Der Einfluß des deutschen Rechts auf das gemischte thailändische Rechtsystem:Rückblick und Ausblick, ”, in: Volker Grabowski (Hrsg.), Deutschland und Thailand: 150 Jahre Diplomatie und Völkerfreundschaft, Thai–Deutsches Symposium anlässlich des 150. Jahrestages der diplomatischen Beziehungen zwischen Deutschland und Thailand, Asien–Afrika–Institut, Universität Hamburg, 12.und 13. Mai 2012, Würzburg, Zenos Verlag 2014, pp. 232–257
