= Suraphol Nitikraipot =

Surapon Nitikraipot
- สุรพล นิติไกรพจน์

Rector of Thammasat University
- In office 26 October 2004 – 25 October 2010
- Preceded by: Naris Chaiyasoot
- Succeeded by: Somkit Lertpaithoon

Surapon Nitikraipot (Thai: สุรพล นิติไกรพจน์, RTGS: Suraphon Nitikraiphot) is a Thai professor of law, rector of Thammasat University, and an appointed member of the Thai military junta's National Legislative Assembly.

== Education ==
Surapon graduated with second class honors in law from Thammasat University in 1982, a Diplome d'Etudes Approfondies in public law from Université Robert Schuman in 1987, and a Doctorat (Mention très honorable) from Université Robert Schuman in 1990.

== Academic career ==
Surapon rose rapidly in the Thammasat University bureaucracy. In 1983, after just graduating with his bachelor's degree, he became Associate Dean of the Faculty of Law. In 1991, after graduating with his doctorate, he became assistant to the Deputy Rector of Treasury and Assets. In 1995, he was in charge of construction of the Asian Games sports center at Thammasat's Rangsit campus. In 1999, he was in charge of contracting the construction of the Sociology Faculty buildings. From 1998 to 2003, he was head of the University's Asset Management Office. He was Dean of the Faculty of Law from 2001 to 2004.

== Appointment to the National Legislative Assembly ==
A military coup overthrew the elected government of Prime Minister Thaksin Shinawatra. The junta abrogated the constitution and abolished Parliament. It established a National Legislative Assembly, consisting of junta-appointees. Suraphol was personally appointed to the Assembly.

== "Amy" Chotiros Suriyawong ==
Thammasat University arts senior "Amy" Chotiros Suriyawong wore a black dress during the 2007 Subhanahongsa Awards viewed by many as being highly sexy. Her dress proved extremely controversial. The owner of Sahamongkol Film ordered all footage of Chotiros to be deleted from one of his movies. The Ministry of Culture called her dress "very inappropriate." However, Amy was also supported by many, some of which resented the military junta's morality drive.

Surapon forced Amy to appear before a press conference along with her dress and the deans of the university, and made her apologize for her actions. She was warned that the University might deny her a diploma. He also punished her by forcing her to read books to blind children for 15 days, as well as perform other community services. Suraphol noted that "Society feels this is a disgrace and her actions have affected the reputation of this university."

== See also ==
- Sonthi Boonyaratkalin
- Surayud Chulanont
- 2007 Constitution of Thailand
