= Sathiraphan Keyanon =

Thai naval officer

- Born: 23 December 1947 (age 78); Bangkok, Thailand
- Military career
- Allegiance: Thailand
- Branch: Royal Thai Navy
- Rank: Admiral
- Commands: Commander-in-Chief

Sathiraphan Keyanon (Thai:สถิรพันธุ์ เกยานนท์) is a Thai naval officer, Commander of the Royal Thai Navy, and a deputy in the military junta that overthrew the government of Prime Minister Thaksin Shinawatra in a 2006 military coup. Sathiraphan graduated from the Royal Thai Naval Academy before receiving a commission as a Captain of the Patrol Squadron, Royal Thai Fleet and held many key positions in the Navy. Prior to becoming Commander of the Navy, he was the Navy's Chief of Staff. Sathiraphan was reportedly reluctant to support the coup and did not deploy any sailors in the overthrow.

== Early life and education ==
Sathiraphan born on 23 December 1947. He is the son of Admiral Satharb and Mom Rajawongse Krawik Keyanon. He study grade 1 - 3 at Amnuay Silpa School and secondary school at Debsirin School and then Armed Forces Academies Preparatory School, Class 6, Royal Thai Naval Academy, Class 63. Overseas course in Special Investigating Officer at USA, Attack Speed Boat Course at Denmark and Training weapons system to release the way to the ground Harpoon at Naval War College.

== Personal life ==
He married with Pornphen Keyanon has 1 son and 1 daughter.

== Decorations ==
- Knight Grand Cross (First Class) of the Most Exalted Order of White Elephant
- Knight Grand Cordon (Special) of the Most Exalted Order of White Elephant
- Grand Companion (Third Class, Higher Grade) of the Most Illustrious Order of Chulachomklao

== Bibliography ==
- The Nation, Figures Behind the Coup
