= Prateep Ungsongtham Hata =

Thai activist (born 1952)

- ประทีป อึ้งทรงธรรม ฮาตะ
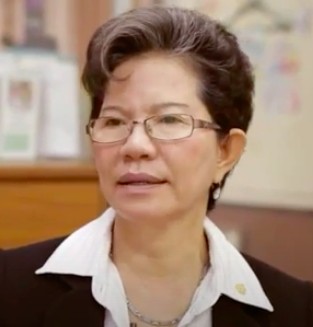
- Prateep giving an interview in 2012
- Born: 9 August 1952 (age 74); Bangkok, Thailand
- Occupation: Activist

Prateep Ungsongtham Hata (Thai: ประทีป อึ้งทรงธรรม ฮาตะ; RTGS: Prathip Uengsongtham; born 9 August 1952) is a Thai activist noted for her work with slum dwellers in the Khlong Toei District of Bangkok, Thailand. Among her supporters, she is known as Khru Prateep ("Teacher Prateep"), the "Angel of Khlong Toei" or "Slum Angel". She was awarded the Ramon Magsaysay Award for Public Service in 1978, founded and became the Secretary General of the Duang Prateep Foundation. She was one of the leaders of the 1992 oppositional movement. In 2000, she was elected to the Senate, representing Bangkok.

== Life ==
Prateep Ungsongtham was born in a slum in Bangkok's Klong Toei district. Her father was a fisherman emigrated from China, her mother was Thai. As her parents lived in an illegally erected home, she had no birth certificate and was denied admission to a public school. For four years, she could visit a relatively cheap private school. She had to drop out when she was 12 years old and her parents ran out of money. She started working on the docks of the Bangkok port, packing firecrackers and scraping rust off ships' hulls. She saved money from her meagre wages (about one baht per day) and at 15 she was able to pay for secondary education at an evening school.

Because most slum children, like her, could not go to a regular school, Prateep opened her own One Baht a Day School at her home. She spent much time helping children and their families to cope with the conditions of slum life. When the slum dwellers were threatened with eviction by the Port Authority of Thailand (PAT) which wanted to expand its facilities in 1972, a Bangkok Post reporter interviewed Prateep and her cause was publicly known. Her school received donations from private individuals, foreign embassies and the Bangkok Bank. Thammasat University students came to support her as voluntary teachers. Eventually, the PAT had to agree to a compromise solution and made a new site available 1 km away. In 1974, the school opened a real school building, and in 1976 it was officially recognised by the Bangkok Metropolitan Administration, which also revised its policy towards children without birth certificate. In the same year, Prateep received her diploma of education from Suan Dusit Teachers College.

In 1978 Prateep received the Ramon Magsaysay Award for Public Service. She used the prize money to establish the Duang Prateep Foundation (DPF; "flame of hope") and became its secretary general. Now, she began to also receive recognition from the establishment. Queen Sirikit congratulated her upon receiving the Magsaysay Award. In 1980, the Ministry of Education (which once had opposed her efforts) named her the most outstanding teacher of Thailand. In 1981, she became the first Asian citizen to receive the John D. Rockefeller III Youth Award for "outstanding contribution to Mankind". With the prize money she established the Foundation for Slum Child Care. In the same year, Prime Minister Prem Tinsulanonda visited the slums and her school.

In 1992 she became a committee member of the Confederation for Democracy and one of the leaders of the opposition to the then ruling military-sponsored government of General Suchinda Kraprayoon, that led to the bloody clashes of "Black May" and the eventual resignation of Suchinda.

In Thailand's first direct election of the Senate in the year 2000, she won a seat in this chamber of parliament. She used her position to advocate the rights of the poor and discriminated people on political level.

In 2004, she received The World's Children's Prize for the Rights of the Child from Queen Silvia of Sweden.

After the coup d'état in Thailand 2006, she became a supporter of the United Front for Democracy Against Dictatorship ("Red Shirts"). During the protests of 2010, she belonged to the more moderate wing of the movement and was concerned to see the militant tendencies within the group. Her commitment to the "Red Shirts" and the political polarisation in Thailand led to a decline of donations for her Duang Prateep Foundation from within the country. Some regular donors who are affiliated with the opposite political camp refused to give to an organisation headed by a "Red Shirt" and stopped their payments.

== Personal life ==
In 1987 she married the Japanese citizen Tatsuya Hata, a Kinki University professor for international studies and charity activist.
