= Kaewsan Atibodhi =

Thai politician (born 1951)

- Born: Kaewsan Atibodhi; August 24, 1951 (age 74); Lamphun, Thailand
- Occupations: Academic Consultant at Rangsit University and Bangkok University

Kaewsan Atibhoti (Thai: แก้วสรร อติโพธิ, RTGS: Kaeosan Atiphot; born August 24, 1951) is a Thai politician, former Senator of Thailand from Bangkok, member of Inspection of Acts being Detrimental to the State Commission (State Detrimential Acts Inspection Commission) and unsuccessful nominee for Election Commissioner.

Kaewsan Atibodhi has a twin brother, Kwansuang Atibodhi. His father, Siri Atibodhi, was the Minister of Justice and the Secretary of National Counter Corruption Commission (NCCC)(former revision of the National Anti-Corruption Commission (NACC)).

Prior to his political career, he was a law lecturer at Thammasat University. Kaewsan was a vocal critic of the former Thai Prime Minister Thaksin Shinawatra and spoke at several anti-Thaksin rallies organized by the People's Alliance for Democracy. After the a military junta overthrew Thaksin's government, the junta appointed Kaewsan to a committee to investigate the deposed government.

== Occupation ==
- Former lecturer at the Faculty of Law, Thammasat University
- Former vice Chancellor of Thammasat University
- Former member of Thai Constitution Drafting Committee 1997
- Former senator of Thailand (Elected from Bangkok)
- Former member of Inspection of Acts being Detrimental to the State Commission (State Detrimential Acts Inspection Commission)

== Criticisms of Thaksin Shinawatra ==
As Senator, Kaewsan repeatedly attacked Prime Minister Thaksin Shinawatra, comparing him to a hijacker and a rapist. He also attacked what he called the "Thaksin system".

- Kaewsan claimed that Thaksin mismanaged the Thai economy, especially by signing several free trade agreements with trading partners. "For instance, the FTA with China has put many Thai growers of garlic and other vegetables out of business due to the dumping of cheaper Chinese imports. Ballpoint-pen and electrical-transformer makers here are in bad shape as cheaper Chinese imports have flooded the domestic market."
- Kaewsan alleged that a "Thaksin-system" abused the ability of the National Assembly to control the government. Thaksin's Thai Rak Thai (TRT) party was the first party in Thai history to win a majority in the House of Representatives and form a government without coalition parties. Kaewsan claimed the Thaksin-system was composed of the TRT party, the mass media, the Federation of Thai Industries, and the Board of Trade.
